= 2004 Wirral Metropolitan Borough Council election =

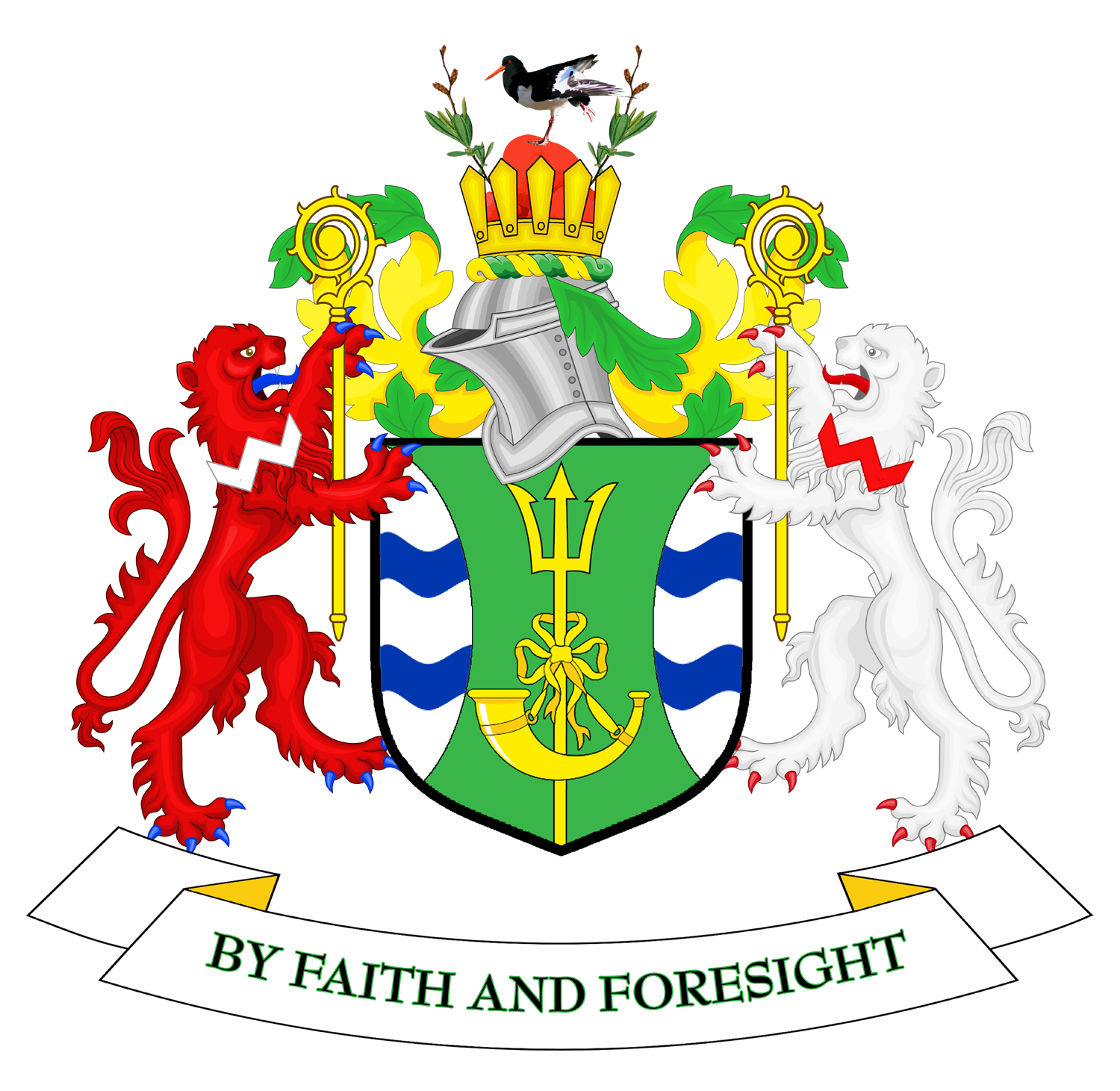
- 10 June 2004

All 66 seats to Wirral Metropolitan Borough Council 34 seats needed for a majority
- Turnout: 43.2% (▲15.3%)
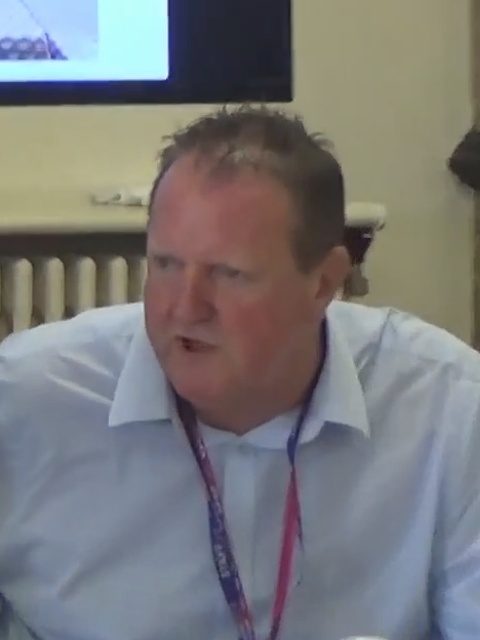

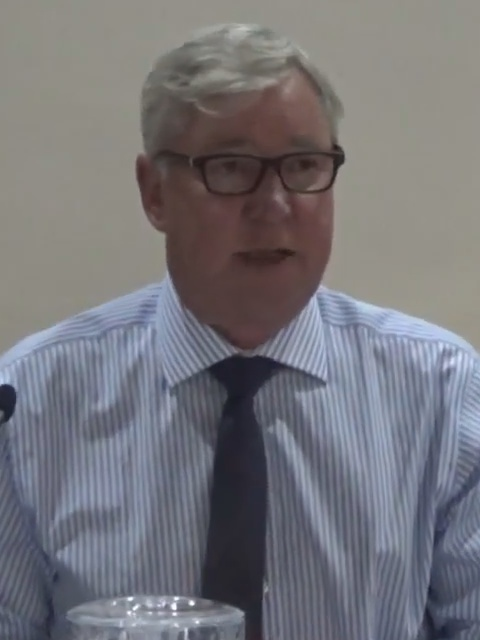

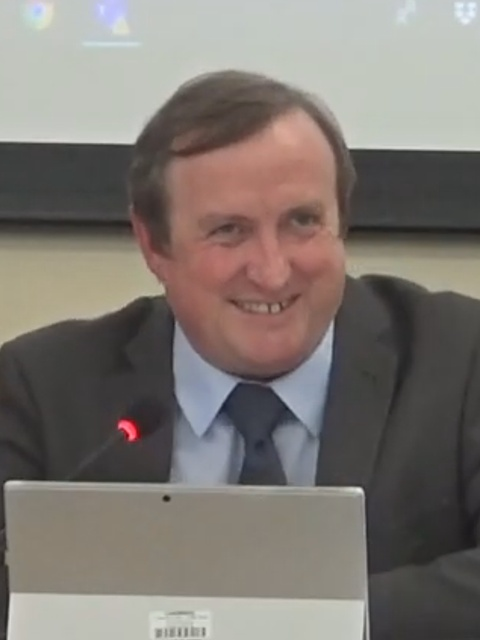
	First party	Second party	Third party
Leader	Steve Foulkes	Jeff Green	Stuart Kelly
Party	Labour	Conservative	Liberal Democrats
Leader's seat	Claughton	West Kirby and Thurstaston	Oxton
Last election	8 seats, 31.4%	8 seats, 37.9%	6 seats, 27.0%
Seats before	26	23	16
Seats won	26	21	19
Seat change	Steady	▼2	▲3
Popular vote	32,135	36,404	32,530
Percentage	29.6%	33.5%	30.0%
Swing	▼1.8%	▼4.4%	▲3.0%
- Map of results of 2004 election
Leader of the Council before election
Steve Foulkes (Labour)
No Overall Control
Leader of the Council after election
Steve Foulkes (Labour)
No Overall Control

The 2004 Wirral Metropolitan Borough Council election took place on 10 June 2004 to elect members of Wirral Metropolitan Borough Council in England. This election was held on the same day as other local elections.

The whole council was up for election due to boundary changes.

After the election, the composition of the council was:

Party	Seats	±
Labour	26	Steady
Conservative	21	▼2
Liberal Democrat	19	▲3
WIN	0	▼1

== Election results ==
=== Overall election result ===
Overall result compared with 2003.

Wirral Metropolitan Borough Council election result, 2004
Party	Candidates				Votes		
Party	Stood	Elected	Net	% of total	%	№	Net %
Conservative	66	21	▼2	31.8	33.5	36,404	▼4.4
Liberal Democrats	66	19	▲3	28.8	30.0	32,530	▲3.0
Labour	62	26	Steady	39.4	29.6	32,135	▼1.8
Green	17	0	Steady	0.0	5.9	6,404	▲3.3
WIN	7	0	▼1	0.0	0.8	846	Steady
BNP	1	0	Steady	0.0	0.2	246	▲0.1

== Ward results ==
=== Bebington ===
Bebington (new boundaries)
Party	Candidate	Votes	%	±%
Conservative	Sheila Clarke (Note: Elected to serve a 4-year term.)	2,150	35.1	N/A
Labour	Keith Williams (Note: Elected to serve a 3-year term.)	2,131	34.8	N/A
Conservative	Leslie Thomas (Note: Elected to serve a 2-year term.)	2,104	–	–
Labour	Anna McLaughlin	2,097	–	–
Labour	Walter Smith	2,034	–	–
Conservative	Jacqueline Hall	1,875	–	–
Liberal Democrats	Edward Rayner	1,227	20.0	N/A
Liberal Democrats	Gary Booth	1,225	–	–
Liberal Democrats	Stuart Southern	985	–	–
Green	Michael Harper	617	10.1	N/A
Majority		19	0.3	N/A
Registered electors		12,066		
Turnout			49.2	N/A
Conservative win (new seat)				
Labour win (new seat)				
Conservative win (new seat)				

=== Bidston and St James ===
Bidston and St James (new ward)
Party	Candidate	Votes	%	±%
Labour	John Cocker	1,786	68.5	N/A
Labour	Harry Smith	1,716	–	–
Labour	Ann McLachlan	1,559	–	–
Liberal Democrats	John Tomlinson	439	16.8	N/A
Liberal Democrats	Paul Gilbert	429	–	–
Liberal Democrats	Tamara Gilbert	418	–	–
Conservative	Audrey Clare	382	14.7	N/A
Conservative	Harold Hall	358	–	–
Conservative	John Laing	356	–	–
Majority		1,347	51.7	N/A
Registered electors		10,638		
Turnout			27.2	N/A
Labour win (new seat)				
Labour win (new seat)				
Labour win (new seat)				

=== Birkenhead and Tranmere ===
Birkenhead and Tranmere (new ward)
Party	Candidate	Votes	%	±%
Labour	Jean Stapleton	1,400	47.7	N/A
Labour	Phillip Davies	1,292	–	–
Labour	David Christian	1,275	–	–
WIN	Andrew Dow	408	13.9	N/A
Liberal Democrats	Phillip Lloyd	401	13.7	N/A
WIN	Deirdre Baker	382	–	–
Liberal Democrats	Alan Brighouse	376	–	–
Liberal Democrats	Margaret Teggin	349	–	–
WIN	John Maher	311	–	–
Green	Catherine Page	249	8.5	N/A
BNP	John Edwards	246	8.4	N/A
Conservative	Tom Parker	233	7.9	N/A
Conservative	Kenneth Jackson	217	–	–
Conservative	Elizabeth Johnson	186	–	–
Majority		992	33.8	N/A
Registered electors		10,364		
Turnout			27.0	N/A
Labour win (new seat)				
Labour win (new seat)				
Labour win (new seat)				

=== Bromborough ===
Bromborough (new boundaries)
Party	Candidate	Votes	%	±%
Liberal Democrats	Stephen Niblock	2,633	57.1	N/A
Liberal Democrats	Robert Moon	2,517	–	–
Liberal Democrats	Alan Taylor	2,335	–	–
Labour	Joseph Walsh	1,146	24.8	N/A
Labour	Andrew Page	1,049	–	–
Labour	Audrey Moore	1,017	–	–
Conservative	Allan Guy	460	10.0	N/A
Conservative	Kathryn Hodson	433	–	–
Conservative	Barbara Rothwell	392	–	–
Green	Ann Jones	260	5.6	N/A
WIN	Kathleen Parr	114	2.5	N/A
Majority		1,487	32.3	N/A
Registered electors		10,833		
Turnout			41.6	N/A
Liberal Democrats win (new seat)				
Liberal Democrats win (new seat)				
Liberal Democrats win (new seat)				

=== Clatterbridge ===
Clatterbridge (new boundaries)
Party	Candidate	Votes	%	±%
Liberal Democrats	Isabel Moon	3,243	48.3	N/A
Liberal Democrats	Alan Jennings	2,817	–	–
Liberal Democrats	Christopher Teggin	2,298	–	–
Conservative	Irena Povall	2,184	32.5	N/A
Conservative	David Kirwan	2,025	–	–
Conservative	Alexander Melbourne	1,841	–	–
Labour	Robert Buckingham	952	14.2	N/A
Labour	Ethel Morgan	931	–	–
Labour	Christina Muspratt	893	–	–
Green	Lesley Hussenbux	341	5.1	N/A
Majority		1,059	15.8	N/A
Registered electors		11,964		
Turnout			52.9	N/A
Liberal Democrats win (new seat)				
Liberal Democrats win (new seat)				
Liberal Democrats win (new seat)				

=== Claughton ===
Claughton (new boundaries)
Party	Candidate	Votes	%	±%
Labour	George Davies	2,187	51.3	N/A
Labour	Stephen Foulkes	2,124	–	–
Labour	Denise Roberts	2,003	–	–
Conservative	Peter Hartley	1,101	25.8	N/A
Conservative	Alan Robinson	959	–	–
Conservative	David Kingsley-Lote	949	–	–
Liberal Democrats	Roy Wood	692	16.2	N/A
Liberal Democrats	Anna Blumenthal	682	–	–
Liberal Democrats	Anthony Molyneux	659	–	–
Green	Joyce Hogg	282	6.6	N/A
Green	Khalid Hussenbux	259	–	–
Green	Christopher Childe	253	–	–
Majority		1,086	25.5	N/A
Registered electors		11,203		
Turnout			40.4	N/A
Labour win (new seat)				
Labour win (new seat)				
Labour win (new seat)				

=== Eastham ===
Eastham (new boundaries)
Party	Candidate	Votes	%	±%
Liberal Democrats	Phillip Gilchrist	4,160	71.1	N/A
Liberal Democrats	George Mitchell	3,328	–	–
Liberal Democrats	Thomas Harney	3,217	–	–
Labour	Anita Clarke	793	13.5	N/A
Conservative	Barbara Green	655	11.2	N/A
Conservative	Brian Stewart	538	–	–
Conservative	Susan Bebell	527	–	–
Green	Brian Gibbs	246	4.2	N/A
Majority		3,367	57.6	N/A
Registered electors		11,096		
Turnout			48.4	N/A
Liberal Democrats win (new seat)				
Liberal Democrats win (new seat)				
Liberal Democrats win (new seat)				

=== Greasby, Frankby and Irby ===
Greasby, Frankby and Irby (new ward)
Party	Candidate	Votes	%	±%
Liberal Democrats	Gillian Gardiner	2,873	46.6	N/A
Liberal Democrats	Peter Reisdorf	2,793	–	–
Liberal Democrats	Jean Quinn	2,714	–	–
Conservative	Susan Amyes	2,474	40.1	N/A
Conservative	Marcus Darby	2,398	–	–
Conservative	Kenneth Young	2,369	–	–
Labour	Barbara Moores	815	13.2	N/A
Labour	Jean Wood	806	–	–
Labour	Maureen Oldham	775	–	–
Majority		399	6.5	N/A
Registered electors		11,712		
Turnout			53.2	N/A
Liberal Democrats win (new seat)				
Liberal Democrats win (new seat)				
Liberal Democrats win (new seat)				

=== Heswall ===
Heswall (new boundaries)
Party	Candidate	Votes	%	±%
Conservative	Peter Johnson	3,844	58.1	N/A
Conservative	Andrew Hodson	3,655	–	–
Conservative	Stephen Rowlands	3,591	–	–
Liberal Democrats	David Evans	1,202	18.2	N/A
Liberal Democrats	Ronald Bozman	1,090	–	–
Liberal Democrats	Edward Norton	1,011	–	–
Labour	James Brown	820	12.4	N/A
Green	Patrick Cleary	755	11.4	N/A
Majority		2,642	39.9	N/A
Registered electors		11,060		
Turnout			55.3	N/A
Conservative win (new seat)				
Conservative win (new seat)				
Conservative win (new seat)				

=== Hoylake and Meols ===
Hoylake and Meols (new ward)
Party	Candidate	Votes	%	±%
Conservative	John Hale	3,043	53.5	N/A
Conservative	Gerald Ellis	3,032	–	–
Conservative	Hilary Jones	2,530	–	–
Liberal Democrats	Jane Otterson	1,168	20.5	N/A
Labour	Stuart Wade	955	16.8	N/A
Labour	Ian Cannon	953	–	–
Liberal Democrats	Sally Gardiner	878	–	–
Labour	Michael Benson	797	–	–
Liberal Democrats	Michael Redfern	791	–	–
Green	Shirley Johnson	526	9.2	N/A
Majority		1,875	33.0	N/A
Registered electors		10,608		
Turnout			50.0	N/A
Conservative win (new seat)				
Conservative win (new seat)				
Conservative win (new seat)				

=== Leasowe and Moreton East ===
Leasowe and Moreton East (new ward)
Party	Candidate	Votes	%	±%
Labour	Ernest Prout	1,981	53.3	N/A
Labour	Ronald Abbey	1,909	–	–
Labour	Iris Coates	1,695	–	–
Conservative	Vida Wilson	1,218	32.8	N/A
Conservative	Heather Murray	1,184	–	–
Conservative	Michael Holt	1,163	–	–
Liberal Democrats	Susanne Uriel	516	13.9	N/A
Liberal Democrats	Valerie Coast	425	–	–
Liberal Democrats	Michael Peck	398	–	–
Majority		763	20.5	N/A
Registered electors		10,831		
Turnout			37.0	N/A
Labour win (new seat)				
Labour win (new seat)				
Labour win (new seat)				

=== Liscard ===
Liscard (new boundaries)
Party	Candidate	Votes	%	±%
Labour	David Hawkins	1,908	44.2	N/A
Labour	Gary Leech	1,789	–	–
Labour	Christine Jones	1,776	–	–
Conservative	Leah Fraser	1,760	40.7	N/A
Conservative	Karen Hayes	1,516	–	–
Conservative	Mark Williams	1,450	–	–
Liberal Democrats	Raymond Price	653	15.1	N/A
Liberal Democrats	Mabel Uriel	630	–	–
Liberal Democrats	Hope Warner	590	–	–
Majority		148	3.5	N/A
Registered electors		11,389		
Turnout			39.2	N/A
Labour win (new seat)				
Labour win (new seat)				
Labour win (new seat)				

=== Moreton West and Saughall Massie ===
Moreton West and Saughall Massie (new ward)
Party	Candidate	Votes	%	±%
Conservative	Christopher Blakeley	2,666	56.3	N/A
Conservative	Suzanne Moseley	2,534	–	–
Conservative	Simon Mountney	2,218	–	–
Labour	Colin Winstanley	1,345	28.4	N/A
Labour	Ronald Johnston	1,340	–	–
Labour	James Crabtree	1,168	–	–
Liberal Democrats	Eric Copestake	723	15.3	N/A
Liberal Democrats	Gerald Hainsworth	576	–	–
Liberal Democrats	Catherine Jennings	466	–	–
Majority		1,321	27.9	N/A
Registered electors		11,002		
Turnout			43.6	N/A
Conservative win (new seat)				
Conservative win (new seat)				
Conservative win (new seat)				

=== New Brighton ===
New Brighton (new boundaries)
Party	Candidate	Votes	%	±%
Labour	Patrick Hackett	1,807	37.3	N/A
Conservative	Anthony Pritchard	1,800	37.2	N/A
Conservative	William Duffey	1,672	–	–
Labour	Therese Irving	1,657	–	–
Conservative	Ian Lewis	1,606	–	–
Labour	William Nock	1,282	–	–
Liberal Democrats	Jonathan Richardson	670	13.8	N/A
Liberal Democrats	Julia Codling	612	–	–
Liberal Democrats	John Codling	582	–	–
Green	Alison Rostron	565	11.7	N/A
Majority		7	0.1	N/A
Registered electors		11,072		
Turnout			41.4	N/A
Labour win (new seat)				
Conservative win (new seat)				
Conservative win (new seat)				

=== Oxton ===
Oxton (new boundaries)
Party	Candidate	Votes	%	±%
Liberal Democrats	Patricia Williams	3,295	58.6	N/A
Liberal Democrats	Stuart Kelly	3,074	–	–
Liberal Democrats	Freda Anderson	2,924	–	–
Labour	David Barden	999	17.8	N/A
Labour	Michael Eastwood	997	–	–
Labour	John Mitchell	985	–	–
Conservative	Leonard Moore	843	15.0	N/A
Conservative	Barbara Evans	663	–	–
Conservative	June Cowan	661	–	–
Green	Garnette Bowler	489	8.7	N/A
Majority		2,296	40.8	N/A
Registered electors		11,269		
Turnout			42.7	N/A
Liberal Democrats win (new seat)				
Liberal Democrats win (new seat)				
Liberal Democrats win (new seat)				

=== Pensby and Thingwall ===
Pensby and Thingwall (new ward)
Party	Candidate	Votes	%	±%
Conservative	Ian Mackenzie	2,037	35.0	N/A
Conservative	Jacqueline McKelvie	2,033	–	–
Liberal Democrats	Oliver Adam	1,894	32.5	N/A
Conservative	Ian McKellar	1,810	–	–
Liberal Democrats	Susan Welshman	1,427	–	–
Liberal Democrats	Christopher Jackson	1,329	–	–
Labour	John Cunningham	1,311	22.5	N/A
Labour	Francis McIver	1,265	–	–
Labour	David Kean	1,022	–	–
Green	Allen Burton	586	10.1	N/A
Majority		143	2.5	N/A
Registered electors		10,813		
Turnout			50.1	N/A
Conservative win (new seat)				
Conservative win (new seat)				
Liberal Democrats win (new seat)				

=== Prenton ===
Prenton (new boundaries)
Party	Candidate	Votes	%	±%
Liberal Democrats	Margaret Bridson	2,164	42.9	N/A
Liberal Democrats	Simon Holbrook	1,855	–	–
Liberal Democrats	Francis Doyle	1,832	–	–
Labour	Gerard Allen	1,476	29.3	N/A
Labour	Denise Realey	1,441	–	–
Labour	Barbara Lee	1,354	–	–
Conservative	Mark Davey-Hayford	905	17.9	N/A
Conservative	Jonathan Mackie	854	–	–
Conservative	Bozena Hillyer	779	–	–
WIN	Ann Adams	324	6.4	N/A
Green	Matthew Adams	176	3.5	N/A
WIN	Marita Grace	169	–	–
WIN	Wallace Sturrock	156	–	–
Majority		688	13.6	N/A
Registered electors		11,072		
Turnout			44.4	N/A
Liberal Democrats win (new seat)				
Liberal Democrats win (new seat)				
Liberal Democrats win (new seat)				

=== Rock Ferry ===
Rock Ferry (new ward)
Party	Candidate	Votes	%	±%
Labour	William Davies	1,783	56.0	N/A
Labour	Christine Meaden	1,640	–	–
Labour	Moira McLaughlin	1,448	–	–
Liberal Democrats	Peter Heppinstall	504	15.8	N/A
Conservative	Brenda Rampling	453	14.2	N/A
Conservative	Joanne Suffield	446	–	–
Green	Tina Fox	442	13.9	N/A
Liberal Democrats	Stephen Blaylock	441	–	–
Conservative	Robert Johnson	431	–	–
Liberal Democrats	Allan Brame	428	–	–
Majority		1,279	40.2	N/A
Registered electors		10,490		
Turnout			30.5	N/A
Labour win (new seat)				
Labour win (new seat)				
Labour win (new seat)				

=== Seacombe ===
Seacombe (new boundaries)
Party	Candidate	Votes	%	±%
Labour	John Salter	1,940	61.0	N/A
Labour	Denis Knowles	1,853	–	–
Labour	Adrian Jones	1,813	–	–
Liberal Democrats	Richard Ellett	629	19.8	N/A
Conservative	Christopher Wellstead	613	19.3	N/A
Conservative	Robert Sherlock	528	–	–
Liberal Democrats	Jean Norton	442	–	–
Liberal Democrats	Terence Pitt	440	–	–
Conservative	Kenneth Wilson	422	–	–
Majority		1,311	41.2	N/A
Registered electors		10,617		
Turnout			29.5	N/A
Labour win (new seat)				
Labour win (new seat)				
Labour win (new seat)				

=== Upton ===
Upton (new boundaries)
Party	Candidate	Votes	%	±%
Labour	Susan Brown	2,140	43.5	N/A
Labour	Patrick Smith	2,065	–	–
Labour	John George	1,829	–	–
Conservative	Julie Kirwan	1,300	26.4	N/A
Conservative	Kathleen Friel	1,261	–	–
Conservative	Jonathan Shone	1,160	–	–
Liberal Democrats	Geraldine Greineder	1,086	22.1	N/A
Liberal Democrats	Alan Davies	945	–	–
Liberal Democrats	Christopher Beazer	903	–	–
Green	George Bowler	396	8.0	N/A
Majority		840	17.1	N/A
Registered electors		12,384		
Turnout			40.6	N/A
Labour win (new seat)				
Labour win (new seat)				
Labour win (new seat)				

=== Wallasey ===
Wallasey (new boundaries)
Party	Candidate	Votes	%	±%
Conservative	Kate Wood	3,284	57.2	N/A
Conservative	David Hunt	3,094	—	—
Conservative	Lesley Rennie	2,996	—	—
Labour	Alexander Nuttall	1,576	27.4	N/A
Labour	Elizabeth McArdle	1,439	—	—
Labour	Moya Christey	1,400	—	—
Liberal Democrats	Moira Gallagher	886	15.4	N/A
Liberal Democrats	John Uriel	876	—	—
Liberal Democrats	Kevin Turner	624	—	—
Majority		1,708	29.8	N/A
Registered electors		12,039		
Turnout			48.3	N/A
Conservative win (new seat)				
Conservative win (new seat)				
Conservative win (new seat)				

=== West Kirby and Thurstaston ===
West Kirby and Thurstaston (new ward)
Party	Candidate	Votes	%	±%
Conservative	Geoffrey Watt	2,999	51.4	N/A
Conservative	David Elderton	2,840	—	—
Conservative	Jeffrey Green	2,814	—	—
Liberal Democrats	John Cresswell	1,472	25.3	N/A
Liberal Democrats	Charles Wall	1,387	—	—
Liberal Democrats	Sarah Quinn	1,245	—	—
Labour	Edna Davies	884	15.2	N/A
Labour	Dennis Woods	872	—	—
Labour	David Harper	670	—	—
Green	Perle Sheldricks	474	8.1	N/A
Majority		1,527	26.1	N/A
Registered electors		10,440		
Turnout			54.6	N/A
Conservative win (new seat)				
Conservative win (new seat)				
Conservative win (new seat)				

== Changes between 2004 and 2006 ==
Date	Ward	Name	Previous affiliation	New affiliation	Circumstance
November 2004	Hoylake and Meols	Hilary Jones	Conservative	Independent	Resigned.
April 2005	Pensby and Thingwall	Oliver Adam	Liberal Democrats	Conservative	Defected.
?	Hoylake and Meols	Hilary Jones	Independent	UKIP	Defected.

== Notes ==
• bold denotes the winning candidate
