= 2003 Wirral Metropolitan Borough Council election =

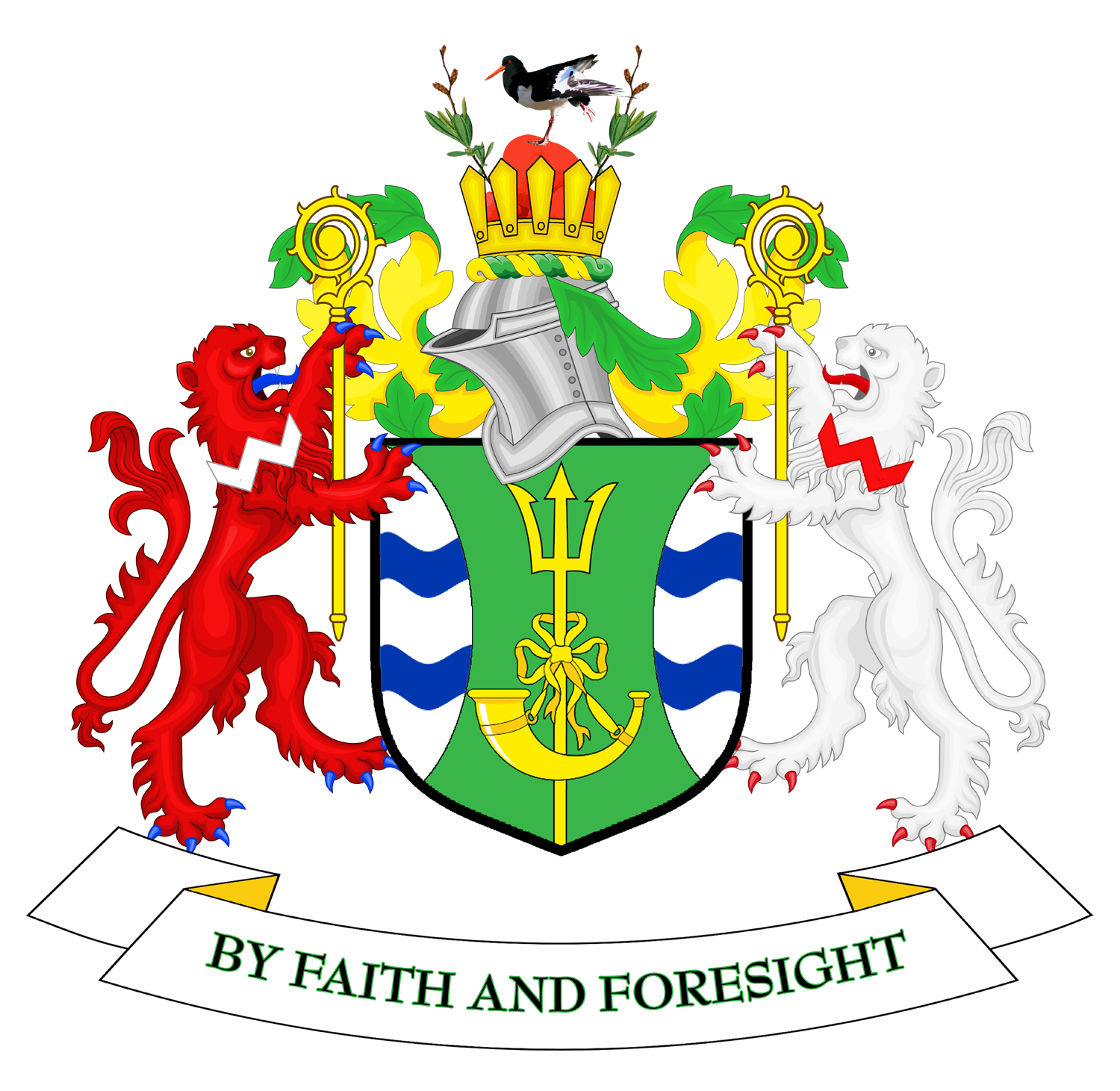
- 1 May 2003

21 of 66 seats (One Third) to Wirral Metropolitan Borough Council 34 seats needed for a majority
- Turnout: 27.9% (▼3.9%)
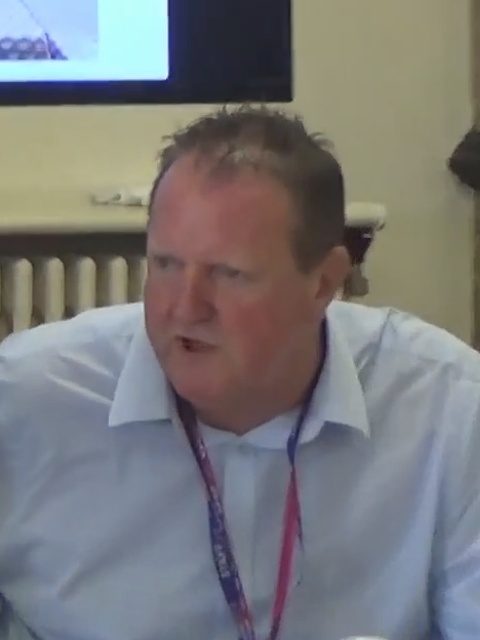

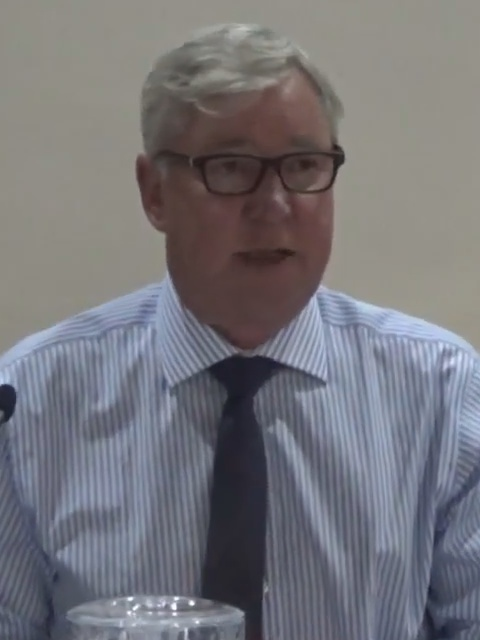

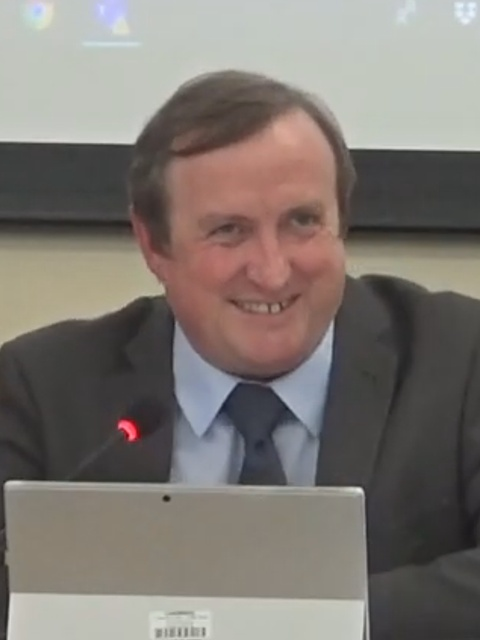
	First party	Second party	Third party
Leader	Steve Foulkes	Jeff Green	Stuart Kelly
Party	Labour	Conservative	Liberal Democrats
Leader's seat	Claughton	Thurstaston	Oxton
Last election	11 seats, 36.4%	6 seats, 35.3%	5 seats, 26.2%
Seats before	31	20	14
Seats won	8	8	6
Seats after	26	23	16
Seat change	▼5	▲3	▲2
Popular vote	21,725	26,220	18,668
Percentage	31.4%	37.9%	27.0%
Swing	▼5.0%	▲2.6%	▲0.8%
- Map of results of 2003 election
Leader of the Council before election
Steve Foulkes (Labour)
No Overall Control
Leader of the Council after election
Steve Foulkes (Labour)
No Overall Control

The 2003 Wirral Metropolitan Borough Council election took place on 1 May 2003 to elect members of Wirral Metropolitan Borough Council in England. This election was held on the same day as other local elections.

After the election, the composition of the council was:

Party	Seats	±
Labour	26	▼5
Conservative	23	▲3
Liberal Democrat	16	▲2
WIN	1	Steady

== Election results ==
=== Overall election result ===
Overall result compared with 2002.

Wirral Metropolitan Borough Council election result, 2003
Party	Candidates						Votes		
Party	Stood	Elected	Gained	Unseated	Net	% of total	%	No.	Net %
Conservative	22	8	4	1	▲3	36.4	37.9	26,220	▲2.6
Labour	22	8	0	5	▼5	36.4	31.4	21,725	▼5.0
Liberal Democrats	22	6	2	0	▲2	27.3	27.0	18,668	▲0.8
Green	14	0	0	0	Steady	0.0	2.6	1,773	▲0.8
WIN	6	0	0	0	Steady	0.0	0.8	553	New
UKIP	1	0	0	0	Steady	0.0	0.2	116	New
BNP	1	0	0	0	Steady	0.0	0.1	102	New
Socialist Alliance	1	0	0	0	Steady	0.0	0.1	45	New

== Ward results ==
Results compared directly with the last local election in 2002.

=== Bebington ===
Bebington
Party	Candidate	Votes	%	±%
Conservative	Leslie Thomas	1,402	40.0	▲3.3
Labour	Patrick Smith	1,364	38.9	▼7.8
Liberal Democrats	Kevin Sharkey	481	13.7	▲1.5
UKIP	John McCormack	116	3.3	New
Green	Michael Harper	92	2.6	▼1.7
WIN	Lynda Davies	53	1.5	New
Majority		38	1.1	N/A
Registered electors		10,797		
Turnout			32.5	▼4.9
Conservative gain from Labour		Swing	▲5.6	

=== Bidston ===
Bidston
Party	Candidate	Votes	%	±%
Labour	Harry Smith	860	72.5	▼1.2
WIN	Robert Ellis	143	12.1	New
Liberal Democrats	John Tomlinson	107	9.0	▲1.8
Conservative	Christopher Clare	76	6.4	▼0.7
Majority		717	60.4	▼1.4
Registered electors		7,309		
Turnout			16.2	▼5.0
Labour hold		Swing	▼0.7	

=== Birkenhead ===
Birkenhead
Party	Candidate	Votes	%	±%
Labour	Phillip Davies	1,157	70.3	▼10.1
Liberal Democrats	Philip Lloyd	188	11.4	▼1.3
Conservative	David Noble	118	7.2	▲0.4
WIN	John Maher	98	6.0	New
Socialist Alliance Against The War	Morag Reid	45	2.7	New
Green	Christopher Childe	40	2.4	New
Majority		969	58.9	▼8.8
Registered electors		9,867		
Turnout			16.7	▼1.8
Labour hold		Swing	▼4.4	

=== Bromborough ===
Bromborough
Party	Candidate	Votes	%	±%
Liberal Democrats	Alan Taylor	1,449	46.7	▼9.4
Labour	Anna McLaughlin	1,089	35.1	▲2.7
Conservative	Cherry Povall	568	18.3	▲8.7
Majority		360	11.6	▼12.1
Registered electors		10,961		
Turnout			28.3	▼4.5
Liberal Democrats gain from Labour		Swing	▼6.1	

=== Clatterbridge ===
Clatterbridge
Party	Candidate	Votes	%	±%
Liberal Democrats	Isabel Moon	2,655	53.0	▲2.0
Conservative	Brian Stewart	1,505	30.1	▲0.2
Labour	Andrew Page	718	14.3	▼3.0
Green	Ann Jones	128	2.6	▲0.8
Majority		1,150	22.9	▲1.8
Registered electors		13,806		
Turnout			36.3	▼6.2
Liberal Democrats hold		Swing	▲0.9	

=== Claughton ===
Claughton
Party	Candidate	Votes	%	±%
Labour	Denise Roberts	1,414	53.1	▼3.1
Conservative	David May	667	25.0	▲2.7
Liberal Democrats	Stephen Blaylock	434	16.3	▼1.5
Green	George Bowler	149	5.6	▲1.8
Majority		747	28.1	▼5.8
Registered electors		11,516		
Turnout			23.1	▼4.4
Labour hold		Swing	▼2.9	

=== Eastham ===
Eastham
Party	Candidate	Votes	%	±%
Liberal Democrats	George Mitchell	2,407	71.0	▲1.3
Labour	Audrey Moore	501	14.8	▼3.5
Conservative	Marcus Darby	390	11.5	▲1.9
Green	Brian Gibbs	63	1.9	▼0.5
WIN	Frederick Tooley	30	0.9	New
Majority		1,906	56.2	▲4.8
Registered electors		11,140		
Turnout			30.4	▼4.6
Liberal Democrats hold		Swing	▲2.4	

=== Egerton ===
Egerton
Party	Candidate	Votes	%	±%
Labour	Walter Smith	1,256	56.7	▼8.8
Liberal Democrats	Alan Brighouse	364	16.4	▲3.9
Conservative	Peter Hartley	274	12.4	▼4.1
WIN	Stanley Lamb	204	9.2	New
Green	Catherine Page	118	5.3	▼0.3
Majority		892	40.3	▼8.7
Registered electors		10,763		
Turnout			20.6	▼2.7
Labour hold		Swing	▼4.4	

=== Heswall ===
Heswall
Party	Candidate	Votes	%	±%
Conservative	Peter Johnson	3,128	70.9	▲6.6
Labour	Gary Leech	546	12.4	▼3.6
Liberal Democrats	Christopher Jackson	489	11.1	▼3.9
Green	Patrick Cleary	249	5.6	▲0.9
Majority		2,582	58.5	▲10.2
Registered electors		13,474		
Turnout			32.7	▼2.0
Conservative hold		Swing	▲5.1	

=== Hoylake ===
Hoylake
Party	Candidate	Votes	%	±%
Conservative	John Hale	2,694	64.2	▼1.4
Labour	Alan Milne	734	17.5	▼3.7
Liberal Democrats	Robert Wilkins	563	13.4	▲0.3
Green	Shirley Johnson	202	4.8	New
Majority		1,960	46.7	▲2.3
Registered electors		12,884		
Turnout			32.5	▼4.3
Conservative hold		Swing	▲1.2	

=== Leasowe ===
Leasowe
Party	Candidate	Votes	%	±%
Labour	Ernest Prout	1,147	52.4	▼5.7
Conservative	Vida Wilson	818	37.4	▲4.7
Liberal Democrats	Susanne Uriel	225	10.3	▲1.1
Majority		329	15.0	▼10.4
Registered electors		9,872		
Turnout			22.2	▼3.0
Labour hold		Swing	▼5.2	

=== Liscard ===
Liscard
Party	Candidate	Votes	%	±%
Conservative	Leah Fraser	1,459	50.3	▲9.0
Labour	John Cocker	1,095	37.7	▼10.8
Liberal Democrats	Neil Thomas	348	12.0	▲1.9
Majority		364	12.6	N/A
Registered electors		11,063		
Turnout			26.2	▼2.8
Conservative gain from Labour		Swing	▲9.9	

=== Moreton ===
Moreton
Party	Candidate	Votes	%	±%
Conservative	Suzanne Moseley	1,704	58.1	▲10.4
Labour	Ronald Johnston	949	32.4	▼10.7
Liberal Democrats	Eric Copestake	280	9.5	▲0.2
Majority		755	25.7	▲21.1
Registered electors		9,988		
Turnout			29.4	▼4.7
Conservative hold		Swing	▲10.6	

=== New Brighton ===
New Brighton
Party	Candidate	Votes	%	±%
Conservative	Bill Duffey	1,393	43.7	▲2.7
Labour	Therese Irving	1,339	42.0	▼5.1
Liberal Democrats	Julia Codling	459	14.4	▲2.5
Majority		54	1.7	New
Registered electors		11,804		
Turnout			27.0	▼3.2
Conservative gain from Labour		Swing	▲3.9	

=== Oxton ===
Oxton
Party	Candidate	Votes	%	±%
Liberal Democrats	Patricia Williams	1,705	60.2	▲5.5
Labour	John McElnay	525	18.5	▼5.2
Conservative	Leonard Moore	479	16.9	▼0.9
Green	Garnette Bowler	122	4.3	▲0.6
Majority		1,180	41.7	▲10.7
Registered electors		11,689		
Turnout			24.2	▼4.1
Liberal Democrats hold		Swing	▲5.4	

=== Prenton ===
Prenton
Party	Candidate	Votes	%	±%
Liberal Democrats	Simon Holbrook	1,888	57.0	▲3.6
Conservative	Ian McKellar	705	21.3	▼0.5
Labour	Gerard Allen	638	19.2	▼5.6
Green	Khalid Hussenbux	84	2.5	New
Majority		1,183	35.7	▲7.1
Registered electors		11,506		
Turnout			28.8	▼6.0
Liberal Democrats hold		Swing	▲3.6	

=== Royden ===
Royden
Party	Candidate	Votes	%	±%
Liberal Democrats	Gillian Gardiner	2,637	46.6	▲4.8
Conservative	Geoffrey Watt	2,457	43.4	▲0.6
Labour	Dennis Woods	480	8.5	▼5.1
Green	Perle Sheldricks	82	1.4	▼0.4
Majority		180	3.2	N/A
Registered electors		12,954		
Turnout			43.7	▲0.5
Liberal Democrats gain from Conservative		Swing	▲2.1	

=== Seacombe ===
Seacombe
Party	Candidate	Votes	%	±%
Labour	Adrian Jones	1,288	69.1	▲3.0
Liberal Democrats	John Codling	367	19.7	▼3.6
Conservative	Sita Sandhu	208	11.2	▲0.5
Majority		921	49.4	▲6.6
Registered electors		10,724		
Turnout			17.4	▼5.4
Labour hold		Swing	▲3.3	

=== Thurstaston ===
Thurstaston
Party	Candidate	Votes	%	±%
Conservative	Jeffrey Green	2,292	56.2	▲0.6
Labour	Christine Jones	959	23.5	▼4.3
Liberal Democrats	Jean Quinn	604	14.8	▲2.4
Green	Allen Burton	226	5.5	▲1.3
Majority		1,333	32.7	▲4.9
Registered electors		12,738		
Turnout			32.0	▼4.0
Conservative hold		Swing	▲2.5	

=== Tranmere ===
Tranmere
Party	Candidate	Votes	%	±%
Labour	Christine Meaden	1,076	69.8	▼4.9
Liberal Democrats	Christopher Teggin	149	9.7	▼0.4
Conservative	Barbara Poole	110	7.1	▼1.9
BNP	Stephen Smeltzer	102	6.6	New
Green	Stuart Harvey	80	5.2	▼1.1
WIN	Patricia Tyson	25	1.6	New
Majority		927	60.1	▼4.5
Registered electors		8,617		
Turnout			17.9	▼1.2
Labour hold		Swing	▼2.3	

=== Upton ===
Upton
Party	Candidate	Votes	%	±%
Labour	Peter Corcoran	1,531	46.4	▼4.7
Conservative	Kathleen Friel	1,222	37.0	▼0.8
Liberal Democrats	Christopher Beazer	408	12.4	▲1.3
Green	Percy Hogg	138	4.2	New
Majority		309	9.4	▼3.9
Registered electors		12,284		
Turnout			26.0	▼6.4
Labour hold		Swing	▼2.0	

=== Wallasey ===
Wallasey
Party	Candidate	Votes	%	±%
Conservative	Ian Lewis	2,551	62.7	▲1.0
Labour	Alexander Nuttall	1,059	26.0	▼1.0
Liberal Democrats	John Uriel	461	11.3	▼0.1
Majority		1,492	36.7	▲2.0
Registered electors		12,287		
Turnout			33.1	▼4.7
Conservative hold		Swing	▲1.0	

== Notes ==
• italics denote the sitting councillor • bold denotes the winning candidate
