= Seacombe (ward) =

Electoral ward of Wirral Merseyside, England

Seacombe (previously Seacombe-Poulton-Somerville, 1973 to 1979) is a Wirral Metropolitan Borough Council ward in the Wallasey Parliamentary constituency.

== Councillors ==
| Election | Councillor (Party) | Councillor (Party) | Councillor (Party) | Ref. |
|---|---|---|---|---|
| 1973 | Phoebe Bentzien (Labour) | T. Duffy (Labour) | S. Wickham (Labour) | |
| 1975 | Phoebe Bentzien (Labour) | T. Duffy (Labour) | S. Wickham (Labour) | |
| 1976 | Phoebe Bentzien (Labour) | T. Duffy (Labour) | S. Wickham (Labour) | |
| 1978 | Phoebe Bentzien (Labour) | T. Duffy (Labour) | S. Wickham (Labour) | |
| 1979 | Phoebe Bentzien (Labour) | T. Duffy (Labour) | S. Wickham (Labour) | |
| 1980 | Phoebe Bentzien (Labour) | T. Duffy (Labour) | S. Wickham (Labour) | |
| 1982 | A. Cowderoy (Labour) | T. Duffy (Labour) | S. Wickham (Labour) | |
| 1983 | A. Cowderoy (Labour) | T. Duffy (Labour) | Barney Gilfoyle (Labour) | |
| 1984 | A. Cowderoy (Labour) | G. Watkins (Labour) | Barney Gilfoyle (Labour) | |
| 1986 | A. Cowderoy (Labour) | G. Watkins (Labour) | Barney Gilfoyle (Labour) | |
| 1987 | A. Cowderoy (Labour) | G. Watkins (Labour) | G. Kenna (Labour) | |
| 1988 | A. Cowderoy (Labour) | P. Clee (Labour) | G. Kenna (Labour) | |
| 1990 | Janet Jackson (Labour) | P. Clee (Labour) | G. Kenna (Labour) | |
| 1991 | Janet Jackson (Labour) | P. Clee (Labour) | J. Scully (Labour) | |
| 1992 | Janet Jackson (Labour) | P. Clee (Labour) | J. Scully (Labour) | |
| 1994 | Janet Jackson (Labour) | P. Clee (Labour) | J. Scully (Labour) | |
| 1995 | Janet Jackson (Labour) | P. Clee (Labour) | Adrian Jones (Labour) | |
| 1996 | Janet Jackson (Labour) | P. Clee (Labour) | Adrian Jones (Labour) | |
| 1998 | Janet Jackson (Labour) | P. Clee (Labour) | Adrian Jones (Labour) | |
| 1999 | Janet Jackson (Labour) | P. Clee (Labour) | Adrian Jones (Labour) | |
| 2000 | Janet Jackson (Labour) | Denis Knowles (Labour /Conservative) | Adrian Jones (Labour) | |
| 2002 | John Salter (Labour) | Denis Knowles (Labour /Conservative) | Adrian Jones (Labour) | |
| 2003 | John Salter (Labour) | Denis Knowles (Labour /Conservative) | Adrian Jones (Labour) | |
| 2004 | John Salter (Labour) | Denis Knowles (Labour /Conservative) | Adrian Jones (Labour) | |
| 2006 | John Salter (Labour) | Denis Knowles (Labour /Conservative) | Adrian Jones (Labour) | |
| 2007 | John Salter (Labour) | Denis Knowles (Labour /Conservative) | Adrian Jones (Labour) | |
| 2008 | John Salter (Labour) | Denis Knowles (Labour /Conservative) | Adrian Jones (Labour) | |
| 2010 | John Salter (Labour) | Denis Knowles (Labour /Conservative) | Adrian Jones (Labour) | |
| 2011 | John Salter (Labour) | Chris Jones (Labour) | Adrian Jones (Labour) | |
| 2012 | John Salter (Labour) | Chris Jones (Labour) | Adrian Jones (Labour) | |
| 2014 | John Salter (Labour) | Chris Jones (Labour) | Adrian Jones (Labour) | |
| 2015 | John Salter (Labour) | Chris Jones (Labour) | Adrian Jones (Labour) | |
| 2016 | Paul Stuart (Labour) | Chris Jones (Labour) | Adrian Jones (Labour) | |
| 2018 | Paul Stuart (Labour) | Chris Jones (Labour) | Adrian Jones (Labour) | |
| 2019 | Paul Stuart (Labour) | Chris Jones (Labour) | Adrian Jones (Labour) | |
| 2021 | Paul Stuart (Labour) | Chris Jones (Labour) | Adrian Jones (Labour) | |
| 2022 | Paul Stuart (Labour) | Chris Jones (Labour) | John Hoey (Labour | |
