= Hoylake and Meols (ward) =

Electoral ward of Wirral, England

Hoylake and Meols (previously Central-Hoose-Meols-Park, 1973 to 1979, and Hoylake, 1979 to 2004) is a Wirral Metropolitan Borough Council ward in the Wirral West Parliamentary constituency.

== Councillors ==
Election	Councillor (Party)	Councillor (Party)	Councillor (Party)	Ref.
1973	Bill Whitehurst (Conservative)	Frank Jones (Conservative)	J. Thomas (Liberal)	
1975	Bill Whitehurst (Conservative)	Frank Jones (Conservative)	W. Tickle (Conservative)	
1976	Bill Whitehurst (Conservative)	Frank Jones (Conservative)	W. Tickle (Conservative)	
1978	Bill Whitehurst (Conservative)	Frank Jones (Conservative)	W. Tickle (Conservative)	
1979	Bill Whitehurst (Conservative)	Frank Jones (Conservative)	H. Thompson (Conservative)	
1980	Bill Whitehurst (Conservative)	Frank Jones (Conservative)	H. Thompson (Conservative)	
1982	R. Amyes (Conservative)	Frank Jones (Conservative)	H. Thompson (Conservative)	
1983	R. Amyes (Conservative)	Frank Jones (Conservative)	H. Thompson (Conservative)	
1984	R. Amyes (Conservative)	Frank Jones (Conservative)	H. Thompson (Conservative)	
1986	R. Amyes (Conservative)	Frank Jones (Conservative)	H. Thompson (Conservative)	
1987	R. Amyes (Conservative)	Frank Jones (Conservative)	P. Pedley (Conservative)	
1988	R. Amyes (Conservative)	Frank Jones (Conservative)	P. Pedley (Conservative)	
1990	R. Amyes (Conservative)	Frank Jones (Conservative)	P. Pedley (Conservative)	
1991	J. Stedmon (Conservative)	Frank Jones (Conservative)	John Hale (Conservative)	
1992	J. Stedmon (Conservative)	Frank Jones (Conservative)	John Hale (Conservative)	
1994	J. Stedmon (Conservative)	Frank Jones (Conservative)	John Hale (Conservative)	
1995	J. Stedmon (Conservative)	Frank Jones (Conservative)	John Hale (Conservative)	
1996	J. Stedmon (Conservative)	Hilary Jones (Conservative /Independent /UKIP)	John Hale (Conservative)	
1998	Gerry Ellis (Conservative)	Hilary Jones (Conservative /Independent /UKIP)	John Hale (Conservative)	
1999	Gerry Ellis (Conservative)	Hilary Jones (Conservative /Independent /UKIP)	John Hale (Conservative)	
2000	Gerry Ellis (Conservative)	Hilary Jones (Conservative /Independent /UKIP)	John Hale (Conservative)	
2002	Gerry Ellis (Conservative)	Hilary Jones (Conservative /Independent /UKIP)	John Hale (Conservative)	
2003	Gerry Ellis (Conservative)	Hilary Jones (Conservative /Independent /UKIP)	John Hale (Conservative)	
2004	Gerry Ellis (Conservative)	Hilary Jones (Conservative /Independent /UKIP)	John Hale (Conservative)	
2006	Gerry Ellis (Conservative)	David Kirwan (Conservative /Independent)	John Hale (Conservative)	
2007	Gerry Ellis (Conservative)	David Kirwan (Conservative /Independent)	John Hale (Conservative)	
2008	Gerry Ellis (Conservative)	David Kirwan (Conservative /Independent)	John Hale (Conservative)	
2010	Gerry Ellis (Conservative)	Eddie Boult (Conservative)	John Hale (Conservative)	
2011	Gerry Ellis (Conservative)	Eddie Boult (Conservative)	John Hale (Conservative)	
2012	Gerry Ellis (Conservative)	Eddie Boult (Conservative)	John Hale (Conservative)	
2014	Gerry Ellis (Conservative)	Eddie Boult (Conservative)	John Hale (Conservative)	
2015	Gerry Ellis (Conservative)	Eddie Boult (Conservative)	John Hale (Conservative)	
2016	Gerry Ellis (Conservative)	Eddie Boult (Conservative)	John Hale (Conservative)	
2018	Gerry Ellis (Conservative)	Tony Cox (Conservative)	Andrew Gardner (Conservative)	
2019	Alison Wright (Conservative)	Tony Cox (Conservative)	Andrew Gardner (Conservative)	
2021	Alison Wright (Conservative)	Tony Cox (Conservative)	Andrew Gardner (Conservative)	
2022	Alison Wright (Conservative)	Tony Cox (Conservative)	Andrew Gardner (Conservative)	
