= Bromborough (ward) =

Political subdivision in Merseyside, England

Bromborough (previously Park-New Ferry-North Bromborough, 1973 to 1979) is a Wirral Metropolitan Borough Council ward in the Wirral South Parliamentary constituency.

== Councillors ==
Election	Councillor (Party)	Councillor (Party)	Councillor (Party)	Ref.
1973	S. Price (Labour)	P. McCarthy (Labour)	F. Gregory (Labour)	
1975	S. Price (Labour)	P. McCarthy (Labour)	F. Gregory (Labour)	
1976	S. Price (Labour)	P. McCarthy (Labour)	F. Gregory (Labour)	
1978	S. Price (Labour)	P. McCarthy (Labour)	F. Gregory (Labour)	
1979	S. Price (Labour)	P. McCarthy (Labour)	Audrey Moore (Labour)	
1980	S. Price (Labour)	Ralph Dunning (Labour)	Audrey Moore (Labour)	
1982	E. Williams (Labour)	Ralph Dunning (Labour)	Audrey Moore (Labour)	
1983	E. Williams (Labour)	Ralph Dunning (Labour)	Audrey Moore (Labour)	
1984	E. Williams (Labour)	Dave Jackson (Labour)	Audrey Moore (Labour)	
1986	E. Williams (Labour)	Dave Jackson (Labour)	Audrey Moore (Labour)	
1987	E. Williams (Labour)	Dave Jackson (Labour)	A. Rose (Labour)	
1988	E. Williams (Labour)	Dave Jackson (Labour)	A. Rose (Labour)	
1990	A. Witter (Labour)	Dave Jackson (Labour)	A. Rose (Labour)	
1991	A. Witter (Labour)	Dave Jackson (Labour)	A. Rose (Labour)	
1992	A. Witter (Labour)	Dave Jackson (Labour)	A. Rose (Labour)	
1994	A. Witter (Labour)	Dave Jackson (Labour)	A. Rose (Labour)	
1995	A. Witter (Labour)	Dave Jackson (Labour)	R. Mullins (Labour)	
1996	A. Witter (Labour)	Dave Jackson (Labour)	R. Mullins (Labour)	
1998	A. Witter (Labour)	Dave Jackson (Labour)	R. Mullins (Labour)	
1999	A. Witter (Labour)	Dave Jackson (Labour)	Anna McLaughlin (Labour)	
2000	A. Witter (Labour)	Bob Moon (Liberal Democrats)	Anna McLaughlin (Labour)	
2002	Steve Niblock (Liberal Democrats /Labour /Independent)	Bob Moon (Liberal Democrats)	Anna McLaughlin (Labour)	
2003	Steve Niblock (Liberal Democrats /Labour /Independent)	Bob Moon (Liberal Democrats)	Alan Taylor (Liberal Democrats)	
2004	Steve Niblock (Liberal Democrats /Labour /Independent)	Bob Moon (Liberal Democrats)	Alan Taylor (Liberal Democrats)	
2006	Steve Niblock (Liberal Democrats /Labour /Independent)	Bob Moon (Liberal Democrats)	Alan Taylor (Liberal Democrats)	
2007	Steve Niblock (Liberal Democrats /Labour /Independent)	Bob Moon (Liberal Democrats)	Alan Taylor (Liberal Democrats)	
2008	Steve Niblock (Liberal Democrats /Labour /Independent)	Bob Moon (Liberal Democrats)	Alan Taylor (Liberal Democrats)	
2010	Steve Niblock (Liberal Democrats /Labour /Independent)	Bob Moon (Liberal Democrats)	Irene Williams (Labour)	
2011	Steve Niblock (Liberal Democrats /Labour /Independent)	Joe Walsh (Labour)	Irene Williams (Labour)	
2012	Steve Niblock (Liberal Democrats /Labour /Independent)	Joe Walsh (Labour)	Irene Williams (Labour)	
2014	Steve Niblock (Liberal Democrats /Labour /Independent)	Joe Walsh (Labour)	Irene Williams (Labour)	
2015	Steve Niblock (Liberal Democrats /Labour /Independent)	Joe Walsh (Labour)	Irene Williams (Labour)	
2016	Warren Ward (Labour)	Joe Walsh (Labour)	Irene Williams (Labour)	
2018	Warren Ward (Labour)	Joe Walsh (Labour)	Irene Williams (Labour)	
2018 by-election	Jo Bird (Labour /Independent /Green)	Joe Walsh (Labour)	Irene Williams (Labour)	
2019	Jo Bird (Labour /Independent /Green)	Joe Walsh (Labour)	Irene Williams (Labour)	
2021	Jo Bird (Labour /Independent /Green)	Joe Walsh (Labour)	Irene Williams (Labour)	
2022	Jo Bird (Labour /Independent /Green)	Joe Walsh (Labour)	Sue Percy (Labour)	
