= Bidston and St James (ward) =

Ward of Wirral, Merseyside, UK

Bidston and St James within Wirral

Bidston and St James (previously Gilbrook and St James, 1973 to 1979, and Bidston, 1979 to 2004) is a Wirral Metropolitan Borough Council ward in the Birkenhead Parliamentary constituency.

== Councillors ==
Election	Councillor (Party)	Councillor (Party)	Councillor (Party)	Ref.
1973	J. Flynn (Labour)	J. Roberts (Labour)	P. Roberts (Labour)	
1975	J. Flynn (Labour)	J. Roberts (Labour)	P. Roberts (Labour)	
1976	J. Flynn (Labour)	A. Jones (Labour)	P. Roberts (Labour)	
1978	J. Flynn (Labour)	A. Jones (Labour)	P. Roberts (Labour)	
1979	J. Flynn (Labour)	A. Jones (Labour)	Andrew Davies (Labour)	
1980	John Cocker (Labour)	A. Jones (Labour)	Andrew Davies (Labour)	
1982	John Cocker (Labour)	A. Jones (Labour)	Andrew Davies (Labour)	
1983	John Cocker (Labour)	A. Jones (Labour)	Andrew Davies (Labour)	
1984	John Cocker (Labour)	L. Stapleton (Labour)	Andrew Davies (Labour)	
1986	John Cocker (Labour)	L. Stapleton (Labour)	Andrew Davies (Labour)	
1987	John Cocker (Labour)	L. Stapleton (Labour)	Andrew Davies (Labour)	
1988	John Cocker (Labour)	J. Williams (Labour)	Andrew Davies (Labour)	
1990	Bill Nock (Labour)	J. Williams (Labour)	Andrew Davies (Labour)	
1991	Bill Nock (Labour)	J. Williams (Labour)	Harry Smith (Labour)	
1992	Bill Nock (Labour)	J. Williams (Labour)	Harry Smith (Labour)	
1994	Bill Nock (Labour)	J. Williams (Labour)	Harry Smith (Labour)	
1995	Bill Nock (Labour)	J. Williams (Labour)	Harry Smith (Labour)	
1996	Bill Nock (Labour)	J. Williams (Labour)	Harry Smith (Labour)	
1998	Bill Nock (Labour)	J. Williams (Labour)	Harry Smith (Labour)	
1999	Bill Nock (Labour)	J. Williams (Labour)	Harry Smith (Labour)	
2000	Bill Nock (Labour)	Jim Crabtree (Labour)	Harry Smith (Labour)	
2002	Bill Nock (Labour)	Jim Crabtree (Labour)	Harry Smith (Labour)	
2003	Bill Nock (Labour)	Jim Crabtree (Labour)	Harry Smith (Labour)	
2004	John Cocker (Labour)	Ann McLachlan (Labour)	Harry Smith (Labour)	
2006	John Cocker (Labour)	Ann McLachlan (Labour)	Harry Smith (Labour)	
2007	John Cocker (Labour)	Ann McLachlan (Labour)	Harry Smith (Labour)	
2008	Jim Crabtree (Labour)	Ann McLachlan (Labour)	Harry Smith (Labour)	
2010	Jim Crabtree (Labour)	Ann McLachlan (Labour)	Harry Smith (Labour)	
2011	Jim Crabtree (Labour)	Ann McLachlan (Labour)	Harry Smith (Labour)	
2012	Jim Crabtree (Labour)	Ann McLachlan (Labour)	Harry Smith (Labour)	
2014	Jim Crabtree (Labour)	Ann McLachlan (Labour)	Harry Smith (Labour)	
2015	Jim Crabtree (Labour)	Ann McLachlan (Labour)	Brian Kenny (Labour)	
2016	Julie McManus (Labour)	Ann McLachlan (Labour)	Brian Kenny (Labour)	
2018	Julie McManus (Labour)	Liz Grey (Labour)	Brian Kenny (Labour)	
2019	Julie McManus (Labour)	Liz Grey (Labour)	Brian Kenny (Labour)	
2021	Julie McManus (Labour)	Liz Grey (Labour)	Brian Kenny (Labour)	
2022	Julie McManus (Labour)	Liz Grey (Labour)	Brian Kenny (Labour)	
