= 1984 Wirral Metropolitan Borough Council election =

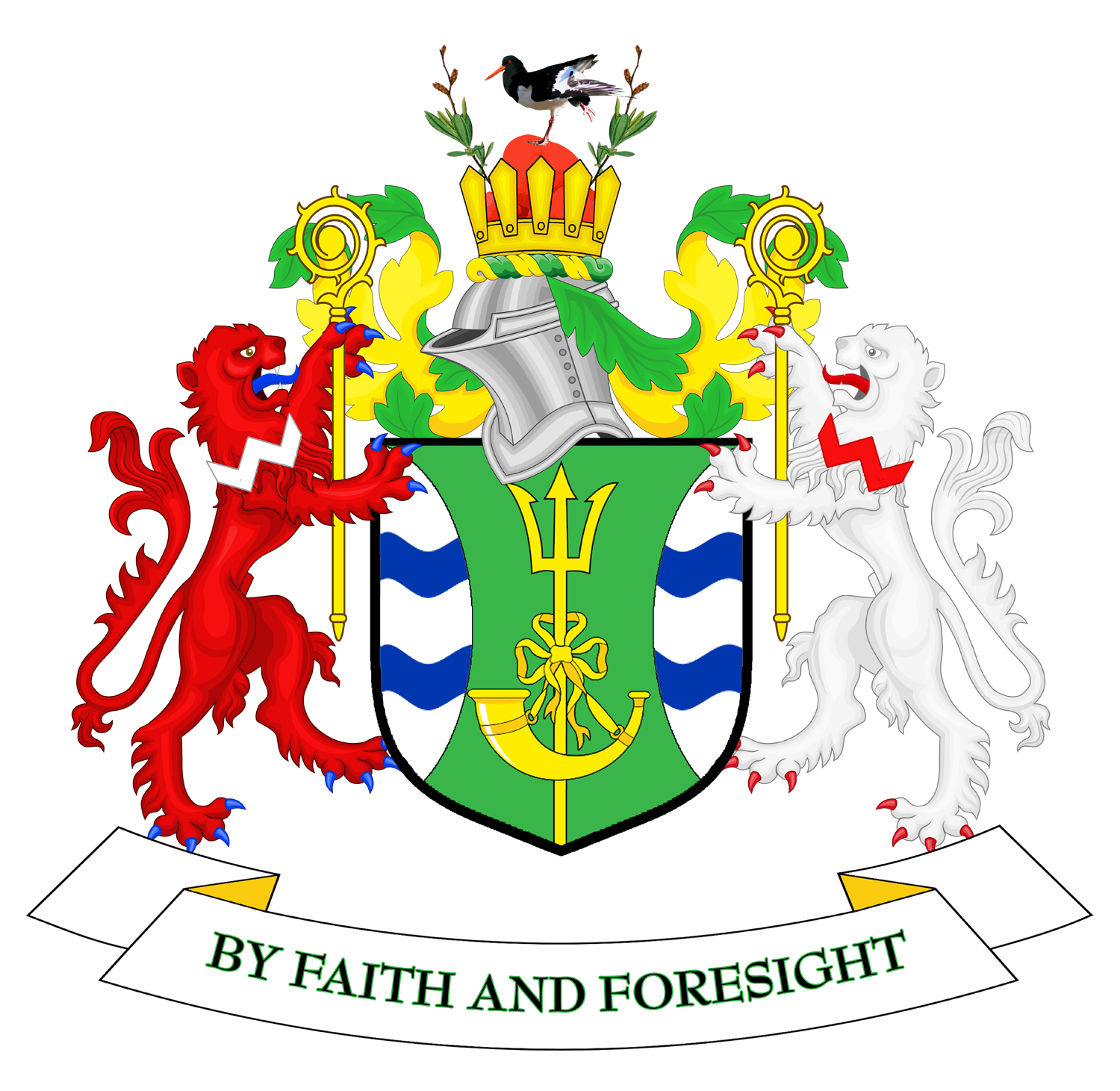
- 3 May 1984

22 of 66 seats (One Third) to Wirral Metropolitan Borough Council 34 seats needed for a majority
- Turnout: 43.3% (▲0.6%)
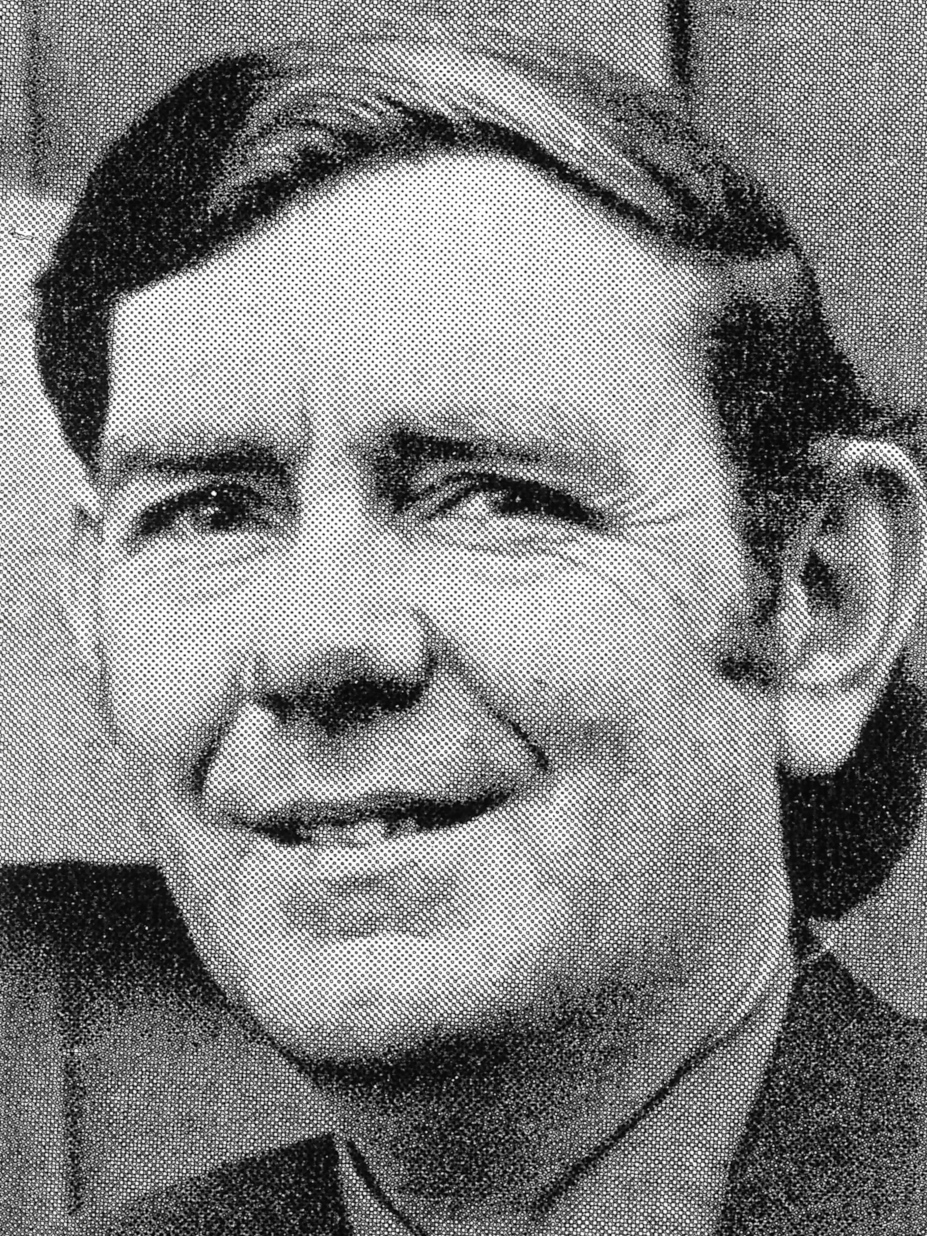
	First party	Second party	Third party
		Lab	SDP–Lib
Leader	David Fletcher	George Clark	Roy Perkins
Party	Conservative	Labour	Alliance
Leader's seat	Thurstaston	Leasowe	Claughton
Last election	11 seats, 44.7%	8 seats, 35.3%	3 seats, 19.9%
Seats before	34	24	8
Seats won	12	8	2
Seats after	34	24	8
Seat change	Steady	Steady	Steady
Popular vote	48,597	43,096	21,480
Percentage	42.9%	38.0%	18.9%
Swing	▼1.8%	▲2.7%	▼1.0%
- Map of results of 1984 election
Leader of the Council before election
David Fletcher
Conservative
Leader of the Council after election
David Fletcher
Conservative

The 1984 Wirral Metropolitan Borough Council election took place on 3 May 1984 to elect members of Wirral Metropolitan Borough Council in England. This election was held on the same day as other local elections.

After the election, the composition of the council was:

Party	Seats	±
Conservative	34	Steady
Labour	24	Steady
Alliance	8	Steady

== Election results ==
=== Overall election result ===
Overall result compared with 1983.

Wirral Metropolitan Borough Council election results, 1984
Party	Candidates						Votes		
Party	Stood	Elected	Gained	Unseated	Net	% of total	%	No.	Net %
Conservative	22	12	1	1	Steady	54.5	42.9	48,597	▼1.8
Labour	22	8	0	0	Steady	36.4	38.0	43,096	▲2.7
Alliance	22	2	1	1	Steady	9.1	18.9	21,480	▼1.0
Ind. Conservative	1	0	0	0	Steady	0.0	0.1	147	N/A
Ecology	1	0	0	0	Steady	0.0	0.0	56	N/A

== Ward results ==
=== Bebington ===
Bebington
Party	Candidate	Votes	%	±%
Conservative	Tim Richmond	3,208	55.2	▼1.4
Labour	P. McCarthy	1,790	30.8	▲2.3
Alliance	M. Miller	818	14.1	▼0.8
Majority		1,418	24.4	▼3.8
Registered electors		11,572		
Turnout			50.3	▼0.5
Conservative hold		Swing	▼1.9	

=== Bidston ===
Bidston
Party	Candidate	Votes	%	±%
Labour	L. Stapleton	3,431	83.0	▲2.7
Conservative	W. Houldin	444	10.7	▼0.4
Alliance	J. Hughes	258	6.2	▼2.4
Majority		2,987	72.3	▲3.1
Registered electors		10,970		
Turnout			37.7	▲0.6
Labour hold		Swing	▲1.6	

=== Birkenhead ===
Birkenhead
Party	Candidate	Votes	%	±%
Labour	William Lungley	3,027	73.5	▲6.9
Alliance	Stephen Niblock	589	14.3	▼6.6
Conservative	Hilary Jones	503	12.2	▼0.4
Majority		2,438	59.2	▲13.5
Registered electors		11,563		
Turnout			35.6	▼1.5
Labour hold		Swing	▲6.8	

=== Bromborough ===
Bromborough
Party	Candidate	Votes	%	±%
Labour	David Jackson	2,824	50.8	▲2.4
Conservative	J. Byrne	2,002	36.0	▼1.4
Alliance	F. Mushrow	734	13.2	▼1.0
Majority		822	14.8	▲3.8
Registered electors		11,764		
Turnout			47.3	▲3.9
Labour hold		Swing	▲3.9	

=== Clatterbridge ===
Clatterbridge
Party	Candidate	Votes	%	±%
Conservative	Michael Moore	3,753	59.4	▼3.0
Labour	G. Farmer	1,437	22.8	▲1.6
Alliance	P. Lloyd	1,124	17.8	▲1.5
Majority		2,316	36.7	▼4.5
Registered electors		13,805		
Turnout			45.7	▼1.1
Conservative hold		Swing	▼2.3	

=== Claughton ===
Claughton
Party	Candidate	Votes	%	±%
Conservative	Ian McKellar	2,047	38.4	▲3.2
Alliance	V. Quinn	1,705	32.0	▼7.0
Labour	M. Yates	1,580	29.6	▲3.8
Majority		342	6.4	N/A
Registered electors		10,795		
Turnout			49.4	▲1.1
Conservative gain from Alliance		Swing	▲5.1	

=== Eastham ===
Eastham
Party	Candidate	Votes	%	±%
Alliance	D. Charles	2,364	40.5	▲0.8
Labour	M. Benson	1,754	30.0	▲2.5
Conservative	I. Allison	1,722	29.5	▼3.4
Majority		610	10.4	▲3.6
Registered electors		12,133		
Turnout			48.1	▼2.5
Alliance gain from Conservative		Swing	▲1.9	

=== Egerton ===
Egerton
Party	Candidate	Votes	%	±%
Labour	T. McGenity	2,712	56.0	▲5.5
Conservative	M. Cureton	1,465	30.2	▼2.5
Alliance	Simon Holbrook	670	13.8	▼3.0
Majority		1,247	25.7	▲7.9
Registered electors		11,580		
Turnout			41.9	▼1.6
Labour hold		Swing	▲4.0	

=== Heswall ===
Heswall
Party	Candidate	Votes	%	±%
Conservative	M. Banks	3,997	71.6	▼2.9
Alliance	G. Collins	1,047	18.8	▲2.5
Labour	J. Prendiville	535	9.6	▲0.3
Majority		2,950	52.9	▼5.3
Registered electors		12,999		
Turnout			42.9	▲0.5
Conservative hold		Swing	▼2.7	

=== Hoylake ===
Hoylake
Party	Candidate	Votes	%	±%
Conservative	Frank Jones	3,534	65.7	▲0.7
Alliance	J. Otterson	1,180	21.9	▼4.0
Labour	I. Millichap	664	12.3	▲3.2
Majority		2,354	43.8	▲4.7
Registered electors		12,520		
Turnout			43.0	▼1.6
Conservative hold		Swing	▲2.4	

=== Leasowe ===
Leasowe
Party	Candidate	Votes	%	±%
Labour	Jim Edwards	2,362	62.7	▲0.2
Conservative	E. Sanders	1,071	28.4	▲2.5
Alliance	Peter Reisdorf	337	8.9	▼2.6
Majority		1,291	34.2	▼2.4
Registered electors		10,718		
Turnout			35.2	▼0.9
Labour hold		Swing	▼1.2	

=== Liscard ===
Liscard
Party	Candidate	Votes	%	±%
Conservative	M. Ebbs	2,164	41.9	▼5.8
Labour	William Nock	2,159	41.8	▲7.9
Alliance	Moira Gallagher	842	16.3	▼2.1
Majority		5	0.1	▼13.8
Registered electors		12,152		
Turnout			42.5	▲2.0
Conservative hold		Swing	▼6.9	

=== Moreton ===
Moreton
Party	Candidate	Votes	%	±%
Conservative	I. Walker	2,043	44.0	Steady
Labour	Stuart Marshall-Clarke	2,033	43.7	▲3.1
Alliance	J. Eyres	572	12.3	▼3.1
Majority		10	0.2	▼3.3
Registered electors		9,546		
Turnout			48.7	▲2.3
Conservative hold		Swing	▼1.6	

=== New Brighton ===
New Brighton
Party	Candidate	Votes	%	±%
Conservative	T. Higgins	2,431	47.0	▼6.2
Labour	P. Spruce	1,715	33.1	▲2.6
Alliance	J. Richardson	883	17.1	▲0.7
Ind. Conservative	A. Adams	147	2.8	New
Majority		716	13.8	▼8.9
Registered electors		11,861		
Turnout			43.6	▲6.9
Conservative hold		Swing	▼4.4	

=== Oxton ===
Oxton
Party	Candidate	Votes	%	±%
Alliance	Michael Cooke	2,454	43.6	▲2.4
Conservative	R. Firth	1,873	33.3	▼3.6
Labour	J. Dunn	1,245	22.1	▲0.9
Ecology	B. Pemberton	56	1.0	New
Majority		581	10.3	▲6.0
Registered electors		11,514		
Turnout			48.9	▲2.7
Alliance hold		Swing	▲3.0	

=== Prenton ===
Prenton
Party	Candidate	Votes	%	±%
Conservative	A. Clement	2,607	44.6	▼5.4
Labour	P. Taylor	1,988	34.0	▲1.6
Alliance	John Thornton	1,251	21.4	▲3.8
Majority		619	10.6	▼7.0
Registered electors		12,854		
Turnout			45.5	▼0.4
Conservative hold		Swing	▼3.5	

=== Royden ===
Royden
Party	Candidate	Votes	%	±%
Conservative	Derek Robinson	3,052	64.1	▼0.6
Alliance	F. Lewis	946	19.9	▼3.4
Labour	C. Holmes	765	16.1	▲4.0
Majority		2,106	44.2	▲2.8
Registered electors		12,267		
Turnout			38.8	▼0.1
Conservative hold		Swing	▲1.4	

=== Seacombe ===
Seacombe
Party	Candidate	Votes	%	±%
Labour	G. Watkins	3,281	67.7	▲6.7
Conservative	L. Kennedy	1,135	23.4	▼2.7
Alliance	D. Kelly	433	8.9	▼4.0
Majority		2,146	44.3	▲9.4
Registered electors		12,510		
Turnout			38.8	▲2.9
Labour hold		Swing	▲4.7	

=== Thurstaston ===
Thurstaston
Party	Candidate	Votes	%	±%
Conservative	Sid Dunn	3,478	68.1	▲1.5
Labour	M. Cooper	929	18.2	▲0.4
Alliance	S. Hassall	701	13.7	▼1.9
Majority		2,549	49.9	▲1.2
Registered electors		12,451		
Turnout			41.0	▼0.7
Conservative hold		Swing	▲0.6	

=== Tranmere ===
Tranmere
Party	Candidate	Votes	%	±%
Labour	R. Davies	2,882	73.9	▲3.5
Conservative	W. Lloyd	573	14.7	▼3.5
Alliance	W. Wood	447	11.5	▲0.1
Majority		2,309	59.2	▲7.0
Registered electors		11,137		
Turnout			35.0	▼1.9
Labour hold		Swing	▲3.5	

=== Upton ===
Upton
Party	Candidate	Votes	%	±%
Labour	Keith Rimmer	2,949	50.9	▲1.3
Conservative	W. McKenzie	1,934	33.4	▼1.5
Alliance	Eric Copestake	906	15.7	▲2.0
Majority		1,015	17.5	▲2.7
Registered electors		12,723		
Turnout			45.5	▲1.6
Labour hold		Swing	▲1.4	

=== Wallasey ===
Wallasey
Party	Candidate	Votes	%	±%
Conservative	Kate Wood	3,561	61.2	▼3.7
Alliance	B. Thomas	1,219	21.0	▲2.3
Labour	A. Barker	1,034	17.8	▲1.3
Majority		2,342	40.3	▼5.9
Registered electors		12,535		
Turnout			46.4	▲1.1
Conservative hold		Swing	▼3.0	

== Notes ==
• italics denote the sitting councillor • bold denotes the winning candidate
