= Claughton (ward) =

Electoral ward of Wirral, Merseyside, England

Claughton within Wirral

Claughton (previously Cathcart-Claughton-Cleveland, 1973 to 1979) is a Wirral Metropolitan Borough Council ward in the Birkenhead Parliamentary constituency.

== Councillors ==
Election	Councillor (Party)	Councillor (Party)	Councillor (Party)	Ref.
1973	A. Jones (Liberal)	John Evans (Liberal/Alliance)	Gruff Evans (Liberal)	
1975	A. Jones (Liberal)	John Evans (Liberal/Alliance)	Gruff Evans (Liberal)	
1976	A. Jones (Liberal)	John Evans (Liberal/Alliance)	Gruff Evans (Liberal)	
1978	A. Jones (Liberal)	John Evans (Liberal/Alliance)	Roy Perkins (Liberal/Alliance/Liberal Democrats)	
1979	P. Liddell (Labour)	John Evans (Liberal/Alliance)	Roy Perkins (Liberal/Alliance/Liberal Democrats)	
1980	P. Liddell (Labour)	John Evans (Liberal/Alliance)	Roy Perkins (Liberal/Alliance/Liberal Democrats)	
1982	P. Liddell (Labour)	John Evans (Liberal/Alliance)	Roy Perkins (Liberal/Alliance/Liberal Democrats)	
1983	R. Curtis (Alliance/Liberal Democrats)	John Evans (Liberal/Alliance)	Roy Perkins (Liberal/Alliance/Liberal Democrats)	
1984	R. Curtis (Alliance/Liberal Democrats)	Ian McKellar (Conservative)	Roy Perkins (Liberal/Alliance/Liberal Democrats)	
1986	R. Curtis (Alliance/Liberal Democrats)	Ian McKellar (Conservative)	Roy Perkins (Liberal/Alliance/Liberal Democrats)	
1987	R. Curtis (Alliance/Liberal Democrats)	Ian McKellar (Conservative)	Roy Perkins (Liberal/Alliance/Liberal Democrats)	
1988	R. Curtis (Alliance/Liberal Democrats)	George Davies (Labour)	Roy Perkins (Liberal/Alliance/Liberal Democrats)	
1990	R. Curtis (Alliance/Liberal Democrats)	George Davies (Labour)	Steve Foulkes (Labour)	
1991	Stuart Kelly (Liberal Democrats)	George Davies (Labour)	Steve Foulkes (Labour)	
1992	Stuart Kelly (Liberal Democrats)	George Davies (Labour)	Steve Foulkes (Labour)	
1994	Stuart Kelly (Liberal Democrats)	George Davies (Labour)	Steve Foulkes (Labour)	
1995	Andrew Day (Labour)	George Davies (Labour)	Steve Foulkes (Labour)	
1996	Andrew Day (Labour)	George Davies (Labour)	Steve Foulkes (Labour)	
1998	Andrew Day (Labour)	George Davies (Labour)	Steve Foulkes (Labour)	
1999	Denise Roberts (Labour)	George Davies (Labour)	Steve Foulkes (Labour)	
2000	Denise Roberts (Labour)	George Davies (Labour)	Steve Foulkes (Labour)	
2002	Denise Roberts (Labour)	George Davies (Labour)	Steve Foulkes (Labour)	
2003	Denise Roberts (Labour)	George Davies (Labour)	Steve Foulkes (Labour)	
2004	Denise Roberts (Labour)	George Davies (Labour)	Steve Foulkes (Labour)	
2006	Denise Roberts (Labour)	George Davies (Labour)	Steve Foulkes (Labour)	
2007	Denise Roberts (Labour)	George Davies (Labour)	Steve Foulkes (Labour)	
2008	Denise Roberts (Labour)	George Davies (Labour)	Steve Foulkes (Labour)	
2010	Denise Roberts (Labour)	George Davies (Labour)	Steve Foulkes (Labour)	
2011	Denise Roberts (Labour)	George Davies (Labour)	Steve Foulkes (Labour)	
2012	Denise Roberts (Labour)	George Davies (Labour)	Steve Foulkes (Labour)	
2014	Denise Roberts (Labour)	George Davies (Labour)	Steve Foulkes (Labour)	
2015	Denise Roberts (Labour)	George Davies (Labour)	Steve Foulkes (Labour)	
2016	Denise Roberts (Labour)	George Davies (Labour)	Steve Foulkes (Labour)	
2017 by-election	Gillian Wood (Labour)	George Davies (Labour)	Steve Foulkes (Labour)	
2018	Gillian Wood (Labour)	George Davies (Labour)	Steve Foulkes (Labour)	
2019	Gillian Wood (Labour)	George Davies (Labour)	Steve Foulkes (Labour)	
2021	Gillian Wood (Labour)	George Davies (Labour)	Steve Foulkes (Labour)	
2022	Gillian Wood (Labour)	George Davies (Labour)	Steve Foulkes (Labour)	

== Notes ==
• italics denote a sitting councillor • bold denotes the winning candidate
