= 1982 Wirral Metropolitan Borough Council election =

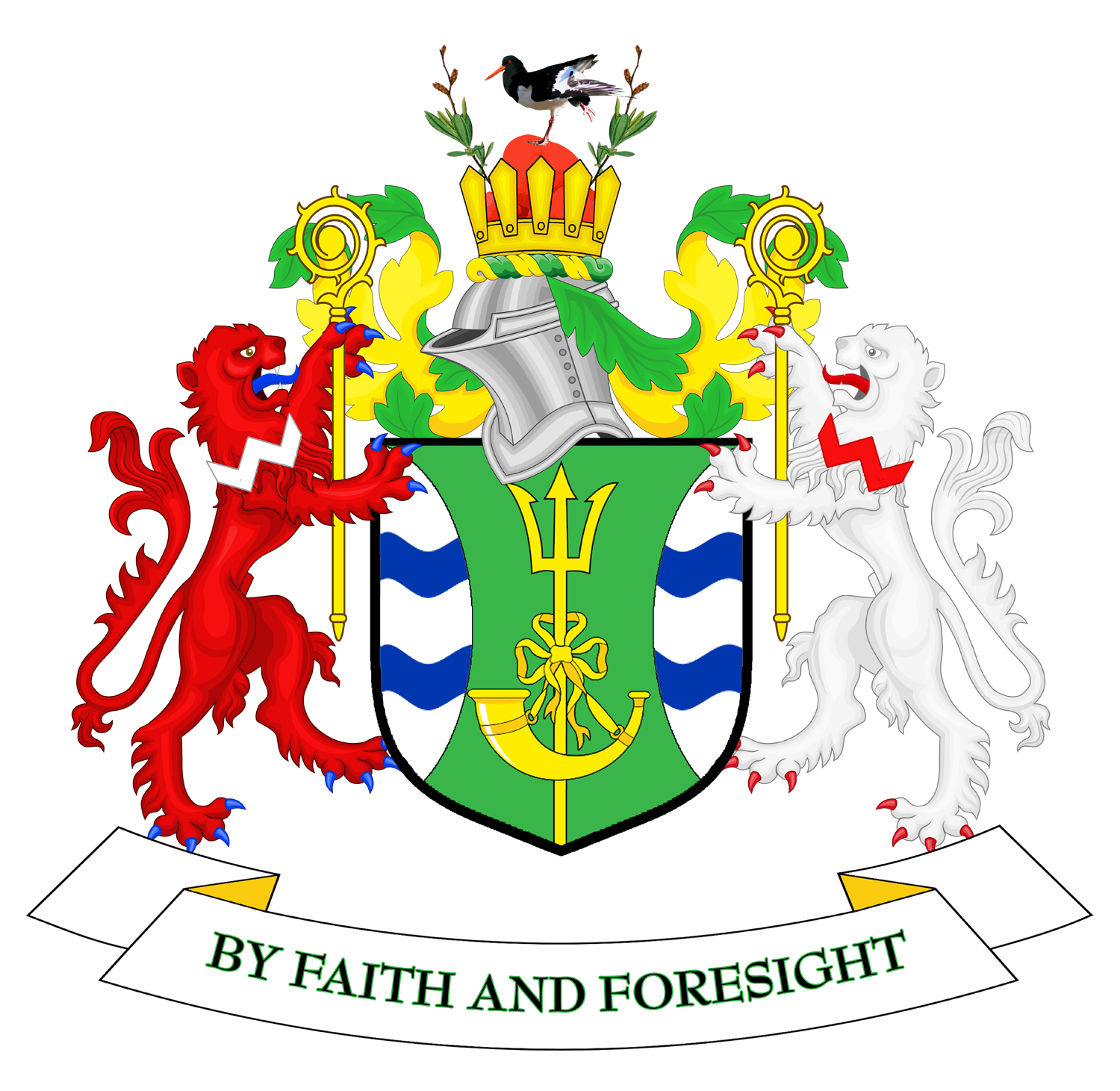
- 6 May 1982

22 of 66 seats (One Third) to Wirral Metropolitan Borough Council 34 seats needed for a majority
- Turnout: 40.5% (▲3.7%)
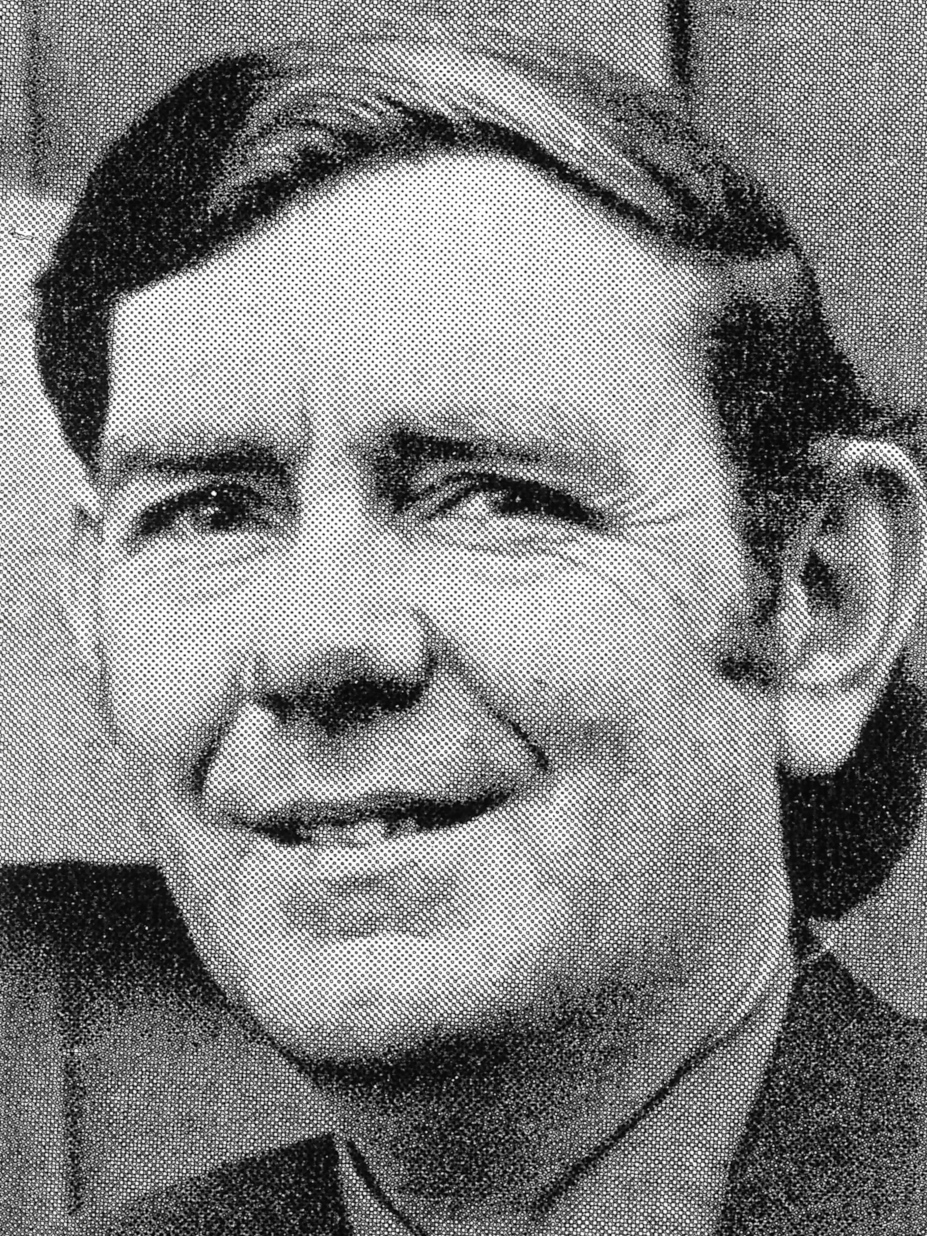
	First party	Second party	Third party
		Lab	SDP–Lib
Leader	David Fletcher	Andrew Davies	Roy Perkins
Party	Conservative	Labour	Alliance
Leader's seat	Thurstaston	Bidston	Claughton
Last election	12 seats, 46.3%	9 seats, 37.9%	2 seats, 15.4%
Seats before	37	23	6
Seats won	11	8	3
Seats after	35	25	6
Seat change	▼2	▲2	Steady
Popular vote	46,981	29,345	29,175
Percentage	44.5%	27.8%	27.6%
Swing	▼1.8%	▼10.1%	▲12.2%
- Map of results of 1982 election
Leader of the Council before election
David Fletcher
Conservative
Leader of the Council after election
David Fletcher
Conservative

The 1982 Wirral Metropolitan Borough Council election took place on 6 May 1982 to elect members of Wirral Metropolitan Borough Council in England. This election was held on the same day as other local elections.

The second third of the council was up for election to new boundaries.

After the election, the composition of the council was:

Party	Seats	±
Conservative	35	▼2
Labour	25	▲2
Alliance	6	Steady

== Election results ==
=== Overall election result ===
Overall result compared with 1980.

Wirral Metropolitan Borough Council election result, 1982
Party	Candidates				Votes		
Party	Stood	Elected	Net	% of total	%	№	Net %
Conservative	22	11	▼2	50.0	44.5	46,981	▼1.8
Labour	20	8	▲2	36.4	27.8	29,345	▼10.1
Alliance	22	3	Steady	13.6	27.6	29,175	▲12.2
Ecology	2	0	Steady	0.0	0.1	135	Steady

== Ward results ==
=== Bebington ===
Bebington
Party	Candidate	Votes	%	±%
Conservative	Frank Theaker	3,179	57.1	▼2.8
Labour	P. McCarthy	1,253	22.5	▼6.6
Alliance	M. Dooher	1,132	20.3	▲9.2
Majority		1,926	34.6	▲3.8
Registered electors		11,455		
Turnout			48.6	▲5.0
Conservative gain from (new seat)		Swing	▲1.9	

=== Bidston ===
Bidston
Party	Candidate	Votes	%	±%
Labour	John Cocker	2,933	75.5	▼5.9
Alliance	Patricia Williams	506	13.0	▲8.1
Conservative	T. Birkett	444	11.4	▼2.3
Majority		2,427	62.5	▼5.1
Registered electors		11,422		
Turnout			34.0	▲0.8
Labour hold		Swing	▼2.6	

=== Birkenhead ===
Birkenhead
Party	Candidate	Votes	%	±%
Labour	W. Craig	2,328	59.4	▼7.0
Alliance	C. Lloyd	1,081	27.6	▲7.0
Conservative	F. Dawson	507	12.9	▼0.1
Majority		1,247	31.8	▼13.9
Registered electors		11,780		
Turnout			33.2	▲3.7
Labour gain from (new seat)		Swing	▼7.0	

=== Bromborough ===
Bromborough
Party	Candidate	Votes	%	±%
Labour	E. Williams	1,993	40.8	▼11.5
Conservative	E. Davies	1,826	37.4	▲1.5
Alliance	H. Kelsall	1,066	21.8	▲10.0
Majority		167	3.4	▼13.1
Registered electors		11,606		
Turnout			42.1	▲0.2
Labour gain from (new seat)		Swing	▼6.5	

=== Clatterbridge ===
Clatterbridge
Party	Candidate	Votes	%	±%
Conservative	J. Zowe	3,700	60.7	▲0.8
Alliance	Thomas Harney	1,395	22.9	▲6.5
Labour	M. Benson	996	16.4	▼7.3
Majority		2,305	37.8	▲1.6
Registered electors		13,523		
Turnout			45.0	▲1.4
Conservative gain from (new seat)		Swing	▲0.8	

=== Claughton ===
Claughton
Party	Candidate	Votes	%	±%
Alliance	Roy Perkins	1,865	46.8	▲9.9
Conservative	Ian McKellar	1,073	26.9	▼5.7
Labour	A. Keating	988	24.8	▼3.3
Ecology	B. Pemberton	58	1.5	▼0.9
Majority		792	19.9	▲15.6
Registered electors		10,920		
Turnout			36.5	▼8.9
Alliance gain from (new seat)		Swing	▲7.8	

=== Eastham ===
Eastham
Party	Candidate	Votes	%	±%
Alliance	Phillip Gilchrist	3,021	51.8	▲22.1
Conservative	M. Evans	1,662	28.5	▼8.9
Labour	Geoff Barker	1,145	19.6	▼13.3
Majority		1,359	23.3	N/A
Registered electors		12,021		
Turnout			48.5	▲6.0
Alliance gain from (new seat)		Swing	▲13.9	

=== Egerton ===
Egerton
Party	Candidate	Votes	%	±%
Labour	Alec Dunn	1,755	39.4	▼5.1
Conservative	Myrra Lea	1,615	36.3	▲2.9
Alliance	Simon Holbrook	1,085	24.4	▲2.4
Majority		140	3.1	▼8.0
Registered electors		11,584		
Turnout			38.5	▲1.2
Labour gain from (new seat)		Swing	▼4.0	

=== Heswall ===
Heswall
Party	Candidate	Votes	%	±%
Conservative	P. Wilson	3,928	76.5	▼3.0
Alliance	D. Horton-Smith	903	17.6	▲6.2
Labour	J. Hall	306	6.0	▼3.1
Majority		3,025	58.9	▼9.2
Registered electors		12,856		
Turnout			40.0	▲1.9
Conservative gain from (new seat)		Swing	▼4.6	

=== Hoylake ===
Hoylake
Party	Candidate	Votes	%	±%
Conservative	B. Amyes	3,626	63.1	▼8.5
Alliance	P. Barker	2,118	36.9	▲20.5
Majority		1,508	26.3	▼29.0
Registered electors		12,648		
Turnout			45.4	▲10.3
Conservative gain from (new seat)		Swing	▼14.5	

=== Leasowe ===
Leasowe
Party	Candidate	Votes	%	±%
Labour	John Clark	1,939	53.7	▼15.1
Conservative	E. Sanders	949	26.3	▲3.0
Alliance	B. Thomas	724	20.0	▲12.0
Majority		990	27.4	▼18.1
Registered electors		10,955		
Turnout			33.0	Steady
Labour gain from (new seat)		Swing	▼9.1	

=== Liscard ===
Liscard
Party	Candidate	Votes	%	±%
Conservative	S. Morgan	2,355	48.3	▲2.1
Labour	M. Mannin	1,321	27.1	▼11.1
Alliance	M. Canning	1,198	24.6	▲9.0
Majority		1,034	21.2	▲13.3
Registered electors		12,248		
Turnout			39.8	▲5.1
Conservative gain from (new seat)		Swing	▲6.6	

=== Moreton ===
Moreton
Party	Candidate	Votes	%	±%
Conservative	A. Young	1,749	44.8	▼2.3
Labour	P. Taylor	1,168	29.9	▼14.8
Alliance	J. Richardson	988	25.3	▲17.2
Majority		581	14.9	▲12.5
Registered electors		9,389		
Turnout			41.6	▲13.5
Conservative gain from (new seat)		Swing	▲6.3	

=== New Brighton ===
New Brighton
Party	Candidate	Votes	%	±%
Conservative	Jack Redhead	2,498	56.1	▲2.0
Labour	I. Jackson	1,003	22.5	▼0.8
Alliance	F. Storey	950	21.3	▲1.6
Majority		1,495	33.6	▲2.8
Registered electors		11,731		
Turnout			37.9	▲5.1
Conservative gain from (new seat)		Swing	▲1.4	

=== Oxton ===
Oxton
Party	Candidate	Votes	%	±%
Alliance	Gordon Lindsay	2,627	53.7	▲11.3
Conservative	F. Morton	1,471	30.1	▼5.2
Labour	A. Chape	719	14.7	▼7.6
Ecology	J. Bell	77	1.6	New
Majority		1,156	23.6	▲16.6
Registered electors		11,458		
Turnout			42.7	▲1.4
Alliance gain from (new seat)		Swing	▲8.3	

=== Prenton ===
Prenton
Party	Candidate	Votes	%	±%
Conservative	M. Baker	2,850	48.9	▼10.1
Labour	Vincent McGee	1,772	30.4	▼10.6
Alliance	M. Miller	1,204	20.7	New
Majority		1,078	18.5	▲0.4
Registered electors		12,701		
Turnout			45.9	▲8.1
Conservative gain from (new seat)		Swing	▲0.3	

=== Royden ===
Royden
Party	Candidate	Votes	%	±%
Conservative	W. Lloyd	2,979	65.5	▲0.6
Alliance	A. Colwell	1,570	34.5	▲13.4
Majority		1,409	31.0	▼12.8
Registered electors		11,276		
Turnout			40.3	▲8.5
Conservative gain from (new seat)		Swing	▼6.4	

=== Seacombe ===
Seacombe
Party	Candidate	Votes	%	±%
Labour	A. Cowderoy	2,192	49.2	▼17.8
Alliance	P. Revans	1,177	26.4	▲17.4
Conservative	L. Kennedy	1,088	24.4	▲0.3
Majority		1,015	22.8	▼20.1
Registered electors		12,917		
Turnout			34.5	▲4.7
Labour gain from (new seat)		Swing	▼10.1	

=== Thurstaston ===
Thurstaston
Party	Candidate	Votes	%	±%
Conservative	David Fletcher	3,328	67.3	▼8.8
Alliance	D. Baxter	1,145	23.1	New
Labour	Keith Rimmer	474	9.6	▼14.3
Majority		2,183	44.1	▼8.0
Registered electors		11,957		
Turnout			41.4	▲9.2
Conservative gain from (new seat)		Swing	▼4.0	

=== Tranmere ===
Tranmere
Party	Candidate	Votes	%	±%
Labour	J. Kellett	2,138	59.8	▼6.6
Alliance	Peter Hollingworth	747	20.9	▲12.0
Conservative	P. Entwistle	693	19.4	▼2.1
Majority		1,391	38.9	▼6.0
Registered electors		11,187		
Turnout			32.0	▼0.8
Labour gain from (new seat)		Swing	▼3.0	

=== Upton ===
Upton
Party	Candidate	Votes	%	±%
Labour	Colin Penfold	2,345	44.7	▼13.9
Conservative	D. Bartlett	1,798	34.3	▼7.1
Alliance	Eric Copestake	1,106	21.1	New
Majority		547	10.4	▼6.8
Registered electors		12,506		
Turnout			42.0	▲3.8
Labour gain from (new seat)		Swing	▼3.4	

=== Wallasey ===
Wallasey
Party	Candidate	Votes	%	±%
Conservative	P. Moir	3,663	63.1	▼2.8
Alliance	J. Forbes	1,567	27.0	▲10.8
Labour	C. Bretherton	577	9.9	▼8.0
Majority		2,096	36.1	▼12.0
Registered electors		12,611		
Turnout			46.0	▲2.8
Conservative gain from (new seat)		Swing	▼6.0	

== Notes ==
• italics denote a sitting councillor • bold denotes the winning candidate
