= 1978 Wirral Metropolitan Borough Council election =

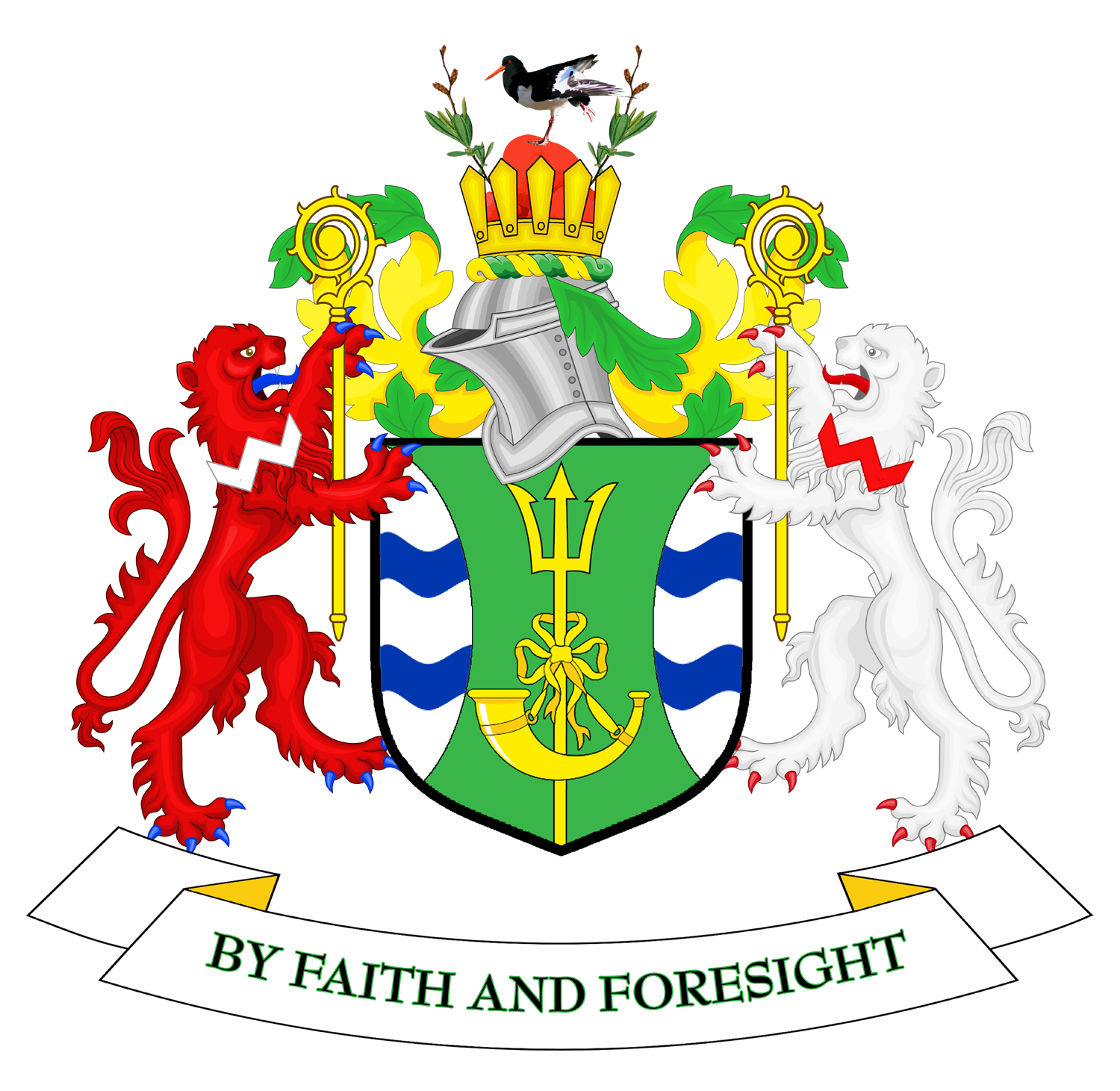
- 4 May 1978

23 of 66 seats (One Third and one by-election) to Wirral Metropolitan Borough Council 34 seats needed for a majority
- Turnout: 35.6% (▼2.2%)
| | First party | Second party | Third party |
|---|---|---|---|
| | Con | Lab | Lib |
| Leader | Harry Deverill | Bill Wells | Gordon Lindsay |
| Party | Conservative | Labour | Liberal |
| Leader's seat | Prenton | Leasowe | Grange and Oxton |
| Last election | 17 seats, 54.3% | 5 seats, 26.9% | 1 seat, 18.4% |
| Seats before | 42 | 18 | 6 |
| Seats won | 14 | 6 | 3 |
| Seats after | 45 | 16 | 5 |
| Seat change | ▲3 | ▼3 | ▼1 |
| Popular vote | 51,523 | 26,246 | 14,231 |
| Percentage | 55.7% | 28.4% | 15.4% |
| Swing | ▲1.4% | ▲1.5% | ▼3.0% |
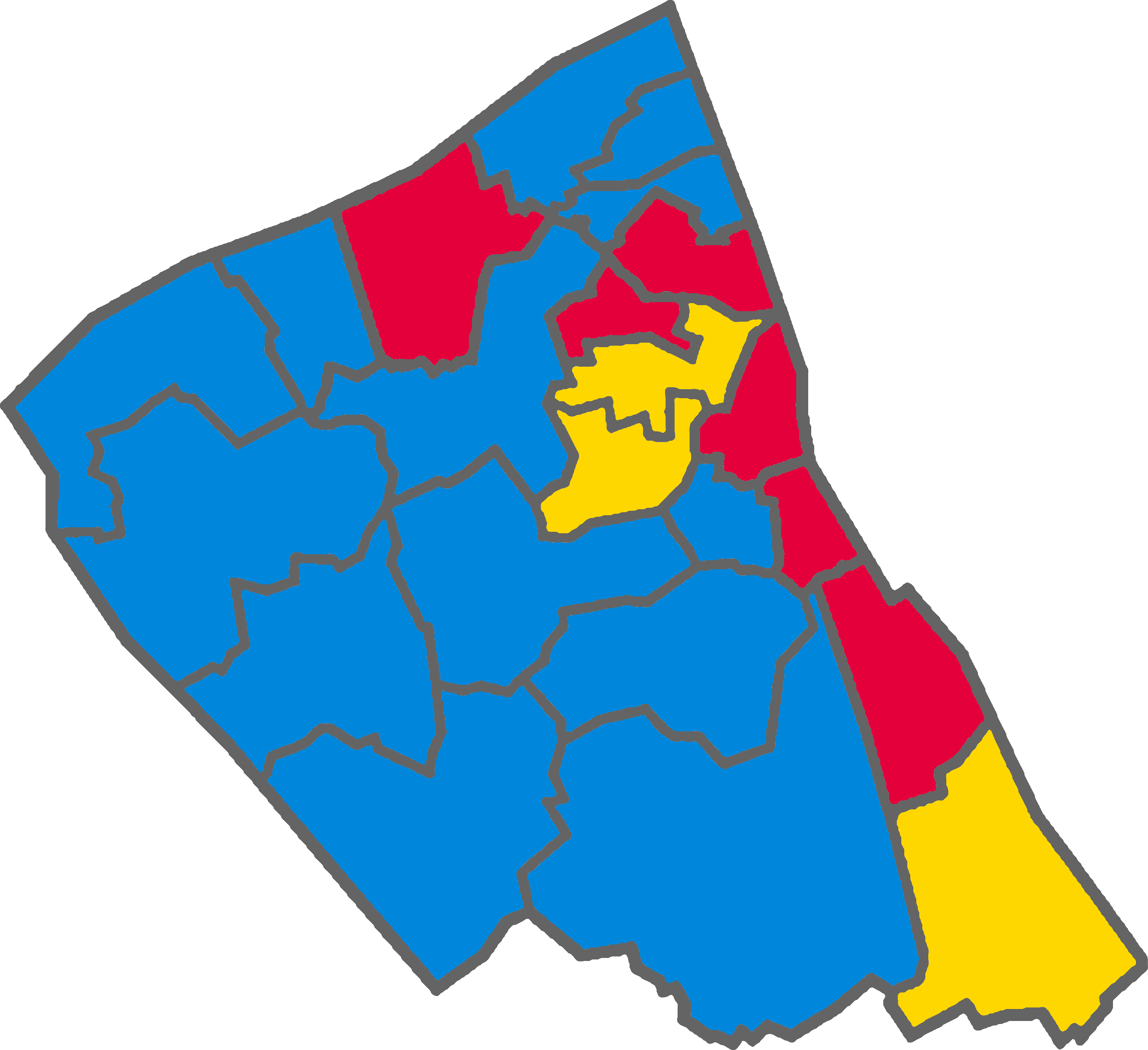
- Map of results of 1978 election
Leader of the Council before election
Harry Deverill
Conservative
Leader of the Council after election
Harry Deverill
Conservative

The 1978 Wirral Metropolitan Borough Council election took place on 4 May 1978 to elect members of Wirral Metropolitan Borough Council in England. This election was held on the same day as other local elections.

After the election, the composition of the council was:

| Party | Seats | ± |
|---|---|---|
| Conservative | 45 | ▲3 |
| Labour | 16 | ▼2 |
| Liberal | 5 | ▼1 |

== Election results ==
=== Overall election result ===
Overall result compared with 1976.

Wirral Metropolitan Borough Council election results, 1978
| Party | Candidates | | | | | | Votes | | |
| Party | Stood | Elected | Gained | Unseated | Net | % of total | % | No. | Net % |
|---|---|---|---|---|---|---|---|---|---|
| Conservative | 23 | 14 | 3 | 0 | ▲3 | 59.1 | 55.7 | 51,523 | ▲1.4 |
| Labour | 23 | 6 | 0 | 2 | ▼2 | 27.3 | 28.4 | 26,246 | ▲1.5 |
| Liberal | 17 | 3 | 1 | 2 | ▼1 | 13.6 | 15.4 | 14,231 | ▼3.0 |
| National Front | 2 | 0 | 0 | 0 | Steady | 0.0 | 0.2 | 209 | N/A |
| Independent | 1 | 0 | 0 | 0 | Steady | 0.0 | 0.2 | 191 | ▲0.2 |
| Communist | 1 | 0 | 0 | 0 | Steady | 0.0 | 0.1 | 59 | ▼0.1 |

(Note: % of total refers to % of wards won.)

== Ward results ==
=== Birkenhead ===
==== No. 1 (Argyle-Clifton-Holt) ====
Argyle-Clifton-Holt
| Party | Candidate | Votes | % | ±% |
|---|---|---|---|---|
| Labour | Richard Kimberly | 1,240 | 52.7 | ▲5.8 |
| Liberal | Anna Blumenthal | 527 | 22.4 | ▼16.9 |
| Conservative | B. Jones | 506 | 21.5 | ▲7.7 |
| National Front | Howard Hawksley | 78 | 3.3 | New |
| Majority | | 713 | 30.3 | ▲22.7 |
| Registered electors | | 7,259 | | |
| Turnout | | | 32.4 | ▼1.6 |
| Labour hold | | Swing | ▲11.4 | |

==== No. 2 (Bebington and Mersey) ====
Bebington and Mersey
| Party | Candidate | Votes | % | ±% |
|---|---|---|---|---|
| Labour | S. Kellett | 1,200 | 48.8 | ▲7.7 |
| Conservative | M. Riley | 1,116 | 45.4 | ▼5.5 |
| Liberal | M. McDonnell | 144 | 5.9 | ▼2.1 |
| Majority | | 84 | 3.4 | N/A |
| Registered electors | | 7,556 | | |
| Turnout | | | 32.6 | ▲2.0 |
| Labour hold | | Swing | ▲6.6 | |

==== No. 3 (Cathcart-Claughton-Cleveland) ====
Cathcart-Claughton-Cleveland
| Party | Candidate | Votes | % | ±% |
|---|---|---|---|---|
| Liberal | Roy Perkins | 1,366 | 38.8 | ▼4.1 |
| Conservative | D. Stoppard | 1,318 | 37.4 | ▲5.1 |
| Labour | Walter Smith | 841 | 23.9 | ▲2.6 |
| Majority | | 48 | 1.4 | ▼9.2 |
| Registered electors | | 8,641 | | |
| Turnout | | | 40.8 | ▲0.2 |
| Liberal hold | | Swing | ▼4.6 | |

==== No. 4 (Devonshire and Egerton) ====
Devonshire and Egerton (2)
| Party | Candidate | Votes | % | ±% |
|---|---|---|---|---|
| Conservative | Myrra Lea (Note: Elected to serve a 4-year term.) | 1,789 | 43.3 | ▼2.2 |
| Conservative | E. Williams (Note: Elected to serve a 2-year term.) | 1,724 | – | – |
| Labour | J. Macdougall | 1,361 | 32.9 | ▲1.3 |
| Labour | R. Leeper | 1,299 | – | – |
| Liberal | G. Quinn | 982 | 23.8 | ▲0.9 |
| Liberal | A. Halliday | 944 | – | – |
| Majority | | 428 | 10.4 | ▼3.5 |
| Registered electors | | 11,925 | | |
| Turnout | | | 34.6 | ▲0.3 |
| Conservative gain from Liberal | | Swing | ▼1.8 | |
| Conservative hold | | Swing | – | |

==== No. 5 (Gilbrook and St James) ====
Gilbrook and St James
| Party | Candidate | Votes | % | ±% |
|---|---|---|---|---|
| Labour | J. Flynn | 1,927 | 72.2 | ▲13.5 |
| Conservative | T. Bird | 493 | 18.5 | ▼2.4 |
| Liberal | D. Murgatroyd | 250 | 9.4 | ▼11.1 |
| Majority | | 1,434 | 53.7 | ▲15.9 |
| Registered electors | | 8,376 | | |
| Turnout | | | 31.9 | ▲0.6 |
| Labour hold | | Swing | ▲8.0 | |

==== No. 6 (Grange and Oxton) ====
Grange and Oxton
| Party | Candidate | Votes | % | ±% |
|---|---|---|---|---|
| Liberal | Gordon Lindsay | 2,564 | 47.7 | ▲14.7 |
| Conservative | R. Hardy | 1,980 | 36.8 | ▼11.8 |
| Labour | Andrew Davies | 833 | 15.5 | ▼2.9 |
| Majority | | 584 | 10.9 | N/A |
| Registered electors | | 13,242 | | |
| Turnout | | | 40.6 | ▲0.7 |
| Liberal hold | | Swing | ▲13.3 | |

==== No. 7 (Prenton) ====
Prenton
| Party | Candidate | Votes | % | ±% |
|---|---|---|---|---|
| Conservative | M. Baker | 2,993 | 65.2 | ▲0.6 |
| Labour | F. Naylor | 1,597 | 34.8 | ▲7.8 |
| Majority | | 1,396 | 30.4 | ▼7.2 |
| Registered electors | | 15,422 | | |
| Turnout | | | 29.7 | ▼3.3 |
| Conservative hold | | Swing | ▼3.6 | |

==== No. 8 (Upton) ====
Upton
| Party | Candidate | Votes | % | ±% |
|---|---|---|---|---|
| Conservative | S. Hibbert | 3,256 | 59.9 | ▲3.0 |
| Labour | J. Seaman | 2,180 | 40.1 | ▼0.5 |
| Majority | | 1,076 | 19.8 | ▲3.5 |
| Registered electors | | 21,661 | | |
| Turnout | | | 25.1 | ▼2.4 |
| Conservative hold | | Swing | ▲1.8 | |

=== Wallasey ===
==== No. 9 (Leasowe) ====
Leasowe
| Party | Candidate | Votes | % | ±% |
|---|---|---|---|---|
| Labour | John Clark | 2,004 | 55.4 | ▲5.2 |
| Conservative | A. Smith | 1,481 | 40.9 | ▲0.8 |
| Liberal | M. Canning | 133 | 3.7 | ▼5.1 |
| Majority | | 523 | 14.5 | ▲4.4 |
| Registered electors | | 11,982 | | |
| Turnout | | | 30.2 | ▼6.1 |
| Labour hold | | Swing | ▲2.2 | |

==== No. 10 (Marlowe-Egremont-South Liscard) ====
Marlowe-Egremont-South-Liscard
| Party | Candidate | Votes | % | ±% |
|---|---|---|---|---|
| Conservative | S. Morgan | 2,404 | 59.6 | ▲4.7 |
| Labour | G. Watkins | 1,379 | 34.2 | ▲4.8 |
| Liberal | S. Pollit | 253 | 6.3 | ▼9.4 |
| Majority | | 1,025 | 25.4 | ▼0.1 |
| Registered electors | | 12,770 | | |
| Turnout | | | 31.6 | ▼2.9 |
| Conservative hold | | Swing | ▼0.1 | |

==== No. 11 (Moreton and Saughall Massie) ====
Moreton and Saughall Massie
| Party | Candidate | Votes | % | ±% |
|---|---|---|---|---|
| Conservative | L. Young | 1,596 | 53.3 | ▼0.5 |
| Labour | Jim Edwards | 1,273 | 42.5 | ▲5.6 |
| Liberal | J. Jenkins | 124 | 4.1 | ▼2.0 |
| Majority | | 323 | 10.8 | ▼6.1 |
| Registered electors | | 8,168 | | |
| Turnout | | | 36.6 | ▼5.7 |
| Conservative gain from Labour | | Swing | ▼3.1 | |

==== No. 12 (New Brighton-Wallasey-Warren) ====
New Brighton-Wallasey-Warren
| Party | Candidate | Votes | % | ±% |
|---|---|---|---|---|
| Conservative | D. Moir | 4,176 | 63.7 | ▲10.6 |
| Liberal | N. Thomas | 1,856 | 28.3 | ▼9.6 |
| Labour | W. Edwards | 525 | 8.0 | ▼1.0 |
| Majority | | 2,320 | 35.4 | ▲20.2 |
| Registered electors | | 14,454 | | |
| Turnout | | | 45.4 | ▲0.6 |
| Conservative gain from Liberal | | Swing | ▲10.1 | |

==== No. 13 (North Liscard-Upper Brighton Street) ====
North Liscard-Upper Brighton Street
| Party | Candidate | Votes | % | ±% |
|---|---|---|---|---|
| Conservative | Jack Redhead | 2,651 | 75.5 | ▲16.8 |
| Labour | B. Lloyd | 591 | 16.8 | ▲0.6 |
| Liberal | J. Barton | 270 | 7.7 | ▼17.3 |
| Majority | | 2,060 | 58.7 | ▲25.0 |
| Registered electors | | 11,546 | | |
| Turnout | | | 30.4 | ▼3.2 |
| Conservative hold | | Swing | ▲12.5 | |

==== No. 14 (Seacombe-Poulton-Somerville) ====
Seacombe-Poulton-Somerville
| Party | Candidate | Votes | % | ±% |
|---|---|---|---|---|
| Labour | Phoebe Bentzien | 2,187 | 58.0 | ▼0.4 |
| Conservative | M. Kemble | 1,248 | 33.1 | ▼3.1 |
| Liberal | P. Mawdsley | 143 | 3.8 | ▼1.7 |
| National Front | John Fishwick | 131 | 3.5 | New |
| Communist | R. Harris | 59 | 1.6 | New |
| Majority | | 939 | 24.9 | ▲2.7 |
| Registered electors | | 11,223 | | |
| Turnout | | | 33.6 | ▲0.2 |
| Labour hold | | Swing | ▲1.4 | |

=== Bebington ===
==== No. 15 (Higher Bebington and Woodhey) ====
Higher Bebington and Woodhey
| Party | Candidate | Votes | % | ±% |
|---|---|---|---|---|
| Conservative | Frank Theaker | 3,285 | 71.2 | ▼4.7 |
| Labour | Audrey Moore | 921 | 20.0 | ▼4.1 |
| Liberal | Penelope Globy | 410 | 8.9 | New |
| Majority | | 2,364 | 51.2 | ▼0.6 |
| Registered electors | | 10,181 | | |
| Turnout | | | 45.3 | ▼4.2 |
| Conservative hold | | Swing | ▼0.3 | |

==== No. 16 (Park-New Ferry-North Bromborough) ====
Park-New Ferry-North Bromborough
| Party | Candidate | Votes | % | ±% |
|---|---|---|---|---|
| Labour | S. Price | 2,082 | 52.2 | ▲4.8 |
| Conservative | T. Stacey | 1,905 | 47.8 | ▲4.0 |
| Majority | | 177 | 4.4 | ▲0.8 |
| Registered electors | | 9,828 | | |
| Turnout | | | 40.6 | ▲2.3 |
| Labour hold | | Swing | ▲0.4 | |

==== No. 17 (South Bromborough and Eastham) ====
South Bromborough and Eastham
| Party | Candidate | Votes | % | ±% |
|---|---|---|---|---|
| Liberal | Phillip Gilchrist | 3,729 | 58.1 | ▲20.1 |
| Conservative | B. Davies | 1,749 | 27.3 | ▼8.7 |
| Labour | R. Dunning | 940 | 14.6 | ▼11.4 |
| Majority | | 1,980 | 30.8 | N/A |
| Registered electors | | 13,985 | | |
| Turnout | | | 45.9 | ▼2.0 |
| Liberal gain from Labour | | Swing | ▲14.4 | |

==== No. 18 (Lower Bebington and Poulton) ====
Lower Bebington and Poulton
| Party | Candidate | Votes | % | ±% |
|---|---|---|---|---|
| Conservative | J. Zowe | 3,630 | 65.3 | ▼5.8 |
| Labour | R. Woods | 1,015 | 18.2 | ▼0.5 |
| Liberal | Thomas Harney | 918 | 16.5 | ▲6.3 |
| Majority | | 2,615 | 47.1 | ▼5.3 |
| Registered electors | | 14,163 | | |
| Turnout | | | 39.3 | ▼6.5 |
| Conservative hold | | Swing | ▼2.7 | |

=== Hoylake ===
==== No. 19 (Caldy and Frankby) ====
Caldy and Frankby
| Party | Candidate | Votes | % | ±% |
|---|---|---|---|---|
| Conservative | W. Lloyd | 3,523 | 74.5 | ▲2.2 |
| Liberal | B. Crosby | 562 | 11.9 | ▼5.0 |
| Labour | John McCabe | 454 | 9.6 | ▼1.2 |
| Independent | J. Ellison | 191 | 4.0 | New |
| Majority | | 2,961 | 62.6 | ▲7.2 |
| Registered electors | | 13,589 | | |
| Turnout | | | 34.8 | ▼3.4 |
| Conservative hold | | Swing | ▲3.6 | |

==== No. 20 (Central-Hoose-Meols-Park) ====
Central-Hoose-Meols-Park
| Party | Candidate | Votes | % | ±% |
|---|---|---|---|---|
| Conservative | William Whitehurst | 4,051 | 86.0 | ▲16.2 |
| Labour | David Jackson | 660 | 14.0 | ▲7.2 |
| Majority | | 3,391 | 72.0 | ▲25.6 |
| Registered electors | | 12,150 | | |
| Turnout | | | 38.8 | ▼5.5 |
| Conservative hold | | Swing | ▲12.8 | |

=== Wirral ===
==== No. 21 (Barnston-Gayton-Heswall-Oldfield) ====
Barnston-Gayton-Heswall-Oldfield
| Party | Candidate | Votes | % | ±% |
|---|---|---|---|---|
| Conservative | P. Wilson | 3,859 | 91.1 | ▲5.8 |
| Labour | P. Wallace | 375 | 8.9 | ▲4.5 |
| Majority | | 3,484 | 82.2 | ▲7.2 |
| Registered electors | | 11,581 | | |
| Turnout | | | 36.6 | ▼6.8 |
| Conservative hold | | Swing | ▲3.6 | |

==== No. 22 (Irby-Pensby-Thurstaston) ====
Irby-Pensby-Thurstaston
| Party | Candidate | Votes | % | ±% |
|---|---|---|---|---|
| Conservative | David Fletcher | 2,514 | 79.2 | ▲14.1 |
| Labour | H. Ellis-Thomas | 661 | 20.8 | ▲2.9 |
| Majority | | 1,853 | 58.4 | ▲11.2 |
| Registered electors | | 10,048 | | |
| Turnout | | | 31.6 | ▼6.7 |
| Conservative hold | | Swing | ▲5.6 | |

== Notes ==
• italics denote the sitting councillor • bold denotes the winning candidate
