= West Kirby and Thurstaston (ward) =

Electoral ward of Wirral, England

West Kirby and Thurstaston (previously Irby-Pensby-Thurstaston, 1973 to 1979, and Thurstaston, 1979 to 2004) is a Wirral Metropolitan Borough Council ward in the Wirral West Parliamentary constituency.

== Councillors ==
Election	Councillor (Party)	Councillor (Party)	Councillor (Party)	Ref.
1973	Doris Sisson (Conservative)	Birks (Conservative)	Ford (Conservative)	
1975	Doris Sisson (Conservative)	Birks (Conservative)	W. Leigh (Conservative)	
1976	Doris Sisson (Conservative)	A. Jones (Conservative)	W. Leigh (Conservative)	
1978	David Fletcher (Conservative)	A. Jones (Conservative)	W. Leigh (Conservative)	
1979	David Fletcher (Conservative)	A. Jones (Conservative)	W. Leigh (Conservative)	
1980	David Fletcher (Conservative)	Sid Dunn (Conservative)	W. Leigh (Conservative)	
1982	David Fletcher (Conservative)	Sid Dunn (Conservative)	W. Leigh (Conservative)	
1983	David Fletcher (Conservative)	Sid Dunn (Conservative)	Don McCubbin (Conservative)	
1984	David Fletcher (Conservative)	Sid Dunn (Conservative)	Don McCubbin (Conservative)	
1986	David Fletcher (Conservative)	Sid Dunn (Conservative)	Jeff Green (Conservative)	
1987	David Fletcher (Conservative)	Sid Dunn (Conservative)	Jeff Green (Conservative)	
1988	David Fletcher (Conservative)	Sid Dunn (Conservative)	Jeff Green (Conservative)	
1990	David Fletcher (Conservative)	Sid Dunn (Conservative)	Jeff Green (Conservative)	
1991	David Fletcher (Conservative)	Sid Dunn (Conservative)	Jeff Green (Conservative)	
1992	David Fletcher (Conservative)	Sid Dunn (Conservative)	Jeff Green (Conservative)	
1994	Mark Hughes (Conservative)	Sid Dunn (Conservative)	Jeff Green (Conservative)	
1995	Mark Hughes (Conservative)	Sid Dunn (Conservative)	Jeff Green (Conservative)	
1996	Mark Hughes (Conservative)	Sid Dunn (Conservative)	Jeff Green (Conservative)	
1998	Jacquie McKelvie (Conservative)	Sid Dunn (Conservative)	Jeff Green (Conservative)	
1999	Jacquie McKelvie (Conservative)	Sid Dunn (Conservative)	Jeff Green (Conservative)	
2000	Jacquie McKelvie (Conservative)	David Elderton (Conservative)	Jeff Green (Conservative)	
2002	Jacquie McKelvie (Conservative)	David Elderton (Conservative)	Jeff Green (Conservative)	
2003	Jacquie McKelvie (Conservative)	David Elderton (Conservative)	Jeff Green (Conservative)	
2004	Geoffrey Watt (Conservative)	David Elderton (Conservative)	Jeff Green (Conservative)	
2006	Geoffrey Watt (Conservative)	David Elderton (Conservative)	Jeff Green (Conservative)	
2007	Geoffrey Watt (Conservative)	David Elderton (Conservative)	Jeff Green (Conservative)	
2008	Geoffrey Watt (Conservative)	David Elderton (Conservative)	Jeff Green (Conservative)	
2010	Geoffrey Watt (Conservative)	David Elderton (Conservative)	Jeff Green (Conservative)	
2011	Geoffrey Watt (Conservative)	David Elderton (Conservative)	Jeff Green (Conservative)	
2012	Geoffrey Watt (Conservative)	David Elderton (Conservative)	Jeff Green (Conservative)	
2014	Geoffrey Watt (Conservative)	David Elderton (Conservative)	Jeff Green (Conservative)	
2015	Geoffrey Watt (Conservative)	David Elderton (Conservative)	Jeff Green (Conservative)	
2016	Geoffrey Watt (Conservative)	David Elderton (Conservative)	Jeff Green (Conservative)	
2018	Geoffrey Watt (Conservative)	David Elderton (Conservative)	Jeff Green (Conservative)	
2019	Geoffrey Watt (Conservative)	Jenny Johnson (Conservative)	Jeff Green (Conservative)	
2021	Simon Mountney (Conservative)	Jenny Johnson (Conservative)	Jeff Green (Conservative)	
2022	Simon Mountney (Conservative)	Jenny Johnson (Conservative)	Jeff Green (Conservative)	
