= 2002 Wirral Metropolitan Borough Council election =

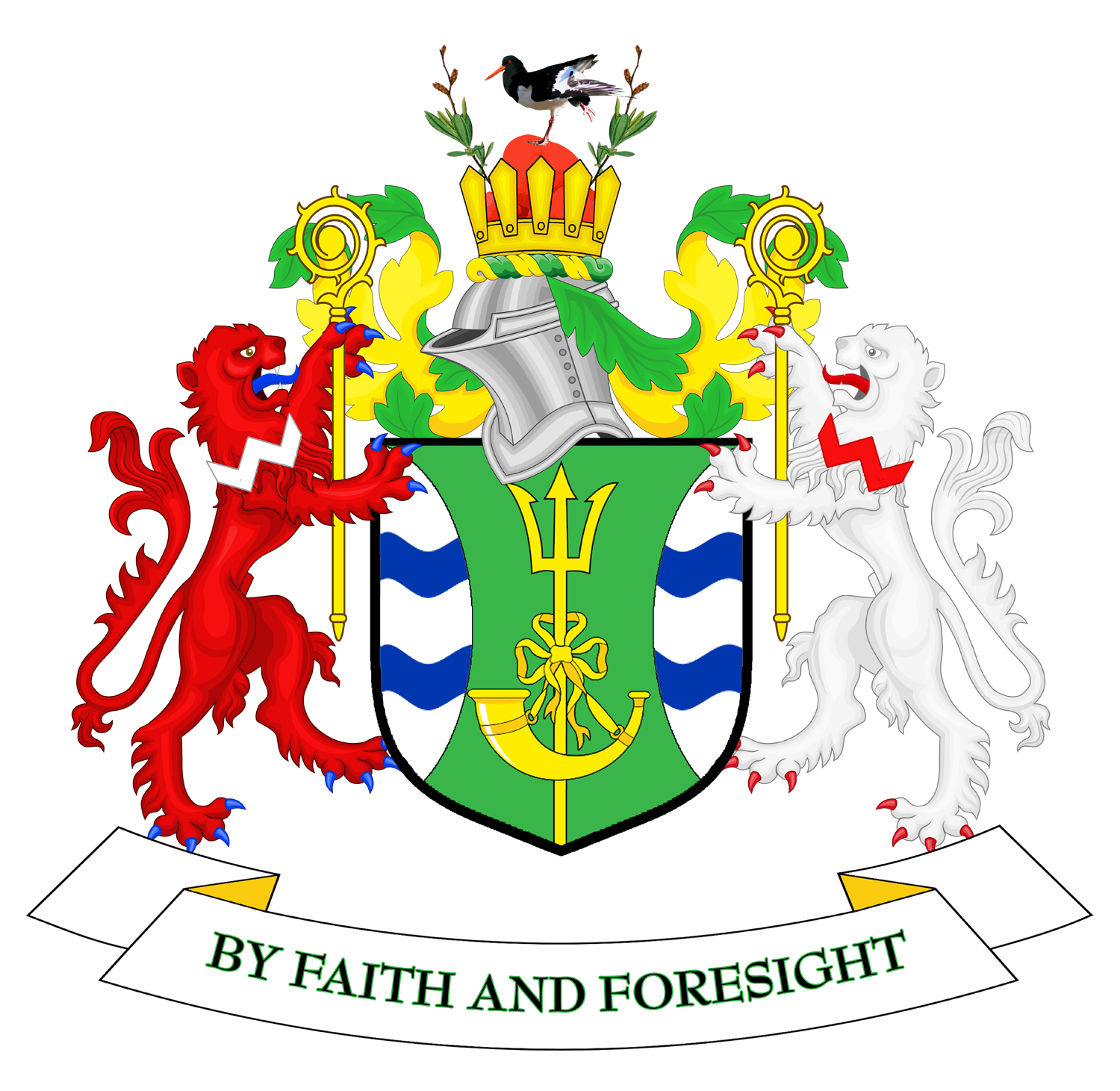
- 2 May 2002

22 of 66 seats (One Third) to Wirral Metropolitan Borough Council 34 seats needed for a majority
- Turnout: 31.8% (▲4.7%)
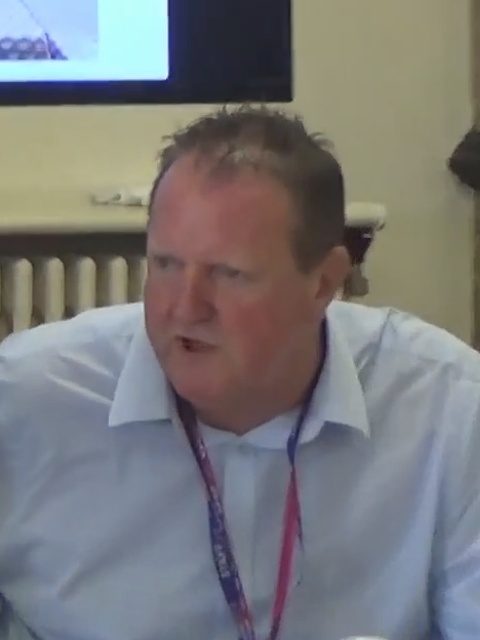

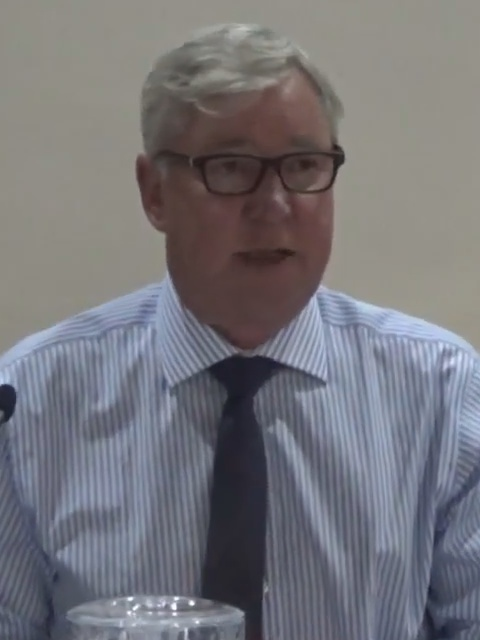

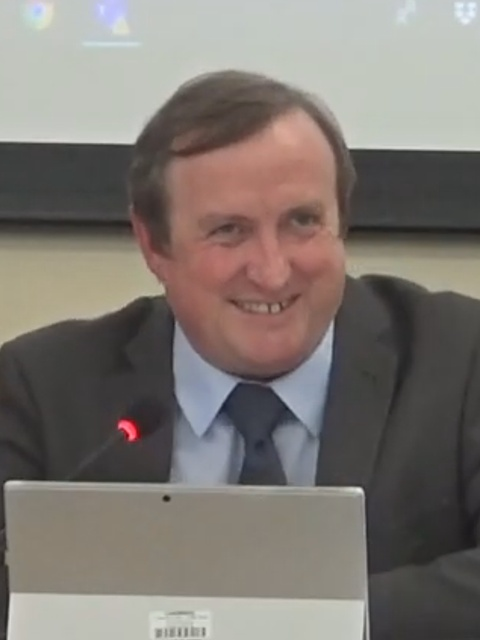
	First party	Second party	Third party
Leader	Steve Foulkes	Jeff Green	Stuart Kelly
Party	Labour	Conservative	Liberal Democrats
Leader's seat	Claughton	Thurstaston	Oxton
Last election	8 seats, 30.7%	9 seats, 40.7%	5 seats, 25.8%
Seats before	32	20	12
Seats won	11	6	5
Seats after	31	20	14
Seat change	▼1	Steady	▲2
Popular vote	28,747	27,887	20,738
Percentage	36.4%	35.3%	26.2%
Swing	▲5.7%	▼5.4%	▲0.4%
- Map of results of 2002 election
Leader of the Council before election
Steve Foulkes (Labour)
No Overall Control
Leader of the Council after election
Steve Foulkes (Labour)
No Overall Control

The 2002 Wirral Metropolitan Borough Council election took place on 2 May 2002 to elect members of Wirral Metropolitan Borough Council in England. This election was held on the same day as other local elections.

After the election, the composition of the council was:

Party	Seats	±
Labour	31	▼1
Conservative	20	Steady
Liberal Democrats	14	▲2
Independent	1	▼1

== Election results ==
=== Overall election result ===
Overall result compared with 2000.

Wirral Metropolitan Borough Council election results, 2002
Party	Candidates						Votes		
Party	Stood	Elected	Gained	Unseated	Net	% of total	%	No.	Net %
Labour	22	11	1	2	▼1	50.0	36.4	28,747	▲5.7
Conservative	22	6	1	1	Steady	27.3	35.3	27,887	▼5.4
Liberal Democrats	22	5	2	0	▲2	22.7	26.2	20,738	▲0.4
Green	11	0	0	0	Steady	0.0	1.8	1,453	▼1.0
Independent	1	0	0	1	▼1	0.0	0.2	181	N/A

== Ward results ==
=== Bebington ===
Bebington
Party	Candidate	Votes	%	±%
Labour	Denise Realey	1,884	46.7	▲5.3
Conservative	Patricia Jones	1,478	36.7	▼9.0
Liberal Democrats	Kevin Turner	493	12.2	▲2.2
Green	Michael Harper	175	4.3	▲1.4
Majority		406	10.1	N/A
Registered electors		10,775		
Turnout			37.4	▲3.1
Labour gain from Independent		Swing	▲7.2	

=== Bidston ===
Bidston
Party	Candidate	Votes	%	±%
Labour	Bill Nock	1,119	73.7	▲0.4
Independent	Kathryn Shaughnessy (Note: Incumbent councillor for Bebington ward.)	181	11.9	New
Liberal Democrats	John Tomlinson	110	7.2	▼3.3
Conservative	David May	108	7.1	▼6.1
Majority		938	61.8	▲1.7
Registered electors		7,176		
Turnout			21.2	▲7.4
Labour hold		Swing	▲0.9	

=== Birkenhead ===
Birkenhead
Party	Candidate	Votes	%	±%
Labour	David Christian	1,481	80.4	▲9.1
Liberal Democrats	Ronald Williams	234	12.7	▲1.7
Conservative	Barbara Poole	126	6.8	▼5.0
Majority		1,247	67.7	▲8.3
Registered electors		9,975		
Turnout			18.5	▲3.1
Labour hold		Swing	▲4.1	

=== Bromborough ===
Bromborough
Party	Candidate	Votes	%	±%
Liberal Democrats	Stephen Niblock	2,047	56.1	▲10.1
Labour	Audrey Moore	1,183	32.4	▼3.3
Conservative	Kathryn Hodson	349	9.6	▼6.1
Green	Perle Sheldricks	72	2.0	▼0.6
Majority		864	23.7	▲13.4
Registered electors		11,117		
Turnout			32.8	▲4.9
Liberal Democrats gain from Labour		Swing	▲6.7	

=== Clatterbridge ===
Clatterbridge
Party	Candidate	Votes	%	±%
Liberal Democrats	Alan Jennings	3,019	51.0	▲14.0
Conservative	Brian Cummings	1,770	29.9	▼11.9
Labour	Joseph Walsh	1,023	17.3	▼1.9
Green	Ann Jones	106	1.8	▼0.3
Majority		1,249	21.1	N/A
Registered electors		13,941		
Turnout			42.5	▲6.3
Liberal Democrats gain from Conservative		Swing	▲13.0	

=== Claughton ===
Claughton
Party	Candidate	Votes	%	±%
Labour	Stephen Foulkes	1,775	56.2	▲2.3
Conservative	Brian Stewart	704	22.3	▼3.2
Liberal Democrats	Francis Doyle	561	17.8	▲1.3
Green	Joyce Hogg	119	3.8	▼0.2
Majority		1,071	33.9	▲5.5
Registered electors		11,475		
Turnout			27.5	▲5.2
Labour hold		Swing	▲2.8	

=== Eastham ===
Eastham
Party	Candidate	Votes	%	±%
Liberal Democrats	Thomas Harney	2,743	69.7	▲1.8
Labour	June Williams	719	18.3	▲3.4
Conservative	Marcus Darby	376	9.6	▼6.4
Green	Brian Gibbs	95	2.4	▲1.3
Majority		2,024	51.5	▼0.4
Registered electors		11,235		
Turnout			35.0	▲2.7
Liberal Democrats hold		Swing	▼0.3	

=== Egerton ===
Egerton
Party	Candidate	Votes	%	±%
Labour	Jerry Williams	1,652	65.5	▲10.5
Conservative	Cyrus Ferguson	415	16.5	▼7.1
Liberal Democrats	Philip Lloyd	315	12.5	▼2.1
Green	Catherine Page	140	5.6	▼1.2
Majority		1,237	49.0	▲17.5
Registered electors		10,826		
Turnout			23.3	▲5.1
Labour hold		Swing	▲8.8	

=== Heswall ===
Heswall
Party	Candidate	Votes	%	±%
Conservative	Andrew Hodson	3,010	64.3	▼7.5
Labour	John McElnay	747	16.0	▲2.1
Liberal Democrats	Christopher Jackson	703	15.0	▲3.8
Green	Cecil Bowler	222	4.7	▲1.6
Majority		2,263	48.3	▼9.7
Registered electors		13,494		
Turnout			34.7	▲3.8
Conservative hold		Swing	▼4.8	

=== Hoylake ===
Hoylake
Party	Candidate	Votes	%	±%
Conservative	Gerry Ellis	3,100	65.6	▼2.8
Labour	Ron Johnston	1,003	21.2	▲6.7
Liberal Democrats	Robert Wilkins	620	13.1	▲1.1
Majority		2,097	44.4	▼9.4
Registered electors		12,848		
Turnout			36.8	▲5.7
Conservative hold		Swing	▼4.8	

=== Leasowe ===
Leasowe
Party	Candidate	Votes	%	±%
Labour	Iris Coates	1,436	58.1	▲1.5
Conservative	Vida Wilson	808	32.7	▲6.3
Liberal Democrats	Susan Uriel	227	9.2	▼7.8
Majority		628	25.4	▼4.8
Registered electors		9,797		
Turnout			25.2	▲7.6
Labour hold		Swing	▼2.4	

=== Liscard ===
Liscard
Party	Candidate	Votes	%	±%
Labour	David Hawkins	1,569	48.5	▲9.7
Conservative	Leah Fraser	1,335	41.3	▼4.5
Liberal Democrats	Neil Thomas	328	10.1	▼1.4
Majority		234	7.2	N/A
Registered electors		11,127		
Turnout			29.0	▲5.7
Labour hold		Swing	▲7.1	

=== Moreton ===
Moreton
Party	Candidate	Votes	%	±%
Conservative	Leslie Spencer	1,622	47.7	▼8.2
Labour	Ann McLachlan	1,465	43.1	▲7.7
Liberal Democrats	Eric Copestake	316	9.3	▲0.6
Majority		157	4.6	▼15.8
Registered electors		9,971		
Turnout			34.1	▲5.0
Conservative gain from Labour		Swing	▼8.0	

=== New Brighton ===
New Brighton
Party	Candidate	Votes	%	±%
Labour	Patrick Hackett	1,692	47.1	▲11.2
Conservative	John Laing	1,475	41.0	▼10.4
Liberal Democrats	John Codling	427	11.9	▲2.9
Majority		217	6.0	N/A
Registered electors		11,736		
Turnout			30.6	▲5.3
Labour hold		Swing	▲10.8	

=== Oxton ===
Oxton
Party	Candidate	Votes	%	±%
Liberal Democrats	Stuart Kelly	1,810	54.7	▼2.1
Labour	Mary Smith	785	23.7	▲5.5
Conservative	Leonard Moore	590	17.8	▼3.1
Green	Percy Hogg	124	3.7	▼0.4
Majority		1,025	31.0	▼4.9
Registered electors		11,677		
Turnout			28.3	▲2.6
Liberal Democrats hold		Swing	▼2.5	

=== Prenton ===
Prenton
Party	Candidate	Votes	%	±%
Liberal Democrats	John Thornton	2,153	53.4	▼2.1
Labour	Gerard Allen	1,001	24.8	▲6.5
Conservative	Ian McKellar	879	21.8	▼2.5
Majority		1,152	28.6	▼2.6
Registered electors		11,596		
Turnout			34.8	▲5.0
Liberal Democrats hold		Swing	▼1.3	

=== Royden ===
Royden
Party	Candidate	Votes	%	±%
Conservative	Laurence Jones	2,405	42.8	▲0.5
Liberal Democrats	Gillian Gardiner	2,350	41.8	▼6.3
Labour	Dennis Woods	762	13.6	▲5.5
Green	Garnette Bowler	102	1.8	▲0.3
Majority		55	1.0	N/A
Registered electors		13,006		
Turnout			43.2	▲2.9
Conservative hold		Swing	▲3.4	

=== Seacombe ===
Seacombe
Party	Candidate	Votes	%	±%
Labour	John Salter	1,630	66.1	▲10.7
Liberal Democrats	Richard Ellett	574	23.3	▼7.7
Conservative	David Hearn	263	10.7	▼1.9
Majority		1,056	42.8	▲18.4
Registered electors		10,843		
Turnout			22.8	▼1.9
Labour hold		Swing	▲9.2	

=== Thurstaston ===
Thurstaston
Party	Candidate	Votes	%	±%
Conservative	Jacqueline McKelvie	2,552	55.6	▼8.4
Labour	David Kean	1,278	27.8	▲5.9
Liberal Democrats	Charles Wall	568	12.4	▲2.0
Green	Shirley Johnson	193	4.2	▲0.5
Majority		1,274	27.7	▼14.5
Registered electors		12,744		
Turnout			36.0	▲4.9
Conservative hold		Swing	▼7.2	

=== Tranmere ===
Tranmere
Party	Candidate	Votes	%	±%
Labour	William Davies	1,250	74.7	▲6.2
Liberal Democrats	Stephen Blaylock	169	10.1	▲0.4
Conservative	Peter Hartley	150	9.0	▼6.6
Green	Stuart Harvey	105	6.3	▲0.2
Majority		1,081	64.6	▲11.8
Registered electors		8,785		
Turnout			19.1	▲4.6
Labour hold		Swing	▲5.9	

=== Upton ===
Upton
Party	Candidate	Votes	%	±%
Labour	John George	2,041	51.1	▲1.2
Conservative	David Stitcher	1,508	37.8	▲1.9
Liberal Democrats	Christopher Beazer	444	11.1	▲0.5
Majority		533	13.3	▼0.7
Registered electors		12,341		
Turnout			32.4	▲8.7
Labour hold		Swing	▼0.3	

=== Wallasey ===
Wallasey
Party	Candidate	Votes	%	±%
Conservative	Lesley Rennie	2,864	61.7	▼10.3
Labour	Alexander Nuttall	1,252	27.0	▲8.9
Liberal Democrats	John Uriel	527	11.4	▲1.5
Majority		1,612	34.7	▼19.2
Registered electors		12,281		
Turnout			37.8	▲5.6
Conservative hold		Swing	▼9.6	

== Changes between 2000 and 2002 ==
=== Prenton by-election 2003 ===
By-election, 6 February 2003: Prenton
Party	Candidate	Votes	%	±%
Liberal Democrats	Francis Doyle	1,764	63.3	▲9.9
Conservative	Ian McKellar	634	22.7	▲0.9
Labour	Gerard Allen	389	14.0	▼10.8
Majority		1,130	40.6	▲12.0
Registered electors		11,596		
Turnout			24.0	▼10.8
Liberal Democrats hold		Swing	▲6.0	

== Notes ==
• italics denote the sitting councillor • bold denotes the winning candidate
