= 1975 Wirral Metropolitan Borough Council election =

1975 local election in England

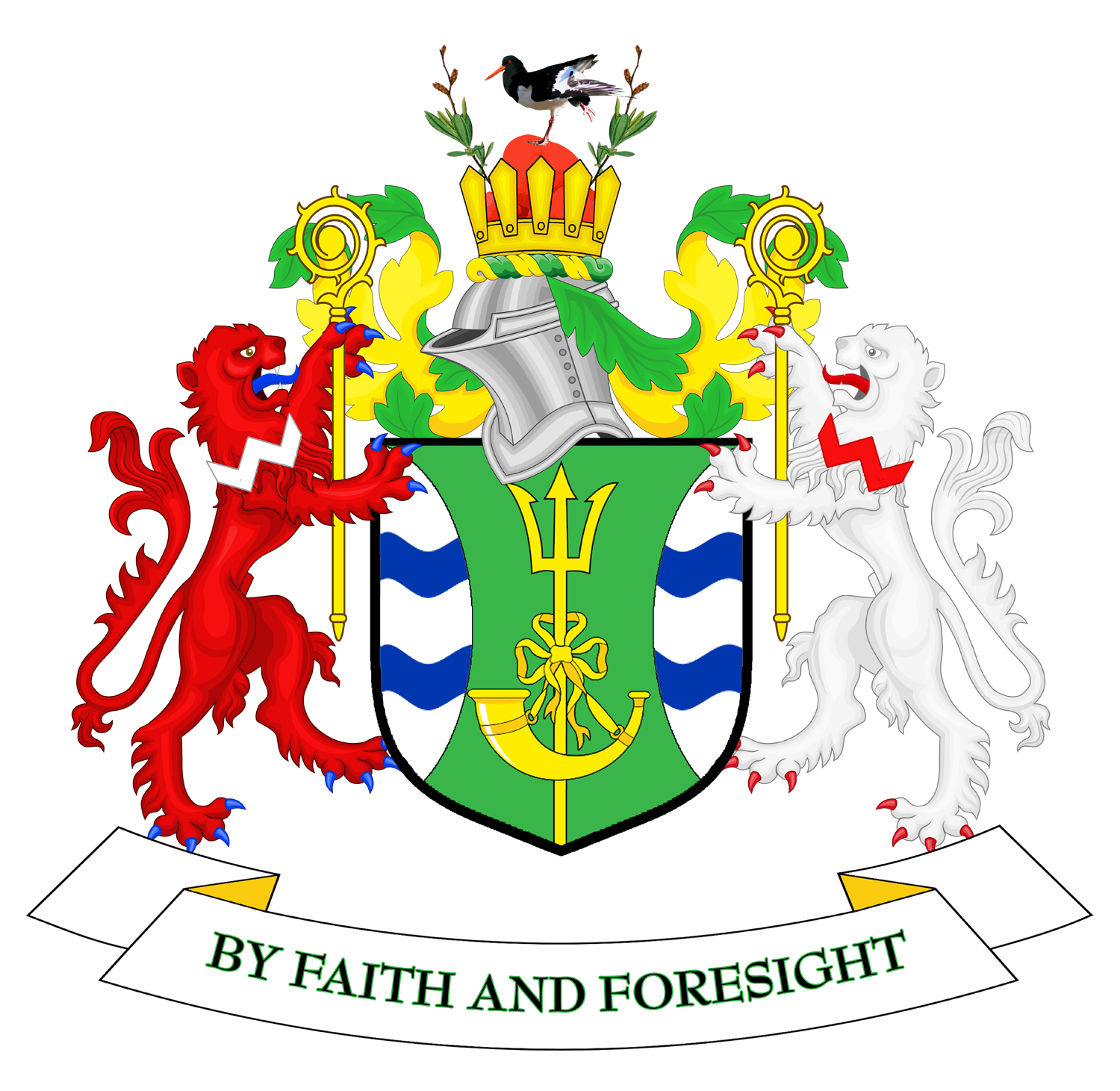
- 1 May 1975

22 of 66 seats (One Third) to Wirral Metropolitan Borough Council 34 seats needed for a majority
- Turnout: 36.7% (▼4.4%)
	First party	Second party	Third party
	Con	Lab
Leader	Malcolm Thornton	Bill Wells	Gruff Evans
Party	Conservative	Labour	Liberal
Leader's seat	North Liscard-Upper Brighton Street	Leasowe	Cathcart-Claughton-Cleveland
Last election	29 seats, 42.9%	24 seats, 32.6%	13 seats, 22.6%
Seats before	29	24	13
Seats won	16	5	1
Seats after	36	21	9
Seat change	▲7	▼3	▼3
Popular vote	51,547	23,603	18,570
Percentage	54.7%	25.0%	19.7%
Swing	▲11.8%	▼7.6%	▼2.9%
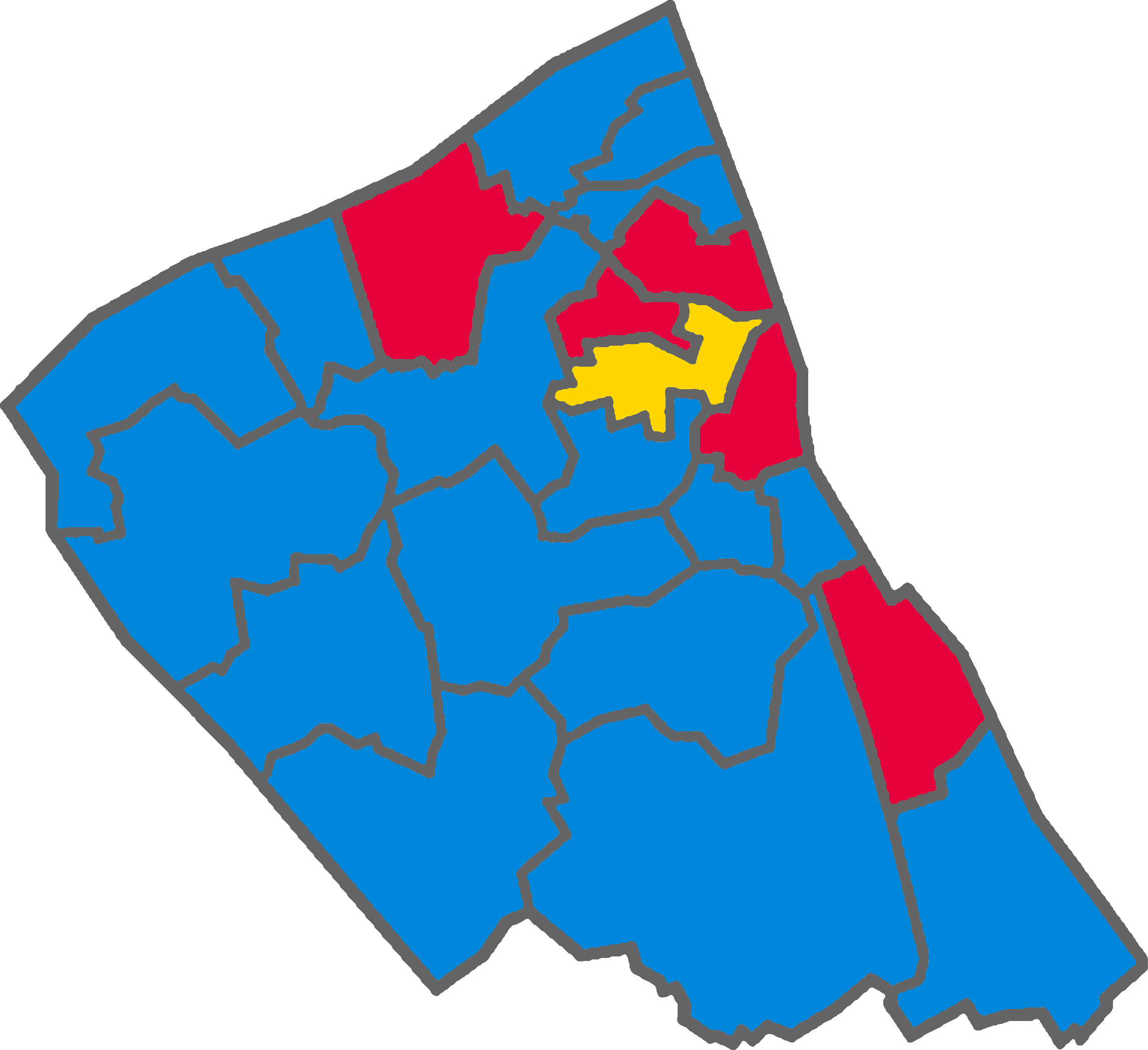
- Map of results of 1975 election
Leader of the Council before election
Malcolm Thornton (Conservative)
No Overall Control
Leader of the Council after election
Malcolm Thornton
Conservative

The 1975 Wirral Metropolitan Borough Council election took place on 1 May 1975 to elect members of Wirral Metropolitan Borough Council in England. This election was held on the same day as other local elections.

After the election, the composition of the council was:

Party	Seats	±
Conservative	36	▲7
Labour	21	▼3
Liberal	9	▼4

== Election results ==
=== Overall election result ===
Overall result compared with 1973.

Wirral Metropolitan Borough Council election results, 1975
Party	Candidates						Votes		
Party	Stood	Elected	Gained	Unseated	Net	% of total	%	No.	Net %
Conservative	22	16	7	0	▲7	72.7	54.7	51,547	▲11.8
Labour	21	5	0	3	▼3	22.7	25.0	23,603	▼7.6
Liberal	19	1	0	4	▼4	4.5	19.7	18,570	▼2.9
National Front	1	0	0	0	Steady	0.0	0.3	249	N/A
Communist	1	0	0	0	Steady	0.0	0.2	200	Steady
Independent	1	0	0	0	Steady	0.0	0.1	107	N/A

== Ward results ==
Results compared directly with the last local election in 1973.

=== Birkenhead ===
==== No. 1 (Argyle-Clifton-Holt) ====
Argyle-Clifton-Holt
Party	Candidate	Votes	%	±%
Labour	Arthur Smith	1,096	44.6	▼28.2
Liberal	D. Boxer	954	38.8	New
Conservative	L. Peers	410	16.7	▼10.5
Majority		142	5.8	▼39.8
Registered electors		8,590		
Turnout			28.6	▲4.5
Labour hold		Swing	▼19.9	

==== No. 2 (Bebington and Mersey) ====
Bebington and Mersey
Party	Candidate	Votes	%	±%
Conservative	L. Welsh	1,108	44.8	▲7.1
Labour	A. Price	944	38.1	▼6.6
Liberal	G. Quinn	423	17.1	▼0.5
Majority		164	6.7	N/A
Registered electors		7,958		
Turnout			31.1	▼3.8
Conservative gain from Labour		Swing	▲6.9	

==== No. 3 (Cathcart-Claughton-Cleveland) ====
Cathcart-Claughton-Cleveland
Party	Candidate	Votes	%	±%
Liberal	A. Jones	1,641	43.3	▼10.5
Conservative	R. Stretch	1,172	30.9	▲7.4
Labour	Walter Smith	979	25.8	▲3.0
Majority		469	12.4	▼17.9
Registered electors		9,882		
Turnout			38.4	▼7.1
Liberal hold		Swing	▼9.0	

==== No. 4 (Devonshire and Egerton) ====
Devonshire and Egerton
Party	Candidate	Votes	%	±%
Conservative	K. Allen	1,644	38.2	▲7.4
Liberal	Roy Perkins	1,603	37.3	▼5.0
Labour	J. MacDougall	1,052	24.5	▼2.4
Majority		41	0.9	N/A
Registered electors		12,378		
Turnout			34.7	▼6.8
Conservative gain from Liberal		Swing	▲6.2	

==== No. 5 (Gilbrook and St James) ====
Gilbrook and St James
Party	Candidate	Votes	%	±%
Labour	P. Roberts	1,369	57.1	▼2.8
Liberal	K. Henron	531	22.2	▼8.4
Conservative	H. Kirkby	496	20.7	▲11.2
Majority		838	34.9	▲5.6
Registered electors		8,654		
Turnout			27.7	▼10.1
Labour hold		Swing	▲2.8	

==== No. 6 (Grange and Oxton) ====
Grange and Oxton
Party	Candidate	Votes	%	±%
Conservative	R. Hodkinson	2,293	50.1	▲17.1
Liberal	G. Edwards	1,520	33.2	▼17.3
Labour	A. Jones	764	16.7	▲0.2
Majority		773	16.9	N/A
Registered electors		12,602		
Turnout			36.3	▼6.2
Conservative gain from Liberal		Swing	▲17.2	

==== No. 7 (Prenton) ====
Prenton
Party	Candidate	Votes	%	±%
Conservative	George Porter	3,088	55.3	▲3.6
Labour	J. Pennington	1,504	26.9	▼15.6
Liberal	J. Edwards	997	17.8	New
Majority		1,584	28.4	▲19.2
Registered electors		15,605		
Turnout			35.8	▲1.2
Conservative hold		Swing	▲9.6	

==== No. 8 (Upton) ====
Upton
Party	Candidate	Votes	%	±%
Conservative	J. Roberts	3,134	55.3	▲8.7
Labour	Bernard Gilfoyle	1,885	33.3	▼11.0
Liberal	S. Gayford	448	7.9	New
Communist	G. Hughes	200	3.5	▲0.3
Majority		1,249	22.0	▲20.1
Registered electors		20,752		
Turnout			27.3	▼1.8
Conservative hold		Swing	▲10.1	

=== Wallasey ===
==== No. 9 (Leasowe) ====
Leasowe
Party	Candidate	Votes	%	±%
Labour	Ken Fox	1,590	51.6	▼18.8
Conservative	J. Merrill	1,383	44.9	▲15.3
Independent	G. Smith	107	3.5	New
Majority		207	6.7	▼34.1
Registered electors		11,733		
Turnout			26.3	▼0.1
Labour hold		Swing	▼17.1	

==== No. 10 (Marlowe-Egremont-South Liscard) ====
Marlowe-Egremont-South Liscard
Party	Candidate	Votes	%	±%
Conservative	John Hale	3,090	67.9	▲24.3
Labour	Vincent McGee	1,458	32.1	▼9.1
Majority		1,632	35.8	▲33.4
Registered electors		13,083		
Turnout			34.8	▼2.6
Conservative hold		Swing	▲16.7	

==== No. 11 (Moreton and Saughall Massie) ====
Moreton and Saughall Massie
Party	Candidate	Votes	%	±%
Conservative	David Williams	1,552	60.9	▲20.4
Labour	E. Lewis	998	39.1	▼8.1
Majority		554	21.8	N/A
Registered electors		7,057		
Turnout			36.1	▼3.4
Conservative gain from Labour		Swing	▲14.3	

==== No. 12 (New Brighton-Wallasey-Warren) ====
New Brighton-Wallasey-Warren
Party	Candidate	Votes	%	±%
Conservative	R. Ievers	4,394	62.9	▲23.0
Liberal	J. Southworth	1,792	25.6	▼18.5
Labour	M. Hirons	553	7.9	▲1.9
National Front	John Fishwick (Note: Stood as an Ind. Conservative in 1973. Results compared.)	249	3.6	▼6.4
Majority		2,602	37.3	N/A
Registered electors		14,888		
Turnout			46.9	▲7.4
Conservative gain from Liberal		Swing	▲20.8	

==== No. 13 (North Liscard-Upper Brighton Street) ====
North Liscard-Upper Brighton Street
Party	Candidate	Votes	%	±%
Conservative	George Thornton	2,909	70.2	▲28.3
Labour	M. Laskier	622	15.0	▼0.5
Liberal	R. Edge	611	14.8	▼19.6
Majority		2,287	55.2	▲47.7
Registered electors		11,640		
Turnout			35.6	▼3.9
Conservative hold		Swing	▲23.9	

==== No. 14 (Seacombe-Poulton-Somerville) ====
Seacombe-Poulton-Somerville
Party	Candidate	Votes	%	±%
Labour	S. Wickham	1,618	50.0	▼15.8
Conservative	R. Atkinson	1,408	43.5	▲17.6
Liberal	E. Taylor	213	6.6	▼1.7
Majority		210	6.5	▼33.4
Registered electors		12,043		
Turnout			26.9	▼1.6
Labour hold		Swing	▼16.7	

=== Bebington ===
==== No. 15 (Higher Bebington and Woodhey) ====
Higher Bebington and Woodhey
Party	Candidate	Votes	%	±%
Conservative	E. Pike	3,197	69.8	▲15.2
Labour	M. Irvine	906	19.8	▼5.7
Liberal	G. Spencer	476	10.4	▼9.5
Majority		2,291	50.0	▲20.9
Registered electors		10,031		
Turnout			45.6	▲1.7
Conservative hold		Swing	▲10.5	

==== No. 16 (Park-New Ferry-North Bromborough) ====
Park-New Ferry-North Bromborough
Party	Candidate	Votes	%	±%
Labour	F. Gregory	1,606	46.2	▼15.0
Conservative	R. Gittins	1,367	39.3	▲0.5
Liberal	W. Walsh	505	14.5	New
Majority		239	6.9	▼15.5
Registered electors		9,785		
Turnout			35.5	▼7.4
Labour hold		Swing	▼7.8	

==== No. 17 (South Bromborough and Eastham) ====
South Bromborough and Eastham
Party	Candidate	Votes	%	±%
Conservative	David Allan	2,723	47.7	▲11.2
Labour	William Lungley	1,882	33.0	▼14.2
Liberal	Phillip Gilchrist	1,105	19.4	▲3.1
Majority		841	14.7	N/A
Registered electors		13,301		
Turnout			42.9	▲2.2
Conservative gain from Labour		Swing	▲12.7	

==== No. 18 (Lower Bebington and Poulton) ====
Lower Bebington and Poulton
Party	Candidate	Votes	%	±%
Conservative	Dorothy Goodfellow	3,119	61.1	▲9.5
Liberal	Thomas Harney	1,144	22.4	▼3.5
Labour	D. Roscoe	839	16.4	▼6.1
Majority		1,975	38.7	▲13.0
Registered electors		12,052		
Turnout			42.3	▲2.0
Conservative hold		Swing	▲6.5	

=== Hoylake ===
==== No. 19 (Caldy and Frankby) ====
Caldy and Frankby
Party	Candidate	Votes	%	±%
Conservative	Reg Cumpstey	3,497	73.2	▼3.0
Liberal	B. Crosbie	790	16.5	New
Labour	J. Seaman	493	10.3	▼13.5
Majority		2,707	56.7	▲4.3
Registered electors		12,575		
Turnout			38.0	▲1.8
Conservative hold		Swing	▲2.2	

==== No. 20 (Central-Hoose-Meols-Park) ====
Central-Hoose-Meols-Park
Party	Candidate	Votes	%	±%
Conservative	W. Tickle	3,121	55.7	▲9.2
Liberal	J. Thomas	2,486	44.3	▲2.4
Majority		635	11.4	▲6.8
Registered electors		11,776		
Turnout			47.6	▼19.6
Conservative gain from Liberal		Swing	▲3.4	

=== Wirral ===
==== No. 21 (Barnston-Gayton-Heswall-Oldfield) ====
Barnston-Gayton-Heswall-Oldfield
Party	Candidate	Votes	%	±%
Conservative	V. Robertson	4,001	78.5	▲12.4
Liberal	G. Collins	911	17.9	▼10.0
Labour	W. Gamet	185	3.6	▼2.5
Majority		3,090	60.6	▲22.4
Registered electors		11,003		
Turnout			46.3	▲1.1
Conservative hold		Swing	▲11.2	

==== No. 22 (Irby-Pensby-Thurstaston) ====
Irby-Pensby-Thurstaston
Party	Candidate	Votes	%	±%
Conservative	W. Leigh	2,441	59.2	▼5.0
Labour	S. Dunn	1,260	30.6	▼5.2
Liberal	A. Conway	420	10.2	New
Majority		1,181	28.6	▲0.2
Registered electors		9,322		
Turnout			44.2	▲1.3
Conservative hold		Swing	▲0.1	

== Changes between 1975 and 1976 ==
Date	Ward	Name	Previous affiliation	New affiliation	Circumstance
September 1975	New Brighton-Wallasey-Warren	Kate Wood	Liberal	Conservative	Defected.

== Notes ==
• italics denote the sitting councillor • bold denotes the winning candidate
