= Birkenhead and Tranmere (ward) =

Metropolitan borough council ward in England

Birkenhead and Tranmere Birkenhead (1979–2004) Argyle-Clifton-Holt (1973–1979)
- Metropolitan Borough ward for Wirral Council
- Birkenhead and Tranmere within Wirral
- County: Merseyside
- Population: 16,542 (2016)
- Registered electors: 10,109 (2019)
- Settlements: Central Birkenhead, Tranmere

Current ward
- Created: 1973
- First Round Councillor: Pat Cleary (Green)
- Second Round Councillor: Amanda Onwuemene (Green)
- Third Round Councillor: Ewan Tomeny (Green)
- Number of Councillors: Three

Overlaps
- UK Parliament constituency: Birkenhead

Birkenhead and Tranmere (previously Argyle-Clifton-Holt, 1973 to 1979, and Birkenhead, 1979 to 2004) is a Wirral Metropolitan Borough Council ward in the Birkenhead Parliamentary constituency.

== Councillors ==
Election	Councillor (Party)	Councillor (Party)	Councillor (Party)	Ref.
1973	Tomlinson (Labour)	Parnall (Labour)	Richard Kimberly (Labour)	
1975	Arthur Smith (Labour)	Parnall (Labour)	Richard Kimberly (Labour)	
1976	Arthur Smith (Labour)	Bill Lungley (Labour)	Richard Kimberly (Labour)	
1978	Arthur Smith (Labour)	Bill Lungley (Labour)	Richard Kimberly (Labour)	
1979	Arthur Smith (Labour)	Bill Lungley (Labour)	Richard Kimberly (Labour)	
1980	Arthur Smith (Labour)	Bill Lungley (Labour)	Richard Kimberly (Labour)	
1982	Arthur Smith (Labour)	Bill Lungley (Labour)	W. Craig (Labour)	
1983	Arthur Smith (Labour)	Bill Lungley (Labour)	W. Craig (Labour)	
1984	Arthur Smith (Labour)	Bill Lungley (Labour)	W. Craig (Labour)	
1986	Arthur Smith (Labour)	Bill Lungley (Labour)	W. Craig (Labour)	
1987	Arthur Smith (Labour)	Bill Lungley (Labour)	W. Craig (Labour)	
1988	Arthur Smith (Labour)	Bill Lungley (Labour)	W. Craig (Labour)	
1990	Arthur Smith (Labour)	Bill Lungley (Labour)	M. Gaskell (Labour)	
1991	Phil Davies (Labour)	Bill Lungley (Labour)	M. Gaskell (Labour)	
1992	Phil Davies (Labour)	D. Gower (Labour)	M. Gaskell (Labour)	
1994	Phil Davies (Labour)	D. Gower (Labour)	David Christian (Labour)	
1995	Phil Davies (Labour)	D. Gower (Labour)	David Christian (Labour)	
1996	Phil Davies (Labour)	D. Gower (Labour)	David Christian (Labour)	
1998	Phil Davies (Labour)	D. Gower (Labour)	David Christian (Labour)	
1999	Phil Davies (Labour)	D. Gower (Labour)	David Christian (Labour)	
2000	Phil Davies (Labour)	Jean Stapleton (Labour)	David Christian (Labour)	
2002	Phil Davies (Labour)	Jean Stapleton (Labour)	David Christian (Labour)	
2003	Phil Davies (Labour)	Jean Stapleton (Labour)	David Christian (Labour)	
2004	Phil Davies (Labour)	Jean Stapleton (Labour)	David Christian (Labour)	
2006	Phil Davies (Labour)	Jean Stapleton (Labour)	Brian Kenny (Labour)	
2007	Phil Davies (Labour)	Jean Stapleton (Labour)	Brian Kenny (Labour)	
2008	Phil Davies (Labour)	Jean Stapleton (Labour)	Brian Kenny (Labour)	
2010	Phil Davies (Labour)	Jean Stapleton (Labour)	Brian Kenny (Labour)	
2011	Phil Davies (Labour)	Jean Stapleton (Labour)	Brian Kenny (Labour)	
2012	Phil Davies (Labour)	Jean Stapleton (Labour)	Brian Kenny (Labour)	
2014	Phil Davies (Labour)	Jean Stapleton (Labour)	Pat Cleary (Green)	
2015	Phil Davies (Labour)	Jean Stapleton (Labour)	Pat Cleary (Green)	
2016	Phil Davies (Labour)	Jean Stapleton (Labour)	Pat Cleary (Green)	
2018	Phil Davies (Labour)	Jean Stapleton (Labour)	Pat Cleary (Green)	
2019	Steve Hayes (Green /Independent)	Jean Stapleton (Labour)	Pat Cleary (Green)	
2020	Steve Hayes (Green /Independent)	Jean Stapleton (Labour)	Pat Cleary (Green)	
2021	Steve Hayes (Green /Independent)	Emily Gleaves (Green)	Pat Cleary (Green)	
2022	Amanda Onwuemene (Green)	Emily Gleaves (Green)	Pat Cleary (Green)	
2023	Amanda Onwuemene (Green)	Ewan Tomeny (Green)	Pat Cleary (Green)	

== Election results ==
2010s – 2000s – 1990s – 1980s – 1970s – Notes – References

=== Elections of the 2020s ===
==== May 2023 ====
Birkenhead and Tranmere (3 seats)
Party	Candidate	Votes	%	±%
Green	Pat Cleary	1,856	65.2	
Green	Amanda Onwuemene	1,590	55.9	
Green	Ewan Tomeny	1,567	55.1	
Labour	Helen Collinson	1,034	36.3	
Labour	Julienne McGeough	916	32.2	
Labour	Piara Miah	792	27.8	
Conservative	Richard Baker	82	2.9	
Freedom Alliance (UK)	Catherine Evans	75	2.6	
Conservative	Ada Lewis	68	2.4	
Liberal Democrats	Edward Smith	62	2.2	
Conservative	Colin Young	60	2.1	
Majority		822	26.4	▲1.4
Registered electors		10,516		
Turnout		2,851	27.1	▼0.1
Rejected ballots		5	0.2	
Green hold		Swing		
Green hold		Swing		
Green hold		Swing		

==== May 2022 ====
Birkenhead and Tranmere (2 seats)
Party	Candidate	Votes	%	±%
Green	Pat Cleary	1,798	59.8	▼0.1
Green	Amanda Onwuemene	1,484	–	–
Labour	Paul Jobson	1,045	34.8	▲3.3
Labour	Tony Murphy	743	–	–
Conservative	Mike Clements	86	2.9	▼2.5
Liberal Democrats	Ross Campbell	78	2.6	▲1.4
Conservative	Colin Young	70	–	–
Liberal Democrats	Edward Smith	26	–	–
Majority		753	25.0	▼5.5
Registered electors		10,337		
Turnout		2,809	27.2	▼0.6
Rejected ballots		7	0.2	▼1.0
Green hold		Swing	▼2.7	
Green gain from Independent		Swing	–	

==== May 2021 ====
Wirral Metropolitan Borough Council election, 6 May 2021: Birkenhead and Tranmere
Party	Candidate	Votes	%	±%
Green	Emily Gleaves	1,765	61.9	▼4.0
Labour	Susan Mahoney	897	31.5	▼0.2
Conservative	June Cowin	153	5.4	▲3.1
Liberal Democrats	Edward Smith	35	1.2	New
Majority		868	30.5	▼3.7
Registered electors		10,400		
Turnout		2,886	27.8	▼5.4
Rejected ballots		36	1.2	▲0.4
Green gain from Labour		Swing	▼1.9	

=== Elections of the 2010s ===
==== May 2019 ====
Wirral Metropolitan Borough Council election, 2 May 2019: Birkenhead and Tranmere
Party	Candidate	Votes	%	±%
Green	Steve Hayes	2,198	65.9	▲16.2
Labour	Bill McGenity	1,058	31.7	▼16.1
Conservative	June Cowin	78	2.3	▼0.2
Majority		1,140	34.2	▲32.3
Registered electors		10,109		
Turnout		3,360	33.2	▼3.7
Rejected ballots		26	0.8	▲0.6
Green gain from Labour		Swing	▲16.2	

==== May 2018 ====
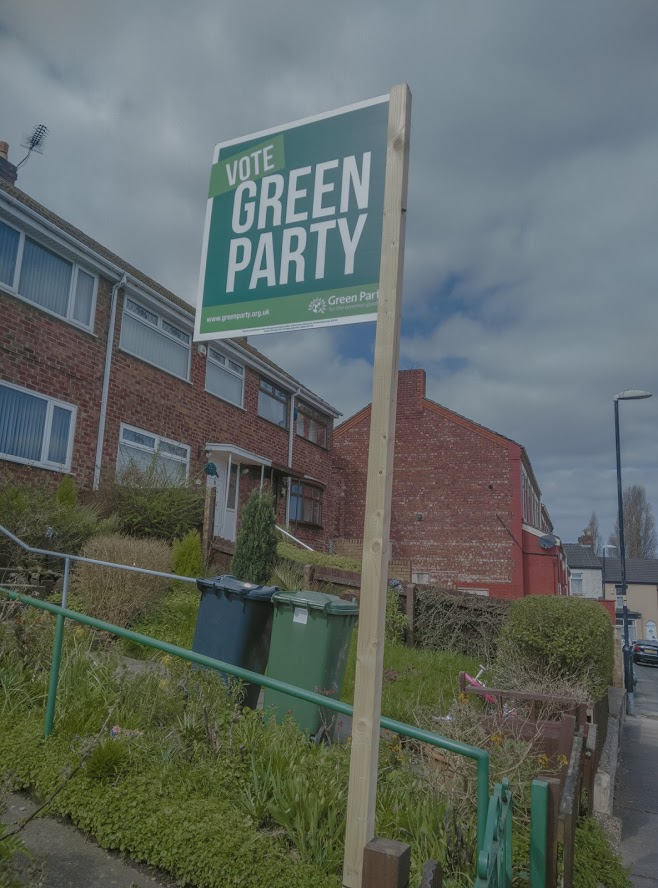
A Green stake board in Holt Hill Terrace, Tranmere, put up in the run-up to the 2018 election.

Wirral Metropolitan Borough Council election, 3 May 2018: Birkenhead and Tranmere
Party	Candidate	Votes	%	±%
Green	Pat Cleary	1,881	49.7	▲7.1
Labour	Paul Jobson	1,810	47.8	▼0.1
Conservative	June Cowin	96	2.5	▲0.7
Majority		71	1.9	N/A
Registered electors		10,281		
Turnout		3,793	36.9	▲3.3
Rejected ballots		6	0.2	▼0.4
Green hold		Swing	▲3.6	

==== May 2016 ====
Wirral Metropolitan Borough Council election, 5 May 2016: Birkenhead and Tranmere
Party	Candidate	Votes	%	±%
Labour	Jean Stapleton	1,555	47.9	▼8.2
Green	Steve Hayes	1,383	42.6	▲11.0
UKIP	Graeme Foster	203	6.3	▼1.7
Conservative	June Cowin	59	1.8	▼1.5
Liberal Democrats	Mary Price	35	1.1	Steady
TUSC	Jack Yarlett	11	0.3	New
Majority		172	5.3	▼19.2
Registered electors		9,703		
Turnout		3,264	33.6	▼23.3
Rejected ballots		18	0.6	
Labour hold		Swing	▼9.6	

==== May 2015 ====
Wirral Metropolitan Borough Council election, 7 May 2015: Birkenhead and Tranmere
Party	Candidate	Votes	%	±%
Labour	Phillip Davies	3,130	56.0	▲15.2
Green	Jayne Clough	1,763	31.6	▼16.1
UKIP	Laurence Sharpe-Stevens	447	8.0	▼1.6
Conservative	June Cowin	183	3.3	▲1.3
Liberal Democrats	Mary Price	61	1.1	New
Majority		1,367	24.5	N/A
Registered electors		9,854		
Turnout			56.9	▲21.5
Labour hold		Swing	▲15.6	

==== May 2014 ====
Wirral Metropolitan Borough Council election, 22 May 2014: Birkenhead and Tranmere
Party	Candidate	Votes	%	±%
Green	Pat Cleary	1,658	47.6	▲6.6
Labour	Brian Kenny	1,421	40.8	▼8.9
UKIP	Laurence Sharpe-Stevens	334	9.6	▲6.3
Conservative	June Cowin	69	2.0	▲0.2
Majority		237	6.8	N/A
Registered electors		9,882		
Turnout			35.4	▲4.2
Green gain from Labour		Swing	▲7.8	

==== May 2012 ====
Wirral Metropolitan Borough Council election, 3 May 2012: Birkenhead and Tranmere
Party	Candidate	Votes	%	±%
Labour	Jean Stapleton	1,474	49.7	▼4.1
Green	Pat Cleary	1,215	41.0	▲6.1
UKIP	David Martin	99	3.3	▼0.3
Liberal Democrats	Allan Brame (Note: Councillor for Oxton, 2018 to present.)	61	2.1	▼0.9
BNP	Joe Killen	61	2.1	New
Conservative	June Cowin	54	1.8	▼2.7
Majority		259	8.7	▼10.3
Registered electors		9,527		
Turnout			31.2	▼2.0
Labour hold		Swing	▼5.1	

==== May 2011 ====
Wirral Metropolitan Borough Council election, 5 May 2011: Birkenhead and Tranmere
Party	Candidate	Votes	%	±%
Labour	Phillip Davies	1,750	53.9	▲2.1
Green	Pat Cleary	1,133	34.9	▲11.3
Conservative	June Cowin	148	4.6	▼3.6
UKIP	David Martin	120	3.7	▼0.6
Liberal Democrats	Allan Brame	95	3.0	▼9.3
Majority		617	19.0	▼9.3
Registered electors		9,807		
Turnout			33.2	▼14.1
Labour hold		Swing	▼4.6	

==== May 2010 ====
Wirral Metropolitan Borough Council election, 6 May 2010: Birkenhead and Tranmere
Party	Candidate	Votes	%	±%
Labour	Brian Kenny	2,409	51.8	▼8.1
Green	Pat Cleary	1,095	23.6	▲12.1
Liberal Democrats	Peter Heppinstall	566	12.2	▼2.6
Conservative	June Cowin	380	8.2	▼5.7
UKIP	David Martin	198	4.3	New
Majority		1,314	28.2	▼16.9
Registered electors		9,956		
Turnout			47.3	▲26.5
Labour hold		Swing	▼8.5	

=== Elections of the 2000s ===
==== May 2008 ====
Wirral Metropolitan Borough Council election, 1 May 2008: Birkenhead and Tranmere
Party	Candidate	Votes	%	±%
Labour	Jean Stapleton	1,278	59.9	▼2.5
Liberal Democrats	Alan Brighouse (Note: Councillor for Oxton, 2010 to 2018.)	315	14.8	▼0.1
Conservative	June Cowin	297	13.9	▲2.5
Green	Catherine Page	244	11.4	▲0.1
Majority		963	45.1	▼2.4
Registered electors		10,278		
Turnout			20.8	▼0.9
Labour hold		Swing	▼1.2	

==== May 2007 ====
Wirral Metropolitan Borough Council election, 3 May 2007: Birkenhead and Tranmere
Party	Candidate	Votes	%	±%
Labour	Phillip Davies	1,399	62.4	▲9.2
Liberal Democrats	Alan Brighouse	333	14.9	▲0.5
Conservative	June Cowin	255	11.4	▲2.2
Green	Catherine Page	254	11.3	▲3.2
Majority		1,066	47.5	▲9.4
Registered electors		10,374		
Turnout			21.7	▲0.8
Labour hold		Swing	▲4.7	

==== May 2006 ====
Wirral Metropolitan Borough Council election, 4 May 2006: Birkenhead and Tranmere
Party	Candidate	Votes	%	±%
Labour	Brian Kenny	1,119	53.2	▲5.5
WIN	Andrew Dow	318	15.1	▲1.2
Liberal Democrats	Alan Brighouse	303	14.4	▲0.7
Conservative	June Cowin	193	9.2	▲1.3
Green	Catherine Page	170	8.1	▼0.4
Majority		801	38.1	▲4.3
Registered electors		10,137		
Turnout			20.9	▼6.1
Labour hold		Swing	▲2.2	

==== June 2004 ====
Wirral Metropolitan Borough Council election, 10 June 2004: Birkenhead and Tranmere
Party	Candidate	Votes	%	±%
Labour	Jean Stapleton (Note: Elected to serve a 4-year term.)	1,400	47.7	N/A
Labour	Phillip Davies (Note: Elected to serve a 3-year term.)	1,292	–	–
Labour	David Christian (Note: Elected to serve a 2-year term.)	1,275	–	–
WIN	Andrew Dow	408	13.9	N/A
Liberal Democrats	Phillip Lloyd	401	13.7	N/A
WIN	Deirdre Baker	382	–	–
Liberal Democrats	Alan Brighouse	376	–	–
Liberal Democrats	Margaret Teggin	349	–	–
WIN	John Maher	311	–	–
Green	Catherine Page	249	8.5	N/A
BNP	John Edwards	246	8.4	N/A
Conservative	Tom Parker	233	7.9	N/A
Conservative	Kenneth Jackson	217	–	–
Conservative	Elizabeth Johnson	186	–	–
Majority		992	33.8	N/A
Registered electors		10,364		
Turnout			27.0	N/A
Labour win (new seat)				
Labour win (new seat)				
Labour win (new seat)				

==== May 2003 ====
Birkenhead within Wirral, 1980 to 2004

Wirral Metropolitan Borough Council election, 1 May 2003: Birkenhead
Party	Candidate	Votes	%	±%
Labour	Phillip Davies	1,157	70.3	▼10.1
Liberal Democrats	Philip Lloyd	188	11.4	▼1.3
Conservative	David Noble	118	7.2	▲0.4
WIN	John Maher	98	6.0	New
Socialist Alliance Against The War	Morag Reid	45	2.7	New
Green	Christopher Childe	40	2.4	New
Majority		969	58.9	▼8.8
Registered electors		9,867		
Turnout			16.7	▼1.8
Labour hold		Swing	▼4.4	

==== May 2002 ====
Wirral Metropolitan Borough Council election, 2 May 2002: Birkenhead
Party	Candidate	Votes	%	±%
Labour	David Christian	1,481	80.4	▲9.1
Liberal Democrats	Ronald Williams	234	12.7	▲1.7
Conservative	Barbara Poole	126	6.8	▼5.0
Majority		1,247	67.7	▲8.2
Registered electors		9,975		
Turnout			18.5	▲3.1
Labour hold		Swing	▲4.1	

==== May 2000 ====
Wirral Metropolitan Borough Council election, 4 May 2000: Birkenhead
Party	Candidate	Votes	%	±%
Labour	Jean Stapleton	1,107	71.3	▼2.8
Conservative	Barbara Poole	184	11.8	▲4.3
Liberal Democrats	Mary Williams	171	11.0	▲1.5
Green	Stuart Harvey	91	5.9	▲2.4
Majority		923	59.5	▼5.1
Registered electors		10,099		
Turnout			15.4	▼2.3
Labour hold		Swing	▼2.6	

=== Elections of the 1990s ===
==== May 1999 ====
Wirral Metropolitan Borough Council election, 6 May 1999: Birkenhead
Party	Candidate	Votes	%	±%
Labour	Phillip Davies	1,298	74.1	▼5.0
Liberal Democrats	Mary Williams	166	9.5	▼11.4
Conservative	Susan Bebell	132	7.5	New
Socialist Labour	Alec McFadden	94	5.4	New
Green	Stuart Harvey	62	3.5	New
Majority		1,132	64.6	▲6.4
Registered electors		9,887		
Turnout			17.7	▲0.4
Labour hold		Swing	▲3.2	

==== May 1998 ====
Wirral Metropolitan Borough Council election, 7 May 1998: Birkenhead
Party	Candidate	Votes	%	±%
Labour	David Christian	1,351	79.1	▼8.9
Liberal Democrats	Mary Williams	357	20.9	▲8.9
Majority		994	58.2	▼17.8
Registered electors		9,892		
Turnout			17.3	▼7.5
Labour hold		Swing	▼8.9	

==== May 1996 ====
Wirral Metropolitan Borough Council election, 2 May 1996: Birkenhead
Party	Candidate	Votes	%	±%
Labour	D. Gower	2,228	88.0	▼0.3
Liberal Democrats	Michael Redfern	303	12.0	▲5.9
Majority		1,925	76.0	▼6.2
Registered electors		10,211		
Turnout			24.8	▼5.9
Labour hold		Swing	▼3.1	

==== May 1995 ====
Wirral Metropolitan Borough Council election, 4 May 1995: Birkenhead
Party	Candidate	Votes	%	±%
Labour	Phillip Davies	2,850	88.3	▲3.9
Liberal Democrats	P. Cooke	196	6.1	▼2.1
Conservative	B. Brassey	183	5.7	▼1.6
Majority		2,654	82.2	▲6.0
Registered electors		10,508		
Turnout			30.7	▼4.2
Labour hold		Swing	▲3.0	

==== May 1994 ====
Wirral Metropolitan Borough Council election, 5 May 1994: Birkenhead
Party	Candidate	Votes	%	±%
Labour	David Christian	3,107	84.4	▲11.4
Liberal Democrats	P. Cooke	303	8.2	▲0.4
Conservative	B. Brassey	270	7.3	▼9.0
Majority		2,804	76.2	▲19.5
Registered electors		10,532		
Turnout			34.9	▲9.4
Labour hold		Swing	▲9.8	

==== May 1992 ====
Wirral Metropolitan Borough Council election, 7 May 1992: Birkenhead
Party	Candidate	Votes	%	±%
Labour	D. Gower	1,998	73.0	▲2.0
Conservative	J. Oliver	447	16.3	▲3.0
Liberal Democrats	P. Cooke	213	7.8	▼3.2
Green	Catherine Page	80	2.9	▼1.8
Majority		1,551	56.7	▼1.0
Registered electors		10,754		
Turnout			25.5	▼8.2
Labour hold		Swing	▼0.5	

==== May 1991 ====
Wirral Metropolitan Borough Council election, 2 May 1991: Birkenhead
Party	Candidate	Votes	%	±%
Labour	Phillip Davies	2,610	71.0	▼10.8
Conservative	J. Oliver	490	13.3	▲5.3
Liberal Democrats	Stephen Niblock	404	11.0	▲4.5
Green	Pamela Mitchell	174	4.7	▲1.0
Majority		2,120	57.7	▼16.1
Registered electors		10,912		
Turnout			33.7	▼9.7
Labour hold		Swing	▼8.1	

==== May 1990 ====
Wirral Metropolitan Borough Council election, 3 May 1990: Birkenhead
Party	Candidate	Votes	%	±%
Labour	M. Gaskell	3,821	81.8	▲5.3
Conservative	J. Oliver	372	8.0	▼4.6
Liberal Democrats	Stephen Niblock	306	6.5	▼1.9
Green	T. Keen	174	3.7	▲1.2
Majority		3,449	73.8	▲9.9
Registered electors		10,766		
Turnout			43.4	▲7.4
Labour hold		Swing	▲5.0	

=== Elections of the 1980s ===
==== May 1988 ====
Wirral Metropolitan Borough Council election, 5 May 1988: Birkenhead
Party	Candidate	Votes	%	±%
Labour	William Lungley	3,035	76.5	▲7.0
Conservative	D. Smith	501	12.6	▲1.0
SLD	Stuart Kelly	333	8.4	▼10.5
Green	A. Harrison	98	2.5	New
Majority		2,534	63.9	▲13.3
Registered electors		11,005		
Turnout			36.0	▼3.2
Labour hold		Swing	▲6.7	

==== May 1987 ====
Wirral Metropolitan Borough Council election, 7 May 1987: Birkenhead
Party	Candidate	Votes	%	±%
Labour	Arthur Smith	3,085	69.5	▼0.5
Alliance	C. Townsend	840	18.9	▼3.1
Conservative	C. Harris	514	11.6	▲3.6
Majority		2,245	50.6	▲2.6
Registered electors		11,314		
Turnout			39.2	▼0.5
Labour hold		Swing	▲1.3	

==== May 1986 ====
Wirral Metropolitan Borough Council election, 8 May 1986: Birkenhead
Party	Candidate	Votes	%	±%
Labour	W. Craig	3,139	70.0	▼3.5
Alliance	R. Francis	987	22.0	▲7.7
Conservative	L. Jones	357	8.0	▼4.2
Majority		2,152	48.0	▼11.2
Registered electors		11,300		
Turnout			39.7	▲4.1
Labour hold		Swing	▼5.6	

==== May 1984 ====
Wirral Metropolitan Borough Council election, 3 May 1984: Birkenhead
Party	Candidate	Votes	%	±%
Labour	William Lungley	3,027	73.5	▲6.9
Alliance	Stephen Niblock	589	14.3	▼6.6
Conservative	Hilary Jones	503	12.2	▼0.4
Majority		2,438	59.2	▲13.5
Registered electors		11,563		
Turnout			35.6	▼1.5
Labour hold		Swing	▲6.8	

==== May 1983 ====
Wirral Metropolitan Borough Council election, 5 May 1983: Birkenhead
Party	Candidate	Votes	%	±%
Labour	Arthur Smith	2,878	66.6	▲7.2
Alliance	C. Lloyd	903	20.9	▼6.7
Conservative	A. Clement	543	12.6	▼0.3
Majority		1,975	45.7	▲13.9
Registered electors		11,663		
Turnout			37.1	▲3.9
Labour gain from (new seat)		Swing	▲7.0	

==== May 1982 ====
Wirral Metropolitan Borough Council election, 6 May 1982: Birkenhead
Party	Candidate	Votes	%	±%
Labour	W. Craig	2,328	59.4	▼7.0
Alliance	C. Lloyd	1,081	27.6	▲7.0
Conservative	F. Dawson	507	12.9	▼0.1
Majority		1,247	31.8	▼14.0
Registered electors		11,780		
Turnout			33.2	▲3.7
Labour gain from (new seat)		Swing	▼7.0	

==== May 1980 ====
Wirral Metropolitan Borough Council election, 1 May 1980: Birkenhead
Party	Candidate	Votes	%	±%
Labour	William Lungley	2,343	66.4	N/A
Liberal	R. Curtis	728	20.6	N/A
Conservative	V. Garceau	460	13.0	N/A
Majority		1,615	45.8	N/A
Registered electors		11,976		
Turnout			29.5	N/A
Labour win (new seat)				

=== Elections of the 1970s ===
==== May 1979 ====
Wirral Metropolitan Borough Council election, 3 May 1979: Argyle-Clifton-Holt
Party	Candidate	Votes	%	±%
Labour	Arthur Smith	2,867	59.2	▲6.5
Conservative	A. Adams	1,092	22.5	▲1.0
Liberal	J. Smith	887	18.3	▼4.1
Majority		1,775	36.7	▲6.4
Registered electors		7,259		
Turnout			66.8	▲34.4
Labour hold		Swing	▲3.2	

==== May 1978 ====
Wirral Metropolitan Borough Council election, 4 May 1978: Argyle-Clifton-Holt
Party	Candidate	Votes	%	±%
Labour	Richard Kimberly	1,240	52.7	▲5.8
Liberal	Anna Blumenthal	527	22.4	▼16.9
Conservative	B. Jones	506	21.5	▲7.7
National Front	Howard Hawksley	78	3.3	New
Majority		713	30.3	▲22.7
Registered electors		7,259		
Turnout			32.4	▼1.6
Labour hold		Swing	▲11.4	

==== May 1976 ====
Wirral Metropolitan Borough Council election, 6 May 1976: Argyle-Clifton-Holt
Party	Candidate	Votes	%	±%
Labour	William Lungley	1,354	46.9	▲2.3
Liberal	Roy Perkins	1,135	39.3	▲0.5
Conservative	F. Morton	397	13.8	▼2.9
Majority		219	7.6	▲1.8
Registered electors		8,498		
Turnout			34.0	▲5.4
Labour hold		Swing	▲0.9	

==== May 1975 ====
Wirral Metropolitan Borough Council election, 1 May 1975: Argyle-Clifton-Holt
Party	Candidate	Votes	%	±%
Labour	Arthur Smith	1,096	44.6	▼28.2
Liberal	D. Boxer	954	38.8	New
Conservative	L. Peers	410	16.7	▼10.5
Majority		142	5.8	▼39.8
Registered electors		8,590		
Turnout			28.6	▲4.5
Labour hold		Swing	▼19.9	

==== April 1973 ====
Wirral Metropolitan Borough Council election, 10 May 1973: Argyle-Clifton-Holt
Party	Candidate	Votes	%	±%
Labour	Richard Kimberly (Note: Elected to serve a 5-year term.)	1,580	72.8	N/A
Labour	Parnall	1,577	–	–
Labour	Tomlinson	1,515	–	–
Conservative	L. Peers	589	27.2	N/A
Conservative	Wilson	546	–	–
Conservative	Gates	530	–	–
Majority			45.7	N/A
Registered electors		8,985		
Turnout			24.1	N/A
Labour win (new seat)				
Labour win (new seat)				
Labour win (new seat)				

== Notes ==
• italics denotes the sitting councillor • bold denotes the winning candidate
