= 1980 Wirral Metropolitan Borough Council election =

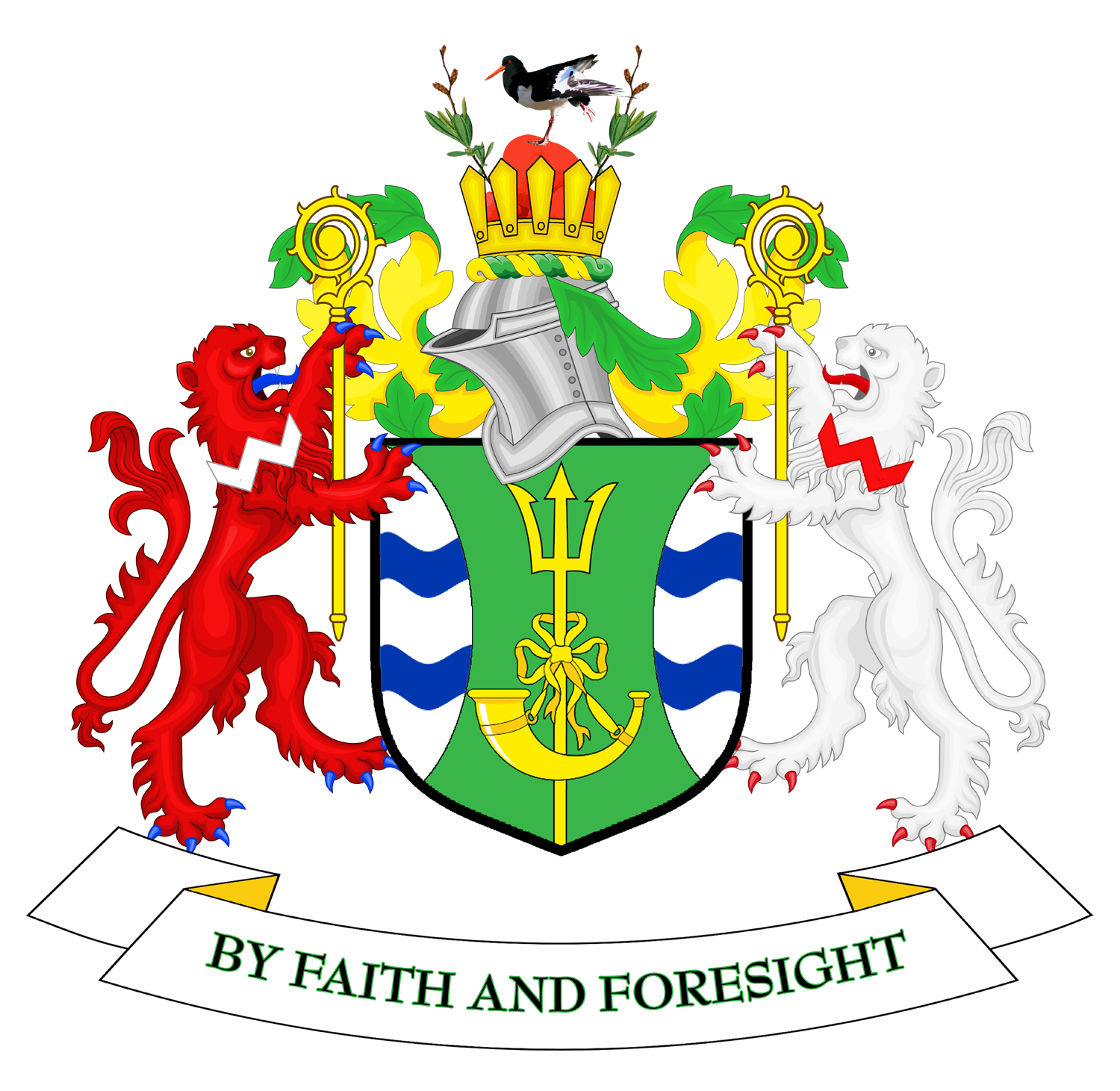
- 1 May 1980

23 of 66 seats (One Third and one by-election) to Wirral Metropolitan Borough Council 34 seats needed for a majority
- Turnout: 36.8% (▼38.5%)
| | First party | Second party | Third party |
|---|---|---|---|
| | Con | Lab | Lib |
| Leader | Harry Deverill | Richard Kimberley | Roy Perkins |
| Party | Conservative | Labour | Liberal |
| Leader's seat | Prenton | Birkenhead | Claughton |
| Last election | 12 seats, 48.0% | 9 seats, 36.2% | 2 seats, 15.6% |
| Seats before | 40 | 20 | 6 |
| Seats won | 12 | 9 | 2 |
| Seats after | 37 | 23 | 6 |
| Seat change | ▼3 | ▲3 | 0 |
| Popular vote | 44,665 | 36,548 | 14,885 |
| Percentage | 46.3% | 37.9% | 15.4% |
| Swing | ▼1.7% | ▲1.7% | ▼0.2% |
- Map of results of 1980 election
Leader of the Council before election
Harry Deverill
Conservative
Leader of the Council after election
Harry Deverill
Conservative

The 1980 Wirral Metropolitan Borough Council election took place on 1 May 1980 to elect members of Wirral Metropolitan Borough Council in England. This election was held on the same day as other local elections.

The first third of the council was up for election to new boundaries.

Every councillor was assigned a new ward before the election took place.

After the election, the composition of the council was:

| Party | Seats | ± |
|---|---|---|
| Conservative | 37 | ▼3 |
| Labour | 23 | ▲3 |
| Liberal | 6 | 0 |

== Election results ==
=== Overall election result ===
Overall result compared with 1979.

Wirral Metropolitan Borough Council election result, 1980
| Party | Candidates | | | | Votes | | |
| Party | Stood | Elected | Net | % of total | % | No. | Net % |
|---|---|---|---|---|---|---|---|
| Conservative | 23 | 12 | ▼3 | 54.5 | 46.3 | 44,665 | ▼1.7 |
| Labour | 23 | 9 | ▲3 | 36.4 | 37.9 | 36,548 | ▲1.7 |
| Liberal | 19 | 2 | 0 | 9.1 | 15.4 | 14,885 | ▼0.2 |
| Ecology | 1 | 0 | 0 | 0.0 | 0.1 | 119 | New |
| Communist | 1 | 0 | 0 | 0.0 | 0.1 | 116 | ▲0.1 |
| British Democratic | 1 | 0 | 0 | 0.0 | 0.1 | 109 | New |

(Note: % of total refers to % of wards won.)

== Ward results ==
=== Bebington ===
Bebington
| Party | Candidate | Votes | % | ±% |
|---|---|---|---|---|
| Conservative | Tim Richmond | 2,985 | 59.9 | N/A |
| Labour | A. Riley | 1,450 | 29.1 | N/A |
| Liberal | Penelope Globy | 552 | 11.1 | N/A |
| Majority | | 1,535 | 30.8 | N/A |
| Registered electors | | 11,445 | | |
| Turnout | | | 43.6 | N/A |
| Conservative win (new seat) | | | | |

=== Bidston ===
Bidston
| Party | Candidate | Votes | % | ±% |
|---|---|---|---|---|
| Labour | A. Jones (Note: Elected to serve a 4-year term.) | 3,060 | 81.4 | N/A |
| Labour | John Cocker (Note: Elected to serve a 1-year term.) | 2,860 | – | – |
| Conservative | W. Fallon | 516 | 13.7 | N/A |
| Conservative | G. Bird | 437 | – | – |
| Liberal | P. Lloyd | 185 | 4.9 | N/A |
| Majority | | 2,544 | 67.6 | N/A |
| Registered electors | | 11,320 | | |
| Turnout | | | 33.2 | N/A |
| Labour win (new seat) | | | | |
| Labour win (new seat) | | | | |

=== Birkenhead ===
Birkenhead
| Party | Candidate | Votes | % | ±% |
|---|---|---|---|---|
| Labour | William Lungley | 2,343 | 66.4 | N/A |
| Liberal | R. Curtis | 728 | 20.6 | N/A |
| Conservative | V. Garceau | 460 | 13.0 | N/A |
| Majority | | 1,615 | 45.7 | N/A |
| Registered electors | | 11,976 | | |
| Turnout | | | 29.5 | N/A |
| Labour win (new seat) | | | | |

=== Bromborough ===
Bromborough
| Party | Candidate | Votes | % | ±% |
|---|---|---|---|---|
| Labour | Ralph Dunning | 2,574 | 52.3 | N/A |
| Conservative | A. Green | 1,764 | 35.9 | N/A |
| Liberal | D. Cottrell | 581 | 11.8 | N/A |
| Majority | | 810 | 16.5 | N/A |
| Registered electors | | 11,730 | | |
| Turnout | | | 41.9 | N/A |
| Labour win (new seat) | | | | |

=== Clatterbridge ===
Clatterbridge
| Party | Candidate | Votes | % | ±% |
|---|---|---|---|---|
| Conservative | Michael Moore | 3,459 | 59.9 | N/A |
| Labour | A. Woods | 1,368 | 23.7 | N/A |
| Liberal | M. Cody | 950 | 16.4 | N/A |
| Majority | | 2,091 | 36.2 | N/A |
| Registered electors | | 13,265 | | |
| Turnout | | | 43.6 | N/A |
| Conservative win (new seat) | | | | |

=== Claughton ===
Claughton
| Party | Candidate | Votes | % | ±% |
|---|---|---|---|---|
| Liberal | John Evans | 1,830 | 36.9 | N/A |
| Conservative | B. Lloyd | 1,616 | 32.6 | N/A |
| Labour | Vera Ruck | 1,392 | 28.1 | N/A |
| Ecology | Moira Gommon | 119 | 2.4 | N/A |
| Majority | | 214 | 4.3 | N/A |
| Registered electors | | 10,917 | | |
| Turnout | | | 45.4 | N/A |
| Liberal win (new seat) | | | | |

=== Eastham ===
Eastham
| Party | Candidate | Votes | % | ±% |
|---|---|---|---|---|
| Conservative | A. Varley | 1,900 | 37.4 | N/A |
| Labour | W. Craig | 1,674 | 32.9 | N/A |
| Liberal | R. Palmer | 1,510 | 29.7 | N/A |
| Majority | | 226 | 4.4 | N/A |
| Registered electors | | 11,959 | | |
| Turnout | | | 42.5 | N/A |
| Conservative win (new seat) | | | | |

=== Egerton ===
Egerton
| Party | Candidate | Votes | % | ±% |
|---|---|---|---|---|
| Labour | R. McGenity | 1,930 | 44.5 | N/A |
| Conservative | K. Allen | 1,448 | 33.4 | N/A |
| Liberal | G. Quinn | 955 | 22.0 | N/A |
| Majority | | 482 | 11.1 | N/A |
| Registered electors | | 11,620 | | |
| Turnout | | | 37.3 | N/A |
| Labour win (new seat) | | | | |

=== Heswall ===
Heswall
| Party | Candidate | Votes | % | ±% |
|---|---|---|---|---|
| Conservative | A. Maddox | 3,866 | 79.5 | N/A |
| Liberal | S. Birch | 554 | 11.4 | N/A |
| Labour | R. Harris | 444 | 9.1 | N/A |
| Majority | | 3,312 | 68.1 | N/A |
| Registered electors | | 12,781 | | |
| Turnout | | | 38.1 | N/A |
| Conservative win (new seat) | | | | |

=== Hoylake ===
Hoylake
| Party | Candidate | Votes | % | ±% |
|---|---|---|---|---|
| Conservative | Frank Jones | 3,175 | 71.6 | N/A |
| Liberal | F. Lewis | 725 | 16.4 | N/A |
| Labour | J. Robb | 534 | 12.0 | N/A |
| Majority | | 2,450 | 55.3 | N/A |
| Registered electors | | 12,635 | | |
| Turnout | | | 35.1 | N/A |
| Conservative win (new seat) | | | | |

=== Leasowe ===
Leasowe
| Party | Candidate | Votes | % | ±% |
|---|---|---|---|---|
| Labour | Jim Edwards | 2,470 | 68.8 | N/A |
| Conservative | L. Kennedy | 835 | 23.3 | N/A |
| Liberal | B. Thomas | 286 | 8.0 | N/A |
| Majority | | 1,635 | 45.5 | N/A |
| Registered electors | | 10,891 | | |
| Turnout | | | 33.0 | N/A |
| Labour win (new seat) | | | | |

=== Liscard ===
Liscard
| Party | Candidate | Votes | % | ±% |
|---|---|---|---|---|
| Conservative | M. Ebbs | 1,964 | 46.2 | N/A |
| Labour | G. Watkins | 1,627 | 38.2 | N/A |
| Liberal | M. Canning | 664 | 15.6 | N/A |
| Majority | | 337 | 7.9 | N/A |
| Registered electors | | 12,272 | | |
| Turnout | | | 34.7 | N/A |
| Conservative win (new seat) | | | | |

=== Moreton ===
Moreton
| Party | Candidate | Votes | % | ±% |
|---|---|---|---|---|
| Conservative | I. Walker | 1,667 | 47.1 | N/A |
| Labour | John McCabe | 1,583 | 44.7 | N/A |
| Liberal | J. Jenkins | 288 | 8.1 | N/A |
| Majority | | 84 | 2.4 | N/A |
| Registered electors | | 12,587 | | |
| Turnout | | | 28.1 | N/A |
| Conservative win (new seat) | | | | |

=== New Brighton ===
New Brighton
| Party | Candidate | Votes | % | ±% |
|---|---|---|---|---|
| Conservative | R. Venner | 2,088 | 54.1 | N/A |
| Labour | J. Fairbrother | 899 | 23.3 | N/A |
| Liberal | Neil Thomas | 760 | 19.7 | N/A |
| British Democratic Party (1979) | G. Faulkner | 109 | 2.8 | N/A |
| Majority | | 1,189 | 30.8 | N/A |
| Registered electors | | 11,743 | | |
| Turnout | | | 32.8 | N/A |
| Conservative win (new seat) | | | | |

=== Oxton ===
Oxton
| Party | Candidate | Votes | % | ±% |
|---|---|---|---|---|
| Liberal | Michael Cooke | 2,028 | 42.4 | N/A |
| Conservative | K. Hughes | 1,691 | 35.3 | N/A |
| Labour | J. Coates | 1,065 | 22.3 | N/A |
| Majority | | 337 | 7.1 | N/A |
| Registered electors | | 11,586 | | |
| Turnout | | | 41.3 | N/A |
| Liberal win (new seat) | | | | |

=== Prenton ===
Prenton
| Party | Candidate | Votes | % | ±% |
|---|---|---|---|---|
| Conservative | Harry Deverill | 2,828 | 59.0 | N/A |
| Labour | H. Ellis-Thomas | 1,962 | 41.0 | N/A |
| Majority | | 866 | 18.0 | N/A |
| Registered electors | | 12,685 | | |
| Turnout | | | 37.8 | N/A |
| Conservative win (new seat) | | | | |

=== Royden ===
Royden
| Party | Candidate | Votes | % | ±% |
|---|---|---|---|---|
| Conservative | J. Gaughan | 2,251 | 64.9 | N/A |
| Liberal | B. Crosbie | 733 | 21.1 | N/A |
| Labour | M. Grant | 484 | 14.0 | N/A |
| Majority | | 1,518 | 43.8 | N/A |
| Registered electors | | 10,920 | | |
| Turnout | | | 31.8 | N/A |
| Conservative win (new seat) | | | | |

=== Seacombe ===
Seacombe
| Party | Candidate | Votes | % | ±% |
|---|---|---|---|---|
| Labour | T. Duffy | 2,614 | 67.0 | N/A |
| Conservative | D. Watson | 939 | 24.1 | N/A |
| Liberal | M. Johnston | 351 | 9.0 | N/A |
| Majority | | 1,675 | 42.9 | N/A |
| Registered electors | | 13,101 | | |
| Turnout | | | 29.8 | N/A |
| Labour win (new seat) | | | | |

=== Thurstaston ===
Thurstaston
| Party | Candidate | Votes | % | ±% |
|---|---|---|---|---|
| Conservative | Sid Dunn | 2,886 | 76.1 | N/A |
| Labour | W. Gamet | 908 | 23.9 | N/A |
| Majority | | 1,978 | 52.2 | N/A |
| Registered electors | | 11,774 | | |
| Turnout | | | 32.2 | N/A |
| Conservative win (new seat) | | | | |

=== Tranmere ===
Tranmere
| Party | Candidate | Votes | % | ±% |
|---|---|---|---|---|
| Labour | William Nock | 2,417 | 66.4 | N/A |
| Conservative | A. Adams | 782 | 21.5 | N/A |
| Liberal | R. Williams | 323 | 8.9 | N/A |
| Communist | J. Norris | 116 | 3.2 | N/A |
| Majority | | 1,635 | 44.9 | N/A |
| Registered electors | | 11,075 | | |
| Turnout | | | 32.8 | N/A |
| Labour win (new seat) | | | | |

=== Upton ===
Upton
| Party | Candidate | Votes | % | ±% |
|---|---|---|---|---|
| Labour | R. Davies | 2,779 | 58.6 | N/A |
| Conservative | M. Winter | 1,962 | 41.4 | N/A |
| Majority | | 817 | 17.2 | N/A |
| Registered electors | | 12,416 | | |
| Turnout | | | 38.2 | N/A |
| Labour win (new seat) | | | | |

=== Wallasey ===
Wallasey
| Party | Candidate | Votes | % | ±% |
|---|---|---|---|---|
| Conservative | Kate Wood | 3,583 | 65.9 | N/A |
| Labour | D. Mason | 971 | 17.9 | N/A |
| Liberal | N. Stribbling | 882 | 16.2 | N/A |
| Majority | | 2,612 | 48.0 | N/A |
| Registered electors | | 12,587 | | |
| Turnout | | | 43.2 | N/A |
| Conservative win (new seat) | | | | |

== Notes ==
• italics denote a sitting councillor • bold denotes the winning candidate
