= 1983 Wirral Metropolitan Borough Council election =

Wirral Metropolitan Borough Council election in 1983

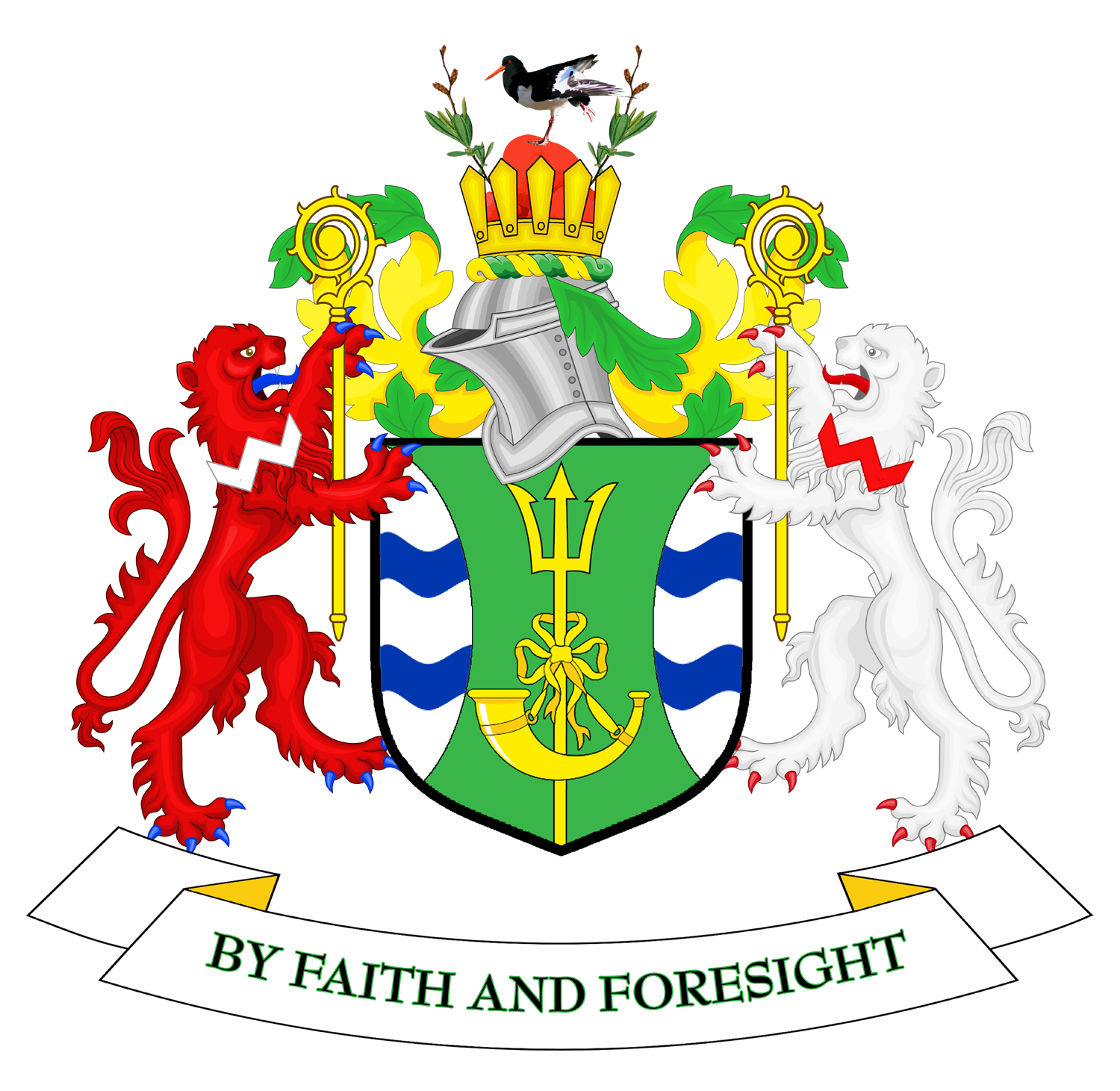
- 5 May 1983

22 of 66 seats (One Third) to Wirral Metropolitan Borough Council 34 seats needed for a majority
- Turnout: 42.7% (▲2.2%)
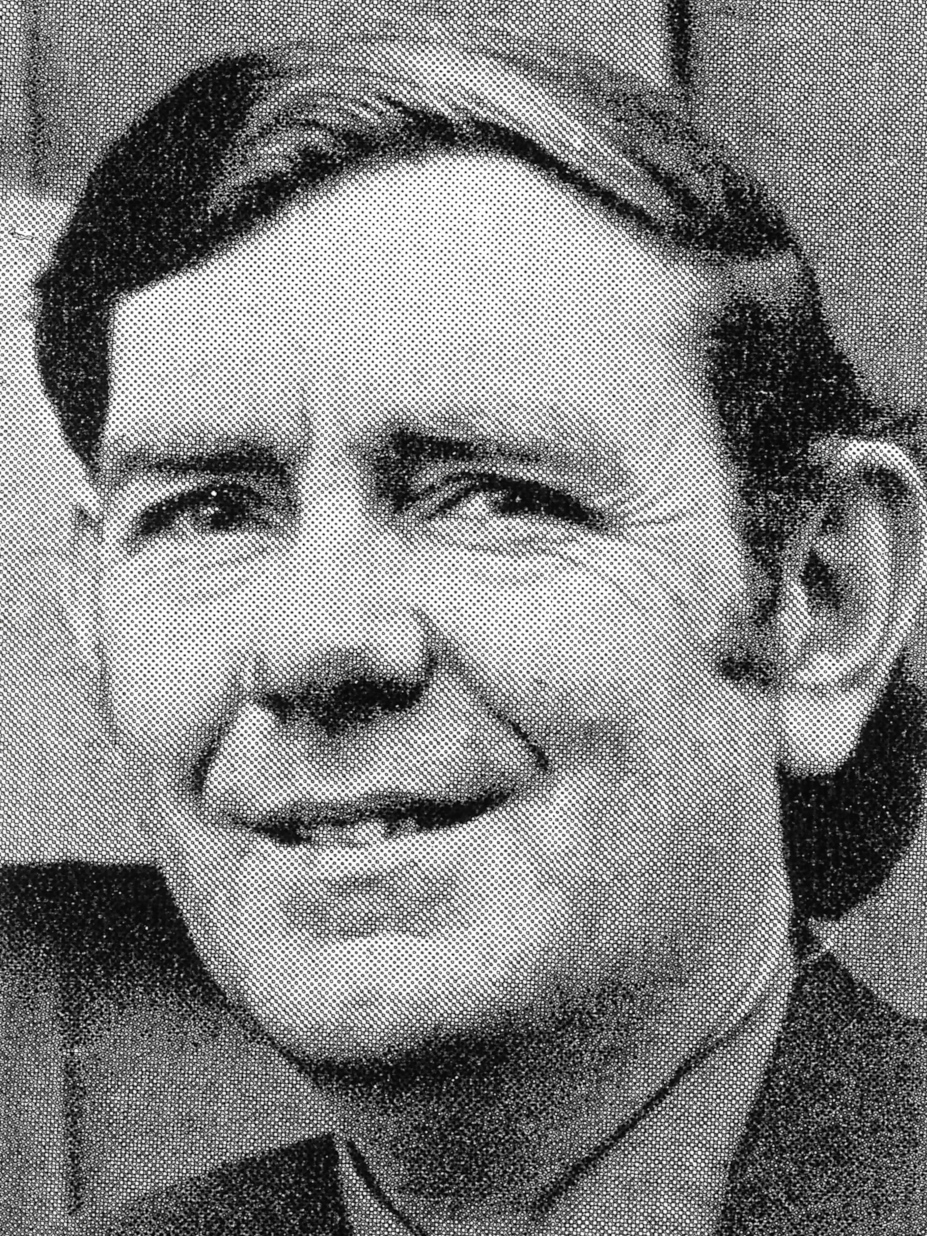
	First party	Second party	Third party
		Lab	SDP–Lib
Leader	David Fletcher	George Clark	Roy Perkins
Party	Conservative	Labour	Alliance
Leader's seat	Thurstaston	Leasowe	Claughton
Last election	11 seats, 44.5%	8 seats, 27.8%	3 seats, 27.6%
Seats before	35	25	6
Seats won	11	8	3
Seats after	34	24	8
Seat change	▼1	▼1	▲2
Popular vote	49,878	39,402	22,246
Percentage	44.7%	35.3%	19.9%
Swing	▲0.2%	▲7.5%	▼7.7%
- Map of results of 1983 election
Leader of the Council before election
David Fletcher
Conservative
Leader of the Council after election
David Fletcher
Conservative

The 1983 Wirral Metropolitan Borough Council election took place on 5 May 1983 to elect members of Wirral Metropolitan Borough Council in England. This election was held on the same day as other local elections.

The third third of the council was up for election to new boundaries.

After the election, the composition of the council was:

Party	Seats	±
Conservative	34	▼1
Labour	24	▼1
Alliance	8	▲2

== Election results ==
=== Overall election result ===
Overall result compared with 1982.

Wirral Metropolitan Borough Council election result, 1983
Party	Candidates				Votes		
Party	Stood	Elected	Net	% of total	%	No.	Net %
Conservative	22	11	▼1	50.0	44.7	49,878	▲0.2
Labour	22	8	▼1	36.4	35.3	39,402	▲7.5
Alliance	22	3	▲2	13.6	19.9	22,246	▼7.7
Independent	2	0	Steady	0.0	0.1	139	N/A

== Ward results ==
=== Bebington ===
Bebington
Party	Candidate	Votes	%	±%
Conservative	J. Shennan	3,280	56.6	▼0.5
Labour	P. McCarthy	1,649	28.5	▲6.0
Alliance	Alan Brighouse	863	14.9	▼5.4
Majority		1,631	28.2	▼6.4
Registered electors		11,407		
Turnout			50.8	▲2.2
Conservative gain from (new seat)		Swing	▼3.3	

=== Bidston ===
Bidston
Party	Candidate	Votes	%	±%
Labour	Andrew Davies	3,333	80.3	▲4.8
Conservative	R. Firth	461	11.1	▼0.3
Alliance	W. Wood	357	8.6	▼4.4
Majority		2,872	69.2	▲6.7
Registered electors		11,183		
Turnout			37.1	▲3.1
Labour hold		Swing	▲3.4	

=== Birkenhead ===
Birkenhead
Party	Candidate	Votes	%	±%
Labour	Arthur Smith	2,878	66.6	▲7.2
Alliance	C. Lloyd	903	20.9	▼6.7
Conservative	A. Clement	543	12.6	▼0.3
Majority		1,975	45.7	▲13.9
Registered electors		11,663		
Turnout			37.1	▲3.9
Labour gain from (new seat)		Swing	▲7.0	

=== Bromborough ===
Bromborough
Party	Candidate	Votes	%	±%
Labour	Audrey Moore	2,461	48.4	▲7.6
Conservative	E. Davies	1,904	37.4	Steady
Alliance	R. Williams	721	14.2	▼7.6
Majority		557	11.0	▲7.6
Registered electors		11,715		
Turnout			43.4	▲1.3
Labour gain from (new seat)		Swing	▲3.8	

=== Clatterbridge ===
Clatterbridge
Party	Candidate	Votes	%	±%
Conservative	Dorothy Goodfellow	3,999	62.4	▲1.7
Labour	G. Farmer	1,361	21.2	▲4.8
Alliance	P. Lloyd	1,045	16.3	▼6.6
Majority		2,638	41.2	▲3.4
Registered electors		13,698		
Turnout			46.8	▲1.8
Conservative gain from (new seat)		Swing	▲1.7	

=== Claughton ===
Claughton
Party	Candidate	Votes	%	±%
Alliance	R. Curtis	2,029	39.0	▼7.8
Conservative	Ian McKellar	1,835	35.2	▲8.3
Labour	C. Holmes	1,345	25.8	▲1.0
Majority		194	3.7	▼16.2
Registered electors		10,780		
Turnout			48.3	▲11.8
Alliance gain from (new seat)		Swing	▼8.1	

=== Eastham ===
Eastham
Party	Candidate	Votes	%	±%
Alliance	George Mitchell	2,416	39.7	▼12.1
Conservative	M. Evans	2,003	32.9	▲4.4
Labour	P. Taylor	1,674	27.5	▲7.9
Majority		413	6.8	▼16.5
Registered electors		12,037		
Turnout			50.6	▲2.1
Alliance gain from (new seat)		Swing	▼8.3	

=== Egerton ===
Egerton
Party	Candidate	Votes	%	±%
Labour	Walter Smith	2,538	50.5	▲11.1
Conservative	M. Cureton	1,643	32.7	▼3.6
Alliance	Simon Holbrook	845	16.8	▼7.6
Majority		895	17.8	▲14.7
Registered electors		11,561		
Turnout			43.5	▲5.0
Labour gain from (new seat)		Swing	▲7.4	

=== Heswall ===
Heswall
Party	Candidate	Votes	%	±%
Conservative	V. Robertson	4,066	74.5	▼2.0
Alliance	E. Judge	888	16.3	▼1.3
Labour	J. Halling	505	9.3	▲3.3
Majority		3,178	58.2	▼0.7
Registered electors		12,879		
Turnout			42.4	▲2.4
Conservative gain from (new seat)		Swing	▼0.4	

=== Hoylake ===
Hoylake
Party	Candidate	Votes	%	±%
Conservative	H. Thompson	3,652	65.0	▲1.9
Alliance	C. Robertshaw	1,456	25.9	▼11.0
Labour	John McCabe	511	9.1	New
Majority		2,196	39.1	▲12.8
Registered electors		12,589		
Turnout			44.6	▼0.8
Conservative gain from (new seat)		Swing	▲6.5	

=== Leasowe ===
Leasowe
Party	Candidate	Votes	%	±%
Labour	Ken Fox	2,447	62.5	▲8.8
Conservative	E. Sanders	1,015	25.9	▼0.4
Alliance	B. Thomas	451	11.5	▼8.5
Majority		1,432	36.6	▲9.2
Registered electors		10,851		
Turnout			36.1	▲3.1
Labour gain from (new seat)		Swing	▲4.6	

=== Liscard ===
Liscard
Party	Candidate	Votes	%	±%
Conservative	John Hale	2,352	47.7	▼0.6
Labour	Keith Rimmer	1,668	33.9	▲6.8
Alliance	Moira Gallagher	906	18.4	▼6.2
Majority		684	13.9	▼7.3
Registered electors		12,170		
Turnout			40.5	▲0.7
Conservative gain from (new seat)		Swing	▼3.7	

=== Moreton ===
Moreton
Party	Candidate	Votes	%	±%
Conservative	David Williams	1,918	44.0	▼0.8
Labour	Stuart Marshall-Clarke	1,767	40.6	▲10.7
Alliance	J. Eyres	670	15.4	▼9.9
Majority		151	3.5	▼11.4
Registered electors		9,394		
Turnout			46.4	▲4.8
Conservative gain from (new seat)		Swing	▼5.8	

=== New Brighton ===
New Brighton
Party	Candidate	Votes	%	±%
Conservative	B. Nottage	2,289	53.2	▼2.9
Labour	I. Jackson	1,312	30.5	▲8.0
Alliance	G. Pumford	705	16.4	▼4.9
Majority		977	22.7	▼10.9
Registered electors		11,720		
Turnout			36.7	▼1.2
Conservative gain from (new seat)		Swing	▼5.5	

=== Oxton ===
Oxton
Party	Candidate	Votes	%	±%
Alliance	L. Egdell	2,172	41.2	▼12.5
Conservative	T. Birkett	1,946	36.9	▲6.8
Labour	Pauline Cocker	1,117	21.2	▲6.5
Independent	R. Cross	36	0.7	New
Majority		226	4.3	▼19.3
Registered electors		11,409		
Turnout			46.2	▲3.5
Alliance gain from (new seat)		Swing	▼9.7	

=== Prenton ===
Prenton
Party	Candidate	Votes	%	±%
Conservative	William Taylor	2,944	50.0	▲1.1
Labour	P. Brady	1,908	32.4	▲2.0
Alliance	M. Miller	1,039	17.6	▼3.1
Majority		1,036	17.6	▼0.9
Registered electors		12,839		
Turnout			45.9	Steady
Conservative gain from (new seat)		Swing	▼0.4	

=== Royden ===
Royden
Party	Candidate	Votes	%	±%
Conservative	Reg Cumpstey	3,013	64.7	▼0.8
Alliance	A. Colwell	1,084	23.3	▼11.2
Labour	J. Grant	562	12.1	New
Majority		1,929	41.4	▲10.4
Registered electors		11,987		
Turnout			38.9	▼1.4
Conservative gain from (new seat)		Swing	▲5.2	

=== Seacombe ===
Seacombe
Party	Candidate	Votes	%	±%
Labour	Barney Gilfoyle	2,754	61.0	▲11.8
Conservative	L. Kennedy	1,179	26.1	▲1.7
Alliance	C. Holmes	584	12.9	▼13.5
Majority		1,575	34.9	▲12.1
Registered electors		12,584		
Turnout			35.9	▲1.4
Labour gain from (new seat)		Swing	▲6.1	

=== Thurstaston ===
Thurstaston
Party	Candidate	Votes	%	±%
Conservative	Donald McCubbin	3,409	66.6	▼0.7
Labour	J. Burden	913	17.8	▲8.2
Alliance	John Thornton	799	15.6	▼7.5
Majority		2,496	48.7	▲4.6
Registered electors		12,270		
Turnout			41.7	▲0.3
Conservative gain from (new seat)		Swing	▲2.3	

=== Tranmere ===
Tranmere
Party	Candidate	Votes	%	±%
Labour	Geoff Barker	2,983	70.4	▲10.6
Conservative	W. Lloyd	773	18.2	▼1.2
Alliance	Edward Cunniffe	481	11.4	▼9.5
Majority		2,210	52.2	▲13.3
Registered electors		11,479		
Turnout			36.9	▲4.9
Labour gain from (new seat)		Swing	▲6.7	

=== Upton ===
Upton
Party	Candidate	Votes	%	±%
Labour	Peter Corcoran	2,775	49.6	▲4.9
Conservative	D. Bartlett	1,949	34.9	▲0.6
Alliance	Eric Copestake	765	13.7	▼7.4
Independent	M. Wilkinson	103	1.8	New
Majority		826	14.8	▲4.4
Registered electors		12,752		
Turnout			43.9	▲1.9
Labour gain from (new seat)		Swing	▲2.2	

=== Wallasey ===
Wallasey
Party	Candidate	Votes	%	±%
Conservative	C. Whatling	3,705	64.9	▲1.8
Alliance	I. Horton	1,067	18.7	▼8.3
Labour	Vincent McGee	941	16.5	▲6.6
Majority		2,638	46.2	▲10.1
Registered electors		12,612		
Turnout			45.3	▼0.7
Conservative gain from (new seat)		Swing	▲5.1	

== Notes ==
• italics denote a sitting councillor • bold denotes the winning candidate
