= 2000 Wirral Metropolitan Borough Council election =

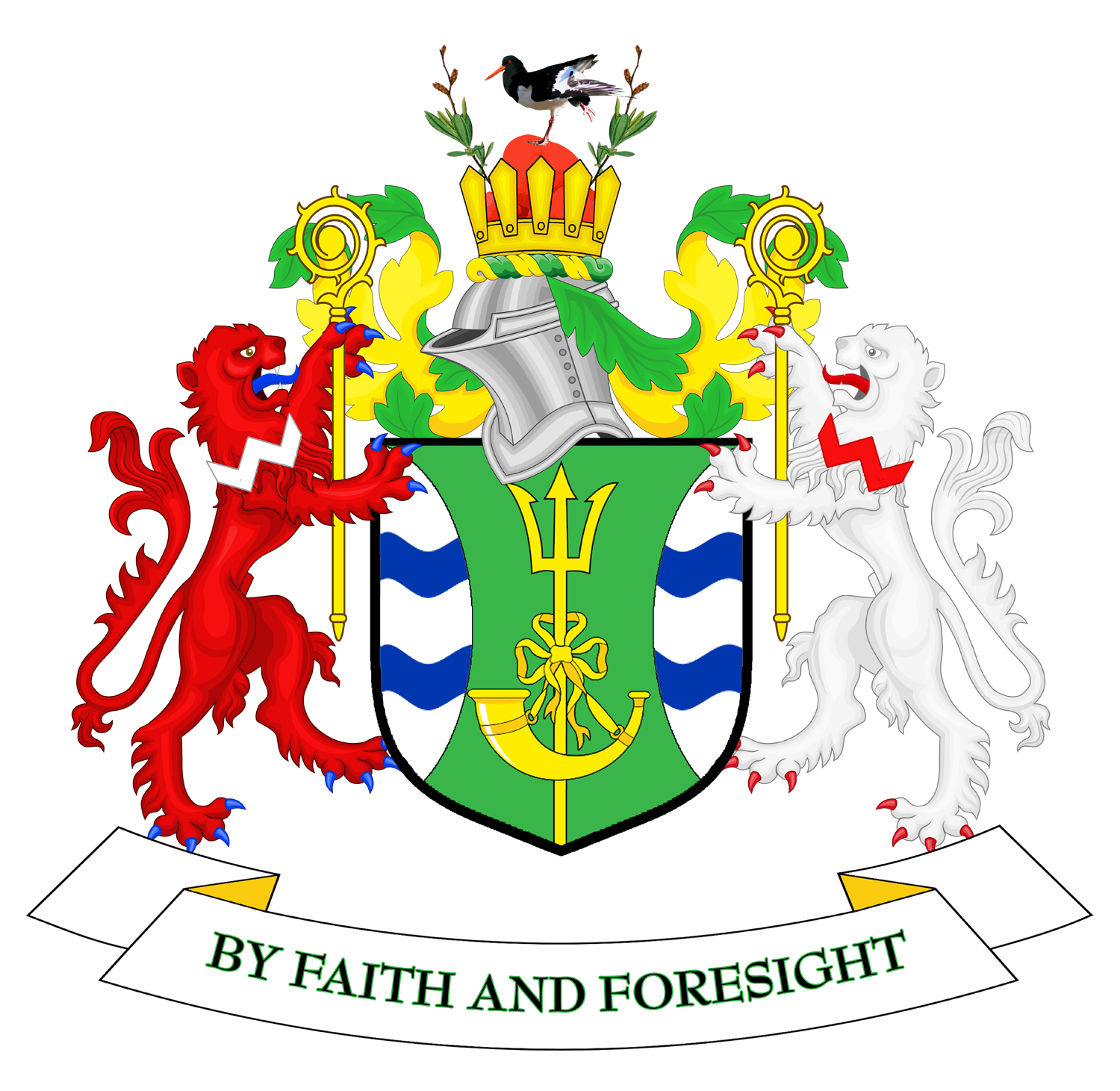
- 4 May 2000; 22 June 2000 (Seacombe)

22 of 66 seats (One Third) to Wirral Metropolitan Borough Council 34 seats needed for a majority
- Turnout: 27.1% (▼0.7%)
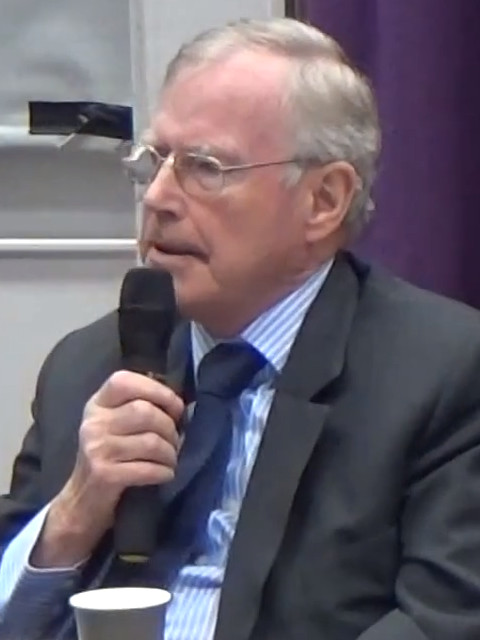

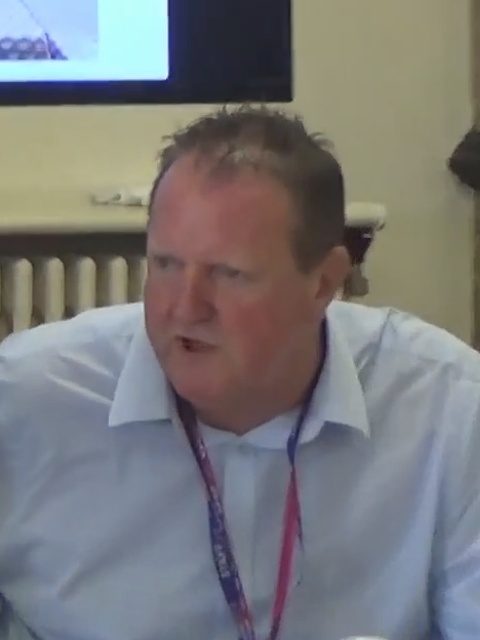

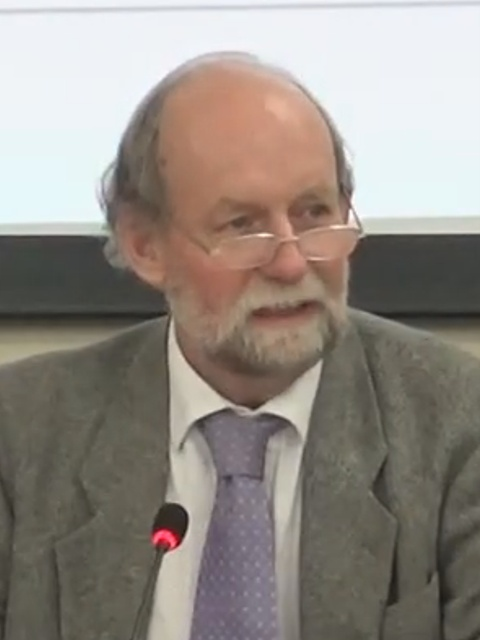
	First party	Second party	Third party
Leader	John Hale	Steve Foulkes	Phil Gilchrist
Party	Conservative	Labour	Liberal Democrats
Leader's seat	Hoylake	Claughton	Eastham
Last election	5 seats, 34.8%	13 seats, 38.4%	4 seats, 23.9%
Seats before	17	39	10
Seats won	9	8	5
Seats after	20	34	12
Seat change	▲3	▼5	▲2
Popular vote	27,238	20,542	17,271
Percentage	40.7%	30.7%	25.8%
Swing	▲5.9%	▼7.7%	▲1.9%
- Map of results of 2000 election
Leader of the Council before election
Dave Jackson
Labour
Leader of the Council after election
Steve Foulkes
Labour

The 2000 Wirral Metropolitan Borough Council election took place on 4 May 2000 to elect members of Wirral Metropolitan Borough Council in England. This election was held on the same day as other local elections.

After the election, the composition of the council was:

Party	Seats	±
Labour	34	▼5
Conservative	20	▲3
Liberal Democrats	12	▲2

== Election results ==
=== Overall election result ===
Overall result compared with 1999.

Wirral Metropolitan Borough Council election results, 2000
Party	Candidates						Votes		
Party	Stood	Elected	Gained	Unseated	Net	% of total	%	No.	Net %
Conservative	22	5	4	1	▲3	40.9	40.7	27,238	▲5.9
Labour	22	8	0	5	▼5	36.4	30.7	20,542	▼7.7
Liberal Democrats	22	5	2	0	▲2	22.7	25.8	17,271	▲1.9
Green	19	0	0	0	Steady	0.0	2.8	1,846	▲0.1

== Ward results ==
=== Bebington ===
Bebington
Party	Candidate	Votes	%	±%
Conservative	Jacqueline Hall	1,712	45.7	▲6.5
Labour	Keith Williams	1,550	41.4	▼6.4
Liberal Democrats	Nigel Dyer	374	10.0	▼0.4
Green	Ann Jones	108	2.9	▲0.3
Majority		162	4.3	N/A
Registered electors		10,923		
Turnout			34.3	▼1.6
Conservative gain from Labour		Swing	▲6.5	

=== Bidston ===
Bidston
Party	Candidate	Votes	%	±%
Labour	James Crabtree	788	73.3	▼8.2
Conservative	Yvonne Sanne	142	13.2	▲5.0
Liberal Democrats	John Tomlinson	113	10.5	▲3.1
Green	Pamela Holstein	32	3.0	Steady
Majority		646	60.1	▼13.2
Registered electors		7,790		
Turnout			13.8	▼2.3
Labour hold		Swing	▼6.6	

=== Birkenhead ===
Birkenhead
Party	Candidate	Votes	%	±%
Labour	Jean Stapleton	1,107	71.3	▼2.8
Conservative	Barbara Poole	184	11.8	▲4.3
Liberal Democrats	Mary Williams	171	11.0	▲1.5
Green	Stuart Harvey	91	5.9	▲2.4
Majority		923	59.4	▼5.2
Registered electors		10,099		
Turnout			15.4	▼2.3
Labour hold		Swing	▼2.6	

=== Bromborough ===
Bromborough
Party	Candidate	Votes	%	±%
Liberal Democrats	Robert Moon	1,390	46.0	▲25.0
Labour	Robert Buckingham	1,080	35.7	▼19.1
Conservative	Ian Mackenzie	475	15.7	▼4.9
Green	Patricia Farmer	78	2.6	▼1.0
Majority		310	10.3	N/A
Registered electors		10,852		
Turnout			27.9	▲2.3
Liberal Democrats gain from Labour		Swing	▲22.1	

=== Clatterbridge ===
Clatterbridge
Party	Candidate	Votes	%	±%
Conservative	Michael Moore	2,126	41.8	▲8.9
Liberal Democrats	Alan Taylor	1,880	37.0	▼1.1
Labour	Audrey Moore	974	19.2	▼7.6
Green	Michael Harper	106	2.1	▼0.1
Majority		246	4.8	N/A
Registered electors		14,044		
Turnout			36.2	▼1.7
Conservative hold		Swing	▲5.0	

=== Claughton ===
Claughton
Party	Candidate	Votes	%	±%
Labour	George Davies	1,324	53.9	▼0.2
Conservative	Patricia Jones	627	25.5	▲5.8
Liberal Democrats	Stephen Blaycock	406	16.5	▼3.8
Green	Elisabeth Heydon	99	4.0	▼1.9
Majority		697	28.4	▼5.4
Registered electors		11,050		
Turnout			22.3	▼1.9
Labour hold		Swing	▼2.7	

=== Eastham ===
Eastham
Party	Candidate	Votes	%	±%
Liberal Democrats	Phillip Gilchrist	2,469	67.9	▲3.9
Conservative	Barbara Green	582	16.0	▲4.1
Labour	Colin Kirwan	542	14.9	▼7.5
Green	Brian Gibbs	41	1.1	▼0.7
Majority		1,887	51.9	▲10.3
Registered electors		11,264		
Turnout			32.3	▲0.4
Liberal Democrats hold		Swing	▲5.2	

=== Egerton ===
Egerton
Party	Candidate	Votes	%	±%
Labour	Andrew Dow	1,063	55.0	▼10.1
Conservative	Cyrus Ferguson	455	23.6	▲7.0
Liberal Democrats	Philip Lloyd	283	14.6	▲4.0
Green	Catherine Page	131	6.8	▼1.0
Majority		608	31.5	▼16.9
Registered electors		10,643		
Turnout			18.2	▼3.0
Labour hold		Swing	▼8.6	

=== Heswall ===
Heswall
Party	Candidate	Votes	%	±%
Conservative	Stephen Rowlands	2,985	71.8	▲3.9
Labour	Albert McCabe	576	13.9	▼3.5
Liberal Democrats	Edward Norton	467	11.2	▼0.7
Green	Garnette Bowler	128	3.1	▲0.3
Majority		2,409	58.0	▲7.4
Registered electors		13,478		
Turnout			30.9	▼1.1
Conservative hold		Swing	▲3.7	

=== Hoylake ===
Hoylake
Party	Candidate	Votes	%	±%
Conservative	Hilary Jones	2,680	68.4	▲1.2
Labour	Alan Milne	570	14.5	▼4.1
Liberal Democrats	Alan Richards	470	12.0	▲1.4
Green	Allen Burton	199	5.1	▲1.5
Majority		2,110	53.8	▲5.2
Registered electors		12,605		
Turnout			31.1	▼2.6
Conservative hold		Swing	▲2.7	

=== Leasowe ===
Leasowe
Party	Candidate	Votes	%	±%
Labour	Ronald Abbey	936	56.6	▼14.8
Conservative	Simon Mountney	436	26.4	▲10.7
Liberal Democrats	Raymond Hayden	281	17.0	▲4.2
Majority		500	30.2	▼25.5
Registered electors		9,390		
Turnout			17.6	▼2.7
Labour hold		Swing	▼12.8	

=== Liscard ===
Liscard
Party	Candidate	Votes	%	±%
Conservative	Alan Robinson	1,185	45.8	▲18.0
Labour	Denis Knowles	1,005	38.8	▼17.3
Liberal Democrats	Richard Ellett	297	11.5	▼4.7
Green	Matthew Adams	101	3.9	New
Majority		180	7.0	N/A
Registered electors		11,135		
Turnout			23.3	▲1.5
Conservative gain from Labour		Swing	▲17.7	

=== Moreton ===
Moreton
Party	Candidate	Votes	%	±%
Conservative	Christopher Blakeley	1,613	55.9	▲11.1
Labour	Ann McLachlan	1,023	35.4	▼11.0
Liberal Democrats	Susanne Uriel	251	8.7	▼0.1
Majority		590	20.4	N/A
Registered electors		9,947		
Turnout			29.1	▲1.1
Conservative gain from Labour		Swing	▲11.1	

=== New Brighton ===
New Brighton
Party	Candidate	Votes	%	±%
Conservative	Anthony Pritchard	1,503	51.4	▲8.8
Labour	John Salter	1,049	35.9	▼8.8
Liberal Democrats	John Codling	264	9.0	▼0.3
Green	George Bowler	108	3.7	▲0.3
Majority		454	15.5	N/A
Registered electors		11,579		
Turnout			25.3	▼1.0
Conservative gain from Labour		Swing	▲8.8	

=== Oxton ===
Oxton
Party	Candidate	Votes	%	±%
Liberal Democrats	Freda Anderson	1,683	56.8	▼9.2
Conservative	Leonard Moore	620	20.9	▲9.0
Labour	John Mitchell	540	18.2	▼0.8
Green	Pamela Mitchell	122	4.1	▲1.0
Majority		1,063	35.9	▼11.1
Registered electors		11,544		
Turnout			25.7	▼2.3
Liberal Democrats hold		Swing	▼5.6	

=== Prenton ===
Prenton
Party	Candidate	Votes	%	±%
Liberal Democrats	Margaret Bridson	1,924	55.5	▲1.2
Conservative	Ian McKellar	843	24.3	▲4.6
Labour	June Williams	633	18.3	▼5.8
Green	John Wilson	68	2.0	Steady
Majority		1,081	31.2	▲1.0
Registered electors		11,659		
Turnout			29.8	▼3.5
Liberal Democrats hold		Swing	▲0.5	

=== Royden ===
Royden
Party	Candidate	Votes	%	±%
Liberal Democrats	Peter Reisdorf	2,507	48.1	▲7.9
Conservative	Derek Robinson	2,203	42.3	▲1.6
Labour	William Ward	420	8.1	▼9.1
Green	Barbara Burton	77	1.5	▼0.4
Majority		304	5.8	N/A
Registered electors		12,914		
Turnout			40.3	▲3.8
Liberal Democrats gain from Conservative		Swing	▲3.2	

=== Seacombe ===
Incumbent councillor for Bromborough and leader of the council Dave Jackson died in April 2000, days before he was due to stand, causing the election to be delayed.

Seacombe
Party	Candidate	Votes	%	±%
Labour	Denis Knowles	1,454	55.4	▼8.2
Liberal Democrats	James Robinson	814	31.0	▲5.0
Conservative	Patricia Jones	331	12.6	▲2.2
Green	Perle Sheldricks	26	1.0	New
Majority		640	24.4	▼13.2
Registered electors		10,728		
Turnout			24.7	▲5.0
Labour hold		Swing	▼6.6	

=== Thurstaston ===
Thurstaston
Party	Candidate	Votes	%	±%
Conservative	David Elderton	2,508	64.0	▲5.3
Labour	David Kean	856	21.9	▼6.5
Liberal Democrats	Charles Wall	408	10.4	▲0.2
Green	Percy Hogg	145	3.7	▲1.0
Majority		1,652	42.2	▲11.9
Registered electors		12,605		
Turnout			31.1	▼0.8
Conservative hold		Swing	▲5.9	

=== Tranmere ===
Tranmere
Party	Candidate	Votes	%	±%
Labour	Moira McLaughlin	893	68.5	▼7.2
Conservative	Susan Bebell	204	15.6	▲7.3
Liberal Democrats	Christopher Teggin	127	9.7	▼0.4
Green	Angela Upton	80	6.1	▲0.1
Majority		689	52.8	▼12.8
Registered electors		9,036		
Turnout			14.5	▼2.3
Labour hold		Swing	▼6.4	

=== Upton ===
Upton
Party	Candidate	Votes	%	±%
Labour	Susan Brown	1,461	49.9	▼5.3
Conservative	Marcus Darby	1,050	35.9	▲6.7
Liberal Democrats	Christopher Beazer	309	10.6	▼2.0
Green	Joyce Hogg	106	3.6	▲0.6
Majority		411	14.0	▼12.0
Registered electors		12,336		
Turnout			23.7	▼1.5
Labour hold		Swing	▼6.0	

=== Wallasey ===
Wallasey
Party	Candidate	Votes	%	±%
Conservative	Kate Wood	2,774	72.0	▲7.3
Labour	Margaret Allen	698	18.1	▼5.2
Liberal Democrats	John Uriel	383	9.9	▲0.7
Majority		2,076	53.9	▲12.5
Registered electors		12,011		
Turnout			32.2	▼1.1
Conservative hold		Swing	▲6.3	

== Changes between 2000 and 2002 ==
Date	Ward	Name	Previous affiliation	New affiliation	Circumstance
December 2001	Egerton	Colin Dow	Labour	Independent	Whip removed.
February 2002	Bebington	Kath Shaughnessy	Labour	Independent	Resigned.

== Notes ==
• italics denote the sitting councillor • bold denotes the winning candidate
