= 1996 Wirral Metropolitan Borough Council election =

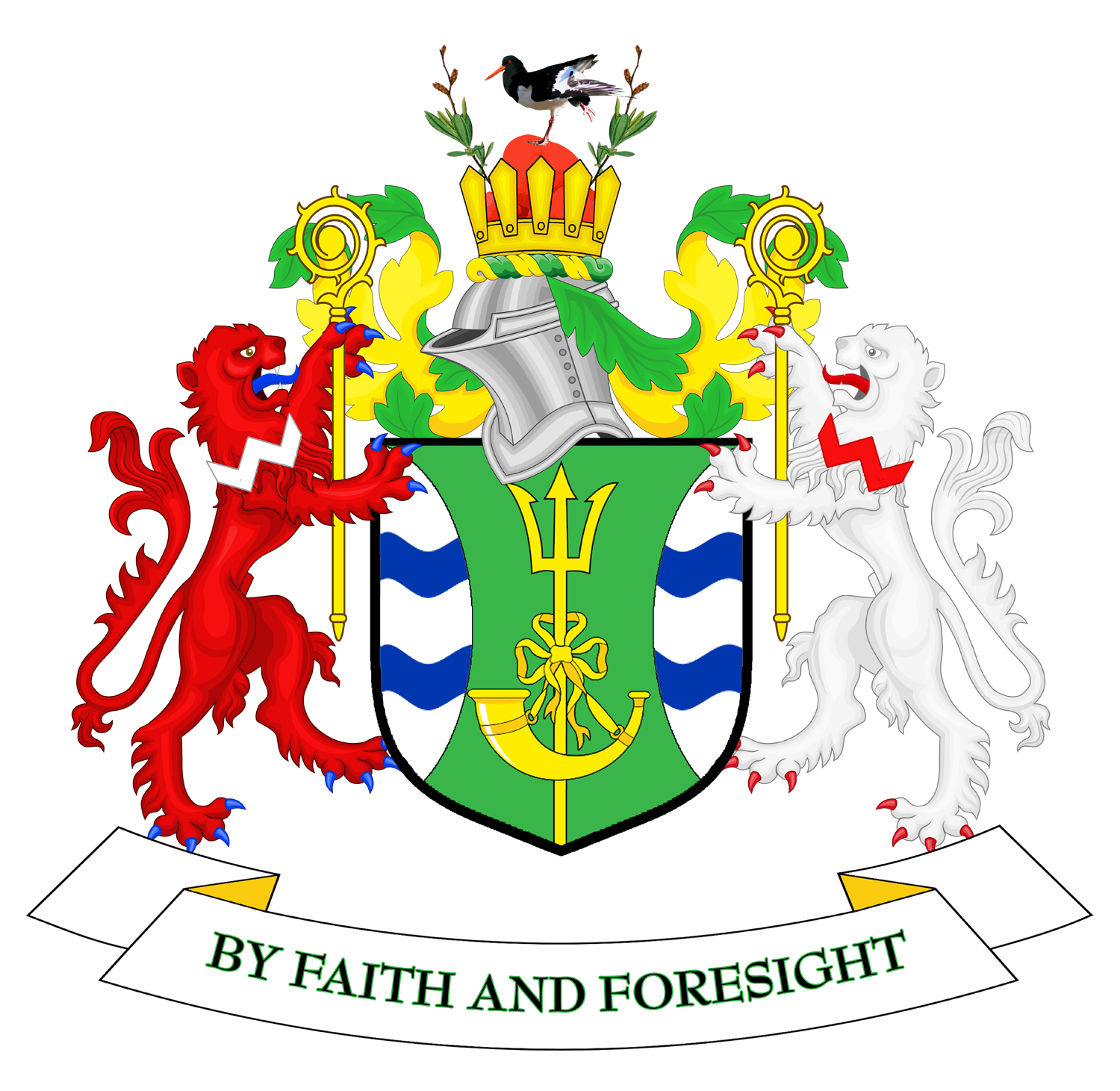
- 2 May 1996

22 of 66 seats (One Third) to Wirral Metropolitan Borough Council 34 seats needed for a majority
- Turnout: 35.0% (▼3.2%)
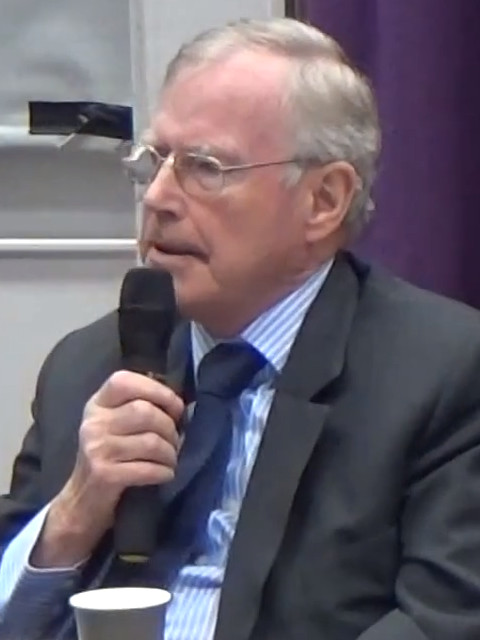

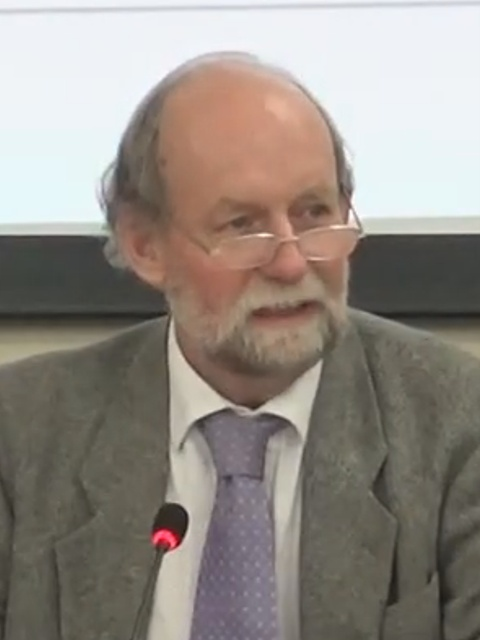
	First party	Second party	Third party
	Lab
Leader	Dave Jackson	John Hale	Phil Gilchrist
Party	Labour	Conservative	Liberal Democrats
Leader's seat	Bromborough	Hoylake	Eastham
Last election	15 seats, 53.5%	4 seats, 25.8%	3 seats, 20.1%
Seats before	36	22	8
Seats won	13	6	3
Seats after	41	16	9
Seat change	▲5	▼6	▲1
Popular vote	41,521	25,611	17,066
Percentage	48.9%	30.2%	20.1%
Swing	▼4.6%	▲4.4%	Steady
- Map of results of 1996 election
Leader of the Council before election
Dave Jackson
Labour
Leader of the Council after election
Dave Jackson
Labour

The 1996 Wirral Metropolitan Borough Council election took place on 2 May 1996 to elect members of Wirral Metropolitan Borough Council in England. This election was held on the same day as other local elections.

After the election, the composition of the council was:

Party	Seats	±
Labour	41	▲5
Conservative	16	▼6
Liberal Democrats	9	▲1

== Election results ==
=== Overall election result ===
Overall result compared with 1995.

Wirral Metropolitan Borough Council election results, 1996
Party	Candidates						Votes		
Party	Stood	Elected	Gained	Unseated	Net	% of total	%	No.	Net %
Labour	22	13	5	0	▲5	59.1	48.9	41,521	▼4.6
Conservative	20	6	0	6	▼6	27.3	30.2	25,611	▲4.4
Liberal Democrats	22	3	1	0	▲1	13.6	20.1	17,066	Steady
Green	6	0	0	0	Steady	0.0	0.7	555	▲0.1
Independent	1	0	0	0	Steady	0.0	0.2	161	N/A

== Ward results ==
=== Bebington ===
Bebington
Party	Candidate	Votes	%	±%
Labour	Keith Williams	2,171	47.7	▼4.9
Conservative	Brian Cummings	1,940	42.6	▲2.5
Liberal Democrats	Kevin Turner	363	8.0	▲0.7
Green	Ann Jones	77	1.7	New
Majority		231	5.1	▼7.4
Registered electors		10,555		
Turnout			43.1	▼4.5
Labour gain from Conservative		Swing	▼3.7	

=== Bidston ===
Bidston
Party	Candidate	Votes	%	±%
Labour	J. Williams	1,713	88.4	▼2.2
Liberal Democrats	John Tomlinson	224	11.6	▲6.8
Majority		1,489	76.9	▼8.9
Registered electors		8,211		
Turnout			23.6	▼7.8
Labour hold		Swing	▼4.5	

=== Birkenhead ===
Birkenhead
Party	Candidate	Votes	%	±%
Labour	D. Gower	2,228	88.0	▼0.3
Liberal Democrats	Michael Redfern	303	12.0	▲5.9
Majority		1,925	76.1	▼6.1
Registered electors		10,211		
Turnout			24.8	▼5.9
Labour hold		Swing	▼3.1	

=== Bromborough ===
Bromborough
Party	Candidate	Votes	%	±%
Labour	David Jackson	2,401	65.1	▼8.1
Conservative	K. Roberts	658	17.9	▲1.7
Liberal Democrats	M. Bolton	384	10.4	▼0.2
Independent	J. Rohan	161	4.4	New
Green	J. Jones	82	2.2	New
Majority		1,743	47.3	▼9.7
Registered electors		10,752		
Turnout			34.3	▼2.0
Labour hold		Swing	▼4.9	

=== Clatterbridge ===
Clatterbridge
Party	Candidate	Votes	%	±%
Conservative	Michael Moore	2,478	45.1	▲7.2
Labour	L. Flanagan	2,066	37.6	▼5.2
Liberal Democrats	W. Walsh	947	17.2	▼2.1
Majority		412	7.5	N/A
Registered electors		13,713		
Turnout			40.0	▼1.5
Conservative hold		Swing	▲6.2	

=== Claughton ===
Claughton
Party	Candidate	Votes	%	±%
Labour	George Davies	2,007	51.7	▲1.9
Liberal Democrats	Stuart Kelly	1,237	31.8	▼5.3
Conservative	P. Greening-Jackson	560	14.4	▲2.9
Green	George Bowler	80	2.1	▲0.5
Majority		770	19.8	▲7.1
Registered electors		10,359		
Turnout			37.5	▼4.3
Labour hold		Swing	▲3.6	

=== Eastham ===
Eastham
Party	Candidate	Votes	%	±%
Liberal Democrats	Phillip Gilchrist	2,805	65.1	▲6.3
Labour	A. McGuiness	1,059	24.6	▼5.2
Conservative	S. Hutchence	444	10.3	▼1.1
Majority		1,746	40.5	▲11.4
Registered electors		11,170		
Turnout			38.6	▼3.1
Liberal Democrats hold		Swing	▲5.8	

=== Egerton ===
Egerton
Party	Candidate	Votes	%	±%
Labour	Andrew Dow	2,290	75.3	▼1.5
Conservative	H. Jackson-Payne	407	13.4	▲1.1
Liberal Democrats	Philip Lloyd	238	7.8	▼0.9
Green	Joyce Hogg	107	3.5	▲1.3
Majority		1,883	61.9	▼2.6
Registered electors		10,554		
Turnout			28.8	▼5.9
Labour hold		Swing	▼1.3	

=== Heswall ===
Heswall
Party	Candidate	Votes	%	±%
Conservative	T. Price	2,820	60.3	▲4.3
Liberal Democrats	Edward Norton	1,040	22.2	▲2.5
Labour	C. Murphy	820	17.5	▼6.8
Majority		1,780	38.0	▲6.2
Registered electors		13,119		
Turnout			35.7	▼2.9
Conservative hold		Swing	▲3.2	

=== Hoylake ===
Hoylake
Party	Candidate	Votes	%	±%
Conservative	Hilary Jones	2,433	55.5	▲2.1
Labour	Alan Milne	1,218	27.8	▼3.5
Liberal Democrats	A. Richards	733	16.7	▲1.4
Majority		1,215	27.7	▲5.6
Registered electors		12,232		
Turnout			35.8	▼2.2
Conservative hold		Swing	▲2.8	

=== Leasowe ===
Leasowe
Party	Candidate	Votes	%	±%
Labour	Ronald Abbey	2,169	77.1	▼4.8
Conservative	Ian Lewis	418	14.8	▲4.7
Liberal Democrats	C. Robertson	228	8.1	▲0.1
Majority		1,751	62.2	▼9.6
Registered electors		9,345		
Turnout			30.1	▼3.6
Labour hold		Swing	▼4.8	

=== Liscard ===
Liscard
Party	Candidate	Votes	%	±%
Labour	Denis Knowles	2,421	64.6	▼7.3
Conservative	M. Ebbs	883	23.6	New
Liberal Democrats	M. Todd	444	11.8	▼16.3
Majority		1,538	41.0	▼2.7
Registered electors		11,087		
Turnout			33.8	▼2.9
Labour gain from Conservative		Swing	▼1.4	

=== Moreton ===
Moreton
Party	Candidate	Votes	%	±%
Labour	Ann McLachlan	2,148	60.5	▲2.1
Conservative	Vic Borg	1,177	33.1	▼1.6
Liberal Democrats	Susanne Uriel	228	6.4	▼0.5
Majority		971	27.3	▲3.6
Registered electors		9,583		
Turnout			37.1	▼7.8
Labour gain from Conservative		Swing	▲1.9	

=== New Brighton ===
New Brighton
Party	Candidate	Votes	%	±%
Labour	Vincent McGee	2,132	59.3	▼3.1
Conservative	H. Tooke	1,038	28.9	▲4.0
Liberal Democrats	John Codling	424	11.8	▼0.9
Majority		1,094	30.4	▼7.1
Registered electors		11,289		
Turnout			31.8	▼4.4
Labour gain from Conservative		Swing	▼3.6	

=== Oxton ===
Oxton
Party	Candidate	Votes	%	±%
Liberal Democrats	Alec Dunn	2,221	56.3	▲3.0
Labour	Pauline Cocker	1,123	28.5	▼2.3
Conservative	Cyrus Ferguson	524	13.3	▼0.8
Green	Garnette Bowler	75	1.9	▲0.2
Majority		1,098	27.8	▲5.3
Registered electors		11,261		
Turnout			35.0	▼4.9
Liberal Democrats hold		Swing	▲2.7	

=== Prenton ===
Prenton
Party	Candidate	Votes	%	±%
Liberal Democrats	Margaret Bridson	2,300	47.8	▲1.6
Labour	Ray Pullen	1,595	33.2	▼2.6
Conservative	J. Thomas	912	19.0	▲1.0
Majority		705	14.7	▲4.3
Registered electors		11,399		
Turnout			42.2	▼1.3
Liberal Democrats gain from Conservative		Swing	▲2.1	

=== Royden ===
Royden
Party	Candidate	Votes	%	±%
Conservative	Derek Robinson	2,280	50.1	▲4.7
Labour	R. Pennington	1,307	28.7	▼3.6
Liberal Democrats	Peter Reisdorf	966	21.2	▲1.2
Majority		973	21.4	▲8.2
Registered electors		10,963		
Turnout			41.5	▲3.9
Conservative hold		Swing	▲4.2	

=== Seacombe ===
Seacombe
Party	Candidate	Votes	%	±%
Labour	P. Clee	2,564	82.7	▼0.8
Liberal Democrats	Moira Gallagher	297	9.6	▲3.9
Conservative	Patricia Jones	240	7.7	▼0.5
Majority		2,267	73.1	▼2.2
Registered electors		10,963		
Turnout			28.3	▼5.6
Labour hold		Swing	▼1.1	

=== Thurstaston ===
Thurstaston (ward)
Party	Candidate	Votes	%	±%
Conservative	Sid Dunn	2,454	51.1	▲4.9
Labour	A. Beer	1,849	38.5	▼1.1
Liberal Democrats	Charles Wall	495	10.3	▼3.9
Majority		605	12.6	▲6.1
Registered electors		12,228		
Turnout			39.1	▲3.0
Conservative hold		Swing	▲3.0	

=== Tranmere ===
Tranmere
Party	Candidate	Votes	%	±%
Labour	Moira McLaughlin	1,824	79.9	▼3.8
Conservative	C. Bowditch	174	7.6	▲1.3
Liberal Democrats	Stephen Blaylock	151	6.6	▲0.5
Green	Catherine Page	134	5.9	▲2.0
Majority		1,650	72.3	▼5.2
Registered electors		9,509		
Turnout			24.0	▼6.3
Labour hold		Swing	▼2.6	

=== Upton ===
Upton
Party	Candidate	Votes	%	±%
Labour	A. Bell	2,579	58.3	▼6.3
Conservative	L. Turnbull	1,350	30.5	▲6.4
Liberal Democrats	N. Sherwen	492	11.1	▼0.2
Majority		1,229	27.8	▼12.8
Registered electors		12,466		
Turnout			35.5	▼2.0
Labour gain from Conservative		Swing	▼6.4	

=== Wallasey ===
Wallasey
Party	Candidate	Votes	%	±%
Conservative	Kate Wood	2,421	50.4	▲10.6
Labour	Geoffrey Caton	1,837	38.2	▼6.4
Liberal Democrats	John Uriel	546	11.4	▼4.2
Majority		584	12.2	N/A
Registered electors		11,690		
Turnout			41.1	▼2.4
Conservative hold		Swing	▲8.5	

== Changes between 1996 and 1998 ==
=== Wallasey by-election 1997 ===
By-election, 13 March 1997: Wallasey
Party	Candidate	Votes	%	±%
Conservative	Lesley Rennie	1,781	47.3	▼3.1
Labour	Elizabeth McArdle	1,490	39.5	▲1.3
Liberal Democrats	John Uriel	443	11.8	▲0.4
Green	George Bowler	54	1.4	New
Majority		291	7.7	▼4.5
Turnout			32.2	▼8.9
Conservative hold		Swing	▼2.2	

=== Other changes ===
Date	Ward	Name	Previous affiliation	New affiliation	Circumstance
?	Prenton	Ed Cunniffe	Liberal Democrats	Ind. Lib Dem	Resigned.

== Notes ==
• italics denote the sitting councillor • bold denotes the winning candidate
