= Clatterbridge (ward) =

Electoral ward in Merseyside, England

Clatterbridge (previously Lower Bebington and Poulton, 1973 to 1979) is a Wirral Metropolitan Borough Council ward in the Wirral South Parliamentary constituency.

== Councillors ==
Election	Councillor (Party)	Councillor (Party)	Councillor (Party)	Ref.
1973	Jackson (Conservative)	Michael Moore (Conservative)	Dorothy Goodfellow (Conservative)	
1975	Jackson (Conservative)	Michael Moore (Conservative)	Dorothy Goodfellow (Conservative)	
1976	Jackson (Conservative)	Michael Moore (Conservative)	Dorothy Goodfellow (Conservative)	
1978	J. Zowe (Conservative)	Michael Moore (Conservative)	Dorothy Goodfellow (Conservative)	
1979	J. Zowe (Conservative)	Michael Moore (Conservative)	Dorothy Goodfellow (Conservative)	
1980	J. Zowe (Conservative)	Michael Moore (Conservative)	Dorothy Goodfellow (Conservative)	
1982	J. Zowe (Conservative)	Michael Moore (Conservative)	Dorothy Goodfellow (Conservative)	
1983	J. Zowe (Conservative)	Michael Moore (Conservative)	Dorothy Goodfellow (Conservative)	
1984	J. Zowe (Conservative)	Michael Moore (Conservative)	Dorothy Goodfellow (Conservative)	
1986	Myrra Lea (Conservative)	Michael Moore (Conservative)	Dorothy Goodfellow (Conservative)	
1987	Myrra Lea (Conservative)	Michael Moore (Conservative)	M. Cureton (Conservative)	
1988	Myrra Lea (Conservative)	Michael Moore (Conservative)	M. Cureton (Conservative)	
1990	Myrra Lea (Conservative)	Michael Moore (Conservative)	M. Cureton (Conservative)	
1991	Myrra Lea (Conservative)	Michael Moore (Conservative)	Leonard Moore (Conservative)	
1992	Myrra Lea (Conservative)	Michael Moore (Conservative)	Leonard Moore (Conservative)	
1994	Myrra Lea (Conservative)	Michael Moore (Conservative)	Leonard Moore (Conservative)	
1995	Myrra Lea (Conservative)	Michael Moore (Conservative)	Audrey Moore (Labour)	
1996	Myrra Lea (Conservative)	Michael Moore (Conservative)	Audrey Moore (Labour)	
1998	Brian Cummings (Conservative)	Michael Moore (Conservative)	Audrey Moore (Labour)	
1999	Brian Cummings (Conservative)	Michael Moore (Conservative)	Isabel Moon (Liberal Democrats/Independent)	
2000	Brian Cummings (Conservative)	Michael Moore (Conservative)	Isabel Moon (Liberal Democrats/Independent)	
2002	Alan Jennings (Liberal Democrats)	Michael Moore (Conservative)	Isabel Moon (Liberal Democrats/Independent)	
2003	Alan Jennings (Liberal Democrats)	Michael Moore (Conservative)	Isabel Moon (Liberal Democrats/Independent)	
2004	Alan Jennings (Liberal Democrats)	Chris Teggin (Liberal Democrats)	Isabel Moon (Liberal Democrats/Independent)	
2006	Alan Jennings (Liberal Democrats)	Chris Teggin (Liberal Democrats)	Isabel Moon (Liberal Democrats/Independent)	
2007	Alan Jennings (Liberal Democrats)	Chris Teggin (Liberal Democrats)	Isabel Moon (Liberal Democrats/Independent)	
2008	Alan Jennings (Liberal Democrats)	Chris Teggin (Liberal Democrats)	Cherry Povall (Conservative)	
2010	Alan Jennings (Liberal Democrats)	Peter Kearney (Conservative)	Cherry Povall (Conservative)	
2011	Adam Sykes (Conservative)	Peter Kearney (Conservative)	Cherry Povall (Conservative)	
2012	Adam Sykes (Conservative)	Peter Kearney (Conservative)	Cherry Povall (Conservative)	
2014	Adam Sykes (Conservative)	Tracey Pilgrim (née Smith) (Conservative)	Cherry Povall (Conservative)	
2015	Adam Sykes (Conservative)	Tracey Pilgrim (née Smith) (Conservative)	Cherry Povall (Conservative)	
2016	Adam Sykes (Conservative)	Tracey Pilgrim (née Smith) (Conservative)	Cherry Povall (Conservative)	
2018	Adam Sykes (Conservative)	Mary Jordan (Conservative)	Cherry Povall (Conservative)	
2019	Helen Cameron (Conservative)	Mary Jordan (Conservative)	Cherry Povall (Conservative)	
2021	Helen Cameron (Conservative)	Mary Jordan (Conservative)	Cherry Povall (Conservative)	
2022	Helen Cameron (Conservative)	Mary Jordan (Conservative)	Cherry Povall (Conservative)	
