= 1973 Wirral Metropolitan Borough Council election =

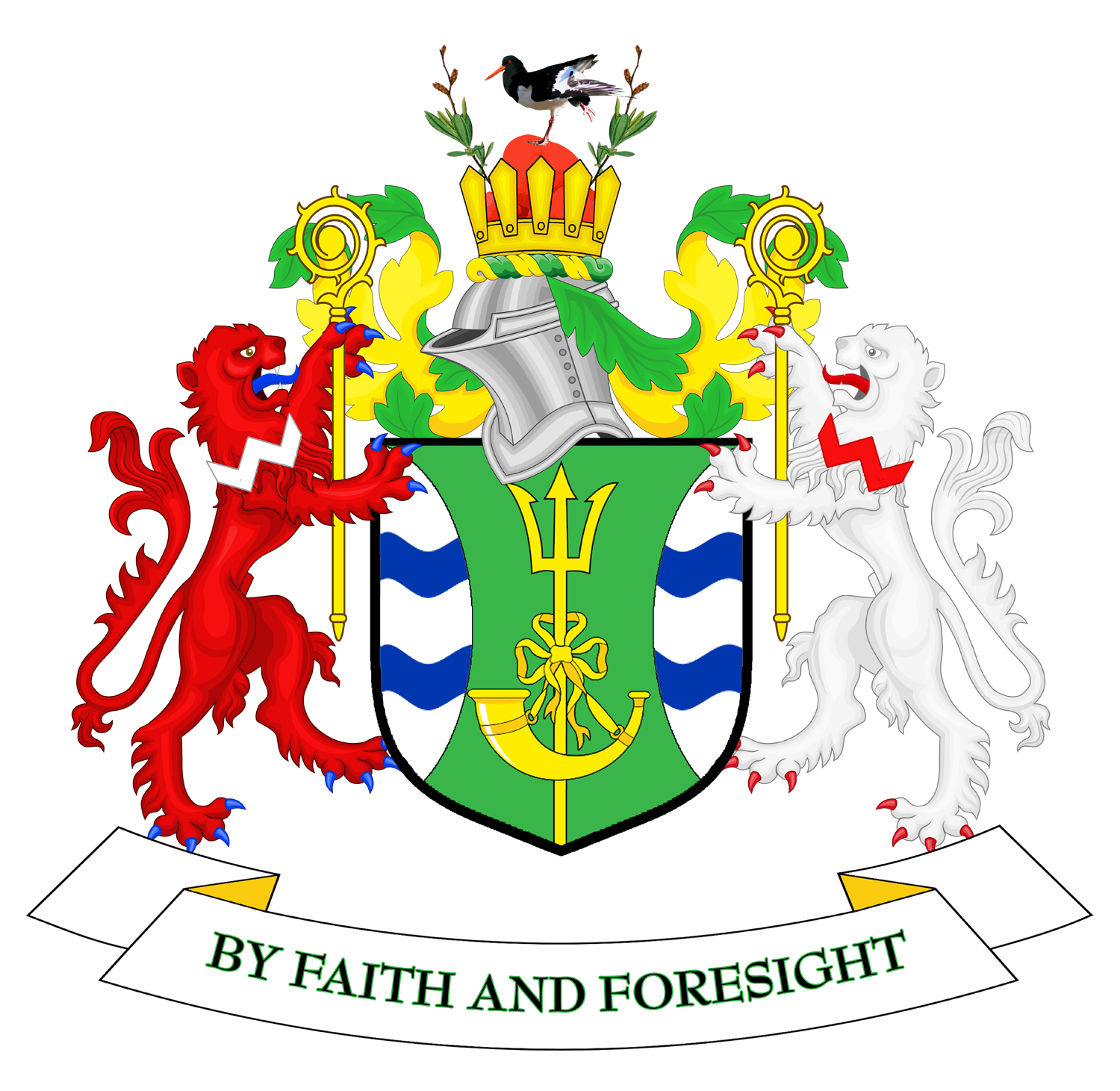
- 10 May 1973

All 66 seats to Wirral Metropolitan Borough Council 34 seats needed for a majority
- Turnout: 41.1%
	First party	Second party	Third party
	Con	Lab
Leader	Bill Whitehurst	Bill Wells	Gruff Evans
Party	Conservative	Labour	Liberal
Leader's seat	Central-Hoose-Meols-Park	Leasowe	Cathcart-Claughton-Cleveland
Seats won	29	24	13
Popular vote	43,847	33,320	23,106
Percentage	42.9%	32.6%	22.6%
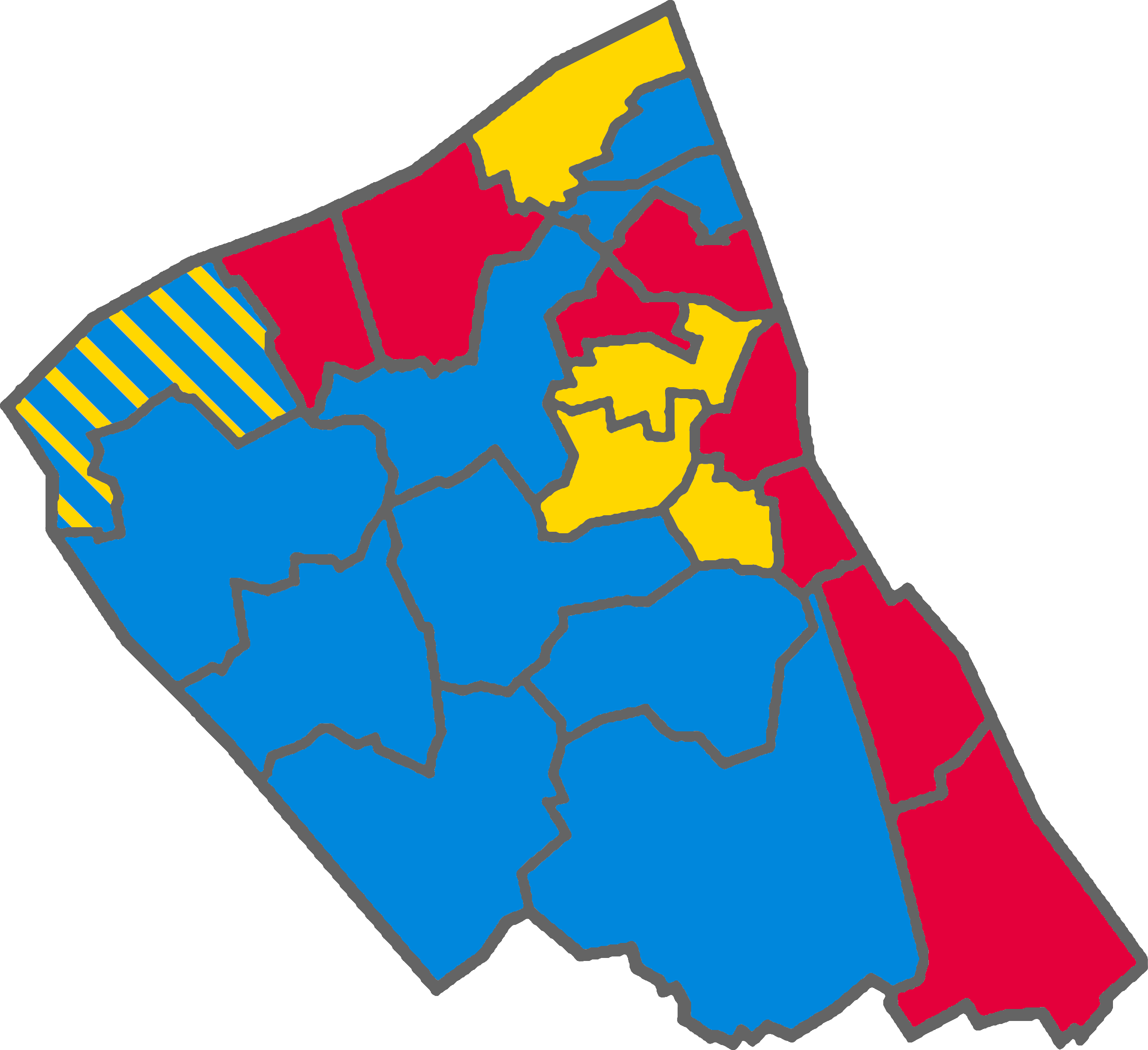
- Map of results of 1973 election
Leader of the Council after election
Bill Whitehurst (Conservative)
No Overall Control

The 1973 Wirral Metropolitan Borough Council election took place on 10 May 1973 to elect members of Wirral Metropolitan Borough Council in England. This was on the same day as other local elections.

The election took place a year before the council formally coming into its powers and prior to the creation of the Metropolitan Borough of Wirral on 1 April 1974 under the Local Government Act 1972, as a merger of the county boroughs of Birkenhead and Wallasey, along with the municipal borough of Bebington and the urban districts of Hoylake and Wirral.

After the election, the composition of the council was:

Party	Seats
Conservative	29
Labour	24
Liberal	13

== Election results ==
=== Overall election result ===
New Council.

Wirral Metropolitan Borough Council election results, 1973
Party	Candidates			Votes	
Party	Stood	Elected	% of total	%	No.
Conservative	66	29	43.9	42.9	43,847
Labour	65	24	36.4	32.6	33,320
Liberal	43	13	19.7	22.6	23,106
Ind. Conservative	2	0	0.0	1.2	1,179
Ind. Socialist	1	0	0.0	0.3	319
Residents	1	0	0.0	0.3	315
Communist	1	0	0.0	0.2	187

== Ward results ==
=== Birkenhead ===
==== No. 1 (Argyle-Clifton-Holt) ====
Argyle-Clifton-Holt
Party	Candidate	Votes	%	±%
Labour	Richard Kimberly (Note: Elected to serve a 5 year term.)	1,580	72.8	N/A
Labour	Parnall (Note: Elected to serve a 3 year term.)	1,577	–	–
Labour	Tomlinson (Note: Elected to serve a 2 year term.)	1,515	–	–
Conservative	L. Peers	589	27.2	N/A
Conservative	Wilson	546	–	–
Conservative	Gates	530	–	–
Majority			45.7	N/A
Registered electors		8,985		
Turnout			24.1	N/A
Labour win (new seat)				
Labour win (new seat)				
Labour win (new seat)				

==== No. 2 (Bebington and Mersey) ====
Bebington and Mersey
Party	Candidate	Votes	%	±%
Labour	S. Kellett	1,358	44.7	N/A
Labour	Bagnall	1,337	–	–
Labour	A. Price	1,159	–	–
Conservative	Jones	1,143	37.7	N/A
Conservative	Welsh	993	–	–
Conservative	Kelly	968	–	–
Liberal	Tomkins	534	17.6	N/A
Liberal	Spencer	511	–	–
Liberal	Prosser	503	–	–
Majority			7.1	N/A
Registered electors		8,707		
Turnout			34.9	N/A
Labour win (new seat)				
Labour win (new seat)				
Labour win (new seat)				

==== No. 3 (Cathcart-Claughton-Cleveland) ====
Cathcart-Claughton-Cleveland
Party	Candidate	Votes	%	±%
Liberal	David Evans	2,444	53.8	N/A
Liberal	John Evans	2,202	–	–
Liberal	A. Jones	2,003	–	–
Conservative	R. Stretch	1,066	23.5	N/A
Conservative	Hesketh	1,064	–	–
Labour	Roberts	1,034	22.8	N/A
Labour	Walter Smith	1,010	–	–
Labour	Keith Rimmer	1,008	–	–
Conservative	Gaughan	970	–	–
Majority			30.3	N/A
Registered electors		9,993		
Turnout			45.5	N/A
Liberal win (new seat)				
Liberal win (new seat)				
Liberal win (new seat)				

==== No. 4 (Devonshire and Egerton) ====
Devonshire and Egerton
Party	Candidate	Votes	%	±%
Liberal	Hughes	2,187	42.3	N/A
Liberal	E. Hughes	1,855	–	–
Liberal	Attwood	1,680	–	–
Conservative	David Fletcher	1,591	30.8	N/A
Conservative	Baker	1,543	–	–
Conservative	K. Allen	1,502	–	–
Labour	Eileen Keegan	1,392	26.9	N/A
Labour	Bagnall	1,253	–	–
Labour	Bagnall	1,225	–	–
Majority			11.5	N/A
Registered electors		12,464		
Turnout			41.5	N/A
Liberal win (new seat)				
Liberal win (new seat)				
Liberal win (new seat)				

==== No. 5 (Gilbrook and St James) ====
Gilbrook and St James
Party	Candidate	Votes	%	±%
Labour	J. Flynn	2,047	59.9	N/A
Labour	J. Roberts	1,996	–	–
Labour	P. Roberts	1,922	–	–
Liberal	A. Hayes	1,044	30.6	N/A
Liberal	Lea	987	–	–
Liberal	Ashman	905	–	–
Conservative	W. Briggs	325	9.5	N/A
Conservative	Menio	305	–	–
Conservative	Emsden	255	–	–
Majority			29.4	N/A
Registered electors		9,030		
Turnout			37.8	N/A
Labour win (new seat)				
Labour win (new seat)				
Labour win (new seat)				

==== No. 6 (Grange and Oxton) ====
Grange and Oxton
Party	Candidate	Votes	%	±%
Liberal	Gordon Lindsay	2,651	50.5	N/A
Liberal	A. Halliday	2,212	–	–
Liberal	Truffet	2,206	–	–
Conservative	Pyke	1,731	33.0	N/A
Conservative	Kenneth Porter	1,697	–	–
Conservative	Lea	1,549	–	–
Labour	Leeper	863	16.5	N/A
Labour	Armstrong	839	–	–
Labour	A. Smith	764	–	–
Majority			17.5	N/A
Registered electors		12,348		
Turnout			42.5	N/A
Liberal win (new seat)				
Liberal win (new seat)				
Liberal win (new seat)				

==== No. 7 (Prenton) ====
Prenton
Party	Candidate	Votes	%	±%
Conservative	M. Baker	2,846	51.7	N/A
Conservative	Harry Deverill	2,820	–	–
Conservative	Pattinson	2,729	–	–
Labour	G. Llewellyn	2,335	42.5	N/A
Labour	Muir	2,244	–	–
Labour	Ainslie	2,142	–	–
Ind. Socialist	Connolly	319	5.8	N/A
Majority			9.3	N/A
Registered electors		15,882		
Turnout			34.6	N/A
Conservative win (new seat)				
Conservative win (new seat)				
Conservative win (new seat)				

==== No. 8 (Upton) ====
Upton
Party	Candidate	Votes	%	±%
Conservative	S. Hibbert	2,691	46.6	N/A
Conservative	Lowe	2,678	–	–
Conservative	J. Roberts	2,654	–	–
Labour	Harland	2,584	44.7	N/A
Labour	Bernard Gilfoyle	2,548	–	–
Labour	Owen	2,375	–	–
Residents	S. Dean	315	5.5	N/A
Communist	K. Thompson	187	3.2	N/A
Majority			1.9	N/A
Registered electors		19,861		
Turnout			29.1	N/A
Conservative win (new seat)				
Conservative win (new seat)				
Conservative win (new seat)				

=== Wallasey ===
==== No. 9 (Leasowe) ====
Leasowe
Party	Candidate	Votes	%	±%
Labour	John Clark	2,129	70.4	N/A
Labour	Bill Wells	2,106	–	–
Labour	Ken Fox	2,062	–	–
Conservative	Ward	896	29.6	N/A
Conservative	Ward	870	–	–
Conservative	Arrowsmith	828	–	–
Majority			40.8	N/A
Registered electors		11,478		
Turnout			26.4	N/A
Labour win (new seat)				
Labour win (new seat)				
Labour win (new seat)				

==== No. 10 (Marlowe-Egremont-South Liscard) ====
Marlowe-Egremont-South Liscard
Party	Candidate	Votes	%	±%
Conservative	S. Morgan	2,147	43.6	N/A
Conservative	M. Ebbs	2,142	–	–
Conservative	Lynn	2,041	–	–
Labour	Gershman	2,028	41.2	N/A
Labour	Vincent McGee	1,985	–	–
Labour	Owens	1,955	–	–
Liberal	Caldwell	751	15.2	N/A
Liberal	Jones	738	–	–
Liberal	Gordon	732	–	–
Majority			2.4	N/A
Registered electors		13,161		
Turnout			37.4	N/A
Conservative win (new seat)				
Conservative win (new seat)				
Conservative win (new seat)				

==== No. 11 (Moreton and Saughall Massie) ====
Moreton and Saughall Massie
Party	Candidate	Votes	%	±%
Labour	Jim Edwards	1,318	47.2	N/A
Labour	G. Watkins	1,288	–	–
Labour	E. Lewis	1,230	–	–
Conservative	I. Walker	1,132	40.5	N/A
Conservative	Webster	1,083	–	–
Conservative	Hale	1,080	–	–
Liberal	E. Lawrence	345	12.3	N/A
Liberal	Coffey	328	–	–
Liberal	Franks	313	–	–
Majority			6.7	N/A
Registered electors		7,070		
Turnout			39.5	N/A
Labour win (new seat)				
Labour win (new seat)				
Labour win (new seat)				

==== No. 12 (New Brighton-Wallasey-Warren) ====
New Brighton-Wallasey-Warren
Party	Candidate	Votes	%	±%
Liberal	N. Thomas	3,153	44.1	N/A
Liberal	Kate Wood	2,946	–	–
Liberal	J. Southworth	2,944	–	–
Conservative	Stubbs	2,848	39.9	N/A
Conservative	Weston	2,818	–	–
Conservative	Shaw	2,812	–	–
Ind. Conservative	John Fishwick	713	10.0	N/A
Labour	Jones	432	6.0	N/A
Labour	Byrne	405	–	–
Labour	Moore	392	–	–
Majority			4.3	N/A
Registered electors		14,680		
Turnout			48.7	N/A
Liberal win (new seat)				
Liberal win (new seat)				
Liberal win (new seat)				

==== No. 13 (North Liscard-Upper Brighton Street) ====
North Liscard-Upper Brighton Street
Party	Candidate	Votes	%	±%
Conservative	Jack Redhead	2,363	41.9	N/A
Conservative	Humphrey-Jones	2,176	–	–
Conservative	George Thornton	2,140	–	–
Liberal	P. Tyrer	1,939	34.4	N/A
Liberal	Wark	1,588	–	–
Liberal	Glover	1,383	–	–
Labour	Williams	872	15.5	N/A
Labour	Pryke	811	–	–
Labour	B. Lloyd	796	–	–
Ind. Conservative	H. Thompson	466	8.3	N/A
Majority			7.5	N/A
Registered electors		11,772		
Turnout			47.9	N/A
Conservative win (new seat)				
Conservative win (new seat)				
Conservative win (new seat)				

==== No. 14 (Seacombe-Poulton-Somerville) ====
Seacombe-Poulton-Somerville
Party	Candidate	Votes	%	±%
Labour	Phoebe Bentzien	2,332	65.8	N/A
Labour	T. Duffy	2,268	–	–
Labour	S. Wickham	2,252	–	–
Conservative	F. Hunter	916	25.9	N/A
Conservative	Bestwick	883	–	–
Conservative	Fielding	772	–	–
Liberal	Cassidy	294	8.3	N/A
Liberal	Hayes	279	–	–
Liberal	Wood	253	–	–
Majority			40.0	N/A
Registered electors		12,430		
Turnout			28.5	N/A
Labour win (new seat)				
Labour win (new seat)				
Labour win (new seat)				

=== Bebington ===
==== No. 15 (Higher Bebington and Woodhey) ====
Higher Bebington and Woodhey
Party	Candidate	Votes	%	±%
Conservative	Frank Theaker	2,458	54.6	N/A
Conservative	Tim Richmond	2,434	–	–
Conservative	E. Pike	2,405	–	–
Labour	Bennett	1,149	25.5	N/A
Labour	M. Irvine	1,145	–	–
Labour	Wingate	1,105	–	–
Liberal	A. Snedker	896	19.9	N/A
Liberal	Duckers	854	–	–
Liberal	Watson	735	–	–
Majority			29.1	N/A
Registered electors		10,262		
Turnout			43.9	N/A
Conservative win (new seat)				
Conservative win (new seat)				
Conservative win (new seat)				

==== No. 16 (Park-New Ferry-North Bromborough) ====
Park-New Ferry-North Bromborough
Party	Candidate	Votes	%	±%
Labour	S. Price	2,575	61.2	N/A
Labour	P. McCarthy	2,384	–	–
Labour	F. Gregory	2,290	–	–
Conservative	McKenzie	1,631	38.8	N/A
Conservative	G. Drew	1,459	–	–
Conservative	Jerram	1,381	–	–
Majority			22.4	N/A
Registered electors		9,804		
Turnout			42.9	N/A
Labour win (new seat)				
Labour win (new seat)				
Labour win (new seat)				

==== No. 17 (South Bromborough and Eastham) ====
South Bromborough and Eastham
Party	Candidate	Votes	%	±%
Labour	Gill	2,469	47.2	N/A
Labour	M. Halliday	2,221	–	–
Labour	William Lungley	2,146	–	–
Conservative	David Allan	1,911	36.5	N/A
Conservative	Howe	1,731	–	–
Conservative	Winter	1,577	–	–
Liberal	Phillip Gilchrist	851	16.3	N/A
Liberal	Astill	741	–	–
Liberal	Harney	728	–	–
Majority			10.7	N/A
Registered electors		12,861		
Turnout			40.7	N/A
Labour win (new seat)				
Labour win (new seat)				
Labour win (new seat)				

==== No. 18 (Lower Bebington and Poulton) ====
Lower Bebington and Poulton
Party	Candidate	Votes	%	±%
Conservative	Jackson	2,498	51.6	N/A
Conservative	Michael Moore	2,472	–	–
Conservative	Dorothy Goodfellow	2,445	–	–
Liberal	Thomas Harney	1,252	25.9	N/A
Liberal	Hughes	1,111	–	–
Labour	A. Radcliffe	1,091	22.5	N/A
Liberal	Thomas	1,085	–	–
Labour	Halliday	987	–	–
Labour	D. Roscoe	974	–	–
Majority			25.7	N/A
Registered electors		12,016		
Turnout			40.3	N/A
Conservative win (new seat)				
Conservative win (new seat)				
Conservative win (new seat)				

=== Hoylake ===
==== No. 19 (Caldy and Frankby) ====
Caldy and Frankby
Party	Candidate	Votes	%	±%
Conservative	W. Lloyd	3,499	76.2	N/A
Conservative	Burrows	3,483	–	–
Conservative	Reg Cumpstey	3,481	–	–
Labour	Kelly	1,092	23.8	N/A
Labour	Pennington	1,082	–	–
Labour	Porter	1,018	–	–
Majority			52.4	N/A
Registered electors		12,685		
Turnout			36.2	N/A
Conservative win (new seat)				
Conservative win (new seat)				
Conservative win (new seat)				

==== No. 20 (Central-Hoose-Meols-Park) ====
Central-Hoose-Meols-Park
Party	Candidate	Votes	%	±%
Conservative	William Whitehurst	3,754	46.5	N/A
Conservative	Frank Jones	3,624	–	–
Liberal	J. Thomas	3,378	41.9	N/A
Conservative	Nightingale	3,373	–	–
Labour	Davies	933	11.6	N/A
Labour	Cook	906	–	–
Majority			4.7	N/A
Registered electors		11,993		
Turnout			67.2	N/A
Conservative win (new seat)				
Conservative win (new seat)				
Liberal win (new seat)				

=== Wirral ===
==== No. 21 (Barnston-Gayton-Heswall-Oldfield) ====
Barnston-Gayton-Heswall-Oldfield
Party	Candidate	Votes	%	±%
Conservative	Harding	3,290	66.1	N/A
Conservative	Clarke	3,123	–	–
Conservative	Crowe	3,107	–	–
Liberal	G. Collins	1,387	27.9	N/A
Liberal	A. Conway	1,349	–	–
Liberal	Wiggans	1,160	–	–
Labour	Garde	302	6.1	N/A
Labour	Ayre	279	–	–
Labour	W. Gamet	264	–	–
Majority			38.2	N/A
Registered electors		11,022		
Turnout			45.2	N/A
Conservative win (new seat)				
Conservative win (new seat)				
Conservative win (new seat)				

==== No. 22 (Irby-Pensby-Thurstaston) ====
Irby-Pensby-Thurstaston
Party	Candidate	Votes	%	±%
Conservative	Doris Sisson	2,522	64.2	N/A
Conservative	Birks	2,519	–	–
Conservative	Ford	2,469	–	–
Labour	S. Dunn	1,405	35.8	N/A
Labour	H. Ellis-Thomas	1,361	–	–
Labour	Cody	1,304	–	–
Majority			28.4	N/A
Registered electors		9,147		
Turnout			42.9	N/A
Conservative win (new seat)				
Conservative win (new seat)				
Conservative win (new seat)				

== Notes ==
• bold denotes the winning candidate
