= Egerton (ward) =

Electoral ward of Wirral, England

Egerton (previously Devonshire and Egerton, 1973 to 1979) was a Wirral Metropolitan Borough Council ward in the Birkenhead Parliamentary constituency.

It was abolished in 2004, being absorbed into the Bebington, Birkenhead and Tranmere, Prenton and Rock Ferry wards.

== Councillors ==
Election	Councillor (Party)	Councillor (Party)	Councillor (Party)	Ref.
1973	Hughes (Liberal)	E. Hughes (Liberal)	Attwood (Liberal)	
1975	Hughes (Liberal)	E. Hughes (Liberal)	K. Allen (Conservative)	
1976	Hughes (Liberal)	J. Lee (Conservative)	K. Allen (Conservative)	
1978	Myrra Lea (Conservative)	E. Williams (Conservative)	K. Allen (Conservative)	
1979	Myrra Lea (Conservative)	E. Williams (Conservative)	Ronald Leaper (Labour)	
1980	Myrra Lea (Conservative)	R. McGenity (Labour)	Ronald Leaper (Labour)	
1982	Alec Dunn (Labour)	R. McGenity (Labour)	Ronald Leaper (Labour)	
1983	Alec Dunn (Labour)	R. McGenity (Labour)	Walter Smith (Labour)	
1984	Alec Dunn (Labour)	R. McGenity (Labour)	Walter Smith (Labour)	
1986	P. Williams (Labour)	R. McGenity (Labour)	Walter Smith (Labour)	
1987	P. Williams (Labour)	R. McGenity (Labour)	Walter Smith (Labour)	
1988	P. Williams (Labour)	Alec Dunn (Labour/Independent/Liberal Democrats)	Walter Smith (Labour)	
1990	P. Williams (Labour)	Alec Dunn (Labour/Independent/Liberal Democrats)	Walter Smith (Labour)	
1991	P. Williams (Labour)	Alec Dunn (Labour/Independent/Liberal Democrats)	Walter Smith (Labour)	
1992	P. Williams (Labour)	Colin Dow (Labour/Independent/WIN)	Walter Smith (Labour)	
1994	Barney Gilfoyle (Labour)	Colin Dow (Labour/Independent/WIN)	Walter Smith (Labour)	
1995	Barney Gilfoyle (Labour)	Colin Dow (Labour/Independent/WIN)	Walter Smith (Labour)	
1996	Barney Gilfoyle (Labour)	Colin Dow (Labour/Independent/WIN)	Walter Smith (Labour)	
1998	Barney Gilfoyle (Labour)	Colin Dow (Labour/Independent/WIN)	Walter Smith (Labour)	
1999	Barney Gilfoyle (Labour)	Colin Dow (Labour/Independent/WIN)	Walter Smith (Labour)	
2000	Barney Gilfoyle (Labour)	Colin Dow (Labour/Independent/WIN)	Walter Smith (Labour)	
2002	Jerry Williams (Labour)	Colin Dow (Labour/Independent/WIN)	Walter Smith (Labour)	
2003	Jerry Williams (Labour)	Colin Dow (Labour/Independent/WIN)	Walter Smith (Labour)	
