= 1995 Wirral Metropolitan Borough Council election =

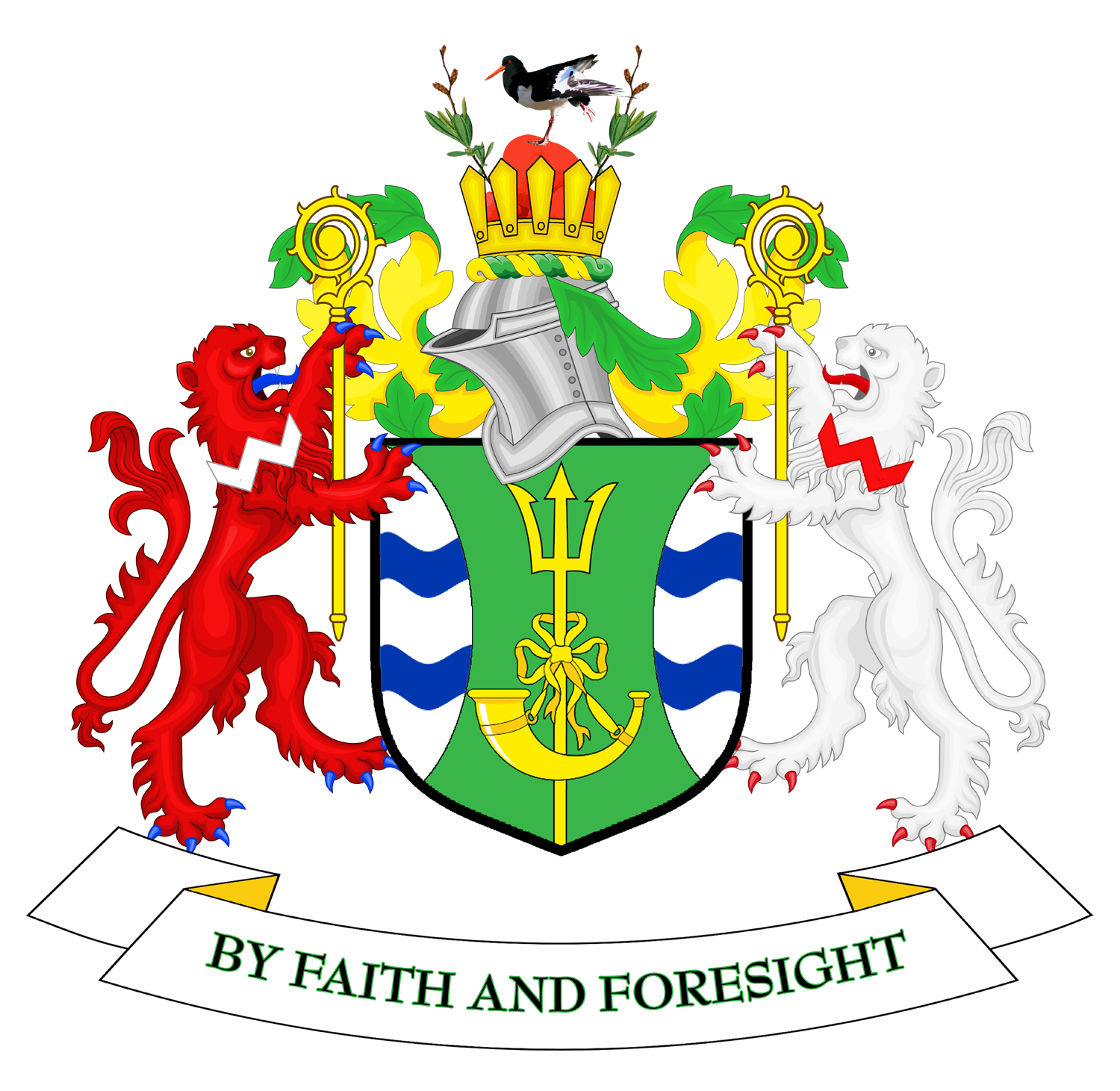
- 4 May 1995

22 of 66 seats (One Third) to Wirral Metropolitan Borough Council 34 seats needed for a majority
- Turnout: 38.2% (▼4.8%)
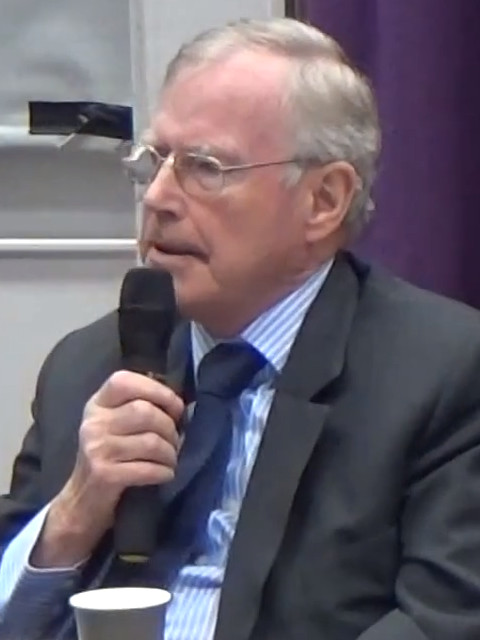

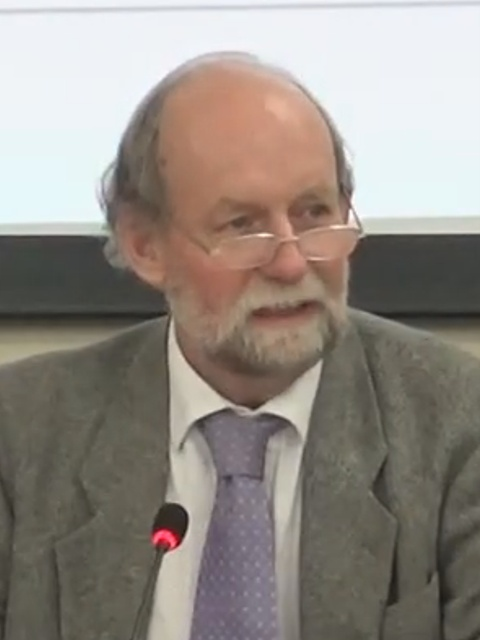
	First party	Second party	Third party
	Lab
Leader	Dave Jackson	John Hale	Phil Gilchrist
Party	Labour	Conservative	Liberal Democrats
Leader's seat	Bromborough	Hoylake	Eastham
Last election	15 seats, 46.6%	6 seats, 30.8%	3 seats, 22.5%
Seats before	30	28	8
Seats won	15	4	3
Seats after	36	22	8
Seat change	▲6	▼6	Steady
Popular vote	51,052	24,550	19,179
Percentage	53.5%	25.8%	20.1%
Swing	▲6.9%	▼5.0%	▼2.4%
- Map of results of 1995 election
Leader of the Council before election
None
No Overall Control
Leader of the Council after election
Dave Jackson
Labour

The 1995 Wirral Metropolitan Borough Council election took place on 4 May 1995 to elect members of Wirral Metropolitan Borough Council in England. This election was held on the same day as other local elections.

After the election, the composition of the council was:

Party	Seats	±
Labour	36	▲6
Conservative	22	▼6
Liberal Democrats	8	Steady

== Election results ==
=== Overall election result ===
Overall result compared with 1994.

Wirral Metropolitan Borough Council election results, 1995
Party	Candidates						Votes		
Party	Stood	Elected	Gained	Unseated	Net	% of total	%	No.	Net %
Labour	22	15	6	0	▲6	68.2	53.5	51,052	▲6.9
Conservative	21	4	0	6	▼6	18.2	25.8	24,550	▼5.0
Liberal Democrats	22	3	1	1	Steady	13.6	20.1	19,179	▼2.4
Green	6	0	0	0	Steady	0.0	0.6	558	▲0.5

== Ward results ==
=== Bebington ===
Bebington
Party	Candidate	Votes	%	±%
Labour	Patrick Smith	2,685	52.6	▲9.3
Conservative	Hilary Jones	2,045	40.1	▼1.3
Liberal Democrats	Kevin Turner	375	7.3	▼8.0
Majority		640	12.5	▲10.6
Registered electors		10,735		
Turnout			47.6	▼2.4
Labour gain from Conservative		Swing	▲5.3	

=== Bidston ===
Bidston
Party	Candidate	Votes	%	±%
Labour	Harry Smith	2,401	90.6	▲6.8
Liberal Democrats	John Tomlinson	128	4.8	▼4.6
Conservative	P. Weare	121	4.6	▼2.3
Majority		2,273	85.8	▲11.4
Registered electors		8,446		
Turnout			31.4	▼0.7
Labour hold		Swing	▲5.7	

=== Birkenhead ===
Birkenhead
Party	Candidate	Votes	%	±%
Labour	Phillip Davies	2,850	88.3	▲3.9
Liberal Democrats	P. Cooke	196	6.1	▼2.1
Conservative	B. Brassey	183	5.7	▼1.6
Majority		2,654	82.2	▲6.0
Registered electors		10,508		
Turnout			30.7	▼4.2
Labour hold		Swing	▲3.0	

=== Bromborough ===
Bromborough
Party	Candidate	Votes	%	±%
Labour	R. Mullins	2,950	73.2	▲11.6
Conservative	K. Roberts	653	16.2	▼5.3
Liberal Democrats	M. Bolton	427	10.6	▼6.3
Majority		2,297	57.0	▲16.9
Registered electors		11,102		
Turnout			36.3	▼4.5
Labour hold		Swing	▲8.5	

=== Clatterbridge ===
Clatterbridge
Party	Candidate	Votes	%	±%
Labour	Audrey Moore	2,486	42.8	▲11.3
Conservative	Leonard Moore	2,201	37.9	▼5.6
Liberal Democrats	W. Walsh	1,119	19.3	▼5.8
Majority		285	4.9	N/A
Registered electors		13,974		
Turnout			41.5	▼3.9
Labour gain from Conservative		Swing	▲8.5	

=== Claughton ===
Claughton
Party	Candidate	Votes	%	±%
Labour	Andrew Day	2,205	49.8	▼3.5
Liberal Democrats	Stuart Kelly	1,644	37.1	▲4.7
Conservative	P. Greening-Jackson	509	11.5	▼2.8
Green	K. Cuthbertson	73	1.6	New
Majority		561	12.7	▼8.1
Registered electors		10,607		
Turnout			41.8	▼4.6
Labour gain from Liberal Democrats		Swing	▼4.1	

=== Eastham ===
Eastham
Party	Candidate	Votes	%	±%
Liberal Democrats	George Mitchell	2,782	58.8	▲4.5
Labour	A. Sheppard	1,407	29.8	▼1.9
Conservative	D. Jones	539	11.4	▼2.6
Majority		1,375	29.1	▲6.5
Registered electors		11,345		
Turnout			41.7	▼6.3
Liberal Democrats hold		Swing	▲3.2	

=== Egerton ===
Egerton
Party	Candidate	Votes	%	±%
Labour	Walter Smith	2,884	76.8	▲5.1
Conservative	M. Vickers	461	12.3	▼3.9
Liberal Democrats	D. Roberts	327	8.7	▼3.4
Green	Joyce Hogg	82	2.2	New
Majority		2,423	64.5	▲9.0
Registered electors		10,832		
Turnout			34.7	▼4.9
Labour hold		Swing	▲4.5	

=== Heswall ===
Heswall
Party	Candidate	Votes	%	±%
Conservative	Peter Johnson	2,874	56.0	▼2.0
Labour	L. Flanagan	1,244	24.3	▲7.6
Liberal Democrats	Edward Norton	1,011	19.7	▼5.6
Majority		1,630	31.8	▼0.9
Registered electors		13,295		
Turnout			38.6	▼3.7
Conservative hold		Swing	▼0.5	

=== Hoylake ===
Hoylake
Party	Candidate	Votes	%	±%
Conservative	John Hale	2,544	53.4	▼4.2
Labour	Pauline Cocker	1,490	31.3	▲11.2
Liberal Democrats	A. Richards	731	15.3	▼7.0
Majority		1,054	22.1	▼13.1
Registered electors		12,544		
Turnout			38.0	▼4.0
Conservative hold		Swing	▼6.6	

=== Leasowe ===
Leasowe
Party	Candidate	Votes	%	±%
Labour	Ernest Prout	2,641	81.9	▲10.2
Conservative	H. Tooke	326	10.1	▼7.0
Liberal Democrats	Susanne Uriel	259	8.0	▼3.2
Majority		2,315	71.8	▲17.2
Registered electors		9,581		
Turnout			33.7	▼2.0
Labour hold		Swing	▲8.6	

=== Liscard ===
Liscard
Party	Candidate	Votes	%	±%
Labour	John Cocker	2,985	71.9	▲10.9
Liberal Democrats	M. Todd	1,169	28.1	▲16.1
Majority		1,816	43.7	▲9.6
Registered electors		11,324		
Turnout			36.7	▼7.1
Labour hold		Swing	▲4.9	

=== Moreton ===
Moreton
Party	Candidate	Votes	%	±%
Labour	Margaret Green	2,534	58.4	▲0.9
Conservative	Ann Dishman	1,506	34.7	▲1.0
Liberal Democrats	C. Robertson	300	6.9	▼1.9
Majority		1,028	23.7	▼0.1
Registered electors		9,662		
Turnout			44.9	▼5.2
Labour gain from Conservative		Swing	▼0.1	

=== New Brighton ===
New Brighton
Party	Candidate	Votes	%	±%
Labour	Mike Keenan	2,608	62.4	▲11.2
Conservative	Vera Ruck	1,042	24.9	▼7.3
Liberal Democrats	John Codling	531	12.7	▼3.2
Majority		1,566	35.7	▲18.5
Registered electors		11,563		
Turnout			36.2	▼8.0
Labour gain from Conservative		Swing	▲9.3	

=== Oxton ===
Oxton
Party	Candidate	Votes	%	±%
Liberal Democrats	Patricia Williams	2,473	53.3	▼5.3
Labour	Denis Knowles	1,428	30.8	▲5.2
Conservative	Cyrus Ferguson	655	14.1	▼1.7
Green	Garnette Bowler	80	1.7	New
Majority		1,045	22.5	▼10.6
Registered electors		11,613		
Turnout			39.9	▼4.6
Liberal Democrats hold		Swing	▼5.3	

=== Prenton ===
Prenton
Party	Candidate	Votes	%	±%
Liberal Democrats	Edward Cunniffe	2,360	46.2	▼4.1
Labour	Keith Williams	1,828	35.8	▲10.3
Conservative	A. Adams (Note: Incumbent councillor for New Brighton ward.)	919	18.0	▼6.1
Majority		532	10.4	▼14.4
Registered electors		11,752		
Turnout			43.5	▼11.5
Liberal Democrats gain from Conservative		Swing	▼7.2	

=== Royden ===
Royden
Party	Candidate	Votes	%	±%
Conservative	C. Kevan	2,161	45.4	▼5.8
Labour	R. Pennington	1,534	32.3	▲6.8
Liberal Democrats	Peter Reisdorf	952	20.0	▼3.3
Green	Cecil Bowler	108	2.3	New
Majority		627	13.2	▼12.5
Registered electors		12,638		
Turnout			37.6	▼3.8
Conservative hold		Swing	▼6.3	

=== Seacombe ===
Seacombe
Party	Candidate	Votes	%	±%
Labour	Adrian Jones	3,200	83.5	▲4.4
Conservative	Patricia Jones	315	8.2	▼3.4
Liberal Democrats	M. Wright	219	5.7	▼3.6
Green	M. Godwin	99	2.6	New
Majority		2,885	75.3	▲7.8
Registered electors		11,321		
Turnout			33.9	▼4.9
Labour hold		Swing	▲3.9	

=== Thurstaston ===
Thurstaston
Party	Candidate	Votes	%	±%
Conservative	Jeffrey Green	2,084	46.2	▼14.0
Labour	A. Bell	1,789	39.6	▼0.2
Liberal Democrats	Charles Wall	641	14.2	New
Majority		295	6.5	▼14.0
Registered electors		12,510		
Turnout			36.1	▼4.1
Conservative hold		Swing	▼6.9	

=== Tranmere ===
Tranmere
Party	Candidate	Votes	%	±%
Labour	Christine Meaden	2,478	83.7	▲2.6
Conservative	H. Jackson-Payne	185	6.3	▼0.8
Liberal Democrats	Stephen Blaylock	181	6.1	▼1.8
Green	Nigel Birchenough	116	3.9	Steady
Majority		2,293	77.5	▲4.4
Registered electors		9,762		
Turnout			30.3	▼4.6
Labour hold		Swing	▲2.1	

=== Upton ===
Upton
Party	Candidate	Votes	%	±%
Labour	Peter Corcoran	3,109	64.6	▲10.7
Conservative	D. Smith	1,157	24.1	▼6.5
Liberal Democrats	E. Davies	543	11.3	▼4.2
Majority		1,952	40.6	▲17.3
Registered electors		12,810		
Turnout			37.5	▼7.6
Labour hold		Swing	▲8.6	

=== Wallasey ===
Wallasey
Party	Candidate	Votes	%	±%
Labour	Melanie Iredale	2,316	44.6	▲13.6
Conservative	Lesley Rennie (Note: Incumbent councillor for Prenton ward.)	2,070	39.8	▼4.5
Liberal Democrats	John Uriel	811	15.6	▼9.1
Majority		246	4.7	N/A
Registered electors		11,943		
Turnout			43.5	▼3.0
Labour gain from Conservative		Swing	▲9.1	

== Notes ==
• italics denote the sitting councillor • bold denotes the winning candidate
