= 1999 Wirral Metropolitan Borough Council election =

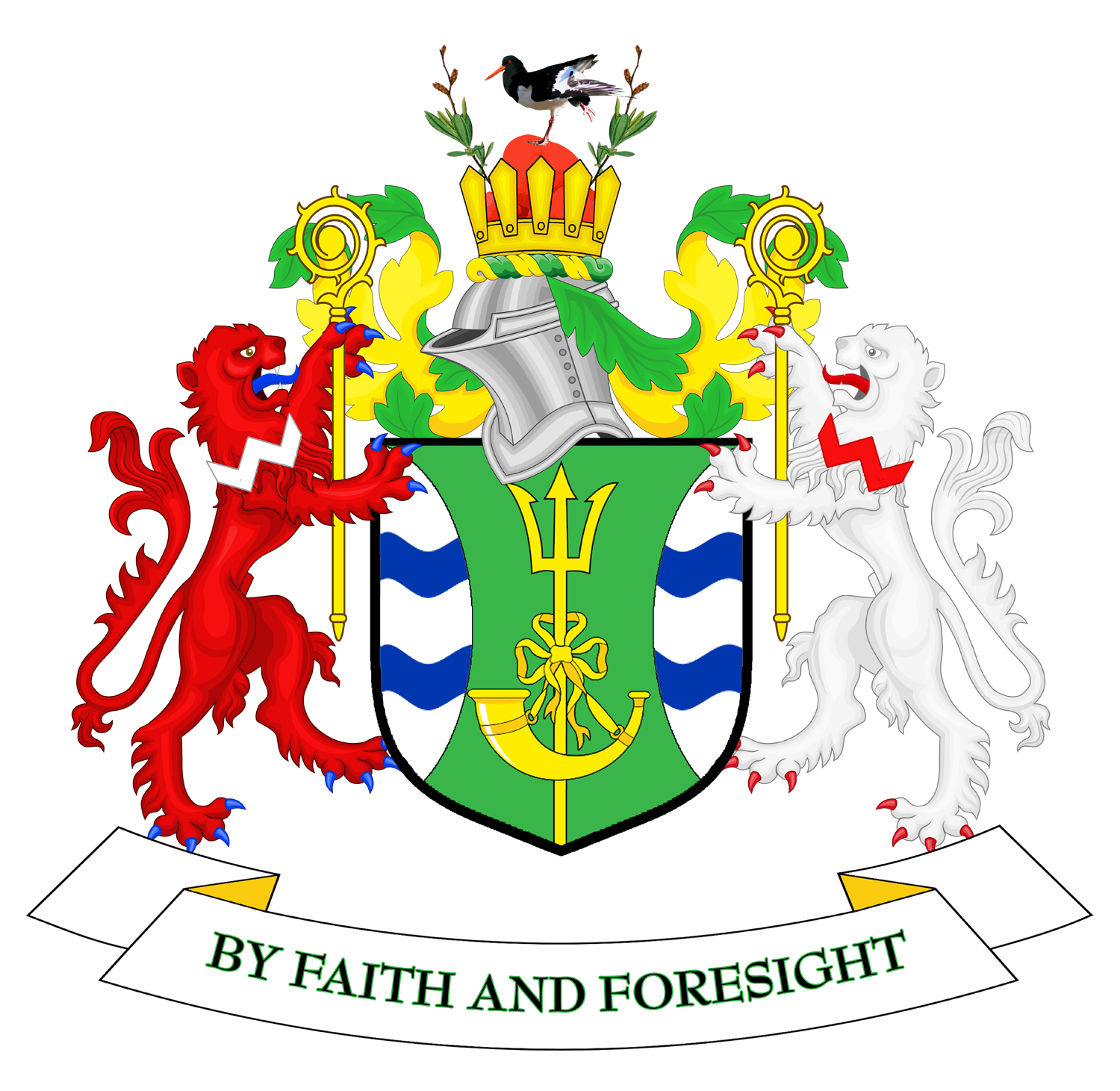
- 6 May 1999

22 of 66 seats (One Third) to Wirral Metropolitan Borough Council 34 seats needed for a majority
- Turnout: 27.8% (▼0.3%)
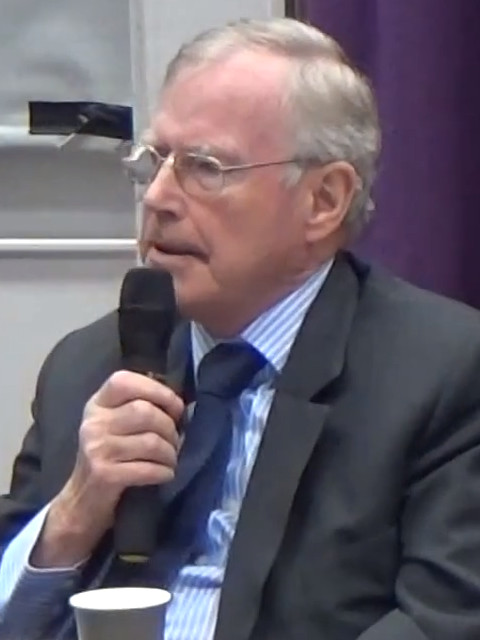

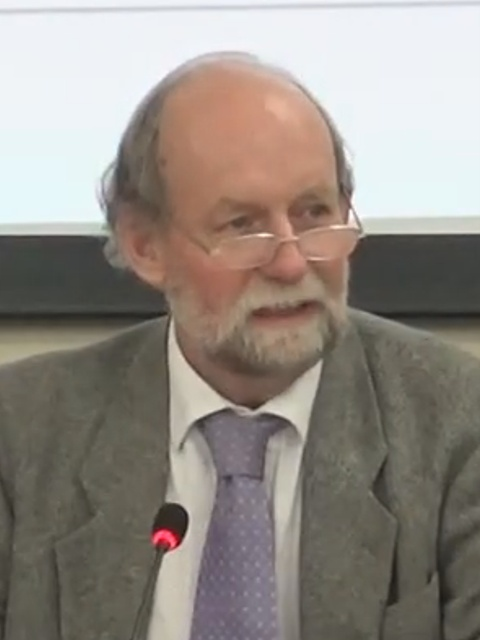
	First party	Second party	Third party
	Lab
Leader	Dave Jackson	John Hale	Phil Gilchrist
Party	Labour	Conservative	Liberal Democrats
Leader's seat	Bromborough	Hoylake	Eastham
Last election	13 seats, 42.1%	7 seats, 33.1%	4 seats, 21.4%
Seats before	42	16	8
Seats won	13	5	4
Seats after	39	17	10
Seat change	▼3	▲1	▲2
Popular vote	26,142	23,675	16,295
Percentage	38.4%	34.8%	23.9%
Swing	▼3.7%	▲1.7%	▲2.5%
- Map of results of 1999 election
Leader of the Council before election
Dave Jackson
Labour
Leader of the Council after election
Dave Jackson
Labour

The 1999 Wirral Metropolitan Borough Council election took place on 6 May 1999 to elect members of Wirral Metropolitan Borough Council in England. This election was held on the same day as other local elections.

After the election, the composition of the council was:

Party	Seats	±
Labour	39	▼3
Conservative	17	▲1
Liberal Democrats	10	▲2

== Election results ==
=== Overall election result ===
Overall result compared with 1998.

Wirral Metropolitan Borough Council election results, 1999
Party	Candidates						Votes		
Party	Stood	Elected	Gained	Unseated	Net	% of total	%	No.	Net %
Labour	22	13	0	3	▼3	59.1	38.4	26,142	▼3.7
Conservative	22	5	1	0	▲1	22.7	34.8	23,675	▲1.7
Liberal Democrats	22	4	2	0	▲2	18.2	23.9	16,295	▲2.5
Green	18	0	0	0	Steady	0.0	2.7	1,834	▼0.1
Socialist Labour	1	0	0	0	Steady	0.0	0.1	94	▼0.5

== Ward results ==
=== Bebington ===
Bebington
Party	Candidate	Votes	%	±%
Labour	Patrick Smith	1,846	47.8	▲1.0
Conservative	Jacqueline Hall	1,511	39.2	▼3.4
Liberal Democrats	Nigel Dyer	402	10.4	▲2.3
Green	Ann Jones	99	2.6	▲0.1
Majority		335	8.7	▲4.4
Registered electors		10,736		
Turnout			35.9	▼2.8
Labour hold		Swing	▲2.2	

=== Bidston ===
Bidston
Party	Candidate	Votes	%	±%
Labour	Harry Smith	1,049	81.5	▲9.0
Conservative	Doreen Pike	105	8.2	New
Liberal Democrats	John Tomlinson	95	7.4	▼3.7
Green	Robert Mitchell	38	3.0	▼0.2
Majority		944	73.3	▲14.0
Registered electors		7,967		
Turnout			16.1	▼1.3
Labour hold		Swing	▲7.0	

=== Birkenhead ===
Birkenhead
Party	Candidate	Votes	%	±%
Labour	Phillip Davies	1,298	74.1	▼5.0
Liberal Democrats	Mary Williams	166	9.5	▼11.4
Conservative	Susan Bebell	132	7.5	New
Socialist Labour	Alec McFadden	94	5.4	New
Green	Stuart Harvey	62	3.5	New
Majority		1,132	64.6	▲6.4
Registered electors		9,887		
Turnout			17.7	▲0.4
Labour hold		Swing	▲3.2	

=== Bromborough ===
Bromborough
Party	Candidate	Votes	%	±%
Labour	Anna McLaughlin	1,504	54.8	▼5.0
Liberal Democrats	Robert Moon	578	21.0	▲6.9
Conservative	Ian Mackenzie	565	20.6	▼1.4
Green	J. Jones	99	3.6	▼0.5
Majority		926	33.7	▼4.1
Registered electors		10,720		
Turnout			25.6	▼1.8
Labour hold		Swing	▼2.0	

=== Clatterbridge ===
Clatterbridge
Party	Candidate	Votes	%	±%
Liberal Democrats	Isabel Moon	2,011	38.1	▲21.7
Conservative	Mary Jordan	1,735	32.9	▼15.6
Labour	Audrey Moore	1,417	26.8	▼5.9
Green	Michael Harper	116	2.2	▼0.2
Majority		276	5.2	N/A
Registered electors		13,936		
Turnout			37.9	▲2.9
Liberal Democrats gain from Labour		Swing	▲10.5	

=== Claughton ===
Claughton
Party	Candidate	Votes	%	±%
Labour	Denise Roberts	1,406	54.1	▼1.7
Liberal Democrats	Stephen Blaycock	527	20.3	▼1.9
Conservative	Barbara Brassey	512	19.7	▲3.8
Green	Elisabeth Heydon	153	5.9	▲3.2
Majority		879	33.8	▲0.2
Registered electors		10,725		
Turnout			24.2	▼2.7
Labour hold		Swing	▲0.1	

=== Eastham ===
Eastham
Party	Candidate	Votes	%	±%
Liberal Democrats	George Mitchell	2,278	64.0	▲1.8
Labour	S. Blair	796	22.4	▼1.7
Conservative	S. Hutchen	422	11.9	Steady
Green	Brian Gibbs	63	1.8	▼0.1
Majority		1,482	41.6	▲3.5
Registered electors		11,171		
Turnout			31.9	▼3.2
Liberal Democrats hold		Swing	▲1.8	

=== Egerton ===
Egerton
Party	Candidate	Votes	%	±%
Labour	Walter Smith	1,441	65.1	▲6.5
Conservative	Cyrus Ferguson	368	16.6	▲0.7
Liberal Democrats	Philip Lloyd	234	10.6	▼0.7
Green	Catherine Page	172	7.8	▲0.5
Majority		1,073	48.4	▲5.7
Registered electors		10,468		
Turnout			21.2	▲0.1
Labour hold		Swing	▲2.9	

=== Heswall ===
Heswall
Party	Candidate	Votes	%	±%
Conservative	Peter Johnson	2,894	67.9	▲6.3
Labour	Margaret Allen	740	17.4	▼4.6
Liberal Democrats	Jean Norton	508	11.9	▼1.3
Green	Garnette Bowler	118	2.8	▼0.5
Majority		2,154	50.6	▲11.0
Registered electors		13,325		
Turnout			32.0	▼1.7
Conservative hold		Swing	▲5.5	

=== Hoylake ===
Hoylake
Party	Candidate	Votes	%	±%
Conservative	John Hale	2,820	67.2	▲3.6
Labour	Dennis Woods	782	18.6	▼1.9
Liberal Democrats	Alan Richards	446	10.6	▼1.2
Green	Allen Burton	149	3.6	▼0.4
Majority		2,038	48.6	▲5.5
Registered electors		12,447		
Turnout			33.7	▲1.3
Conservative hold		Swing	▲2.8	

=== Leasowe ===
Leasowe
Party	Candidate	Votes	%	±%
Labour	Ernest Prout	1,330	71.4	▲0.2
Conservative	J. Tooke	293	15.7	Steady
Liberal Democrats	M. Wright	239	12.8	▼0.3
Majority		1,037	55.7	▲0.1
Registered electors		9,187		
Turnout			20.3	▼0.5
Labour hold		Swing	▲0.1	

=== Liscard ===
Liscard
Party	Candidate	Votes	%	±%
Labour	John Cocker	1,343	56.1	▼1.7
Conservative	Patricia Jones	666	27.8	▲3.1
Liberal Democrats	James Robinson	387	16.2	▼1.3
Majority		677	28.3	▼4.9
Registered electors		11,010		
Turnout			21.8	▲0.7
Labour hold		Swing	▼2.4	

=== Moreton ===
Moreton
Party	Candidate	Votes	%	±%
Labour	Margaret Green	1,266	46.4	▼7.4
Conservative	Simon Mountney	1,222	44.8	▲8.5
Liberal Democrats	Susanne Uriel	239	8.8	▼1.1
Majority		44	1.6	▼15.9
Registered electors		9,737		
Turnout			28.0	▲0.1
Labour hold		Swing	▼8.0	

=== New Brighton ===
New Brighton
Party	Candidate	Votes	%	±%
Labour	Therese Irving	1,348	44.7	▼11.0
Conservative	Anthony Pritchard	1,286	42.6	▲11.5
Liberal Democrats	John Codling	281	9.3	▼0.7
Green	George Bowler	102	3.4	▲0.1
Majority		62	2.1	▼22.5
Registered electors		11,468		
Turnout			26.3	▼1.2
Labour hold		Swing	▼11.3	

=== Oxton ===
Oxton
Party	Candidate	Votes	%	±%
Liberal Democrats	Patricia Williams	2,103	66.0	▲11.3
Labour	John Salter	606	19.0	▼4.0
Conservative	Leonard Moore	380	11.9	▼4.9
Green	Pamela Mitchell	98	3.1	▼2.4
Majority		1,497	47.0	▲15.3
Registered electors		11,365		
Turnout			28.0	▲0.9
Liberal Democrats hold		Swing	▲7.7	

=== Prenton ===
Prenton
Party	Candidate	Votes	%	±%
Liberal Democrats	Simon Holbrook	2,071	54.3	▼2.5
Labour	C. Riley	918	24.1	▼1.1
Conservative	David Elderton	752	19.7	▲3.2
Green	John Wilson	76	2.0	▲0.5
Majority		1,153	30.2	▼1.3
Registered electors		11,460		
Turnout			33.3	▼3.2
Liberal Democrats gain from Labour		Swing	▼0.7	

=== Royden ===
Royden
Party	Candidate	Votes	%	±%
Conservative	Geoffrey Watt	1,887	40.7	▼4.0
Liberal Democrats	Peter Reisdorf	1,867	40.2	▲10.5
Labour	G. O'Neil	798	17.2	▼6.1
Green	Barbara Burton	88	1.9	▼0.4
Majority		20	0.4	▼14.7
Registered electors		12,694		
Turnout			36.5	▲5.3
Conservative hold		Swing	▼7.3	

=== Seacombe ===
Seacombe
Party	Candidate	Votes	%	±%
Labour	Adrian Jones	1,349	63.6	▼9.5
Liberal Democrats	K. Robinson	552	26.0	▲15.2
Conservative	K. Hobson	220	10.4	▼3.0
Majority		797	37.6	▼22.1
Registered electors		10,745		
Turnout			19.7	▲0.3
Labour hold		Swing	▼11.1	

=== Thurstaston ===
Thurstaston
Party	Candidate	Votes	%	±%
Conservative	Jeffrey Green	2,333	58.7	▲5.5
Labour	A. Terry	1,129	28.4	▼6.5
Liberal Democrats	Charles Wall	404	10.2	▲0.7
Green	Percy Hogg	108	2.7	▲0.3
Majority		1,204	30.3	▲11.9
Registered electors		12,445		
Turnout			31.9	▼1.0
Conservative hold		Swing	▲6.0	

=== Tranmere ===
Tranmere
Party	Candidate	Votes	%	±%
Labour	Christine Meaden	1,150	75.7	▼5.4
Liberal Democrats	Christopher Teggin	153	10.1	▼2.8
Conservative	Yvonne Sanne	126	8.3	New
Green	Angela Upton	91	6.0	Steady
Majority		997	65.6	▼2.6
Registered electors		9,068		
Turnout			16.8	▼0.7
Labour hold		Swing	▼1.3	

=== Upton ===
Upton
Party	Candidate	Votes	%	±%
Labour	Peter Corcoran	1,710	55.2	▲1.6
Conservative	D. Milligan	904	29.2	▼1.8
Liberal Democrats	Michael Redfern	392	12.6	Steady
Green	Joyce Hogg	94	3.0	▲0.2
Majority		806	26.0	▲3.4
Registered electors		12,310		
Turnout			25.2	▼1.8
Labour hold		Swing	▲1.7	

=== Wallasey ===
Wallasey
Party	Candidate	Votes	%	±%
Conservative	Ian Lewis	2,542	64.7	▲8.2
Labour	M. Keenan (Note: Incumbent councillor for New Brighton ward.)	916	23.3	▼6.0
Liberal Democrats	John Uriel	362	9.2	▼1.6
Green	F. Gillespie	108	2.7	▼0.7
Majority		1,626	41.4	▲14.3
Registered electors		11,813		
Turnout			33.3	▲0.4
Conservative gain from Labour		Swing	▲7.1	

== Notes ==
• italics denote the sitting councillor • bold denotes the winning candidate
