= 1986 Wirral Metropolitan Borough Council election =

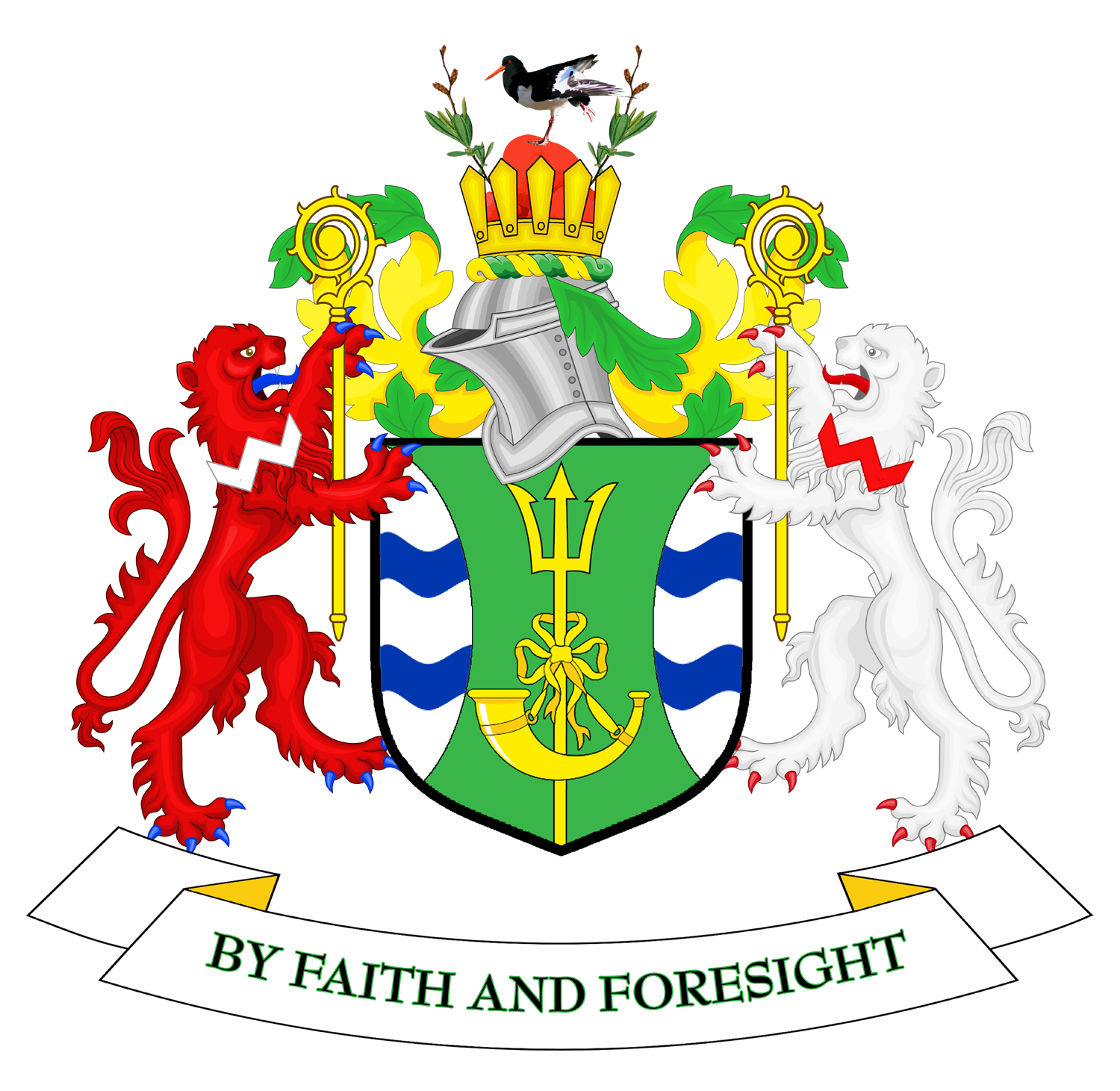
- 8 May 1986

24 of 66 seats (One Third and two by-elections) to Wirral Metropolitan Borough Council 34 seats needed for a majority
- Turnout: 46.6% (▲3.3%)
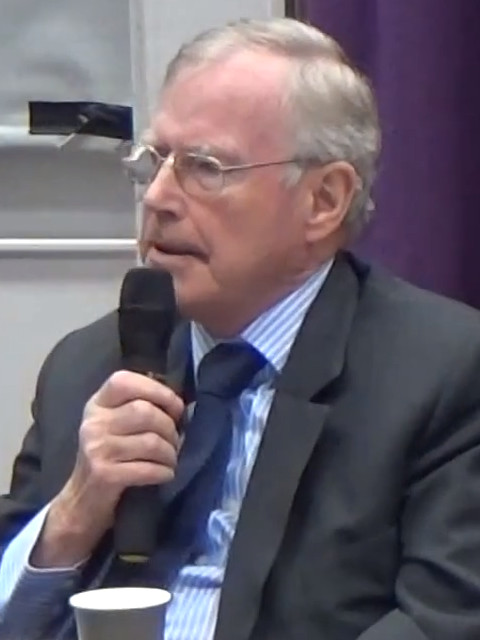
	First party	Second party	Third party
	Lab		SDP–Lib
Leader	George Clark	John Hale	Roy Perkins
Party	Labour	Conservative	Alliance
Leader's seat	Ran in Prenton (lost)	Liscard	Claughton
Last election	8 seats, 38.0%	12 seats, 42.9%	2 seats, 18.9%
Seats before	24	34	8
Seats won	10	9	5
Seats after	26	30	10
Seat change	▲2	▼4	▲2
Popular vote	44,991	41,772	29,813
Percentage	37.3%	34.6%	24.7%
Swing	▼0.7%	▼8.3%	▲5.8%
- Map of results of 1986 election
Leader of the Council before election
John Hale
Conservative
Leader of the Council after election
John Hale (Conservative)
No Overall Control

The 1986 Wirral Metropolitan Borough Council election took place on 8 May 1986 to elect members of Wirral Metropolitan Borough Council in England. This election was held on the same day as other local elections.

After the election, the composition of the council was:

Party	Seats	±
Conservative	30	▼4
Labour	26	▲2
Alliance	10	▲2

== Election results ==
=== Overall election result ===
Overall result compared with 1984.

Wirral Metropolitan Borough Council election results, 1986
Party	Candidates						Votes		
Party	Stood	Elected	Gained	Unseated	Net	% of total	%	No.	Net %
Labour	24	10	2	0	▲2	45.5	37.3	44,991	▼0.7
Conservative	24	9	0	4	▼4	36.4	34.6	41,772	▼8.3
Alliance	24	5	2	0	▲2	18.2	24.7	29,813	▲5.8
Residents	2	0	0	0	Steady	0.0	2.1	2,551	N/A
Green	8	0	0	0	Steady	0.0	1.3	1,554	▲1.3

(Note: % of total refers to % of wards won.)

== Ward results ==
=== Bebington ===
Bebington
Party	Candidate	Votes	%	±%
Conservative	A. Green	2,860	49.0	▼6.2
Labour	William Nock	1,826	31.3	▲0.5
Alliance	Kevin Turner	1,049	18.0	▲3.9
Green	K. McKee	107	1.8	New
Majority		1,034	17.7	▼6.7
Registered electors		11,329		
Turnout			51.6	▲1.3
Conservative hold		Swing	▼3.4	

=== Bidston ===
Bidston
Party	Candidate	Votes	%	±%
Labour	John Cocker	3,198	83.6	▲0.6
Conservative	W. Houldin	331	8.7	▼2.0
Alliance	K. Hughes	296	7.7	▲1.5
Majority		2,867	74.9	▲2.6
Registered electors		10,115		
Turnout			37.8	▲0.1
Labour hold		Swing	▲1.3	

=== Birkenhead ===
Birkenhead
Party	Candidate	Votes	%	±%
Labour	W. Craig	3,139	70.0	▼3.5
Alliance	R. Francis	987	22.0	▲7.7
Conservative	L. Jones	357	8.0	▼4.2
Majority		2,152	48.0	▼11.2
Registered electors		11,300		
Turnout			39.7	▲4.1
Labour hold		Swing	▼5.6	

=== Bromborough ===
Bromborough
Party	Candidate	Votes	%	±%
Labour	E. Williams	2,789	52.4	▲1.6
Conservative	C. Suffield	1,573	29.6	▼6.4
Alliance	F. Mushrow	961	18.1	▲4.9
Majority		1,216	22.8	▲8.0
Registered electors		11,615		
Turnout			45.8	▼1.5
Labour hold		Swing	▲4.0	

=== Clatterbridge ===
Clatterbridge
Party	Candidate	Votes	%	±%
Conservative	Myrra Lea	3,403	54.1	▼5.3
Alliance	Stephen Niblock	1,650	26.2	▲8.4
Labour	G. Chalinor	1,234	19.6	▼3.2
Majority		1,753	27.9	▼8.8
Registered electors		13,808		
Turnout			45.5	▼0.2
Conservative hold		Swing	▼4.4	

=== Claughton ===
Claughton
Party	Candidate	Votes	%	±%
Alliance	Roy Perkins	2,102	37.8	▲5.8
Labour	J. Pennington	1,678	30.2	▲0.6
Conservative	C. Bowditch	1,669	30.0	▼8.4
Green	K. Cuthbertson	109	2.0	New
Majority		424	7.6	N/A
Registered electors		10,957		
Turnout			50.7	▲1.3
Alliance hold		Swing	▲7.0	

=== Eastham ===
Eastham
Party	Candidate	Votes	%	±%
Alliance	Phillip Gilchrist	3,385	55.4	▲14.9
Labour	P. Spruce	1,650	27.0	▼3.0
Conservative	Mary Jordan	1,075	17.6	▼11.9
Majority		1,735	28.4	▲18.0
Registered electors		12,044		
Turnout			50.7	▲2.6
Alliance hold		Swing	▲9.0	

=== Egerton ===
Egerton
Party	Candidate	Votes	%	±%
Labour	P. Williams	2,842	54.4	▼1.6
Conservative	Hilary Jones	1,171	22.4	▼7.8
Alliance	W. Wood	1,082	20.7	▲6.9
Green	David Pye	130	2.5	New
Majority		1,671	32.0	▲6.3
Registered electors		11,481		
Turnout			45.5	▲3.6
Labour hold		Swing	▲3.1	

=== Heswall ===
Heswall
Party	Candidate	Votes	%	±%
Conservative	T. Price	3,851	63.0	▼8.6
Alliance	Robert Wilkins	1,696	27.8	▲9.0
Labour	George Davies	563	9.2	▼0.4
Majority		2,155	35.3	▼17.6
Registered electors		13,126		
Turnout			46.5	▲3.6
Conservative hold		Swing	▼8.8	

=== Hoylake ===
Hoylake
Party	Candidate	Votes	%	±%
Conservative	R. Amyes	2,671	43.9	▼21.8
Residents	J. Leonard	1,498	24.6	New
Alliance	J. Otterson	1,347	22.2	▲0.3
Labour	P. Morrin	565	9.3	▼3.0
Majority		1,173	19.3	▼24.5
Registered electors		12,549		
Turnout			48.5	▲5.5
Conservative hold		Swing	▼12.3	

=== Leasowe ===
Leasowe
Party	Candidate	Votes	%	±%
Labour	John George	2,591	62.2	▼0.5
Conservative	L. Kennedy	964	23.1	▼5.3
Alliance	B. Thomas	610	14.6	▲5.7
Majority		1,627	39.1	▲4.9
Registered electors		10,091		
Turnout			41.3	▲6.1
Labour hold		Swing	▲2.4	

=== Liscard ===
Liscard
Party	Candidate	Votes	%	±%
Labour	Gordon Paterson	2,724	45.9	▲4.1
Conservative	S. Morgan	2,267	38.2	▼3.7
Alliance	John Uriel	943	15.9	▼0.4
Majority		457	7.7	N/A
Registered electors		11,962		
Turnout			49.6	▲7.1
Labour gain from Conservative		Swing	▲3.9	

=== Moreton ===
Moreton
Party	Candidate	Votes	%	±%
Labour	Stuart Marshall-Clarke	2,311	46.0	▲2.3
Conservative	W. Leigh	1,773	35.3	▼8.7
Alliance	J. Eyres	939	18.7	▲6.4
Majority		538	10.7	N/A
Registered electors		9,298		
Turnout			54.0	▲5.3
Labour gain from Conservative		Swing	▲5.5	

=== New Brighton ===
New Brighton
Party	Candidate	Votes	%	±%
Conservative	Jack Redhead	2,150	40.0	▼7.0
Labour	A. Clark	1,978	36.8	▲3.7
Alliance	R. Curphey	1,243	23.1	▲6.0
Majority		172	3.2	▼10.6
Registered electors		11,818		
Turnout			45.4	▲1.8
Conservative hold		Swing	▼5.4	

=== Oxton ===
Oxton
Party	Candidate	Votes	%	±%
Alliance	Gordon Lindsay	2,607	48.6	▲5.0
Conservative	Leonard Moore	1,394	26.0	▼7.3
Labour	T. Kelly	1,248	23.3	▲1.2
Green	A. Tebbs	112	2.1	▲1.1
Majority		1,213	22.6	▲12.3
Registered electors		11,402		
Turnout			47.0	▼1.9
Alliance hold		Swing	▲6.2	

=== Prenton ===
Prenton (2)
Party	Candidate	Votes	%	±%
Alliance	Edward Cunniffe (Note: Elected to serve a 4-year term.)	2,681	40.4	▲19.0
Alliance	John Thornton (Note: Elected to serve a 1-year term.)	2,655	–	–
Conservative	M. Baker	2,106	31.7	▼12.9
Conservative	R. Stretch	1,934	–	–
Labour	John Clark (Note: Incumbent councillor for Leasowe ward.)	1,739	26.2	▼7.8
Labour	L. Blair	1,722	–	–
Green	C. Pye	109	1.6	New
Majority		575	8.7	N/A
Registered electors		12,580		
Turnout			53.9	▲8.4
Alliance gain from Conservative		Swing	▲10.7	
Alliance gain from Conservative		Swing	–	

=== Royden ===
Royden
Party	Candidate	Votes	%	±%
Conservative	W. Lloyd	2,848	49.0	▼15.1
Residents	W. Evans	1,053	18.1	New
Alliance	Peter Reisdorf	989	17.0	▼2.9
Labour	C. Harrison	923	15.9	▼0.2
Majority		1,795	30.9	▼13.3
Registered electors		12,648		
Turnout			46.0	▲7.2
Conservative hold		Swing	▼6.7	

=== Seacombe ===
Seacombe
Party	Candidate	Votes	%	±%
Labour	A. Cowderoy	3,377	67.9	▲0.2
Conservative	F. Hunter	928	18.7	▼4.7
Alliance	D. Kelly	667	13.4	▲4.5
Majority		2,449	49.3	▲5.0
Registered electors		12,053		
Turnout			41.3	▲2.5
Labour hold		Swing	▲2.5	

=== Thurstaston ===
Thurstaston (2)
Party	Candidate	Votes	%	±%
Conservative	David Fletcher	3,008	49.3	▼18.8
Conservative	Jeffrey Green	2,970	–	–
Alliance	Charles Wall	1,235	20.2	▲6.5
Alliance	Ray Pullen	1,109	–	–
Labour	M. Cooper	1,036	17.0	▼1.2
Green	David Burton	823	13.5	New
Labour	P. Connell	813	–	–
Majority		1,773	29.1	▼20.8
Registered electors		12,663		
Turnout			45.9	▲4.9
Conservative hold		Swing	▼10.4	
Conservative hold		Swing	–	

=== Tranmere ===
Tranmere
Party	Candidate	Votes	%	±%
Labour	William Davies	3,239	77.0	▲3.1
Conservative	J. Hockaday	466	11.1	▼3.6
Alliance	G. Pumford	420	10.0	▼1.5
Green	Garnette Bowler	83	2.0	New
Majority		2,773	65.9	▲6.7
Registered electors		11,003		
Turnout			38.2	▲3.2
Labour hold		Swing	▲3.4	

=== Upton ===
Upton
Party	Candidate	Votes	%	±%
Labour	Hugh Lloyd	3,048	50.3	▼0.6
Conservative	Geoffrey Watt	1,793	29.6	▼3.8
Alliance	Eric Copestake	1,142	18.8	▲3.1
Green	Cecil Bowler	81	1.3	New
Majority		1,255	20.7	▲3.2
Registered electors		12,586		
Turnout			48.2	▲2.7
Labour hold		Swing	▲1.6	

=== Wallasey ===
Wallasey
Party	Candidate	Votes	%	±%
Conservative	P. Moir	3,114	50.3	▼10.9
Alliance	P. Rimmer	1,782	28.8	▲7.8
Labour	G. Kenna	1,293	20.9	▲3.1
Majority		1,332	21.5	▼18.8
Registered electors		12,268		
Turnout			50.4	▲4.0
Conservative hold		Swing	▼9.4	

== Notes ==
• italics denote the sitting councillor • bold denotes the winning candidate
