= 1988 Wirral Metropolitan Borough Council election =

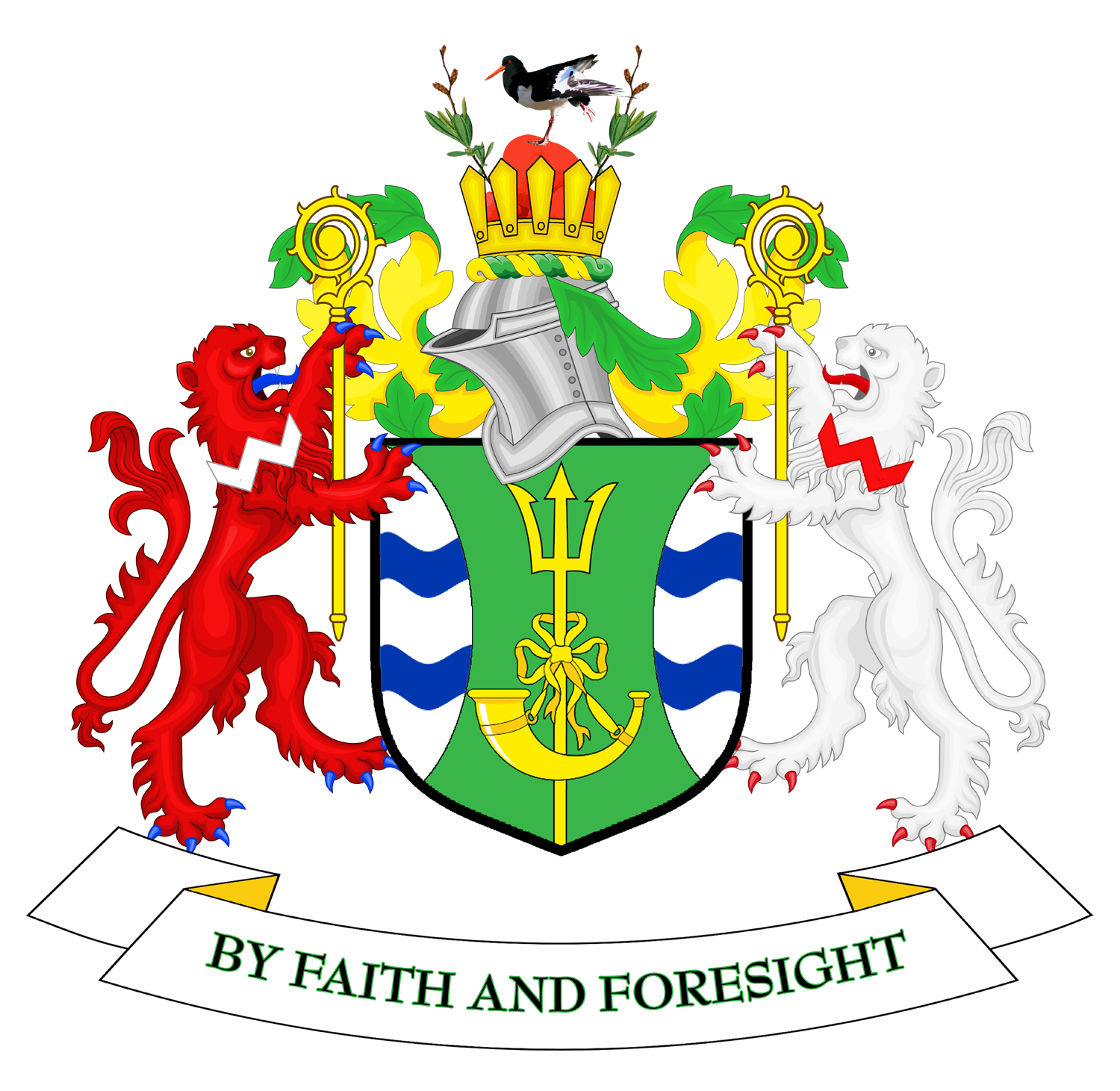
- 5 May 1988

22 of 66 seats (One Third) to Wirral Metropolitan Borough Council 34 seats needed for a majority
- Turnout: 44.5% (▼4.3%)
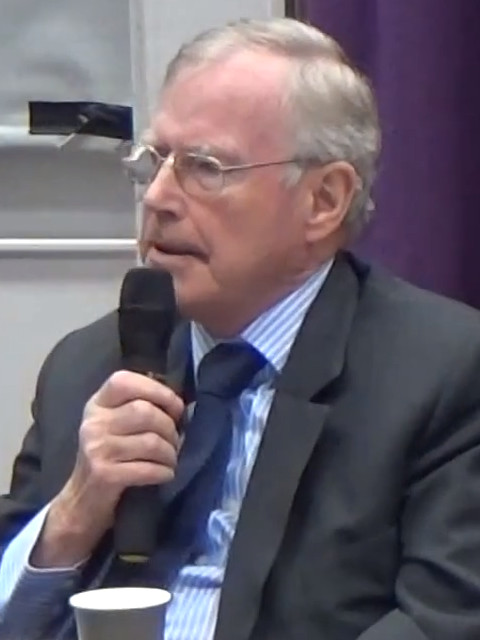
	First party	Second party	Third party
	Lab		SLD
Leader	Peter Corcoran	John Hale	Ed Cunniffe
Party	Labour	Conservative	SLD
Leader's seat	Upton	Liscard	Prenton
Last election	10 seats, 33.0%	10 seats, 42.1%	4 seats, 22.3%
Seats before	27	29	10
Seats won	13	7	2
Seats after	32	24	10
Seat change	▲5	▼5	Steady
Popular vote	47,974	47,921	15,451
Percentage	41.9%	41.9%	13.5%
Swing	▲8.9%	▼0.2%	▼8.8%
- Map of results of 1988 election
Leader of the Council before election
None
No Overall Control
Leader of the Council after election
None
No Overall Control

The 1988 Wirral Metropolitan Borough Council election took place on 5 May 1988 to elect members of Wirral Metropolitan Borough Council in England. This election was held on the same day as other local elections.

After the election, the composition of the council was:

Party	Seats	±
Labour	32	▲5
Conservative	24	▼5
SLD	10	Steady

== Election results ==
=== Overall election result ===
Overall result compared with 1987.

Wirral Metropolitan Borough Council election results, 1988
Party	Candidates						Votes		
Party	Stood	Elected	Gained	Unseated	Net	% of total	%	No.	Net %
Labour	22	13	5	0	▲5	59.1	41.9	47,974	▲8.9
Conservative	22	7	0	5	▼5	31.8	41.9	47,921	▼0.2
SLD	22	2	1	1	Steady	9.1	13.5	15,451	▼8.8
Green	18	0	0	0	Steady	0.0	2.3	2,687	▲1.1
SDP	2	0	0	0	Steady	0.0	0.3	389	N/A

== Ward results ==
=== Bebington ===
Bebington
Party	Candidate	Votes	%	±%
Conservative	Brian Cummings	3,008	54.2	▼1.6
Labour	A. Witter	1,909	34.4	▲8.3
SLD	Kevin Turner	351	6.3	▼10.1
Green	Garnette Bowler	282	5.1	▲3.4
Majority		1,099	19.8	▼9.9
Registered electors		11,363		
Turnout			48.8	▼6.6
Conservative hold		Swing	▼5.0	

=== Bidston ===
Bidston
Party	Candidate	Votes	%	±%
Labour	J. Williams	2,815	84.9	▲3.0
Conservative	W. Houldin	281	8.5	▼0.9
SLD	Stephen Niblock	141	4.3	▼4.4
Green	Robert Mitchell	78	2.4	New
Majority		2,534	76.4	▲3.9
Registered electors		9,256		
Turnout			35.8	▼4.5
Labour hold		Swing	▲2.0	

=== Birkenhead ===
Birkenhead
Party	Candidate	Votes	%	±%
Labour	William Lungley	3,035	76.5	▲7.0
Conservative	D. Smith	501	12.6	▲1.0
SLD	Stuart Kelly	333	8.4	▼10.5
Green	A. Harrison	98	2.5	New
Majority		2,534	63.9	▲13.3
Registered electors		11,005		
Turnout			36.0	▼3.2
Labour hold		Swing	▲6.7	

=== Bromborough ===
Bromborough
Party	Candidate	Votes	%	±%
Labour	David Jackson	2,898	58.1	▲10.2
Conservative	C. Molyneux	1,638	32.8	▼5.1
SLD	Simon Holbrook	364	7.3	▼6.9
Green	Perle Sheldricks	87	1.7	New
Majority		1,260	25.3	▲15.4
Registered electors		11,420		
Turnout			43.7	▼5.2
Labour hold		Swing	▲7.7	

=== Clatterbridge ===
Clatterbridge
Party	Candidate	Votes	%	±%
Conservative	Michael Moore	3,851	61.5	▼2.5
Labour	M. Harper	1,507	24.1	▲7.3
SLD	S. Dutton	724	11.6	▼7.6
Green	S. Birchenough	180	2.9	New
Majority		2,344	37.4	▼7.3
Registered electors		14,078		
Turnout			44.5	▼7.2
Conservative hold		Swing	▼3.7	

=== Claughton ===
Claughton
Party	Candidate	Votes	%	±%
Labour	George Davies	2,210	41.1	▲12.5
Conservative	Ian McKellar	1,903	35.4	▲3.6
SLD	Anna Blumenthal	1,114	20.7	▼17.0
Green	Pamela Mitchell	146	2.7	▲0.8
Majority		307	5.7	N/A
Registered electors		10,877		
Turnout			49.4	▼1.4
Labour gain from Conservative		Swing	▲7.4	

=== Eastham ===
Eastham
Party	Candidate	Votes	%	±%
Labour	Andrew Dow	1,896	34.5	▲9.4
SLD	D. Charles	1,840	33.5	▼7.8
Conservative	Mary Jordan	1,647	30.0	▼3.6
Green	Nigel Birchenough	107	1.9	New
Majority		56	1.0	N/A
Registered electors		11,917		
Turnout			46.1	▼6.7
Labour gain from SLD		Swing	▲4.4	

=== Egerton ===
Egerton
Party	Candidate	Votes	%	±%
Labour	Alec Dunn	3,062	66.2	▲13.8
Conservative	G. Francomb	1,023	22.1	▼4.7
SLD	K. Hughes	396	8.6	▼10.2
Green	David Pye	143	3.1	▲1.1
Majority		2,039	44.1	▲18.5
Registered electors		11,474		
Turnout			40.3	▼3.4
Labour hold		Swing	▲9.3	

=== Heswall ===
Heswall
Party	Candidate	Votes	%	±%
Conservative	M. Banks	4,349	75.8	▲4.3
Labour	Michael Sullivan	676	11.8	▲6.0
SLD	Robert Wilkins	519	9.0	▼11.9
Green	J. Bruce	195	3.4	▲1.7
Majority		3,673	64.0	▲13.4
Registered electors		13,362		
Turnout			43.0	▼9.1
Conservative hold		Swing	▲6.7	

=== Hoylake ===
Hoylake
Party	Candidate	Votes	%	±%
Conservative	Frank Jones	3,891	69.7	▲9.5
Labour	S. Christie	810	14.5	▲7.7
SLD	S. Welshman	642	11.5	▼2.6
Green	A. Brett	242	4.3	▲1.4
Majority		3,081	55.2	▲11.1
Registered electors		12,797		
Turnout			43.6	▼8.4
Conservative hold		Swing	▲5.6	

=== Leasowe ===
Leasowe
Party	Candidate	Votes	%	±%
Labour	Jim Edwards	2,805	69.0	▲8.0
Conservative	L. Kennedy	1,100	27.0	▼1.3
SLD	Susanne Uriel	162	4.0	▼6.8
Majority		1,705	42.0	▲9.3
Registered electors		9,865		
Turnout			41.2	▲0.8
Labour hold		Swing	▲4.7	

=== Liscard ===
Liscard
Party	Candidate	Votes	%	±%
Labour	E. Smith	3,321	53.3	▲13.4
Conservative	M. Ebbs	2,461	39.5	▼6.3
SLD	John Uriel	449	7.2	▼7.1
Majority		860	13.8	N/A
Registered electors		11,677		
Turnout			53.4	▲0.9
Labour gain from Conservative		Swing	▲9.9	

=== Moreton ===
Moreton
Party	Candidate	Votes	%	±%
Labour	John Clark	2,665	53.2	▲10.1
Conservative	I. Walker	2,048	40.9	▼0.3
SLD	B. Thomas	223	4.4	▼11.3
Green	George Bowler	76	1.5	New
Majority		617	12.3	▲10.4
Registered electors		9,233		
Turnout			54.3	▼0.8
Labour gain from Conservative		Swing	▲5.2	

=== New Brighton ===
New Brighton
Party	Candidate	Votes	%	±%
Labour	Colin Penfold	2,438	44.1	▲11.3
Conservative	P. Buzzard	2,404	43.5	▼0.2
SLD	L. Matthew	337	6.1	▼17.5
SDP	R. Curphey	224	4.1	New
Green	Allen Burton	125	2.3	New
Majority		34	0.6	N/A
Registered electors		11,868		
Turnout			46.6	▼0.8
Labour gain from Conservative		Swing	▲5.8	

=== Oxton ===
Oxton
Party	Candidate	Votes	%	±%
SLD	Michael Cooke	2,060	38.2	▼0.9
Conservative	Leonard Moore	1,979	36.7	▲1.2
Labour	T. Kelly	1,251	23.2	▲0.2
Green	A. Tebbs	102	1.9	▼0.4
Majority		81	1.5	▼2.1
Registered electors		11,550		
Turnout			46.7	▼1.7
SLD hold		Swing	▼1.1	

=== Prenton ===
Prenton
Party	Candidate	Votes	%	±%
SLD	Ray Pullen	2,432	39.9	▼2.3
Conservative	A. Clement	2,085	34.2	▼2.6
Labour	T. Collins	1,452	23.9	▲4.6
Green	D. Pye	119	2.0	▲0.3
Majority		347	5.7	▲0.2
Registered electors		12,462		
Turnout			48.9	▼6.2
SLD gain from Conservative		Swing	▲0.1	

=== Royden ===
Royden
Party	Candidate	Votes	%	±%
Conservative	Derek Robinson	3,491	64.9	▲6.1
Labour	D. Hughes	893	16.6	▲5.6
SLD	Peter Reisdorf	809	15.0	▼1.1
Green	K. Cuthbertson	185	3.4	▲0.4
Majority		2,598	48.3	▲5.6
Registered electors		12,790		
Turnout			42.0	▼8.2
Conservative hold		Swing	▲2.8	

=== Seacombe ===
Seacombe
Party	Candidate	Votes	%	±%
Labour	P. Clee	3,841	75.9	▲13.8
Conservative	G. Allen	887	17.5	▼3.9
SLD	H. Warner	169	3.3	▼13.2
SDP	J. Williams	165	3.3	New
Majority		2,954	58.4	▲17.7
Registered electors		11,856		
Turnout			42.7	▲2.3
Labour hold		Swing	▲8.9	

=== Thurstaston ===
Thurstaston
Party	Candidate	Votes	%	±%
Conservative	Sid Dunn	3,469	65.6	▲3.2
Labour	W. Gamet	985	18.6	▲5.5
SLD	Charles Wall	521	9.9	▼8.9
Green	David Burton	314	5.9	▲0.2
Majority		2,484	47.0	▲3.3
Registered electors		12,653		
Turnout			41.8	▼7.3
Conservative hold		Swing	▲1.7	

=== Tranmere ===
Tranmere
Party	Candidate	Votes	%	±%
Labour	R. Davies	2,893	79.1	▲11.8
Conservative	R. McGunigall	494	13.5	▼1.0
SLD	C. Townsend	176	4.8	▼11.7
Green	C. Rainsford	95	2.6	▲0.9
Majority		2,399	65.6	▲14.8
Registered electors		10,529		
Turnout			34.7	▼3.8
Labour hold		Swing	▲7.4	

=== Upton ===
Upton
Party	Candidate	Votes	%	±%
Labour	Keith Rimmer	3,105	55.3	▲9.9
Conservative	Geoffrey Caton	1,729	30.8	▲0.3
SLD	Elizabeth Brame	664	11.8	▼10.9
Green	G. Osler	113	2.0	▲0.6
Majority		1,376	24.5	▲9.6
Registered electors		12,731		
Turnout			44.1	▼6.8
Labour hold		Swing	▲4.8	

=== Wallasey ===
Wallasey
Party	Candidate	Votes	%	±%
Conservative	Kate Wood	3,682	59.3	▲6.6
Labour	M. Mannin	1,507	24.3	▲7.0
SLD	Moira Gallagher	1,025	16.5	▼13.4
Majority		2,175	35.0	▲12.2
Registered electors		12,200		
Turnout			50.9	▼3.6
Conservative hold		Swing	▲6.1	

== Changes between 1988 and 1990 ==
Date	Ward	Name	Previous affiliation	New affiliation	Circumstance
October 1988	Egerton	Alec Dunn	Labour	Independent Labour	Expelled.
October 1988	Leasowe	Jim Edwards	Labour	Independent Labour	Expelled.
October 1988	Leasowe	Ken Fox	Labour	Independent Labour	Expelled.

== Notes ==
• italics denote the sitting councillor • bold denotes the winning candidate
