= 1976 Wirral Metropolitan Borough Council election =

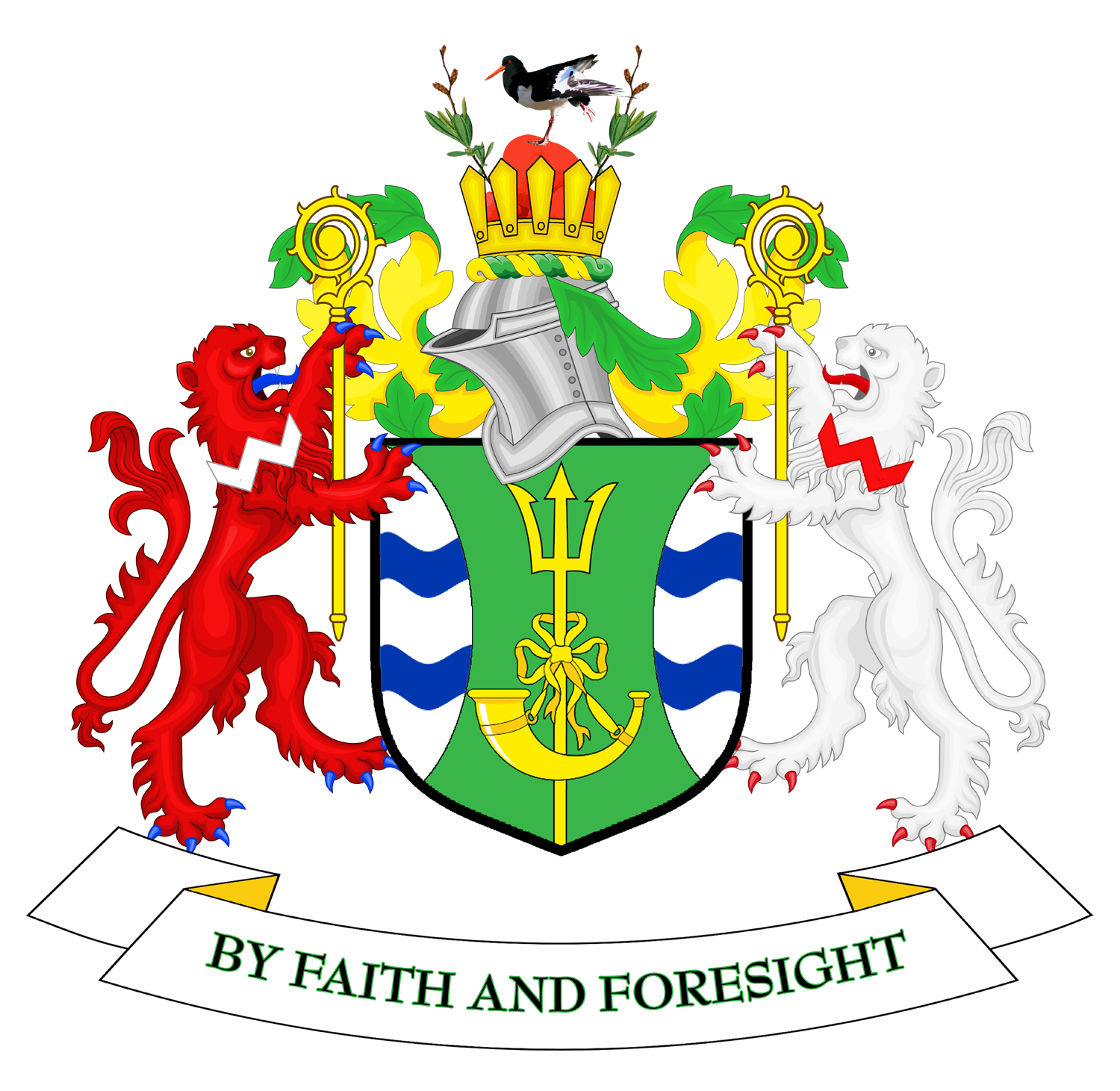
- 6 May 1976

23 of 66 seats (One Third and one by-election) to Wirral Metropolitan Borough Council 34 seats needed for a majority
- Turnout: 37.8% (▲1.1%)
	First party	Second party	Third party
	Con	Lab
Leader	Malcolm Thornton	Bill Wells	Gruff Evans
Party	Conservative	Labour	Liberal
Leader's seat	North Liscard-Upper Brighton Street	Leasowe	Cathcart-Claughton-Cleveland
Last election	16 seats, 54.7%	5 seats, 25.0%	1 seat, 19.7%
Seats before	37	21	8
Seats won	17	5	1
Seats after	42	18	6
Seat change	▲5	▼3	▼2
Popular vote	53,029	26,276	17,928
Percentage	54.3%	26.9%	18.4%
Swing	▼0.4%	▲1.9%	▼1.3%
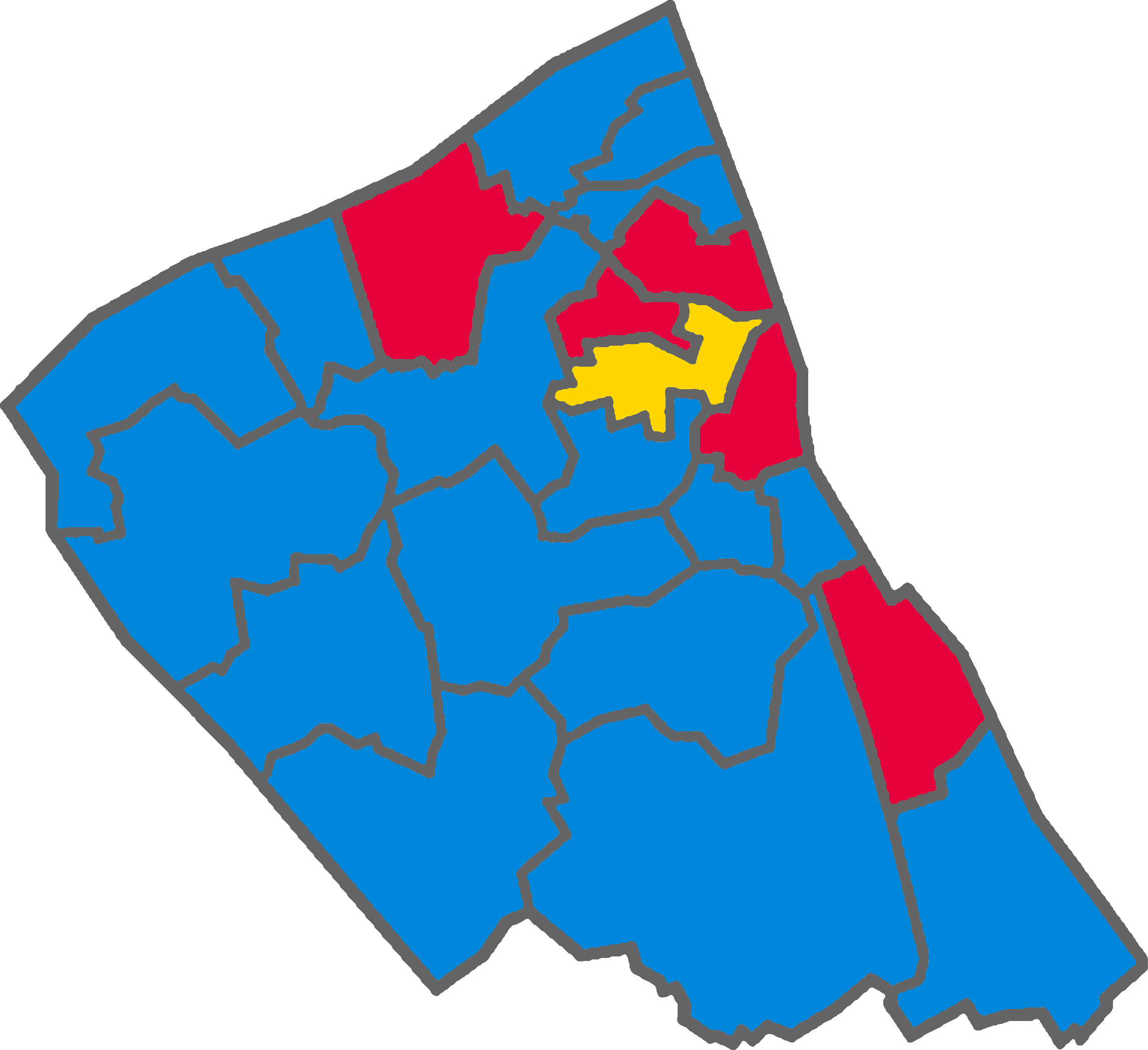
- Map of results of 1976 election
Leader of the Council before election
Malcolm Thornton
Conservative
Leader of the Council after election
Malcolm Thornton
Conservative

The 1976 Wirral Metropolitan Borough Council election took place on 6 May 1976 to elect Wirral Metropolitan Borough Council members in England. This election was held on the same day as other local elections.

After the election, the composition of the council was:

Party	Seats	±
Conservative	42	▲5
Labour	18	▼3
Liberal	6	▼2

== Election results ==
=== Overall election result ===
Overall result compared with 1975.

Wirral Metropolitan Borough Council election results, 1976
Party	Candidates						Votes		
Party	Stood	Elected	Gained	Unseated	Net	% of total	%	No.	Net %
Conservative	23	17	5	0	▲5	72.7	54.3	53,029	▼0.4
Labour	23	5	0	3	▼3	22.7	26.9	26,276	▲1.9
Liberal	21	1	0	2	▼2	4.5	18.4	17,928	▼1.3
Communist	2	0	0	0	Steady	0.0	0.2	187	Steady
Ind. Conservative	1	0	0	0	Steady	0.0	0.1	98	N/A
National Party	1	0	0	0	Steady	0.0	0.1	89	N/A
Independent	1	0	0	0	Steady	0.0	0.0	37	▼0.1

(Note: % of total refers to % of wards won.)

== Ward results ==
=== Birkenhead ===
==== No. 1 (Argyle-Clifton-Holt) ====
Argyle-Clifton-Holt
Party	Candidate	Votes	%	±%
Labour	William Lungley	1,354	46.9	▲2.3
Liberal	Roy Perkins	1,135	39.3	▲0.5
Conservative	F. Morton	397	13.8	▼2.9
Majority		219	7.6	▲1.8
Registered electors		8,498		
Turnout			34.0	▲5.4
Labour hold		Swing	▲0.9	

==== No. 2 (Bebington and Mersey) ====
Bebington and Mersey
Party	Candidate	Votes	%	±%
Conservative	H. Welsh	1,224	50.9	▲6.1
Labour	K. Muir	987	41.1	▲3.0
Liberal	J. Hughes	193	8.0	▼9.1
Majority		237	9.8	▲3.1
Registered electors		7,846		
Turnout			30.6	▼0.5
Conservative gain from Labour		Swing	▲1.6	

==== No. 3 (Cathcart-Claughton-Cleveland) ====
Cathcart-Claughton-Cleveland
Party	Candidate	Votes	%	±%
Liberal	John Evans	1,605	42.9	▼0.4
Conservative	R. Stretch	1,209	32.3	▲1.4
Labour	Walter Smith	798	21.3	▼4.5
National Party	R. Williams	89	2.4	New
Communist	J. Gowling	44	1.2	New
Majority		396	10.6	▼1.8
Registered electors		9,235		
Turnout			40.6	▲2.2
Liberal hold		Swing	▼0.9	

==== No. 4 (Devonshire and Egerton) ====
Devonshire and Egerton
Party	Candidate	Votes	%	±%
Conservative	J. Lee	1,902	45.5	▲7.3
Labour	J. Macdougal	1,322	31.6	▲7.1
Liberal	E. Hughes	958	22.9	▼14.4
Majority		580	13.9	▲13.0
Registered electors		12,209		
Turnout			34.3	▼0.4
Conservative gain from Liberal		Swing	▲6.5	

==== No. 5 (Gilbrook and St James) ====
Gilbrook and St James
Party	Candidate	Votes	%	±%
Labour	A. Jones	1,579	58.7	▲1.6
Conservative	H. Kirkby	562	20.9	▲0.2
Liberal	Roy Wood	551	20.5	▼1.7
Majority		1,017	37.8	▲2.9
Registered electors		8,611		
Turnout			31.3	▲3.6
Labour hold		Swing	▲1.5	

==== No. 6 (Grange and Oxton) ====
Grange and Oxton
Party	Candidate	Votes	%	±%
Conservative	M. Hesketh	2,490	48.6	▼1.5
Liberal	A. Halliday	1,689	33.0	▼0.2
Labour	A. Woods	944	18.4	▲1.7
Majority		801	15.6	▼1.3
Registered electors		12,849		
Turnout			39.9	▲3.6
Conservative gain from Liberal		Swing	▼0.6	

==== No. 7 (Prenton) ====
Prenton
Party	Candidate	Votes	%	±%
Conservative	Harry Deverill	3,304	64.6	▲9.3
Labour	J. Pennington	1,382	27.0	▲0.1
Liberal	J. Edwards	427	8.4	▼9.4
Majority		1,922	37.6	▲9.2
Registered electors		15,492		
Turnout			33.0	▼2.8
Conservative hold		Swing	▲4.6	

==== No. 8 (Upton) ====
Upton
Party	Candidate	Votes	%	±%
Conservative	M. Winter	3,271	56.9	▲1.6
Labour	Bernard Gilfoyle	2,338	40.6	▲7.3
Communist	G. Hughes	143	2.5	▼1.0
Majority		933	16.3	▼5.7
Registered electors		20,914		
Turnout			27.5	▲0.2
Conservative hold		Swing	▼2.9	

=== Wallasey ===
==== No. 9 (Leasowe) ====
Leasowe
Party	Candidate	Votes	%	±%
Labour	Bill Wells	2,135	50.2	▼1.4
Conservative	J. Merrill	1,707	40.1	▼4.8
Liberal	M. Goodwin	373	8.8	New
Independent	G. Smith	37	0.9	▼2.6
Majority		428	10.1	▲3.4
Registered electors		11,715		
Turnout			36.3	▲10.0
Labour hold		Swing	▲1.7	

==== No. 10 (Marlowe-Egremont-South Liscard) ====
Marlowe-Egremont-South-Liscard
Party	Candidate	Votes	%	±%
Conservative	M. Ebbs	2,439	54.9	▼13.0
Labour	E. Williams	1,306	29.4	▼2.7
Liberal	D. Green	695	15.7	New
Majority		1,133	25.5	▼10.3
Registered electors		12,883		
Turnout			34.5	▼0.3
Conservative hold		Swing	▼5.2	

==== No. 11 (Moreton and Saughall Massie) ====
Moreton and Saughall Massie
Party	Candidate	Votes	%	±%
Conservative	I. Walker	1,653	53.8	▼7.1
Labour	G. Watkins	1,134	36.9	▼2.2
Liberal	J. Jenkins	188	6.1	New
Ind. Conservative	G. Brotherton	98	3.2	New
Majority		519	16.9	▼4.9
Registered electors		7,266		
Turnout			42.3	▲6.2
Conservative gain from Labour		Swing	▼2.5	

==== No. 12 (New Brighton-Wallasey-Warren) ====
New Brighton-Wallasey-Warren
Party	Candidate	Votes	%	±%
Conservative	Kate Wood (Note: Elected as a Liberal.)	3,513	53.1	▼9.8
Liberal	D. Caldwell	2,509	37.9	▲12.3
Labour	B. Lloyd	593	9.0	▲1.1
Majority		1,004	15.2	▼22.1
Registered electors		14,758		
Turnout			44.8	▼2.1
Conservative hold		Swing	▼11.1	

==== No. 13 (North Liscard-Upper Brighton Street) ====
North Liscard-Upper Brighton Street
Party	Candidate	Votes	%	±%
Conservative	R. Venner	2,304	58.7	▼11.5
Liberal	F. Storey	982	25.0	▲10.5
Labour	John McCabe	637	16.2	▲1.2
Majority		1,322	33.7	▼21.5
Registered electors		11,662		
Turnout			33.6	▼2.0
Conservative hold		Swing	▼10.8	

==== No. 14 (Seacombe-Poulton-Somerville) ====
Seacombe-Poulton-Somerville
Party	Candidate	Votes	%	±%
Labour	T. Duffy	2,288	58.4	▲8.4
Conservative	A. Chantry	1,418	36.2	▼7.3
Liberal	R. Edge	215	5.5	▼1.1
Majority		870	22.2	▲15.7
Registered electors		11,730		
Turnout			33.4	▲6.5
Labour hold		Swing	▲7.9	

=== Bebington ===
==== No. 15 (Higher Bebington and Woodhey) ====
Higher Bebington and Woodhey
Party	Candidate	Votes	%	±%
Conservative	Tim Richmond	3,805	75.9	▲6.1
Labour	M. Irvine	1,208	24.1	▲4.3
Majority		2,597	51.8	▲1.8
Registered electors		10,128		
Turnout			49.5	▲3.9
Conservative hold		Swing	▲0.9	

==== No. 16 (Park-New Ferry-North Bromborough) ====
Park-New Ferry-North Bromborough
Party	Candidate	Votes	%	±%
Labour	P. McCarthy	1,775	47.4	▲1.2
Conservative	O. Donaldson	1,643	43.8	▲4.5
Liberal	W. Walsh	329	8.8	▼5.7
Majority		132	3.6	▼3.3
Registered electors		9,774		
Turnout			38.3	▲2.8
Labour hold		Swing	▼1.7	

==== No. 17 (South Bromborough and Eastham) ====
South Bromborough and Eastham
Party	Candidate	Votes	%	±%
Conservative	D. Jones	2,457	38.0	▼9.7
Liberal	Phillip Gilchrist	2,330	36.0	▲16.6
Labour	M. Halliday	1,686	26.0	▼7.0
Majority		127	2.0	▼12.7
Registered electors		13,509		
Turnout			47.9	▲5.0
Conservative gain from Labour		Swing	▼6.4	

==== No. 18 (Lower Bebington and Poulton) ====
Lower Bebington and Poulton
Party	Candidate	Votes	%	±%
Conservative	Michael Moore	4,040	71.1	▲10.0
Labour	D. Roscoe	1,063	18.7	▲2.3
Liberal	P. Cubbin	581	10.2	▼12.2
Majority		2,977	52.4	▲13.7
Registered electors		12,417		
Turnout			45.8	▲3.5
Conservative hold		Swing	▲6.9	

=== Hoylake ===
==== No. 19 (Caldy and Frankby) ====
Caldy and Frankby
Party	Candidate	Votes	%	±%
Conservative	J. Gaughan	3,528	72.3	▼0.9
Liberal	B. Crosbie	824	16.9	▲0.4
Labour	J. Seaman	526	10.8	▲0.5
Majority		2,704	55.4	▼1.3
Registered electors		12,785		
Turnout			38.2	▲0.2
Conservative hold		Swing	▼0.7	

==== No. 20 (Central-Hoose-Meols-Park) ====
Central-Hoose-Meols-Park
Party	Candidate	Votes	%	±%
Conservative	Frank Jones	3,621	69.8	▲14.1
Liberal	I. Smith	1,214	23.4	▼20.9
Labour	J. Pennington	351	6.8	New
Majority		2,407	46.4	▲35.0
Registered electors		11,708		
Turnout			44.3	▼3.3
Conservative hold		Swing	▲17.5	

=== Wirral ===
==== No. 21 (Barnston-Gayton-Heswall-Oldfield) ====
Barnston-Gayton-Heswall-Oldfield (2)
Party	Candidate	Votes	%	±%
Conservative	A. Maddox (Note: Elected to serve a 4-year term.)	4,143	85.3	▲6.8
Conservative	M. Gates (Note: Elected to serve a 2-year term.)	4,120	–	–
Liberal	G. Collins	501	10.3	▼7.6
Liberal	A. Conway	495	–	–
Labour	Peter Corcoran	212	4.4	▲0.8
Labour	J. Gilfoyle	204	–	–
Majority		3,642	75.0	▲14.4
Registered electors		11,178		
Turnout			43.4	▼2.9
Conservative hold		Swing	▲7.2	
Conservative hold		Swing	–	

==== No. 22 (Irby-Pensby-Thurstaston) ====
Irby-Pensby-Thurstaston
Party	Candidate	Votes	%	±%
Conservative	A. Jones	2,399	65.1	▲5.9
Labour	H. Ellis-Thomas	658	17.9	▼12.7
Liberal	G. Hunt	629	17.1	▲6.9
Majority		1,741	47.2	▲18.6
Registered electors		9,632		
Turnout			38.3	▼5.9
Conservative hold		Swing	▲9.3	

== Notes ==
• italics denote the sitting councillor • bold denotes the winning candidate
