= 1979 Wirral Metropolitan Borough Council election =

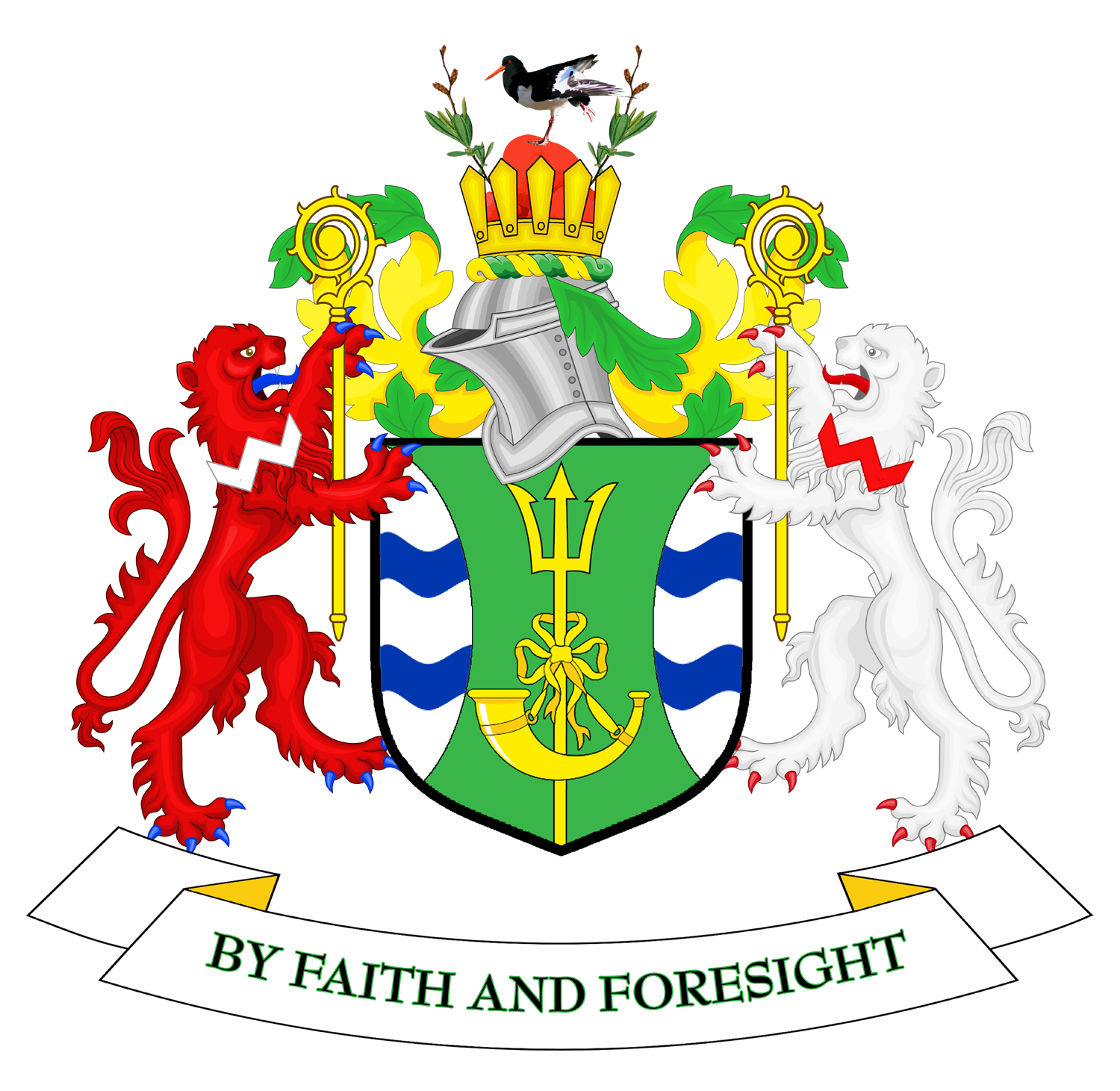
- 3 May 1979

23 of 66 seats (One Third and one by-election) to Wirral Metropolitan Borough Council 34 seats needed for a majority
- Turnout: 75.3% (▲39.7%)
	First party	Second party	Third party
	Con	Lab	Lib
Leader	Harry Deverill	Richard Kimberley	Gordon Lindsay
Party	Conservative	Labour	Liberal
Leader's seat	Prenton	Argyle-Clifton-Holt	Grange and Oxton
Last election	14 seats, 55.7%	6 seats, 28.4%	3 seats, 15.4%
Seats before	45	16	5
Seats won	12	9	2
Seats after	40	20	6
Seat change	▼5	▲4	▲1
Popular vote	93,891	70,639	30,430
Percentage	48.0%	36.2%	15.6%
Swing	▼7.7%	▲7.8%	▲0.2%
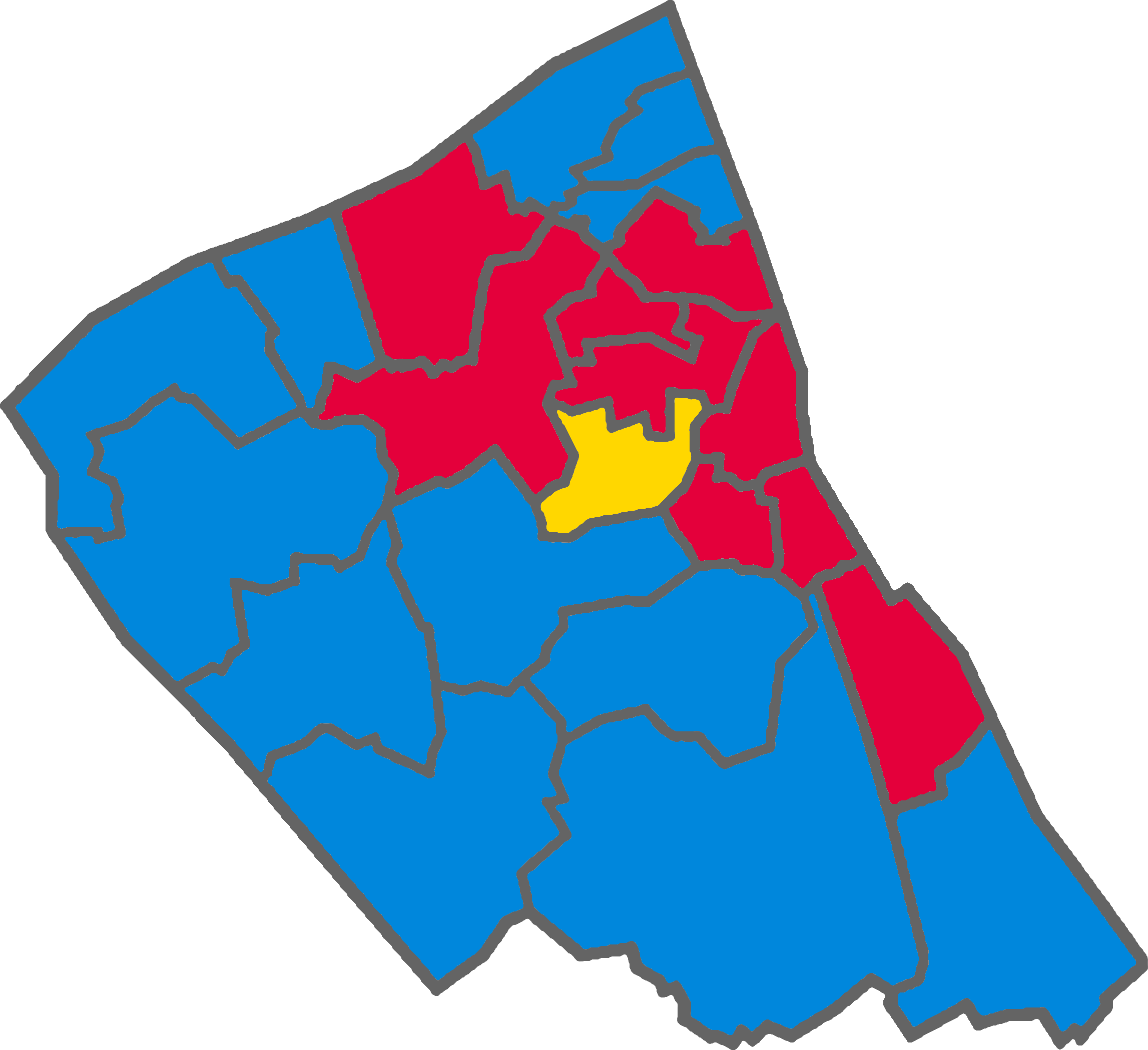
- Map of results of 1979 election
Leader of the Council before election
Harry Deverill
Conservative
Leader of the Council after election
Harry Deverill
Conservative

The 1979 Wirral Metropolitan Borough Council election took place on 3 May 1979 to elect members of Wirral Metropolitan Borough Council in England. This election was held on the same day as other local elections.

After the election, the composition of the council was:

Party	Seats	±
Conservative	40	▼5
Labour	20	▲4
Liberal	6	▲1

== Election results ==
=== Overall election result ===
Overall result compared with 1978.

Wirral Metropolitan Borough Council election results, 1979
Party	Candidates						Votes		
Party	Stood	Elected	Gained	Unseated	Net	% of total	%	No.	Net %
Conservative	23	12	0	5	▼5	54.5	48.0	93,891	▼7.7
Labour	23	9	4	0	▲4	40.9	36.2	70,639	▲7.8
Liberal	17	2	2	1	▲1	4.5	15.6	30,430	▲0.2
National Front	2	0	0	0	Steady	0.0	0.2	368	Steady
Communist	1	0	0	0	Steady	0.0	0.0	77	▼0.1

(Note: % of total refers to % of wards won.)

== Ward results ==
=== Birkenhead ===
==== No. 1 (Argyle-Clifton-Holt) ====
Argyle-Clifton-Holt
Party	Candidate	Votes	%	±%
Labour	Arthur Smith	2,867	59.2	▲6.5
Conservative	A. Adams	1,092	22.5	▲1.0
Liberal	J. Smith	887	18.3	▼4.1
Majority		1,775	36.7	▲6.4
Registered electors		7,259		
Turnout			66.8	▲34.4
Labour hold		Swing	▲3.2	

==== No. 2 (Bebington and Mersey) ====
Bebington and Mersey
Party	Candidate	Votes	%	±%
Labour	Walter Smith	2,802	53.1	▲4.3
Conservative	D. Welsh	1,679	31.8	▼13.6
Liberal	S. Evans	716	13.6	▲7.7
Communist	J. Norris	77	1.5	New
Majority		1,123	21.3	▲17.9
Registered electors		7,556		
Turnout			69.8	▲37.2
Labour gain from Conservative		Swing	▲9.0	

==== No. 3 (Cathcart-Claughton-Cleveland) ====
Cathcart-Claughton-Cleveland
Party	Candidate	Votes	%	±%
Labour	P. Liddell	2,214	36.0	▲12.1
Liberal	A. Jones	2,210	35.9	▼2.9
Conservative	B. Lloyd	1,734	28.2	▼9.2
Majority		4	0.1	N/A
Registered electors		8,641		
Turnout			71.3	▲30.5
Labour gain from Liberal		Swing	▲0.8	

==== No. 4 (Devonshire and Egerton) ====
Devonshire and Egerton
Party	Candidate	Votes	%	±%
Labour	Ronald Leaper	3,454	39.0	▲6.1
Conservative	K. Allen	2,815	31.8	▼11.5
Liberal	G. Quinn	2,595	29.3	▲5.5
Majority		639	7.2	N/A
Registered electors		11,925		
Turnout			74.3	▲39.7
Labour gain from Conservative		Swing	▲8.8	

==== No. 5 (Gilbrook and St James) ====
Gilbrook and St James
Party	Candidate	Votes	%	±%
Labour	Andrew Davies	4,001	66.3	▼5.9
Conservative	K. Hughes	1,225	20.3	▲1.8
Liberal	Alan Brighouse	807	13.4	▲4.0
Majority		2,776	46.0	▼7.7
Registered electors		8,376		
Turnout			72.0	▲40.1
Labour hold		Swing	▼3.9	

==== No. 6 (Grange and Oxton) ====
Grange and Oxton (2)
Party	Candidate	Votes	%	±%
Liberal	A. Halliday (Note: Elected to serve a 4-year term.)	3,984	41.4	▼6.3
Liberal	Michael Cooke (Note: Elected to serve a 1-year term.)	3,830	–	–
Conservative	R. Hodkinson	3,241	33.7	▼3.1
Conservative	O. Donaldson	3,089	–	–
Labour	J. Coates	2,400	24.9	▲9.4
Labour	Barney Gilfoyle	2,209	–	–
Majority		743	7.7	▼3.2
Registered electors		13,242		
Turnout			72.7	▲32.1
Liberal gain from Conservative		Swing	▼1.6	
Liberal gain from Conservative		Swing	–	

==== No. 7 (Prenton) ====
Prenton
Party	Candidate	Votes	%	±%
Conservative	William Taylor	6,056	52.3	▼12.9
Labour	W. Leslie	5,531	47.7	▲12.9
Majority		525	4.6	▼25.8
Registered electors		15,422		
Turnout			75.0	▲45.3
Conservative hold		Swing	▼12.9	

==== No. 8 (Upton) ====
Upton
Party	Candidate	Votes	%	±%
Labour	Peter Corcoran	8,387	54.9	▲14.8
Conservative	J. Roberts	6,894	45.1	▼14.8
Majority		1,493	9.8	N/A
Registered electors		21,661		
Turnout			70.5	▲45.4
Labour gain from Conservative		Swing	▲14.8	

=== Wallasey ===
==== No. 9 (Leasowe) ====
Leasowe
Party	Candidate	Votes	%	±%
Labour	Ken Fox	5,072	56.8	▲1.4
Conservative	M. Kemble	2,786	31.2	▼9.7
Liberal	B. Thomas	1,078	12.1	▲8.4
Majority		2,286	25.6	▲11.1
Registered electors		11,982		
Turnout			74.6	▲44.4
Labour hold		Swing	▲5.6	

==== No. 10 (Marlowe-Egremont-South Liscard) ====
Marlowe-Egremont-South-Liscard
Party	Candidate	Votes	%	±%
Conservative	John Hale	4,252	45.2	▼14.4
Labour	G. Watkins	3,660	38.9	▲4.7
Liberal	M. Canning	1,250	13.3	▲7.0
National Front	F. Buckley	245	2.6	New
Majority		592	6.3	▼19.1
Registered electors		12,770		
Turnout			73.7	▲42.1
Conservative hold		Swing	▼9.6	

==== No. 11 (Moreton and Saughall Massie) ====
Moreton and Saughall Massie
Party	Candidate	Votes	%	±%
Conservative	David Williams	2,769	43.8	▼9.5
Labour	Jim Edwards	2,709	42.8	▲0.3
Liberal	E. Thomas	849	13.4	▲9.3
Majority		60	0.9	▼9.9
Registered electors		8,168		
Turnout			77.5	▲40.9
Conservative hold		Swing	▼4.9	

==== No. 12 (New Brighton-Wallasey-Warren) ====
New Brighton-Wallasey-Warren
Party	Candidate	Votes	%	±%
Conservative	C. Whatling	6,974	61.2	▼2.5
Liberal	N. Stribbling	2,180	19.1	▼9.2
Labour	D. Mason	2,115	18.6	▲10.6
National Front	J. Milns	123	1.1	New
Majority		4,794	42.1	▲6.7
Registered electors		14,454		
Turnout			78.8	▲33.4
Conservative hold		Swing	▲3.4	

==== No. 13 (North Liscard-Upper Brighton Street) ====
North Liscard-Upper Brighton Street
Party	Candidate	Votes	%	±%
Conservative	B. Nottage	4,511	53.3	▼22.2
Labour	J. Fairbrother	2,356	27.8	▲11.0
Liberal	G. Sharp	1,604	18.9	▲11.2
Majority		2,155	25.4	▼33.3
Registered electors		11,546		
Turnout			73.4	▲43.0
Conservative hold		Swing	▼16.6	

==== No. 14 (Seacombe-Poulton-Somerville) ====
Seacombe-Poulton-Somerville
Party	Candidate	Votes	%	±%
Labour	S. Wickham	4,400	54.1	▼3.9
Conservative	G. Elliot	2,463	30.3	▼2.8
Liberal	P. Mawdsley	1,277	15.7	▲11.9
Majority		1,937	23.8	▼1.1
Registered electors		11,223		
Turnout			72.5	▲38.9
Labour hold		Swing	▼0.5	

=== Bebington ===
==== No. 15 (Higher Bebington and Woodhey) ====
Higher Bebington and Woodhey
Party	Candidate	Votes	%	±%
Conservative	E. Pike	5,567	67.3	▼3.9
Labour	P. Wallace	2,704	32.7	▲12.7
Majority		2,863	34.6	▼16.6
Registered electors		10,181		
Turnout			81.2	▲35.9
Conservative hold		Swing	▼8.3	

==== No. 16 (Park-New Ferry-North Bromborough) ====
Park-New Ferry-North Bromborough
Party	Candidate	Votes	%	±%
Labour	Audrey Moore	3,862	51.8	▼0.4
Conservative	A. Stacey	3,600	48.2	▲0.4
Majority		262	3.6	▼0.8
Registered electors		9,828		
Turnout			75.9	▲35.3
Labour hold		Swing	▼0.4	

==== No. 17 (South Bromborough and Eastham) ====
South Bromborough and Eastham
Party	Candidate	Votes	%	±%
Conservative	David Allan	4,087	36.0	▲8.7
Liberal	R. Palmer	4,047	35.6	▼22.5
Labour	Ralph Dunning	3,225	28.4	▲13.8
Majority		40	0.4	N/A
Registered electors		13,985		
Turnout			81.2	▲35.3
Conservative hold		Swing	▲15.6	

==== No. 18 (Lower Bebington and Poulton) ====
Lower Bebington and Poulton
Party	Candidate	Votes	%	±%
Conservative	Dorothy Goodfellow	6,405	55.8	▼9.5
Liberal	Thomas Harney	2,650	23.1	▲6.6
Labour	A. Woods	2,432	21.2	▲3.0
Majority		3,755	32.7	▼14.3
Registered electors		14,163		
Turnout			81.1	▲41.8
Conservative hold		Swing	▼7.2	

=== Hoylake ===
==== No. 19 (Caldy and Frankby) ====
Caldy and Frankby
Party	Candidate	Votes	%	±%
Conservative	Reg Cumpstey	6,454	61.6	▼12.9
Liberal	B. Crosbie	2,406	22.9	▲11.0
Labour	C. Hiley	1,624	15.5	▲5.9
Majority		4,048	38.6	▼24.0
Registered electors		13,589		
Turnout			77.2	▲42.4
Conservative hold		Swing	▼12.0	

==== No. 20 (Central-Hoose-Meols-Park) ====
Central-Hoose-Meols-Park
Party	Candidate	Votes	%	±%
Conservative	H. Thompson	6,053	65.6	▼20.4
Liberal	F. Lewis	1,890	20.5	New
Labour	David Jackson	1,280	13.9	▼0.1
Majority		4,163	45.1	▼26.9
Registered electors		12,150		
Turnout			75.9	▲37.1
Conservative hold		Swing	▼13.5	

=== Wirral ===
==== No. 21 (Barnston-Gayton-Heswall-Oldfield) ====
Barnston-Gayton-Heswall-Oldfield
Party	Candidate	Votes	%	±%
Conservative	V. Robertson	7,783	86.2	▼4.9
Labour	W. Gamet	1,244	13.8	▲4.9
Majority		6,539	72.4	▼9.9
Registered electors		11,581		
Turnout			77.9	▲41.3
Conservative hold		Swing	▼4.9	

==== No. 22 (Irby-Pensby-Thurstaston) ====
Irby-Pensby-Thurstaston
Party	Candidate	Votes	%	±%
Conservative	W. Leigh	5,451	70.3	▼8.9
Labour	B. Cain	2,300	29.7	▲8.9
Majority		3,151	40.7	▼17.7
Registered electors		10,048		
Turnout			77.1	▲45.5
Conservative hold		Swing	▼8.9	

== Notes ==
• italics denote the sitting councillor • bold denotes the winning candidate
