= Prenton (ward) =

Electoral ward in Wirral, England

- Metropolitan Borough ward for Wirral Council
- Prenton within Wirral
- County: Merseyside
- Population: 14,475 (2016)
- Registered electors: 10,995 (2018)
- Settlements: Prenton

Current ward
- Created: 1973
- First Round Councillor: Naomi Graham (Green)
- Second Round Councillor: Chris Cooke (Green)
- Third Round Councillor: Harry Gorman (Green)
- Number of Councillors: Three

Overlaps
- UK Parliament constituency: Birkenhead

Prenton is a Wirral Metropolitan Borough Council Ward in the Birkenhead Parliamentary constituency. Through the first decade of the twenty-first century, the ward was in Liberal Democrat hands, before shifting firmly to Labour in the second. But the 2019 council elections saw a swing to the Green Party that has been presented as characteristic of the Green gains in English council elections that year.

== Councillors ==
| Election | Councillor (Party) | Councillor (Party) | Councillor (Party) | Ref. |
|---|---|---|---|---|
| 1973 | Pattinson (Conservative) | Harry Deverill (Conservative) | M. Baker (Conservative) | |
| 1975 | Barry Porter (Conservative) | Harry Deverill (Conservative) | M. Baker (Conservative) | |
| 1976 | Barry Porter (Conservative) | Harry Deverill (Conservative) | M. Baker (Conservative) | |
| 1978 | Barry Porter (Conservative) | Harry Deverill (Conservative) | M. Baker (Conservative) | |
| 1979 | William Taylor (Conservative) | Harry Deverill (Conservative) | M. Baker (Conservative) | |
| 1980 | William Taylor (Conservative) | Harry Deverill (Conservative) | M. Baker (Conservative) | |
| 1982 | William Taylor (Conservative) | Harry Deverill (Conservative) | M. Baker (Conservative) | |
| 1983 | William Taylor (Conservative) | Harry Deverill (Conservative) | M. Baker (Conservative) | |
| 1984 | William Taylor (Conservative) | A. Clement (Conservative) | M. Baker (Conservative) | |
| 1986 | John Thornton (Alliance /Liberal Democrats) | A. Clement (Conservative) | Edward Cunniffe (Alliance /Liberal Democrats) | |
| 1987 | John Thornton (Alliance /Liberal Democrats) | A. Clement (Conservative) | Edward Cunniffe (Alliance /Liberal Democrats) | |
| 1988 | John Thornton (Alliance /Liberal Democrats) | Ray Pullen (Liberal Democrats) | Edward Cunniffe (Alliance /Liberal Democrats) | |
| 1990 | John Thornton (Alliance /Liberal Democrats) | Ray Pullen (Liberal Democrats) | John Cocker (Labour) | |
| 1991 | Lesley Rennie (Conservative) | Ray Pullen (Liberal Democrats) | John Cocker (Labour) | |
| 1992 | Lesley Rennie (Conservative) | Howard Morton (Conservative) | John Cocker (Labour) | |
| 1994 | Lesley Rennie (Conservative) | Howard Morton (Conservative) | John Thornton (Liberal Democrats) | |
| 1995 | Edward Cunniffe (Liberal Democrats /Independent/Labour) | Howard Morton (Conservative) | John Thornton (Liberal Democrats) | |
| 1996 | Edward Cunniffe (Liberal Democrats /Independent/Labour) | Ann Bridson (Liberal Democrats) | John Thornton (Liberal Democrats) | |
| 1998 | Edward Cunniffe (Liberal Democrats /Independent/Labour) | Ann Bridson (Liberal Democrats) | John Thornton (Liberal Democrats) | |
| 1999 | Simon Holbrook (Liberal Democrats) | Ann Bridson (Liberal Democrats) | John Thornton (Liberal Democrats) | |
| 2000 | Simon Holbrook (Liberal Democrats) | Ann Bridson (Liberal Democrats) | John Thornton (Liberal Democrats) | |
| 2002 | Simon Holbrook (Liberal Democrats) | Ann Bridson (Liberal Democrats) | John Thornton (Liberal Democrats) | |
| 2003 by-election | Simon Holbrook (Liberal Democrats) | Ann Bridson (Liberal Democrats) | Frank Doyle (Liberal Democrats) | |
| 2003 | Simon Holbrook (Liberal Democrats) | Ann Bridson (Liberal Democrats) | Frank Doyle (Liberal Democrats) | |
| 2004 | Simon Holbrook (Liberal Democrats) | Ann Bridson (Liberal Democrats) | Frank Doyle (Liberal Democrats) | |
| 2006 | Simon Holbrook (Liberal Democrats) | Ann Bridson (Liberal Democrats) | Frank Doyle (Liberal Democrats) | |
| 2007 | Simon Holbrook (Liberal Democrats) | Ann Bridson (Liberal Democrats) | Frank Doyle (Liberal Democrats) | |
| 2008 | Simon Holbrook (Liberal Democrats) | Ann Bridson (Liberal Democrats) | Frank Doyle (Liberal Democrats) | |
| 2010 | Simon Holbrook (Liberal Democrats) | Ann Bridson (Liberal Democrats) | Denise Realey (Labour) | |
| 2011 | Paul Doughty (Labour) | Ann Bridson (Liberal Democrats) | Denise Realey (Labour) | |
| 2012 | Paul Doughty (Labour) | Tony Norbury (Labour) | Denise Realey (Labour) | |
| 2014 | Paul Doughty (Labour) | Tony Norbury (Labour) | Denise Realey (Labour) | |
| 2015 | Angela Davies (Labour) | Tony Norbury (Labour) | Denise Realey (Labour) | |
| 2016 | Angela Davies (Labour) | Tony Norbury (Labour) | Denise Realey (Labour) | |
| 2018 | Angela Davies (Labour) | Tony Norbury (Labour) | Samantha Frost (Labour) | |
| 2019 | Chris Cooke (Green) | Tony Norbury (Labour) | Samantha Frost (Labour) | |
| 2021 | Chris Cooke (Green) | Harry Gorman (Green) | Samantha Frost (Labour) | |
| 2022 | Chris Cooke (Green) | Harry Gorman (Green) | Naomi Graham (Green) | |
| 2023 | Chris Cooke (Green) | Harry Gorman (Green) | Naomi Graham (Green) | |

== Election results ==
2020s – 2010s – 2000s – 1990s – 1980s – 1970s – Notes – References

=== Elections of the 2020s ===
==== May 2023 ====
Wirral Metropolitan Borough Council election, 4 May 2023: Prenton
| Party | Candidate | Votes | % | ±% |
|---|---|---|---|---|
| Green | Christopher Cooke | 2,419 | 59.5 | ▲6.7 |
| Green | Harry Gorman | 2,297 | — | — |
| Green | Naomi Graham | 2,227 | — | — |
| Labour | John Ainsworth | 1,246 | 30.6 | ▼7.9 |
| Labour | Rachel Millard | 1,144 | — | — |
| Labour | Archie Wood | 1,012 | — | — |
| Conservative | Michael Clements | 215 | 5.3 | ▼1.0 |
| Conservative | Mark Davey-Hayford | 172 | — | — |
| Conservative | Sibani Ghosh | 161 | — | — |
| Liberal Democrats | Jonathan Richardson | 105 | 2.6 | ▲0.3 |
| Freedom Alliance | Lily Evans | 82 | 2.0 | New |
| Liberal Democrats | David Tyrrell | 57 | — | — |
| Majority | | 1,173 | 28.8 | ▲14.4 |
| Registered electors | | 10,871 | | |
| Turnout | | 3890 | 35.8 | ▼0.8 |
| Rejected ballots | | 14 | 0.4 | ▼0.1 |
| Green hold | | Swing | ▲7.3 | |
| Green hold | | Swing | — | |
| Green hold | | Swing | — | |

==== May 2022 ====
Wirral Metropolitan Borough Council election, 5 May 2022: Prenton
| Party | Candidate | Votes | % | ±% |
|---|---|---|---|---|
| Green | Naomi Graham | 2,087 | 52.8 | ▼1.7 |
| Labour | Julienne McGeough | 1,520 | 38.5 | ▲3.3 |
| Conservative | William Harland | 250 | 6.3 | ▼1.9 |
| Liberal Democrats | David Tyrrell | 92 | 2.3 | ▲0.2 |
| Majority | | 567 | 14.4 | ▼5.0 |
| Registered electors | | 10,850 | | |
| Turnout | | 3,967 | 36.6 | ▼1.0 |
| Rejected ballots | | 18 | 0.5 | ▼0.3 |
| Green gain from Labour | | Swing | ▼2.5 | |

==== May 2021 ====
Wirral Metropolitan Borough Council election, 6 May 2021: Prenton
| Party | Candidate | Votes | % | ±% |
|---|---|---|---|---|
| Green | Harry Gorman | 2,235 | 54.5 | ▼9.1 |
| Labour | Angie Davies | 1,441 | 35.2 | ▲3.2 |
| Conservative | Hilary Jones | 336 | 8.2 | ▲3.8 |
| Liberal Democrats | Lucy Johnson | 87 | 2.1 | New |
| Majority | | 794 | 19.4 | ▼12.2 |
| Registered electors | | 10,991 | | |
| Turnout | | 4,130 | 37.6 | ▼4.4 |
| Rejected ballots | | 31 | 0.8 | ▲0.1 |
| Green gain from Labour | | Swing | ▼6.2 | |

=== Elections of the 2010s ===
==== May 2019 ====
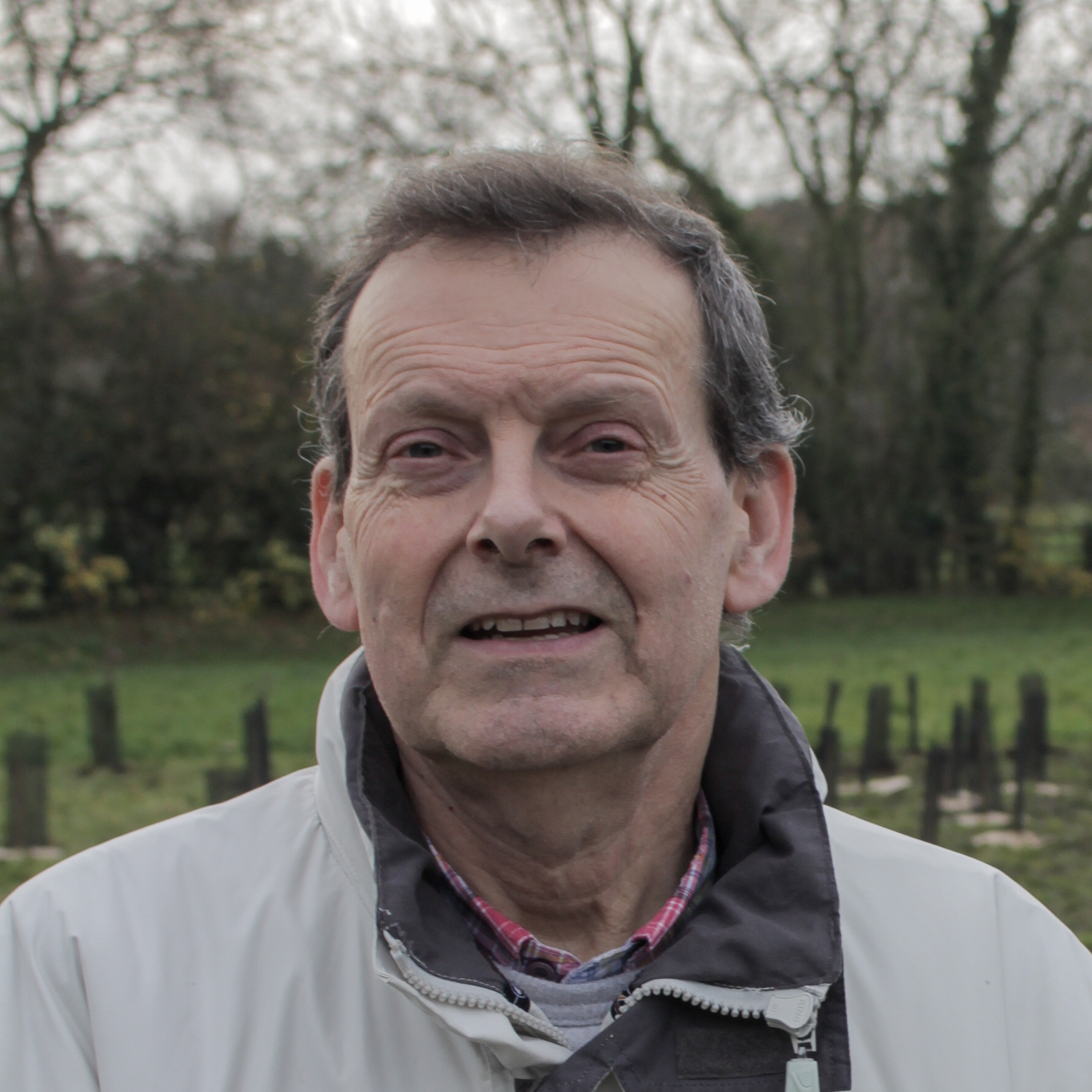
Green councillor Chris Cooke, elected in 2019.

Wirral Metropolitan Borough Council election, 2 May 2019: Prenton
| Party | Candidate | Votes | % | ±% |
|---|---|---|---|---|
| Green | Chris Cooke | 2,915 | 63.6 | ▲29.5 |
| Labour | Angie Davies | 1,467 | 32.0 | ▼17.4 |
| Conservative | Hilary Jones | 200 | 4.4 | ▼7.7 |
| Majority | | 1,448 | 31.6 | N/A |
| Registered electors | | 10,995 | | |
| Turnout | | 4,614 | 42.0 | ▲6.4 |
| Rejected ballots | | 32 | 0.7 | ▲0.4 |
| Green gain from Labour | | Swing | ▲23.5 | |

==== May 2018 ====
Wirral Metropolitan Borough Council election, 3 May 2018: Prenton
| Party | Candidate | Votes | % | ±% |
|---|---|---|---|---|
| Labour | Samantha Frost | 1,914 | 49.4 | ▼10.9 |
| Green | Chris Cooke | 1,322 | 34.1 | ▲24.2 |
| Conservative | Tom Bottom | 470 | 12.1 | ▼7.1 |
| Liberal Democrats | Mark Forshaw | 172 | 4.4 | ▼6.2 |
| Majority | | 592 | 15.3 | ▼25.8 |
| Registered electors | | 10,995 | | |
| Turnout | | 3,891 | 35.4 | ▲3.6 |
| Rejected ballots | | 19 | 0.5 | ▼0.6 |
| Labour hold | | Swing | ▼12.9 | |

==== May 2016 ====
Wirral Metropolitan Borough Council election, 5 May 2016: Prenton
| Party | Candidate | Votes | % | ±% |
|---|---|---|---|---|
| Labour | Tony Norbury | 2,028 | 60.3 | ▲1.0 |
| Conservative | Hilary Jones | 647 | 19.2 | ▲1.5 |
| Liberal Democrats | Allan Brame (Note: Councillor for Oxton, 2018 to present.) | 355 | 10.6 | ▲4.0 |
| Green | Christopher Cooke | 334 | 9.9 | ▲5.3 |
| Majority | | 1,381 | 41.1 | ▼0.5 |
| Registered electors | | 10,680 | | |
| Turnout | | 3,401 | 31.8 | ▼36.6 |
| Rejected ballots | | 37 | 1.1 | |
| Labour hold | | Swing | ▼0.2 | |

==== May 2015 ====
Wirral Metropolitan Borough Council election, 7 May 2015: Prenton
| Party | Candidate | Votes | % | ±% |
|---|---|---|---|---|
| Labour | Angela Davies | 4,362 | 59.3 | ▲12.3 |
| Conservative | Robert Hughes | 1,307 | 17.8 | ▲2.1 |
| UKIP | James Shorthall | 864 | 11.7 | ▼10.1 |
| Liberal Democrats | Allan Brame | 481 | 6.5 | ▼1.9 |
| Green | Moira Gommon | 342 | 4.6 | ▼2.6 |
| Majority | | 3,055 | 41.5 | ▲16.3 |
| Registered electors | | 10,790 | | |
| Turnout | | | 68.4 | ▲34.2 |
| Labour hold | | Swing | ▲8.2 | |

==== May 2014 ====
Wirral Metropolitan Borough Council election, 22 May 2014: Prenton
| Party | Candidate | Votes | % | ±% |
|---|---|---|---|---|
| Labour | Denise Realey | 1,731 | 47.0 | ▼6.9 |
| UKIP | James Bradshaw | 802 | 21.8 | ▲13.6 |
| Conservative | Hilary Jones | 578 | 15.7 | ▲6.4 |
| Liberal Democrats | Allan Brame | 310 | 8.4 | ▼15.0 |
| Green | Moira Gommon | 265 | 7.2 | ▲2.0 |
| Majority | | 929 | 25.2 | ▼5.3 |
| Registered electors | | 10,820 | | |
| Turnout | | | 34.2 | ▼2.0 |
| Labour hold | | Swing | ▼2.7 | |

==== May 2012 ====
Wirral Metropolitan Borough Council election, 3 May 2012: Prenton
| Party | Candidate | Votes | % | ±% |
|---|---|---|---|---|
| Labour | Tony Norbury | 2,061 | 53.9 | ▲2.7 |
| Liberal Democrats | Frank Doyle | 895 | 23.4 | ▼2.9 |
| Conservative | Cyrus Ferguson | 357 | 9.3 | ▼5.0 |
| UKIP | James Bradshaw | 313 | 8.2 | ▲3.1 |
| Green | Mark Mitchell | 200 | 5.2 | ▲2.1 |
| Majority | | 1,166 | 30.5 | ▲5.6 |
| Registered electors | | 10,595 | | |
| Turnout | | | 36.2 | ▼6.9 |
| Labour gain from Liberal Democrats | | Swing | ▲2.8 | |

==== May 2011 ====
Wirral Metropolitan Borough Council election, 5 May 2011: Prenton
| Party | Candidate | Votes | % | ±% |
|---|---|---|---|---|
| Labour | Paul Doughty | 2,376 | 51.2 | ▲11.6 |
| Liberal Democrats | Simon Holbrook | 1,219 | 26.3 | ▼5.3 |
| Conservative | Cyrus Ferguson | 662 | 14.3 | ▼4.1 |
| UKIP | James Bradshaw | 238 | 5.1 | ▼0.1 |
| Green | Mark Mitchell | 146 | 3.1 | ▲1.0 |
| Majority | | 1,157 | 24.9 | ▲16.9 |
| Registered electors | | 10,820 | | |
| Turnout | | | 43.1 | ▼21.8 |
| Labour gain from Liberal Democrats | | Swing | ▲8.5 | |

==== May 2010 ====
Wirral Metropolitan Borough Council election, 6 May 2010: Prenton
| Party | Candidate | Votes | % | ±% |
|---|---|---|---|---|
| Labour | Denise Realey | 2,827 | 39.6 | ▲15.7 |
| Liberal Democrats | Frank Doyle | 2,258 | 31.6 | ▼16.9 |
| Conservative | Robert Hughes | 1,316 | 18.4 | ▼2.5 |
| UKIP | Bruce Cain | 369 | 5.2 | New |
| BNP | Lee Griffiths | 219 | 3.1 | New |
| Green | Mark Mitchell | 150 | 2.1 | ▼2.0 |
| Majority | | 569 | 8.0 | N/A |
| Registered electors | | 11,039 | | |
| Turnout | | | 64.9 | ▲30.4 |
| Labour gain from Liberal Democrats | | Swing | ▲16.3 | |

=== Elections of the 2000s ===
==== May 2008 ====
Wirral Metropolitan Borough Council election, 1 May 2008: Prenton
| Party | Candidate | Votes | % | ±% |
|---|---|---|---|---|
| Liberal Democrats | Ann Bridson | 1,836 | 48.5 | ▼3.8 |
| Labour | Denise Realey | 905 | 23.9 | ▼3.0 |
| Conservative | John Gilbert | 792 | 20.9 | ▲4.4 |
| Green | Mark Mitchell | 154 | 4.1 | ▼0.2 |
| Liberal | Sean Keatley | 96 | 2.5 | New |
| Majority | | 931 | 24.6 | ▼0.8 |
| Registered electors | | 11,017 | | |
| Turnout | | | 34.5 | ▼2.4 |
| Liberal Democrats hold | | Swing | ▼0.4 | |

==== May 2007 ====
Wirral Metropolitan Borough Council election, 3 May 2007: Prenton
| Party | Candidate | Votes | % | ±% |
|---|---|---|---|---|
| Liberal Democrats | Simon Holbrook | 2,148 | 52.3 | ▲10.8 |
| Labour | Denise Realey | 1,105 | 26.9 | ▼5.4 |
| Conservative | Andrew Burns | 677 | 16.5 | ▼3.5 |
| Green | Mark Mitchell | 177 | 4.3 | ▼1.9 |
| Majority | | 1,043 | 25.4 | ▲16.2 |
| Registered electors | | 11,141 | | |
| Turnout | | | 36.9 | ▲2.7 |
| Liberal Democrats hold | | Swing | ▲8.1 | |

==== May 2006 ====
Wirral Metropolitan Borough Council election, 4 May 2006: Prenton
| Party | Candidate | Votes | % | ±% |
|---|---|---|---|---|
| Liberal Democrats | Francis Doyle | 1,558 | 41.5 | ▼1.4 |
| Labour | Denise Realey | 1,215 | 32.3 | ▲3.0 |
| Conservative | Susan Percy | 753 | 20.0 | ▲2.1 |
| Green | Mark Mitchell | 232 | 6.2 | ▲2.7 |
| Majority | | 343 | 9.2 | ▼4.4 |
| Registered electors | | 11,038 | | |
| Turnout | | | 34.2 | ▼10.2 |
| Liberal Democrats hold | | Swing | ▼2.2 | |

==== June 2004 ====
Wirral Metropolitan Borough Council election, 10 June 2004: Prenton
| Party | Candidate | Votes | % | ±% |
|---|---|---|---|---|
| Liberal Democrats | Magaret Bridson (Note: Elected to serve a 4-year term.) | 2,164 | 42.9 | N/A |
| Liberal Democrats | Simon Holbrook (Note: Elected to serve a 3-year term.) | 1,855 | – | – |
| Liberal Democrats | Francis Doyle (Note: Elected to serve a 2-year term.) | 1,832 | – | – |
| Labour | Gerard Allen | 1,476 | 29.3 | N/A |
| Labour | Denise Realey | 1,441 | – | – |
| Labour | Barbara Lee | 1,354 | – | – |
| Conservative | Mark Davey-Hayford | 905 | 17.9 | N/A |
| Conservative | Jonathan Mackie | 854 | – | – |
| Conservative | Bozena Hillyer | 779 | – | – |
| WIN | Ann Adams | 324 | 6.4 | N/A |
| Green | Matthew Adams | 176 | 3.5 | N/A |
| WIN | Marita Grace | 169 | – | – |
| WIN | Wallace Sturrock | 156 | – | – |
| Majority | | 688 | 13.6 | N/A |
| Registered electors | | 11,072 | | |
| Turnout | | | 44.4 | N/A |
| Liberal Democrats win (new seat) | | | | |
| Liberal Democrats win (new seat) | | | | |
| Liberal Democrats win (new seat) | | | | |

==== May 2003 ====
Wirral Metropolitan Borough Council election, 1 May 2003: Prenton
| Party | Candidate | Votes | % | ±% |
|---|---|---|---|---|
| Liberal Democrats | Simon Holbrook | 1,888 | 57.0 | ▲3.6 |
| Conservative | Ian McKellar | 705 | 21.3 | ▼0.5 |
| Labour | Gerard Allen | 638 | 19.2 | ▼5.6 |
| Green | Khalid Hussenbux | 84 | 2.5 | New |
| Majority | | 1,183 | 35.7 | ▲7.1 |
| Registered electors | | 11,506 | | |
| Turnout | | | 28.8 | ▼6.0 |
| Liberal Democrats hold | | Swing | ▲3.6 | |

==== February 2003 ====
By-election, 6 February 2003: Prenton
| Party | Candidate | Votes | % | ±% |
|---|---|---|---|---|
| Liberal Democrats | Francis Doyle | 1,764 | 63.3 | ▲9.9 |
| Conservative | Ian McKellar | 634 | 22.7 | ▲0.9 |
| Labour | Gerard Allen | 389 | 14.0 | ▼10.8 |
| Majority | | 1,130 | 40.6 | ▲12.0 |
| Registered electors | | 11,596 | | |
| Turnout | | | 24.0 | ▼10.8 |
| Liberal Democrats hold | | Swing | ▲6.0 | |

==== May 2002 ====
Wirral Metropolitan Borough Council election, 2 May 2002: Prenton
| Party | Candidate | Votes | % | ±% |
|---|---|---|---|---|
| Liberal Democrats | John Thornton | 2,153 | 53.4 | ▼2.1 |
| Labour | Gerard Allen | 1,001 | 24.8 | ▲6.5 |
| Conservative | Ian McKellar | 879 | 21.8 | ▼2.5 |
| Majority | | 1,152 | 28.6 | ▼2.6 |
| Registered electors | | 11,596 | | |
| Turnout | | | 34.8 | ▲5.0 |
| Liberal Democrats hold | | Swing | ▼1.3 | |

==== May 2000 ====
Wirral Metropolitan Borough Council election, 4 May 2000: Prenton
| Party | Candidate | Votes | % | ±% |
|---|---|---|---|---|
| Liberal Democrats | Margaret Bridson | 1,924 | 55.5 | ▲1.2 |
| Conservative | Ian McKellar | 843 | 24.3 | ▲4.6 |
| Labour | June Williams | 633 | 18.3 | ▼5.8 |
| Green | John Wilson | 68 | 2.0 | Steady |
| Majority | | 1,081 | 31.2 | ▲1.0 |
| Registered electors | | 11,659 | | |
| Turnout | | | 29.8 | ▼3.5 |
| Liberal Democrats hold | | Swing | ▲0.5 | |

=== Elections of the 1990s ===
==== May 1999 ====
Wirral Metropolitan Borough Council election, 6 May 1999: Prenton
| Party | Candidate | Votes | % | ±% |
|---|---|---|---|---|
| Liberal Democrats | Simon Holbrook | 2,071 | 54.3 | ▼2.5 |
| Labour | C. Riley | 918 | 24.1 | ▼1.1 |
| Conservative | David Elderton | 752 | 19.7 | ▲3.2 |
| Green | John Wilson | 76 | 2.0 | ▲0.5 |
| Majority | | 1,153 | 30.2 | ▼1.3 |
| Registered electors | | 11,460 | | |
| Turnout | | | 33.3 | ▼3.2 |
| Liberal Democrats gain from Labour | | Swing | ▼0.7 | |

==== May 1998 ====
Wirral Metropolitan Borough Council election, 7 May 1998: Prenton
| Party | Candidate | Votes | % | ±% |
|---|---|---|---|---|
| Liberal Democrats | John Thornton | 2,343 | 56.8 | ▲9.0 |
| Labour | Ray Pullen | 1,042 | 25.2 | ▼8.0 |
| Conservative | David Elderton | 679 | 16.5 | ▼2.5 |
| Green | Perle Sheldricks | 63 | 1.5 | New |
| Majority | | 1,301 | 31.5 | ▲16.8 |
| Registered electors | | 11,320 | | |
| Turnout | | | 36.5 | ▼5.7 |
| Liberal Democrats hold | | Swing | ▲8.5 | |

==== May 1996 ====
Wirral Metropolitan Borough Council election, 2 May 1996: Prenton
| Party | Candidate | Votes | % | ±% |
|---|---|---|---|---|
| Liberal Democrats | Margaret Bridson | 2,300 | 47.8 | ▲1.6 |
| Labour | Ray Pullen | 1,595 | 33.2 | ▼2.6 |
| Conservative | J. Thomas | 912 | 19.0 | ▲1.0 |
| Majority | | 705 | 14.7 | ▲4.3 |
| Registered electors | | 11,399 | | |
| Turnout | | | 42.2 | ▼1.3 |
| Liberal Democrats gain from Conservative | | Swing | ▲2.1 | |

==== May 1995 ====
Wirral Metropolitan Borough Council election, 4 May 1995: Prenton
| Party | Candidate | Votes | % | ±% |
|---|---|---|---|---|
| Liberal Democrats | Edward Cunniffe | 2,360 | 46.2 | ▼4.1 |
| Labour | Keith Williams | 1,828 | 35.8 | ▲10.3 |
| Conservative | A. Adams | 919 | 18.0 | ▼6.1 |
| Majority | | 532 | 10.4 | ▼14.4 |
| Registered electors | | 11,752 | | |
| Turnout | | | 43.5 | ▼11.5 |
| Liberal Democrats gain from Conservative | | Swing | ▼7.2 | |

==== May 1994 ====
Wirral Metropolitan Borough Council election, 5 May 1994: Prenton
| Party | Candidate | Votes | % | ±% |
|---|---|---|---|---|
| Liberal Democrats | John Thornton | 3,239 | 50.3 | ▲9.8 |
| Labour | John Cocker | 1,643 | 25.5 | ▲8.2 |
| Conservative | D. Morton | 1,554 | 24.1 | ▼17.1 |
| Majority | | 1,596 | 24.8 | N/A |
| Registered electors | | 11,707 | | |
| Turnout | | | 55.0 | ▲3.2 |
| Liberal Democrats gain from Labour | | Swing | ▲12.8 | |

==== May 1992 ====
Wirral Metropolitan Borough Council election, 7 May 1992: Prenton
| Party | Candidate | Votes | % | ±% |
|---|---|---|---|---|
| Conservative | Howard Morton | 2,577 | 41.2 | ▲2.0 |
| Liberal Democrats | John Thornton | 2,532 | 40.5 | ▲2.6 |
| Labour | John Mitchell | 1,083 | 17.3 | ▼3.4 |
| Green | Perle Shedricks | 63 | 1.0 | ▼1.1 |
| Majority | | 45 | 0.7 | ▼0.6 |
| Registered electors | | 12,083 | | |
| Turnout | | | 51.8 | ▼4.6 |
| Conservative gain from Liberal Democrats | | Swing | ▼0.3 | |

==== May 1991 ====
Wirral Metropolitan Borough Council election, 2 May 1991: Prenton
| Party | Candidate | Votes | % | ±% |
|---|---|---|---|---|
| Conservative | Lesley Rennie | 2,709 | 39.2 | ▲12.7 |
| Liberal Democrats | John Thornton | 2,620 | 37.9 | ▲4.9 |
| Labour | W. Lowe | 1,431 | 20.7 | ▼16.8 |
| Green | David Pye | 148 | 2.1 | ▼0.9 |
| Majority | | 89 | 1.3 | N/A |
| Registered electors | | 12,253 | | |
| Turnout | | | 56.4 | ▼2.3 |
| Conservative gain from Liberal Democrats | | Swing | ▲6.2 | |

==== May 1990 ====
Wirral Metropolitan Borough Council election, 3 May 1990: Prenton
| Party | Candidate | Votes | % | ±% |
|---|---|---|---|---|
| Labour | John Cocker | 2,685 | 37.5 | ▲13.6 |
| Liberal Democrats | Edward Cunniffe | 2,364 | 33.0 | ▼6.9 |
| Conservative | J. Weatherhead | 1,901 | 26.5 | ▼7.7 |
| Green | David Pye | 213 | 3.0 | ▲1.0 |
| Majority | | 321 | 4.5 | N/A |
| Registered electors | | 12,198 | | |
| Turnout | | | 58.7 | ▲9.8 |
| Labour gain from Liberal Democrats | | Swing | ▲5.1 | |

=== Elections of the 1980s ===
==== May 1988 ====
Wirral Metropolitan Borough Council election, 5 May 1988: Prenton
| Party | Candidate | Votes | % | ±% |
|---|---|---|---|---|
| SLD | Ray Pullen | 2,432 | 39.9 | ▼2.3 |
| Conservative | A. Clement | 2,085 | 34.2 | ▼2.6 |
| Labour | T. Collins | 1,452 | 23.9 | ▲4.6 |
| Green | D. Pye | 119 | 2.0 | ▲0.3 |
| Majority | | 347 | 5.7 | ▲0.2 |
| Registered electors | | 12,462 | | |
| Turnout | | | 48.9 | ▼6.2 |
| SLD gain from Conservative | | Swing | ▲0.1 | |

==== May 1987 ====
Wirral Metropolitan Borough Council election, 7 May 1987: Prenton
| Party | Candidate | Votes | % | ±% |
|---|---|---|---|---|
| Alliance | John Thornton | 2,959 | 42.2 | ▲1.8 |
| Conservative | Brian Cummings | 2,577 | 36.8 | ▲5.1 |
| Labour | W. Gamet | 1,356 | 19.3 | ▼6.9 |
| Green | C. Pye | 116 | 1.7 | ▲0.1 |
| Majority | | 382 | 5.5 | ▼3.2 |
| Registered electors | | 12,723 | | |
| Turnout | | | 55.1 | ▲1.2 |
| Alliance hold | | Swing | ▼1.7 | |

==== May 1986 ====
Wirral Metropolitan Borough Council election, 8 May 1986: Prenton
| Party | Candidate | Votes | % | ±% |
|---|---|---|---|---|
| Alliance | Edward Cunniffe | 2,681 | 40.4 | ▲19.0 |
| Alliance | John Thornton | 2,655 | – | – |
| Conservative | M. Baker | 2,106 | 31.7 | ▼12.9 |
| Conservative | R. Stretch | 1,934 | – | – |
| Labour | John Clark | 1,739 | 26.2 | ▼7.8 |
| Labour | L. Blair | 1,722 | – | – |
| Green | C. Pye | 109 | 1.6 | New |
| Majority | | 575 | 8.7 | N/A |
| Registered electors | | 12,580 | | |
| Turnout | | | 53.9 | ▲8.4 |
| Alliance gain from Conservative | | Swing | ▲10.7 | |
| Alliance gain from Conservative | | Swing | – | |

==== May 1984 ====
Wirral Metropolitan Borough Council election, 3 May 1984: Prenton
| Party | Candidate | Votes | % | ±% |
|---|---|---|---|---|
| Conservative | A. Clement | 2,607 | 44.6 | ▼5.4 |
| Labour | P. Taylor | 1,988 | 34.0 | ▲1.6 |
| Alliance | John Thornton | 1,251 | 21.4 | ▲3.8 |
| Majority | | 619 | 10.6 | ▼7.0 |
| Registered electors | | 12,854 | | |
| Turnout | | | 45.5 | ▼0.4 |
| Conservative hold | | Swing | ▼3.5 | |

==== May 1983 ====
Wirral Metropolitan Borough Council election, 5 May 1983: Prenton
| Party | Candidate | Votes | % | ±% |
|---|---|---|---|---|
| Conservative | William Taylor | 2,944 | 50.0 | ▲1.1 |
| Labour | P. Brady | 1,908 | 32.4 | ▲2.0 |
| Alliance | M. Miller | 1,039 | 17.6 | ▼3.1 |
| Majority | | 1,036 | 17.6 | ▼0.9 |
| Registered electors | | 12,839 | | |
| Turnout | | | 45.9 | Steady |
| Conservative gain from (new seat) | | Swing | ▼0.4 | |

==== May 1982 ====
Wirral Metropolitan Borough Council election, 6 May 1982: Prenton
| Party | Candidate | Votes | % | ±% |
|---|---|---|---|---|
| Conservative | M. Baker | 2,850 | 48.9 | ▼10.1 |
| Labour | Vincent McGee | 1,772 | 30.4 | ▼10.6 |
| Alliance | M. Miller | 1,204 | 20.7 | New |
| Majority | | 1,078 | 18.5 | ▲0.4 |
| Registered electors | | 12,701 | | |
| Turnout | | | 45.9 | ▲8.1 |
| Conservative gain from (new seat) | | Swing | ▲0.3 | |

==== May 1980 ====
Wirral Metropolitan Borough Council election, 1 May 1980: Prenton
| Party | Candidate | Votes | % | ±% |
|---|---|---|---|---|
| Conservative | Harry Deverill | 2,828 | 59.0 | N/A |
| Labour | H. Ellis-Thomas | 1,962 | 41.0 | N/A |
| Majority | | 866 | 18.1 | N/A |
| Registered electors | | 12,685 | | |
| Turnout | | | 37.8 | N/A |
| Conservative win (new seat) | | | | |

=== Elections of the 1970s ===
Wirral Metropolitan Borough Council election, 3 May 1979: Prenton
| Party | Candidate | Votes | % | ±% |
|---|---|---|---|---|
| Conservative | William Taylor | 6,056 | 52.3 | ▼12.9 |
| Labour | W. Leslie | 5,531 | 47.7 | ▲12.9 |
| Majority | | 525 | 4.5 | ▼25.9 |
| Registered electors | | 15,422 | | |
| Turnout | | | 75.0 | ▲45.3 |
| Conservative hold | | Swing | ▼12.9 | |

==== May 1978 ====
Wirral Metropolitan Borough Council election, 4 May 1978: 4 May 1978
| Party | Candidate | Votes | % | ±% |
|---|---|---|---|---|
| Conservative | M. Baker | 2,993 | 65.2 | ▲0.6 |
| Labour | F. Naylor | 1,597 | 34.8 | ▲7.8 |
| Majority | | 1,396 | 30.4 | ▼7.2 |
| Registered electors | | 15,422 | | |
| Turnout | | | 29.7 | ▼3.3 |
| Conservative hold | | Swing | ▼3.6 | |

==== May 1976 ====
Wirral Metropolitan Borough Council election, 6 May 1976: Prenton
| Party | Candidate | Votes | % | ±% |
|---|---|---|---|---|
| Conservative | Harry Deverill | 3,304 | 64.6 | ▲9.3 |
| Labour | J. Pennington | 1,382 | 27.0 | ▲0.1 |
| Liberal | J. Edwards | 427 | 8.4 | ▼9.4 |
| Majority | | 1,922 | 37.6 | ▲9.2 |
| Registered electors | | 15,492 | | |
| Turnout | | | 33.0 | ▼2.8 |
| Conservative hold | | Swing | ▲4.6 | |

==== May 1975 ====
Wirral Metropolitan Borough Council election, 1 May 1975: Prenton
| Party | Candidate | Votes | % | ±% |
|---|---|---|---|---|
| Conservative | George Porter | 3,088 | 55.3 | ▲3.6 |
| Labour | J. Pennington | 1,504 | 26.9 | ▼15.6 |
| Liberal | J. Edwards | 997 | 17.8 | New |
| Majority | | 1,584 | 28.4 | ▲19.2 |
| Registered electors | | 15,605 | | |
| Turnout | | | 35.8 | ▲1.2 |
| Conservative hold | | Swing | ▲9.6 | |

==== May 1973 ====
Wirral Metropolitan Borough Council election, 10 May 1973: Prenton
| Party | Candidate | Votes | % | ±% |
|---|---|---|---|---|
| Conservative | M. Baker | 2,846 | 51.7 | N/A |
| Conservative | Harry Deverill | 2,820 | – | – |
| Conservative | Pattinson | 2,729 | – | – |
| Labour | G. Llewellyn | 2,335 | 42.5 | N/A |
| Labour | Muir | 2,244 | – | – |
| Labour | Ainslie | 2,142 | – | – |
| Ind. Socialist | Connolly | 319 | 5.8 | N/A |
| Majority | | | 9.3 | N/A |
| Registered electors | | 15,882 | | |
| Turnout | | | 34.6 | N/A |
| Conservative win (new seat) | | | | |
| Conservative win (new seat) | | | | |
| Conservative win (new seat) | | | | |

== Notes ==
• italics denotes the sitting councillor • bold denotes the winning candidate
