= 2016 Wirral Metropolitan Borough Council election =

2016 local election in England

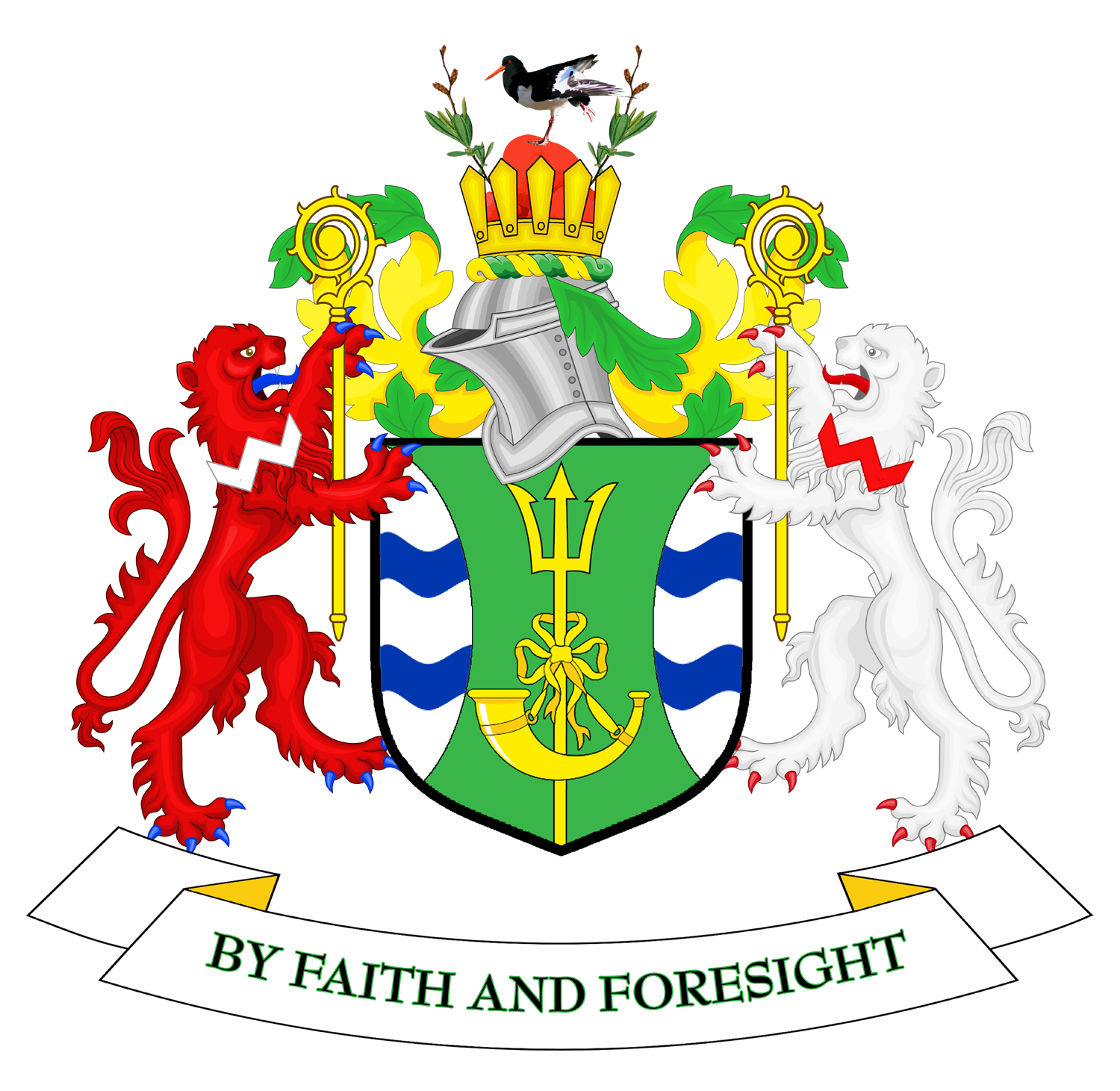
- 5 May 2016

23 of 66 seats (One Third and one by-election) to Wirral Metropolitan Borough Council 34 seats needed for a majority
- Turnout: 35.6% (▼33.5%)
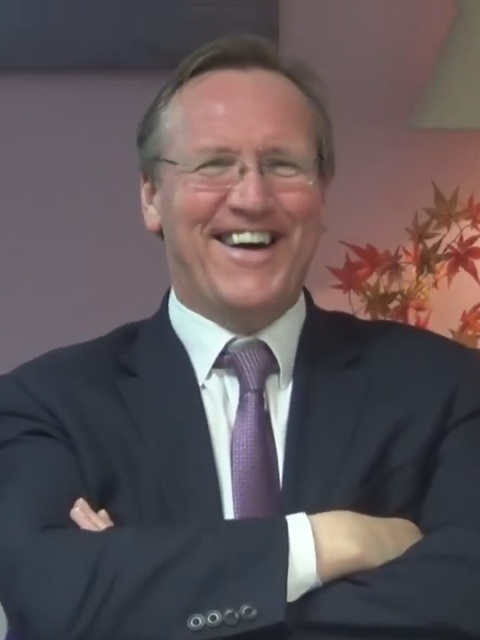

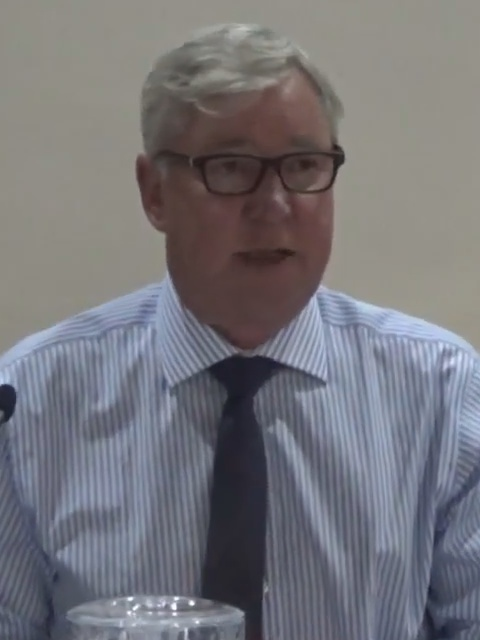

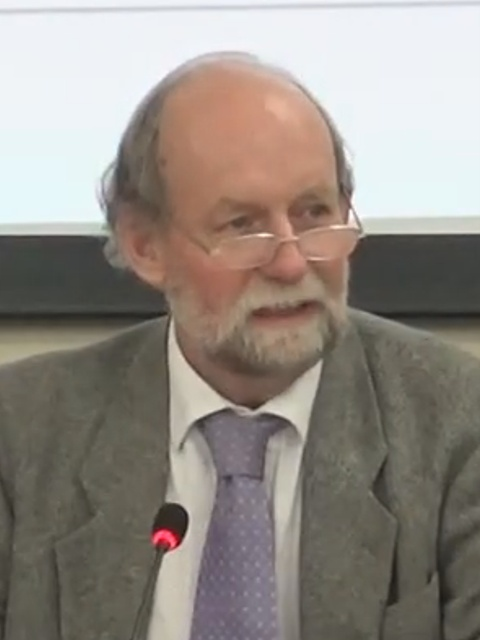

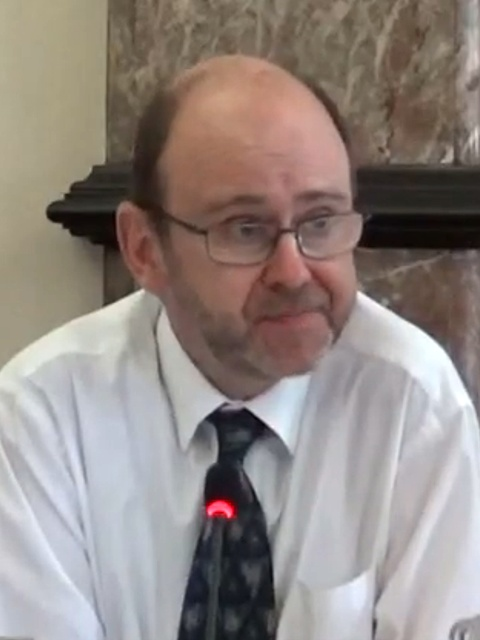
	First party	Second party
Leader	Phil Davies	Jeff Green
Party	Labour	Conservative
Leader's seat	Birkenhead and Tranmere	West Kirby and Thurstaston
Last election	14 seats, 47.9%	7 seats, 28.1%
Seats before	38	21
Seats won	14	7
Seats after	39	21
Seat change	▲1	Steady
Popular vote	38,832	25,956
Percentage	46.1%	30.8%
Swing	▼1.8%	▲2.7%
	Third party	Fourth party
Leader	Phil Gilchrist	Pat Cleary
Party	Liberal Democrats	Green
Leader's seat	Eastham	Birkenhead and Tranmere
Last election	1 seat, 8.2%	0 seats, 6.3%
Seats before	5	1
Seats won	2	0
Seats after	5	1
Seat change	Steady	Steady
Popular vote	9,216	5,703
Percentage	10.9%	6.8%
Swing	▲2.7%	▲0.5%
- Map of results of 2016 election
Leader of the Council before election
Phil Davies
Labour
Leader of the Council after election
Phil Davies
Labour

The 2016 Wirral Metropolitan Borough Council election took place on 5 May 2016 to elect members of Wirral Metropolitan Borough Council in England. This election was held on the same day as other local elections.

After the election, the composition of the council was:

Party	Seats	±
Labour	39	▲1
Conservative	21	Steady
Liberal Democrats	5	Steady
Green	1	Steady
Independent	0	▼1

== Election results ==
=== Overall election result ===
Overall result compared with 2015.

Wirral Metropolitan Borough Council election result, 2016
Party	Candidates						Votes		
Party	Stood	Elected	Gained	Unseated	Net	% of total	%	No.	Net %
Labour	23	14	1	0	▲1	59.1	46.1	38,832	▼1.8
Conservative	23	7	0	0	Steady	31.8	30.8	25,956	▲2.7
Liberal Democrats	19	2	0	0	Steady	9.1	10.9	9,216	▲2.7
Green	21	0	0	0	Steady	0.0	6.8	5,703	▲0.5
UKIP	9	0	0	0	Steady	0.0	3.7	3,088	▼5.3
Independent	1	0	0	1	▼1	0.0	1.2	985	▲1.1
TUSC	7	0	0	0	Steady	0.0	0.5	394	▲0.1

(Note: % of total refers to % of wards won.)

=== Changes in council composition ===
Prior to the election the composition of the council was:

↓
38	21	5	1	1
Lab	Con	LD	G	I

After the election the composition of the council was:

↓
39	21	5	1
Lab	Con	LD	G

Wirral Metropolitan Borough Council composition after the 2016 election

== Ward results ==
Results compared directly with the previous local election in 2015.

=== Bebington ===
Bebington
Party	Candidate	Votes	%	±%
Labour	Christina Muspratt	2,505	57.0	▼0.6
Conservative	Des Drury	952	21.7	▼2.1
UKIP	Jim Bradshaw	516	11.8	▲1.2
Liberal Democrats	Penelope Golby	233	5.3	▲2.4
Green	Anthony Smith	187	4.3	▼0.8
Majority		1,553	35.4	▲1.5
Registered electors		11,919		
Turnout		4,425	37.1	▼36.6
Rejected ballots		32	0.7	
Labour hold		Swing	▲0.7	

=== Bidston and St James ===
Bidston and St James
Party	Candidate	Votes	%	±%
Labour	Julie McManus	1,702	70.6	▼6.3
UKIP	Debbie Caplin	329	13.7	New
Conservative	Nick Hanna	190	7.9	▼2.8
Green	Jayne Clough	107	4.4	▼1.3
Liberal Democrats	Brian Gill	82	3.3	▲0.8
Trade_Unionist_and_Socialist_Coalition	Benjamin Halligan	52	2.1	▼1.5
Majority		1,373	57.0	▼19.9
Registered electors		9,985		
Turnout		2,473	24.8	▼31.2
Rejected ballots		12	0.5	
Labour hold		Swing	▼10.0	

=== Birkenhead and Tranmere ===
Birkenhead and Tranmere
Party	Candidate	Votes	%	±%
Labour	Jean Stapleton	1,555	47.9	▼8.2
Green	Steve Hayes	1,383	42.6	▲11.0
UKIP	Graeme Foster	203	6.3	▼1.7
Conservative	June Cowin	59	1.8	▼1.5
Liberal Democrats	Mary Price	35	1.1	Steady
TUSC	Jack Yarlett	11	0.3	New
Majority		172	5.3	▼19.2
Registered electors		9,703		
Turnout		3,264	33.6	▼23.3
Rejected ballots		18	0.6	
Labour hold		Swing	▼9.6	

=== Bromborough ===
Bromborough
Party	Candidate	Votes	%	±%
Labour	Warren Ward	1,805	50.5	▼8.8
Independent	Steve Niblock (Note: Deselected by Labour Party.)	985	27.6	N/A
Conservative	Pete Welch	442	12.4	▼6.1
Liberal Democrats	Jennifer Lane	151	4.2	▼0.6
Green	Percy Hogg	131	3.7	▼0.7
TUSC	Mark Halligan	60	1.7	▲0.1
Majority		820	22.9	▼17.9
Registered electors		11,384		
Turnout		3,599	31.6	▼34.7
Rejected ballots		25	0.7	
Labour gain from Independent		Swing	▼12.5	

=== Clatterbridge ===
Clatterbridge
Party	Candidate	Votes	%	±%
Conservative	Cherry Povall	2,333	51.7	▲10.4
Labour	Jenny Holliday	1,668	37.0	▼1.1
Liberal Democrats	Jan Cambridge	334	7.4	▲0.1
Green	Jim McGinley	177	3.9	▲0.3
Majority		665	14.7	▲11.5
Registered electors		11,454		
Turnout		4,538	39.6	▼36.6
Rejected ballots		26	0.6	
Conservative hold		Swing	▲5.8	

=== Claughton ===
Claughton
Party	Candidate	Votes	%	±%
Labour	George Davies	2,337	66.6	▲9.8
Conservative	Barbara Sinclair	628	17.9	▼0.2
Liberal Democrats	Christopher Teggin	237	6.8	▼0.3
Green	Moira Gommon	219	6.2	▼0.5
TUSC	Phil Simpson	89	2.5	New
Majority		1709	48.7	▲10.0
Registered electors		11,161		
Turnout		3,372	31.6	▼32.9
Rejected ballots		22	0.6	
Labour hold		Swing	▲5.01	

=== Eastham ===
Eastham
Party	Candidate	Votes	%	±%
Liberal Democrats	Phillip Gilchrist	2,695	67.0	▲21.9
Labour	Giuseppe Roberto	951	23.6	▼11.2
Conservative	Peter Taylor	294	7.1	▼9.2
Green	Perle Sheldricks	83	2.1	▼1.6
Majority		1,744	43.4	▲33.1
Registered electors		10,995		
Turnout		4,050	36.8	▼35.7
Rejected ballots		27	0.7	
Liberal Democrats hold		Swing	▲16.6	

=== Greasby, Frankby and Irby ===
Greasby, Frankby and Irby
Party	Candidate	Votes	%	±%
Conservative	Tom Anderson	2,182	48.5	▲8.1
Labour	Frank Harrison	1,294	28.8	▼4.2
Liberal Democrats	John Cresswell	792	17.6	▲2.9
Green	Cathy Page	232	5.2	▲1.3
Majority		888	19.7	▲12.3
Registered electors		11,369		
Turnout		4,529	39.8	▼38.6
Rejected ballots		29	0.6	
Conservative hold		Swing	▲6.1	

=== Heswall ===
Heswall
Party	Candidate	Votes	%	±%
Conservative	Kathryn Hodson	2,776	65.0	▲5.6
Labour	Jeff Judge	868	20.3	▲0.1
Green	Barbara Burton	334	7.8	▲2.4
Liberal Democrats	David Tyrrell	290	6.8	▲0.5
Majority		1908	44.7	▲5.5
Registered electors		10,768		
Turnout		4,304	40.0	▼38.5
Rejected ballots		24	0.6	
Conservative hold		Swing	▲2.8	

=== Hoylake and Meols ===
Hoylake and Meols
Party	Candidate	Votes	%	±%
Conservative	John Hale	2,186	54.2	▲3.4
Labour	Jean Robinson	1,218	30.2	▲1.0
Green	Alix Cockcroft	372	9.2	▼0.1
Liberal Democrats	Peter Reisdorf	261	6.5	▲1.9
Majority		968	24.0	▲2.3
Registered electors		10,429		
Turnout		4,063	39.0	▼38.0
Rejected ballots		26	0.6	
Conservative hold		Swing	▲1.2	

=== Leasowe and Moreton East ===
Leasowe and Moreton East
Party	Candidate	Votes	%	±%
Labour	Anita Leech	2,349	69.3	▲8.5
Conservative	William Eborall	802	23.7	▼1.0
Green	Gillian Homeri	240	7.1	▲3.0
Majority		1,547	45.6	▲9.5
Registered electors		10,690		
Turnout		3,413	31.9	▼34.0
Rejected ballots		22	0.6	
Labour hold		Swing	▲4.8	

=== Liscard ===
Liscard (2)
Party	Candidate	Votes	%	±%
Labour	Tom Usher (Note: Elected to serve a 4-year term.)	2,240	55.3	▼7.6
Labour	Janette Williamson (Note: Elected to serve a 2-year term.)	1,672	–	–
Conservative	Ann Lavin	690	17.0	New
UKIP	Lynda Williams	504	12.4	▼7.0
Conservative	Ann Parry	427	–	–
Green	Trevor Desrosiers	338	8.3	▲0.5
Liberal Democrats	Daniel Clein	280	6.9	▼1.4
Majority		1,550	38.3	▼5.2
Registered electors		10,982		
Turnout		3,604	32.8	▼31.7
Rejected ballots		12	0.3	
Labour hold		Swing	▼2.6	
Labour hold		Swing	–	

=== Moreton West and Saughall Massie ===
Moreton West and Saughall Massie
Party	Candidate	Votes	%	±%
Conservative	Chris Blakeley	2,384	56.8	▲12.5
Labour	Karl Greaney	1,425	34.0	▼8.5
UKIP	Beryl Jones	301	7.2	▼2.3
Green	Lindsey Stowell-Smith	86	2.0	▼1.6
Majority		959	22.8	▲21.0
Registered electors		10,682		
Turnout		4,213	39.4	▼29.9
Rejected ballots		17	0.4	
Conservative hold		Swing	▲10.5	

=== New Brighton ===
New Brighton
Party	Candidate	Votes	%	±%
Labour	Tony Jones	2,214	51.9	▼0.6
Conservative	Tony Pritchard	1,452	34.1	▲3.5
UKIP	Paula Walters	257	6.0	▼2.2
Green	Cynthia Stonall	197	4.6	▼4.1
Liberal Democrats	Jackie Usher	93	2.2	New
TUSC	Gregory North	51	1.2	New
Majority		762	17.8	▼4.1
Registered electors		10,946		
Turnout		4,280	39.1	▼27.3
Rejected ballots		16	0.4	
Labour hold		Swing	▼2.1	

=== Oxton ===
Oxton
Party	Candidate	Votes	%	±%
Liberal Democrats	Stuart Kelly	2,381	54.0	▲18.1
Labour	Vicky Nowak	1,568	35.6	▼4.1
Conservative	Philip Merry	275	6.2	▼4.8
Green	Liz Heydon	183	4.2	▼1.3
Majority		813	18.4	N/A
Registered electors		11,044		
Turnout		4,434	40.1	▼29.3
Rejected ballots		27	0.6	
Liberal Democrats hold		Swing	▲11.1	

=== Pensby and Thingwall ===
Pensby and Thingwall
Party	Candidate	Votes	%	±%
Labour	Mike Sullivan	2,243	48.5	▲9.4
Conservative	Andrew Gardner	1,541	33.3	▼3.6
UKIP	Jan Davison	417	9.0	▼1.1
Liberal Democrats	Damien Cummins	296	6.4	▼1.2
Green	Allen Burton	125	2.7	▼2.1
Majority		702	15.2	▲13.0
Registered electors		10,388		
Turnout		4,651	44.8	▼30.4
Rejected ballots		29	0.6	
Labour hold		Swing	▲6.5	

=== Prenton ===
Prenton
Party	Candidate	Votes	%	±%
Labour	Tony Norbury	2,028	60.3	▲1.0
Conservative	Hilary Jones	647	19.2	▲1.5
Liberal Democrats	Allan Brame	355	10.6	▲4.0
Green	Christopher Cooke	334	9.9	▲5.3
Majority		1,381	41.1	▼0.5
Registered electors		10,680		
Turnout		3,401	31.8	▼36.6
Rejected ballots		37	1.1	
Labour hold		Swing	▼0.2	

=== Rock Ferry ===
Rock Ferry
Party	Candidate	Votes	%	±%
Labour	Bill Davies	1,642	66.8	▲0.1
UKIP	Billy Foster	327	13.3	▲2.4
Conservative	Robert Hughes	209	8.5	▼1.3
Green	Kenny Peers	158	6.4	▼1.2
Liberal Democrats	Edward Smith	86	3.5	▲0.9
TUSC	Leah Halligan	38	1.5	▲0.3
Majority		1,315	53.4	▼2.3
Registered electors		9,641		
Turnout		2,480	25.7	▼32.6
Rejected ballots		20	0.8	
Labour hold		Swing	▼1.2	

=== Seacombe ===
Seacombe
Party	Candidate	Votes	%	±%
Labour	Paul Stuart	2,245	85.3	▲14.2
Conservative	John Laing	386	14.7	▲4.8
Majority		1,859	70.7	▲9.5
Registered electors		10,091		
Turnout		2,690	26.7	▼30.4
Rejected ballots		59	2.2	
Labour hold		Swing	▲4.8	

=== Upton ===
Upton
Party	Candidate	Votes	%	±%
Labour	Matthew Patrick	2,218	61.0	▼1.4
Conservative	Geoffrey Gubb	900	24.7	▲3.6
Green	Lily Clough	256	7.0	▲3.4
Liberal Democrats	Alan Davies	169	4.6	▲1.5
TUSC	Philip Jones	94	2.6	New
Majority		1,318	36.3	▼5.0
Registered electors		12,181		
Turnout		3,693	30.3	▼39.3
Rejected ballots		56	1.5	
Labour hold		Swing	▼2.5	

=== Wallasey ===
Wallasey
Party	Candidate	Votes	%	±%
Conservative	Ian Lewis	2,249	50.1	▲5.3
Labour	Bill McGenity	1,574	35.1	▼3.6
Green	John Rodgers	241	5.4	Steady
UKIP	Adam Heatherington	234	5.2	▼2.4
Liberal Democrats	John Codling	191	4.3	▲0.8
Majority		675	15.0	▲8.9
Registered electors		11,672		
Turnout		4,508	38.6	▼33.9
Rejected ballots		19	0.4	
Conservative hold		Swing	▲4.5	

=== West Kirby and Thurstaston ===
West Kirby and Thurstaston
Party	Candidate	Votes	%	±%
Conservative	Geoffrey Watt	2,379	57.5	▲6.9
Labour	James Laing	1,182	28.6	▲0.1
Green	Yvonne McGinley	320	7.7	▲0.5
Liberal Democrats	Mike Redfern	255	6.2	▼0.7
Majority		1,197	28.9	▲6.8
Registered electors		10,198		
Turnout		4,162	40.8	▼37.9
Rejected ballots		26	0.6	
Conservative hold		Swing	▲3.4	

== Changes between 2016 and 2018 ==
=== Claughton by-election 2017 ===
By-election, 4 May 2017: Claughton
Party	Candidate	Votes	%	±%
Labour	Gillian Wood	1,761	52.4	▼14.2
Liberal Democrats	David Evans	740	22.0	▲15.3
Conservative	Barbara Sinclair	567	16.9	▼1.0
Green	Liz Heydon	136	4.1	▼2.2
UK_Independence_Party	Beryl Jones	130	3.9	New
TUSC	Leon Wheddon	27	0.8	▼1.7
Majority		976	30.4	▼18.3
Registered electors		11,336		
Turnout		3,372	29.7	▼1.9
Rejected ballots		11	0.3	▼0.3
Labour hold		Swing	▼20.4	

== Notes ==
• italics denote the sitting councillor • bold denotes the winning candidate
