= 2010 Wirral Metropolitan Borough Council election =

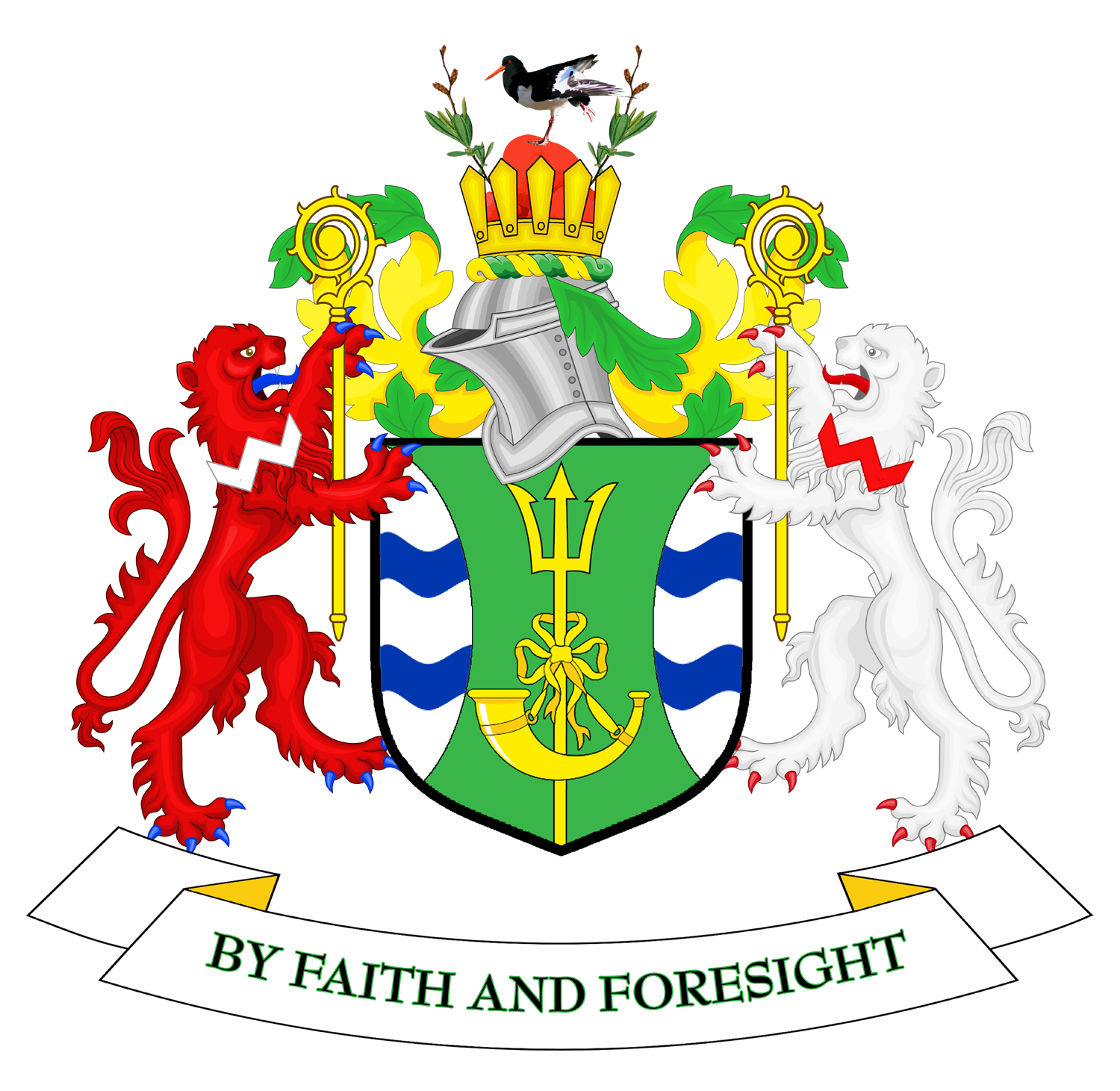
- 6 May 2010

23 of 66 seats (One Third and one by-election) to Wirral Metropolitan Borough Council 34 seats needed for a majority
- Turnout: 65.3% (▲29.3%)
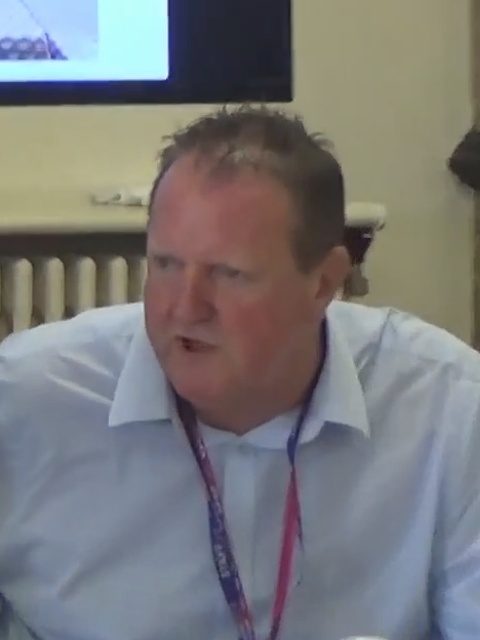

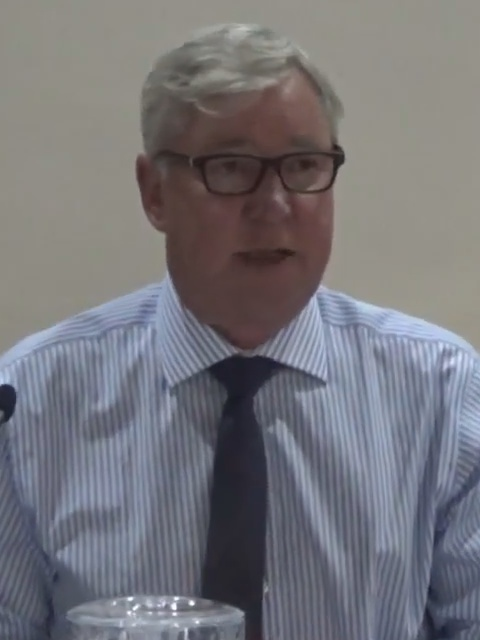

	First party	Second party	Third party
Leader	Steve Foulkes	Jeff Green	Simon Holbrook
Party	Labour	Conservative	Liberal Democrats
Leader's seat	Claughton	West Kirby and Thurstaston	Prenton
Last election	5 seats, 25.6%	11 seats, 43.6%	6 seats, 22.6%
Seats before	20	25	20
Seats won	12	8	3
Seats after	24	27	15
Seat change	▲4	▲2	▼5
Popular vote	58,715	50,206	35,168
Percentage	37.6%	32.1%	22.5%
Swing	▲12.0%	▼11.5%	▼0.1%
- Map of results of 2010 election
Leader of the Council before election
Steve Foulkes (Labour)
No Overall Control
Leader of the Council after election
Jeff Green (Conservative)
No Overall Control

The 2010 Wirral Metropolitan Borough Council election took place on 6 May 2010 to elect members of Wirral Metropolitan Borough Council in England. This election was held on the same day as other local elections.

The council stayed under no overall control, with the Conservatives becoming the largest single party, and resulted in a new Lib-Con coalition.

After the election, the composition of the council was:

Party	Seats	±
Conservative	27	▲2
Labour	24	▲4
Liberal Democrat	15	▼5
Ind. Conservative	0	▼1

== Election results ==
=== Overall election result ===
Overall result compared with 2008.

Wirral Metropolitan Borough Council election result, 2010
Party	Candidates						Votes		
Party	Stood	Elected	Gained	Unseated	Net	% of total	%	No.	Net %
Labour	23	12	4	0	▲4	54.5	37.6	58,715	▲12.0
Conservative	23	8	4	2	▲2	34.1	32.1	50,206	▼11.5
Liberal Democrats	23	3	0	5	▼5	11.4	22.5	35,168	▼0.1
Green	21	0	0	0	Steady	0.0	3.6	5,623	▼1.3
UKIP	19	0	0	0	Steady	0.0	3.4	5,307	▲1.0
BNP	5	0	0	0	Steady	0.0	0.9	1,339	▲0.3
Ind. Conservative	0	0	0	0	▼1	0.0	0.0	0	N/A

(Note: % of total refers to % of wards won.)

=== Changes in council composition ===
Prior to the election the composition of the council was:

↓
25	20	19	1	1
Con	Lab	Lib Dem	IC	V

After the election the composition of the council was:

↓
27	24	15
Con	Lab	Lib Dem

== Ward results ==
Results compared directly with the last local election in 2008.

=== Bebington ===
Bebington
Party	Candidate	Votes	%	±%
Labour	Walter Smith	3,822	45.9	▲9.7
Conservative	Kevin Sharkey	2,482	29.8	▼11.1
Liberal Democrats	Catherine Jennings	1,315	15.8	▲6.4
UKIP	Hilary Jones	520	6.2	▼3.9
Green	Michael Harper	186	2.2	▼1.2
Majority		1,340	16.1	N/A
Registered electors		11,793		
Turnout			71.4	▲31.3
Labour hold		Swing	▲10.4	

=== Bidston and St James ===
Bidston and St James
Party	Candidate	Votes	%	±%
Labour	Ann McLachlan	2,932	63.1	▲8.5
Liberal Democrats	John Brace	699	15.0	▲2.1
Conservative	John Gilbert	502	10.8	▼4.3
BNP	John Edwards	251	5.4	▼6.0
UKIP	Audrey Fitpatrick	154	3.3	New
Green	George Bowler	111	2.4	▼3.6
Majority		2,233	48.1	▲8.6
Registered electors		9,768		
Turnout			48.1	▲27.4
Labour hold		Swing	▲4.3	

=== Birkenhead and Tranmere ===
Birkenhead and Tranmere
Party	Candidate	Votes	%	±%
Labour	Brian Kenny	2,409	51.8	▼8.1
Green	Pat Cleary	1,095	23.6	▲12.1
Liberal Democrats	Peter Heppinstall	566	12.2	▼2.6
Conservative	June Cowin	380	8.2	▼5.7
UKIP	David Martin	198	4.3	New
Majority		1,314	28.2	▼16.9
Registered electors		9,956		
Turnout			47.3	▲26.5
Labour hold		Swing	▼8.5	

=== Bromborough ===
Bromborough
Party	Candidate	Votes	%	±%
Labour	Irene Williams	3,016	44.6	▲21.2
Liberal Democrats	Madeline Booth	1,815	26.9	▼15.9
Conservative	Sue Colquhoun	1,428	21.1	▼0.2
BNP	David Bell	328	4.9	▼2.3
Green	Percy Hogg	132	2.5	▼1.3
Majority		1,201	17.7	N/A
Registered electors		10,758		
Turnout			63.7	▲31.1
Labour gain from Liberal Democrats		Swing	▲18.6	

=== Clatterbridge ===
Clatterbridge
Party	Candidate	Votes	%	±%
Conservative	Peter Kearney	3,733	43.4	▼11.8
Liberal Democrats	Simon Thomson	2,313	26.9	▼2.4
Labour	Audrey Moore	2,015	23.4	▲12.4
UKIP	Roger Jones	361	4.2	▲2.1
Green	Jim McGinley	187	2.2	▼0.2
Majority		1,420	16.5	▼9.4
Registered electors		11,706		
Turnout			74.7	▲29.3
Conservative gain from Liberal Democrats		Swing	▼4.7	

=== Claughton ===
Claughton
Party	Candidate	Votes	%	±%
Labour	Denise Roberts	3,521	51.5	▲0.4
Conservative	Barbara Sinclair	1,574	23.0	▼5.9
Liberal Democrats	Margaret Teggin	1,182	17.3	▲2.8
UKIP	Bethan Williams	319	4.7	New
Green	Cathy Page	240	3.5	▼1.9
Majority		1,947	28.5	▲6.3
Registered electors		11,340		
Turnout			61.0	▲31.6
Labour hold		Swing	▲3.2	

=== Eastham ===
Eastham
Party	Candidate	Votes	%	±%
Liberal Democrats	Tom Harney	3,824	50.0	▼21.3
Labour	Willow Colios	1,942	25.4	▲15.7
Conservative	Nick Whieldon	1,644	21.5	▲5.6
UKIP	Laurence Jones	241	3.1	New
Majority		1,882	24.6	▼30.8
Registered electors		11,095		
Turnout			69.2	▲30.9
Liberal Democrats hold		Swing	▼15.4	

=== Greasby, Frankby and Irby ===
Greasby, Frankby and Irby
Party	Candidate	Votes	%	±%
Conservative	Wendy Clements	3,538	40.3	▼2.9
Liberal Democrats	Alaine Christian	2,949	33.5	▼11.1
Labour	Geoffrey Dormand	1,800	20.5	▲11.1
UKIP	Derek Snowden	287	3.3	New
Green	Michael Gardner	216	2.5	▼0.3
Majority		589	6.8	N/A
Registered electors		11,611		
Turnout			76.0	▲30.7
Conservative gain from Liberal Democrats		Swing	▲4.1	

=== Heswall ===
Heswall
Party	Candidate	Votes	%	±%
Conservative	Les Rowlands	5,000	59.1	▼14.6
Liberal Democrats	Alexander Clark	1,534	18.1	▲7.6
Labour	Yvonne Nolan	1,465	17.3	▲8.0
Green	Matthew Rosseinsky	251	3.0	▼1.5
UKIP	Oliver Sayle-Adam	213	2.5	▲0.4
Majority		3,466	41.0	▼22.2
Registered electors		10,992		
Turnout			77.4	▲33.1
Conservative hold		Swing	▼11.1	

=== Hoylake and Meols ===
Hoylake and Meols
Party	Candidate	Votes	%	±%
Conservative	Eddie Boult	3,748	49.3	▼15.5
Labour	Paul Doughty	1,848	24.3	▲8.4
Liberal Democrats	Mark Corran	1,417	18.6	▲10.3
Green	Yvonne McGinley	397	5.2	▼5.8
UKIP	Frank Whitham	197	2.6	New
Majority		1,900	25.0	▼23.9
Registered electors		10,457		
Turnout			73.3	▲32.5
Conservative gain from Ind. Conservative		Swing	▼12.0	

=== Leasowe and Moreton East ===
Leasowe and Moreton East
Party	Candidate	Votes	%	±%
Labour	Ann McArdle	3,404	51.9	▲17.0
Conservative	Steve Smith	1,948	29.7	▼21.7
Liberal Democrats	Gerald Hainsworth	866	13.2	▲7.6
UKIP	Russell Jones	216	3.3	New
Green	Shirley Johnson	129	2.0	▼2.3
Majority		1,456	22.2	N/A
Registered electors		10,905		
Turnout			60.7	▲24.5
Labour hold		Swing	▲19.4	

=== Liscard ===
Liscard
Party	Candidate	Votes	%	±%
Labour	Darren Dodd	3,220	46.8	▲13.8
Conservative	Leah Fraser	2,474	36.0	▼15.1
Liberal Democrats	Daniel Clein	718	10.4	▲5.7
UKIP	Lynda Williams	238	3.5	▼3.8
Green	John Bleasdale	231	3.4	▼0.4
Majority		746	10.8	N/A
Registered electors		11,071		
Turnout			63.1	▲26.0
Labour gain from Conservative		Swing	▲14.5	

=== Moreton West and Saughall Massie ===
Moreton West and Saughall Massie
Party	Candidate	Votes	%	±%
Conservative	Simon Mountney	2,976	41.5	▼29.6
Labour	Deirdre Wood	2,635	36.7	▲20.4
Liberal Democrats	Eric Copestake	992	13.8	▲8.1
UKIP	Susan Whitham	236	3.3	▼0.2
BNP	Brian Winson	223	3.1	New
Green	Perle Sheldricks	113	1.6	▼1.7
Majority		341	4.8	▼50.0
Registered electors		10,824		
Turnout			66.7	▲28.8
Conservative hold		Swing	▼25.0	

=== New Brighton ===
New Brighton
Party	Candidate	Votes	%	±%
Labour	Patricia Glasman	3,072	44.0	▲6.6
Conservative	Bill Duffey	2,173	31.2	▼16.3
Liberal Democrats	Julia Codling	1,166	16.7	▲10.1
Green	Cynthia Stonall	342	4.9	▼3.6
UKIP	Timothy Pass	222	3.2	New
Majority		899	12.8	N/A
Registered electors		11,025		
Turnout			63.6	▲25.0
Labour gain from Conservative		Swing	▲11.5	

=== Oxton ===
Oxton
Party	Candidate	Votes	%	±%
Liberal Democrats	Alan Brighouse	2,941	40.5	▼12.7
Labour	David Barden	2,310	31.8	▲14.7
Conservative	Tina McDonnell	1,425	19.6	▲1.2
UKIP	Catherine Williams	301	4.2	▼0.8
Green	Garnette Bowler	276	3.8	▼0.1
Majority		631	8.7	▼23.7
Registered electors		11,237		
Turnout			65.1	▲32.7
Liberal Democrats hold		Swing	▼11.9	

=== Pensby and Thingwall ===
Pensby and Thingwall
Party	Candidate	Votes	%	±%
Liberal Democrats	Mark Johnston (Note: Elected to serve a 4-year term.)	2,854	35.8	▼7.9
Conservative	Don McCubbin (Note: Elected to serve a 1-year term.)	2,479	31.1	▼7.1
Liberal Democrats	Michael Redfern	2,297	–	–
Conservative	Adam Sykes	2,103	–	–
Labour	Michael Sullivan	1,673	21.0	▲9.1
Labour	Sylvia Hodrien	1,517	–	–
UKIP	Janet Davison	518	6.5	▲3.1
Green	Allen Burton	448	5.6	▲2.8
Majority		375	4.7	▼0.8
Registered electors		10,666		
Turnout			71.5	▲26.9
Liberal Democrats hold		Swing	▼0.4	
Conservative gain from Liberal Democrats		Swing	–	

=== Prenton ===
Prenton
Party	Candidate	Votes	%	±%
Labour	Denise Realey	2,827	39.6	▲15.7
Liberal Democrats	Frank Doyle	2,258	31.6	▼16.9
Conservative	Robert Hughes	1,316	18.4	▼2.5
UKIP	Bruce Cain	369	5.2	New
BNP		219	3.1	New
Green	Mark Mitchell	150	2.1	▼2.0
Majority		569	8.0	N/A
Registered electors		11,039		
Turnout			64.9	▲30.4
Labour gain from Liberal Democrats		Swing	▲16.3	

=== Rock Ferry ===
Rock Ferry
Party	Candidate	Votes	%	±%
Labour	Moira McLaughlin	2,915	59.7	▲4.5
Liberal Democrats	Lynne Short	791	16.2	▲1.4
Conservative	Rachel Suffield	694	14.2	▼6.3
BNP	Janice Brady	318	6.5	New
Green	Joyce Hogg	162	3.3	▼6.2
Majority		2,124	43.5	▲8.8
Registered electors		9,829		
Turnout			50.6	▲26.5
Labour hold		Swing	▲4.4	

=== Seacombe ===
Seacombe
Party	Candidate	Votes	%	±%
Labour	Adrian Jones	3,349	62.8	▲11.8
Conservative	Tony Cox	916	17.2	▼4.6
Liberal Democrats	Steve Pitt	725	13.6	▲1.5
UKIP	Christopher Wellstead	238	4.5	▼5.9
Green	Jacqueline Smith	109	2.0	▼2.6
Majority		2,433	45.6	▲16.4
Registered electors		10,357		
Turnout			52.4	▲30.0
Labour hold		Swing	▲8.2	

=== Upton ===
Upton
Party	Candidate	Votes	%	±%
Labour	Stuart Whittingham	3,827	50.2	▲8.2
Conservative	Geoff Gubb	2,143	28.1	▼14.0
Liberal Democrats	Alan Davies	1,370	18.0	▲7.8
Green	Lesley Hussenbux	286	3.8	▼2.0
Majority		1,684	22.1	N/A
Registered electors		12,214		
Turnout			62.9	▲26.7
Labour hold		Swing	▲11.1	

=== Wallasey ===
Wallasey
Party	Candidate	Votes	%	±%
Conservative	Lesley Rennie	3,623	42.8	▼21.4
Labour	Christine Jones	3,082	36.4	▲16.5
Liberal Democrats	John Codling	1,269	15.0	▲6.5
UKIP	Ian Watson	255	3.0	▼0.7
Green	James Brady	234	2.8	▼0.8
Majority		541	6.4	▼37.9
Registered electors		12,061		
Turnout			70.9	▲30.7
Conservative hold		Swing	▼19.0	

=== West Kirby and Thurstaston ===
West Kirby and Thurstaston
Party	Candidate	Votes	%	±%
Conservative	Jeff Green	4,010	51.7	▼12.9
Labour	Lee Rushworth	1,631	21.0	▲7.9
Liberal Democrats	John Cresswell	1,604	20.7	▲8.6
Green	Hara Willow	290	3.7	▼2.9
UKIP	Philip Griffiths	224	2.9	▼0.7
Majority		2,379	30.7	▼20.8
Registered electors		10,348		
Turnout			75.4	▲29.7
Conservative hold		Swing	▼10.4	

== Notes ==
• italics denote the sitting councillor • bold denotes the winning candidate
