= Eastham (ward) =

Electoral ward of Wirral, Merseyside, England

Eastham (previously South Bromborough and Eastham, 1973 to 1979) is a Wirral Metropolitan Borough Council ward in the Wirral South Parliamentary constituency.

== Councillors ==
Election	Councillor (Party)	Councillor (Party)	Councillor (Party)	Ref.
1973	Gill (Labour)	M. Halliday (Labour)	Bill Lungley (Labour)	
1975	Gill (Labour)	M. Halliday (Labour)	David Allan (Conservative)	
1976	Gill (Labour)	D. Jones (Conservative)	David Allan (Conservative)	
1977 by-election	Phil Gilchrist (Liberal/Alliance/Liberal Democrats)	D. Jones (Conservative)	David Allan (Conservative)	
1978	Phil Gilchrist (Liberal/Alliance/Liberal Democrats)	D. Jones (Conservative)	David Allan (Conservative)	
1979	Phil Gilchrist (Liberal/Alliance/Liberal Democrats)	D. Jones (Conservative)	David Allan (Conservative)	
1980	Phil Gilchrist (Liberal/Alliance/Liberal Democrats)	A. Varley (Conservative)	David Allan (Conservative)	
1982	Phil Gilchrist (Liberal/Alliance/Liberal Democrats)	A. Varley (Conservative)	David Allan (Conservative)	
1983	Phil Gilchrist (Liberal/Alliance/Liberal Democrats)	A. Varley (Conservative)	Dave Mitchell (Alliance/Liberal Democrats)	
1984	Phil Gilchrist (Liberal/Alliance/Liberal Democrats)	D. Charles (Alliance)	Dave Mitchell (Alliance/Liberal Democrats)	
1986	Phil Gilchrist (Liberal/Alliance/Liberal Democrats)	D. Charles (Alliance)	Dave Mitchell (Alliance/Liberal Democrats)	
1987	Phil Gilchrist (Liberal/Alliance/Liberal Democrats)	D. Charles (Alliance)	Dave Mitchell (Alliance/Liberal Democrats)	
1988	Phil Gilchrist (Liberal/Alliance/Liberal Democrats)	Colin Dow (Labour)	Dave Mitchell (Alliance/Liberal Democrats)	
1990	Vera Ruck (Labour/Conservative)	Colin Dow (Labour)	Dave Mitchell (Alliance/Liberal Democrats)	
1991	Vera Ruck (Labour/Conservative)	Colin Dow (Labour)	Dave Mitchell (Alliance/Liberal Democrats)	
1992	Vera Ruck (Labour/Conservative)	Phil Gilchrist (Liberal Democrats)	Dave Mitchell (Alliance/Liberal Democrats)	
1994	Tom Harney (Liberal Democrats)	Phil Gilchrist (Liberal Democrats)	Dave Mitchell (Alliance/Liberal Democrats)	
1995	Tom Harney (Liberal Democrats)	Phil Gilchrist (Liberal Democrats)	Dave Mitchell (Alliance/Liberal Democrats)	
1996	Tom Harney (Liberal Democrats)	Phil Gilchrist (Liberal Democrats)	Dave Mitchell (Alliance/Liberal Democrats)	
1998	Tom Harney (Liberal Democrats)	Phil Gilchrist (Liberal Democrats)	Dave Mitchell (Alliance/Liberal Democrats)	
1999	Tom Harney (Liberal Democrats)	Phil Gilchrist (Liberal Democrats)	Dave Mitchell (Alliance/Liberal Democrats)	
2000	Tom Harney (Liberal Democrats)	Phil Gilchrist (Liberal Democrats)	Dave Mitchell (Alliance/Liberal Democrats)	
2002	Tom Harney (Liberal Democrats)	Phil Gilchrist (Liberal Democrats)	Dave Mitchell (Alliance/Liberal Democrats)	
2003	Tom Harney (Liberal Democrats)	Phil Gilchrist (Liberal Democrats)	Dave Mitchell (Alliance/Liberal Democrats)	
2004	Tom Harney (Liberal Democrats)	Phil Gilchrist (Liberal Democrats)	Dave Mitchell (Alliance/Liberal Democrats)	
2006	Tom Harney (Liberal Democrats)	Phil Gilchrist (Liberal Democrats)	Dave Mitchell (Alliance/Liberal Democrats)	
2007	Tom Harney (Liberal Democrats)	Phil Gilchrist (Liberal Democrats)	Dave Mitchell (Alliance/Liberal Democrats)	
2008	Tom Harney (Liberal Democrats)	Phil Gilchrist (Liberal Democrats)	Dave Mitchell (Alliance/Liberal Democrats)	
2010	Tom Harney (Liberal Democrats)	Phil Gilchrist (Liberal Democrats)	Dave Mitchell (Alliance/Liberal Democrats)	
2011	Tom Harney (Liberal Democrats)	Phil Gilchrist (Liberal Democrats)	Dave Mitchell (Alliance/Liberal Democrats)	
2012	Tom Harney (Liberal Democrats)	Phil Gilchrist (Liberal Democrats)	Dave Mitchell (Alliance/Liberal Democrats)	
2014	Chris Carubia (Liberal Democrats)	Phil Gilchrist (Liberal Democrats)	Dave Mitchell (Alliance/Liberal Democrats)	
2015	Chris Carubia (Liberal Democrats)	Phil Gilchrist (Liberal Democrats)	Dave Mitchell (Alliance/Liberal Democrats)	
2016	Chris Carubia (Liberal Democrats)	Phil Gilchrist (Liberal Democrats)	Dave Mitchell (Alliance/Liberal Democrats)	
2018	Chris Carubia (Liberal Democrats)	Phil Gilchrist (Liberal Democrats)	Dave Mitchell (Alliance/Liberal Democrats)	
2019	Chris Carubia (Liberal Democrats)	Phil Gilchrist (Liberal Democrats)	Dave Mitchell (Alliance/Liberal Democrats)	
2021	Chris Carubia (Liberal Democrats)	Phil Gilchrist (Liberal Democrats)	Dave Mitchell (Alliance/Liberal Democrats)	
2022	Chris Carubia (Liberal Democrats)	Phil Gilchrist (Liberal Democrats)	Dave Mitchell (Alliance/Liberal Democrats)	
