= Liscard (ward) =

Electoral ward of Wirral, in Merseyside, England

Liscard (previously Marlowe-Egremont-South Liscard, 1973–1979) is a Wirral Metropolitan Borough Council ward in the Wallasey Parliamentary constituency.

== Councillors ==
Election	Councillor (Party)	Councillor (Party)	Councillor (Party)	Ref.
1973	S. Morgan (Conservative)	M. Ebbs (Conservative)	Lynn (Conservative)	
1975	S. Morgan (Conservative)	M. Ebbs (Conservative)	John Hale (Conservative)	
1976	S. Morgan (Conservative)	M. Ebbs (Conservative)	John Hale (Conservative)	
1978	S. Morgan (Conservative)	M. Ebbs (Conservative)	John Hale (Conservative)	
1979	S. Morgan (Conservative)	M. Ebbs (Conservative)	John Hale (Conservative)	
1980	S. Morgan (Conservative)	M. Ebbs (Conservative)	John Hale (Conservative)	
1982	S. Morgan (Conservative)	M. Ebbs (Conservative)	John Hale (Conservative)	
1983	S. Morgan (Conservative)	M. Ebbs (Conservative)	John Hale (Conservative)	
1984	S. Morgan (Conservative)	M. Ebbs (Conservative)	John Hale (Conservative)	
1986	Gordon Paterson (Labour)	M. Ebbs (Conservative)	John Hale (Conservative)	
1987	Gordon Paterson (Labour)	M. Ebbs (Conservative)	John Hale (Conservative)	
1988	Gordon Paterson (Labour)	E. Smith (Labour)	John Hale (Conservative)	
1990	Gordon Paterson (Labour)	E. Smith (Labour)	John Hale (Conservative)	
1991	Gordon Paterson (Labour)	E. Smith (Labour)	E. Williams (Labour)	
1992	Gordon Paterson (Labour)	M. Ebbs (Conservative)	E. Williams (Labour)	
1994	Gordon Paterson (Labour)	M. Ebbs (Conservative)	E. Williams (Labour)	
1995	Gordon Paterson (Labour)	M. Ebbs (Conservative)	John Cocker (Labour)	
1996	Gordon Paterson (Labour)	Denis Knowles (Labour)	John Cocker (Labour)	
1998	Gordon Paterson (Labour)	Denis Knowles (Labour)	John Cocker (Labour)	
1999	Gordon Paterson (Labour)	Denis Knowles (Labour)	John Cocker (Labour)	
2000	Gordon Paterson (Labour)	Alan Robinson (Conservative)	John Cocker (Labour)	
2002	David Hawkins (Labour)	Alan Robinson (Conservative)	John Cocker (Labour)	
2003	David Hawkins (Labour)	Alan Robinson (Conservative)	Leah Fraser (Conservative)	
2004	David Hawkins (Labour)	Gary Leech (Labour)	Chris Jones (Labour)	
2006	David Hawkins (Labour)	Gary Leech (Labour)	Leah Fraser (Conservative)	
2007	David Hawkins (Labour)	Karen Hayes (Conservative)	Leah Fraser (Conservative)	
2008	James Keeley (Conservative)	Karen Hayes (Conservative)	Leah Fraser (Conservative)	
2010	James Keeley (Conservative)	Karen Hayes (Conservative)	Darren Dodd (Labour)	
2011	James Keeley (Conservative)	Bernie Mooney (Labour)	Darren Dodd (Labour)	
2012	Janette Williamson (Labour)	Bernie Mooney (Labour)	Darren Dodd (Labour)	
2014	Janette Williamson (Labour)	Bernie Mooney (Labour)	Matthew Daniel (Labour)	
2015	Janette Williamson (Labour)	Bernie Mooney (Labour)	Matthew Daniel (Labour)	
2016	Janette Williamson (Labour)	Bernie Mooney (Labour)	Tom Usher (Labour)	
2018	Janette Williamson (Labour)	Bernie Mooney (Labour)	Tom Usher (Labour)	
2019	Janette Williamson (Labour)	Sarah Spoor (Labour)	Tom Usher (Labour)	
2021	Janette Williamson (Labour)	Sarah Spoor (Labour)	David Brennan (Labour)	
2021 by-election	Janette Williamson (Labour)	Daisy Kenny (Labour)	David Brennan (Labour)	
2022	Janette Williamson (Labour)	Daisy Kenny (Labour)	David Brennan (Labour)	
2022 by-election	Janette Williamson (Labour)	Daisy Kenny (Labour)	James Laing (Labour)	
