= 2019 Wirral Metropolitan Borough Council election =

2019 local election in England

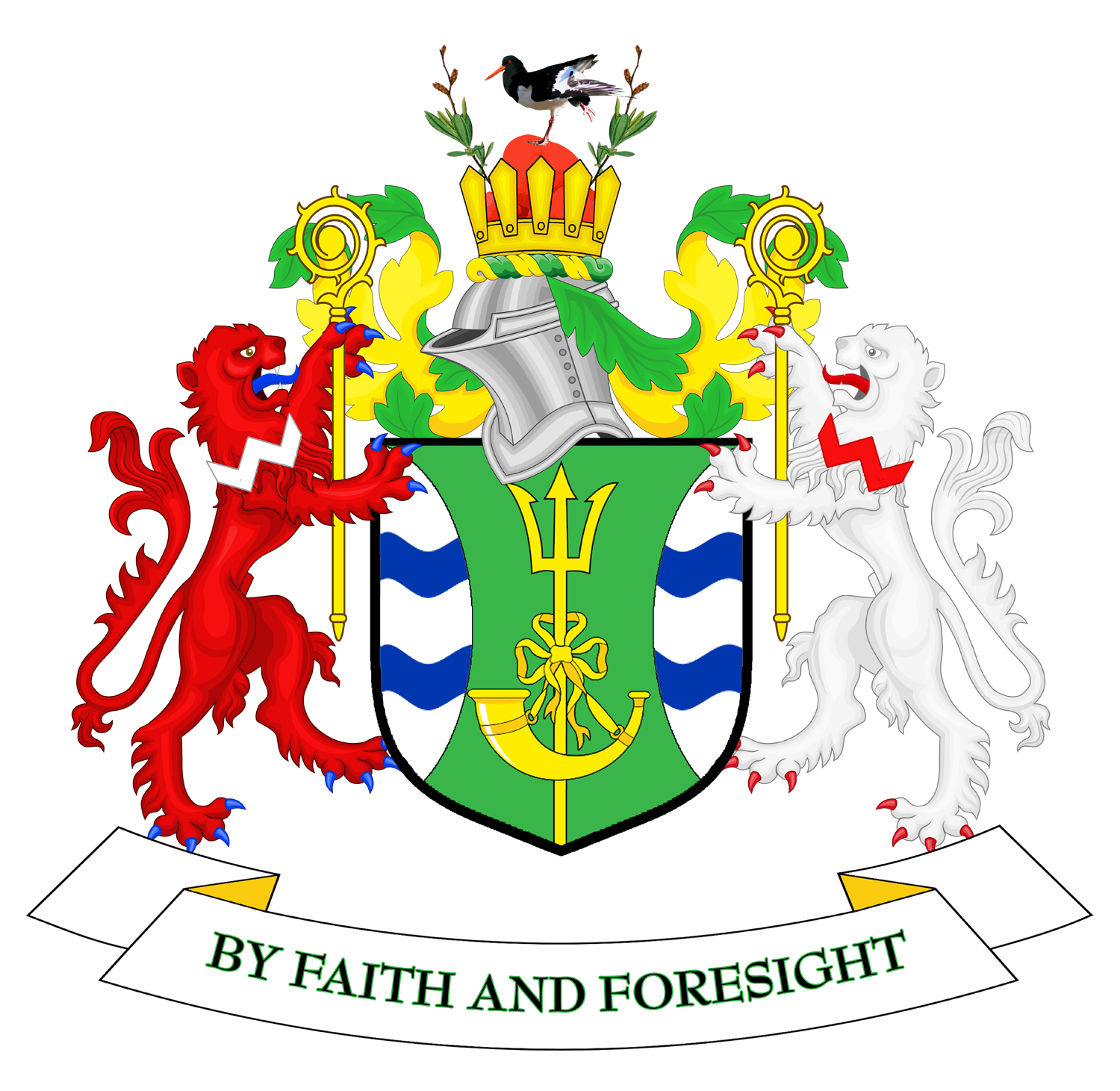
- 2 May 2019

22 of 66 seats (One Third) to Wirral Metropolitan Borough Council 34 seats needed for a majority
- Turnout: 37.1% (▲0.8%)
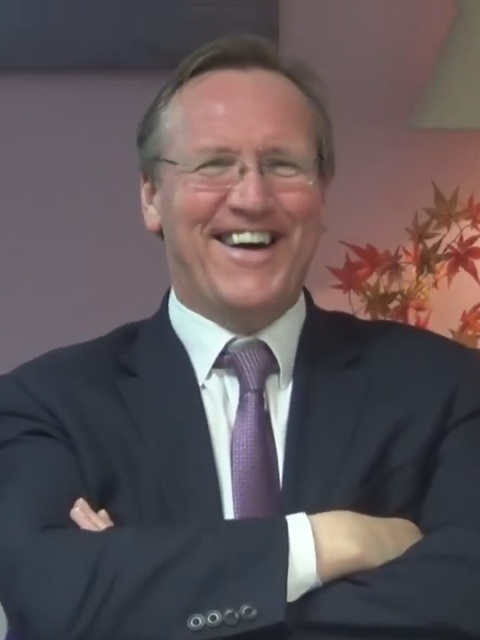

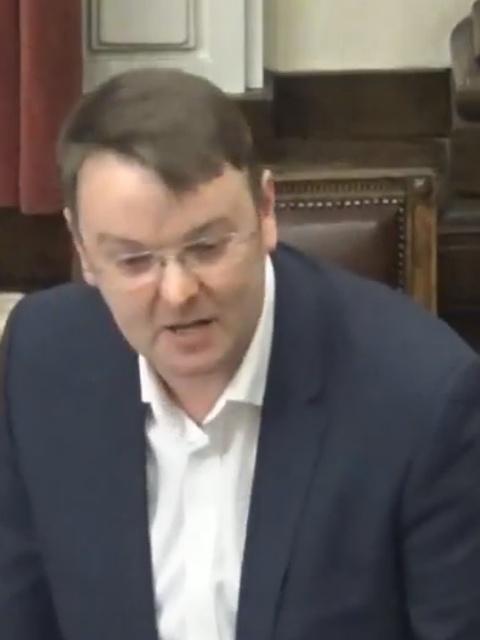

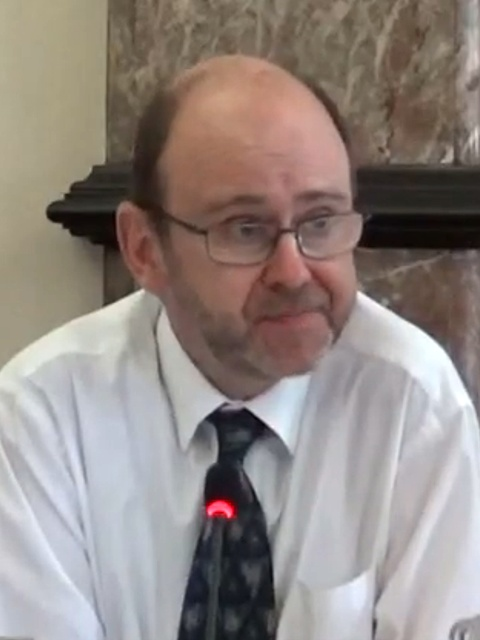

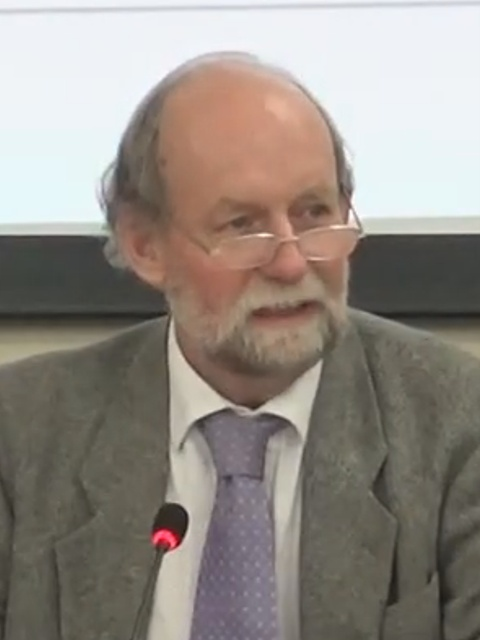
	First party	Second party
Leader	Phil Davies	Ian Lewis
Party	Labour	Conservative
Leader since	29 March 2012	8 May 2017
Leader's seat	Birkenhead and Tranmere	Wallasey
Last election	12 seats, 45.5%	8 seats, 35.3%
Seats before	34	21
Seats won	10	8
Seats after	32	22
Seat change	▼2	▲1
Popular vote	31,778	28,467
Percentage	35.8%	32.1%
Swing	▼9.7%	▼3.2%
	Third party	Fourth party
Leader	Pat Cleary (Note: As the only Green on the council prior to the election, Pat Cleary was their de facto group leader.)	Phil Gilchrist
Party	Green	Liberal Democrats
Leader since	22 May 2014	16 May 2013
Leader's seat	Birkenhead and Tranmere	Eastham
Last election	1 seat, 8.6%	2 seats, 10.2%
Seats before	1	5
Seats won	2	2
Seats after	3	6
Seat change	▲2	▲1
Popular vote	14,803	10,283
Percentage	16.7%	11.6%
Swing	▲8.1%	▲1.4%
- Map of results of 2019 election
Leader of the Council before election
Phil Davies
Labour
Leader of the Council after election
Pat Hackett (Labour)
No Overall Control

The 2019 Wirral Metropolitan Borough Council election took place on 2 May 2019 to elect members of Wirral Metropolitan Borough Council in England. This election was held on the same day as other local elections.

After the election, the composition of the council was:

Party	Seats	±
Labour	32	▼2
Conservative	22	▲1
Liberal Democrat	6	▲1
Green	3	▲2
Independent	3	▼2
Source: The Guardian

== Election results ==
=== Overall election result ===
Overall result compared with 2018.

Wirral Metropolitan Borough Council election result, 2019
Party	Candidates						Votes		
Party	Stood	Elected	Gained	Unseated	Net	% of total	%	No.	Net %
Labour	22	10	1	3	▼2	45.5	35.8	31,778	▼9.7
Conservative	22	8	1	0	▲1	36.4	32.1	28,467	▼3.2
Green	21	2	2	0	▲2	9.1	16.7	14,803	▲8.1
Liberal Democrats	16	2	1	0	▲1	9.1	11.6	10,283	▲1.4
UKIP	7	0	0	0	Steady	0.0	2.5	2,182	▲2.4
Independent	2	0	0	0	▼2	0.0	1.4	1,203	▲1.3

=== Results by constituency ===
==== Birkenhead constituency ====
Birkenhead consists of the wards of Bidston and St James, Birkenhead and Tranmere, Claughton, Oxton, Prenton and Rock Ferry.

Wirral Metropolitan Borough Council Election Results, 2019 (Birkenhead)
Party	Candidates						Votes		
Party	Stood	Elected	Gained	Unseated	Net	% of total	%	No.	Net %
Labour	6	3	1	2	▼1	50.0	39.5	8,271	▼15.2
Green	5	2	2	0	▲2	33.3	29.8	6,239	▲10.6
Liberal Democrats	3	1	1	0	▲1	16.7	15.1	3,167	▲1.0
Conservative	6	0	0	0	Steady	0.0	6.9	1,447	▼4.4
Independent	2	0	0	2	▼2	0.0	5.7	1,203	N/A
UKIP	2	0	0	0	Steady	0.0	3.0	631	N/A

==== Wallasey constituency ====
Wallasey consists of the wards of Leasowe and Moreton East, Liscard, Moreton West and Saughall Massie, New Brighton, Seacombe and Wallasey.

Wirral Metropolitan Borough Council Election Results, 2019 (Wallasey)
Party	Candidates						Votes		
Party	Stood	Elected	Gained	Unseated	Net	% of total	%	No.	Net %
Labour	6	4	0	0	Steady	66.7	44.0	10,143	▼8.2
Conservative	6	2	0	0	Steady	33.3	36.8	8,486	▼1.3
Green	6	0	0	0	Steady	0.0	10.0	2,310	▲5.2
UKIP	4	0	0	0	Steady	0.0	5.2	1,202	▲4.7
Liberal Democrats	4	0	0	0	Steady	0.0	4.0	925	Steady

==== Wirral South constituency ====
Wirral South consists of the wards of Bebington, Bromborough, Clatterbridge, Eastham, and Heswall.

Wirral Metropolitan Borough Council Election Results, 2019 (Wirral South)
Party	Candidates						Votes		
Party	Stood	Elected	Gained	Unseated	Net	% of total	%	No.	Net %
Conservative	5	2	0	0	Steady	40.0	35.8	7,757	▼3.7
Labour	5	2	0	0	Steady	40.0	32.2	6,970	▼8.2
Liberal Democrats	4	1	0	0	Steady	20.0	19.4	4,196	▲3.7
Green	5	0	0	0	Steady	0.0	12.6	2,726	▲8.2

==== Wirral West constituency ====
Wirral West consists of the wards of Greasby, Frankby and Irby, Hoylake and Meols, Pensby and Thingwall, Upton, and West Kirby and Thurstaston.

Wirral Metropolitan Borough Council Election Results, 2019 (Wirral West)
Party	Candidates						Votes		
Party	Stood	Elected	Gained	Unseated	Net	% of total	%	No.	Net %
Conservative	5	4	1	0	▲1	80.0	46.8	10,777	▼3.2
Labour	5	1	0	1	▼1	20.0	27.7	6,394	▼7.3
Green	5	0	0	0	Steady	0.0	15.3	3,528	▲8.5
Liberal Democrats	5	0	0	0	Steady	0.0	8.7	1,995	▲0.9
UKIP	1	0	0	0	Steady	0.0	1.5	349	N/A

=== Changes in council composition ===
Prior to the election the composition of the council was:

↓
34	21	5	1	5
Lab	Con	LD	G	Ind

After the election the composition of the council was:

↓
32	22	6	3	3
Lab	Con	LD	G	I

Wirral Metropolitan Borough Council composition after the 2019 election

=== Votes summary ===
Popular vote
Labour	35.8%
Conservative	32.1%
Green	16.7%
Liberal Democrats	11.6%
UKIP	2.5%
Independent	1.4%

=== Seats summary ===
Wards won
Labour	45.5%
Conservative	36.4%
Green	9.1%
Liberal Democrats	9.1%
Others	0.0%

=== Proportionality ===
The disproportionality of the 2019 election was 9.56 using the Gallagher Index.

Political Party	Vote Share	Seat Share	Difference	Difference²
Labour	35.82	45.45	9.63	92.74
Conservative	32.09	36.36	4.27	18.23
Green	16.69	9.09	7.60	57.76
Liberal Democrat	11.59	9.09	2.50	6.25
UKIP	2.46	0.00	2.46	6.05
Independent	1.36	0.00	1.36	1.85
			TOTAL	182.88
			TOTAL /2	91.44
			$\sqrt{\frac{\text{TOTAL}}{2}}$	9.56

== Parties and candidates ==
=== Contesting political parties ===
Party	Leader	Leader since	Leader's ward	Up for re-election?	Last election		This election	
Party	Leader	Leader since	Leader's ward	Up for re-election?	% of votes	Wards	Defending	Prior Composition
Labour	Phil Davies (outgoing)	29 March 2012	Birkenhead and Tranmere	✓ (Note: Not seeking re-election.)	45.5%	12	12	34 / 66
Conservative	Ian Lewis	8 May 2017	Wallasey	✗	35.3%	7	7	21 / 66
Liberal Democrats	Phil Gilchrist	16 May 2013	Eastham	✗	10.2%	2	1	5 / 66
Green	Pat Cleary	22 May 2014	Birkenhead and Tranmere	✗	8.6%	1	0	1 / 66
Independent	Moira McLaughlin	22 February 2019	Rock Ferry	✗	0.1%	0	2 (Note: Not contesting Oxton.)	5 / 66

At the last regular election (2018), The Conservatives, Greens and Labour all ran a full slate of candidates with the Liberal Democrats contesting all but one of the seats available with other parties only putting forward a handful of candidates between them.

=== Candidate selection ===
The Green Party selected Steve Hayes on 13 June 2018 to contest the seat of Birkenhead and Tranmere after Pat Cleary was re-elected in May.

On 17 September, incumbent Hoylake and Meols councillor of 20 years Gerry Ellis announced that he had been deselected by the Conservative Party. Ellis appealed against the deselection, claiming he had been "unlawfully" discriminated against because of his age. In December, Alison Wright was announced as the new Conservative candidate.

On 17 October, Phil Davies announced in a party email that he would stand down as Council Leader in May as well as not seeking re-election for his Birkenhead and Tranmere seat after serving on Wirral Council for over 27 years.

Labour's selection process began in October with the left targeting seats such as Liscard, Bidston and St James, Pensby and Thingwall, Rock Ferry and New Brighton. Both Ron Abbey (Leasowe and Moreton East) and Chris Meaden (Rock Ferry) were not selected. Bernie Mooney's re-selection for Liscard was questioned due to apparent irregularities in the selection process. Her candidacy was upheld by the regional party. However, on 27 February she was found to be in breach of Labour rules and subsequently removed from the panel of candidates by the Local Campaign Forum.

TUSC suspended their electoral activity in November so did not put forward any candidates.

In January, Meaden resigned the Labour whip and sought re-election as an independent.

=== Target seats ===
Labour targeted Eastham and Wallasey and hoped to hold on to Pensby and Thingwall and Oxton, the latter of which was held by the Liberal Democrats in the subsequent two elections.

The Conservatives' main target seat was Pensby and Thingwall, which they lost by just 23 votes in 2018.

The Liberal Democrats hoped to regain a third councillor in Oxton, and the Greens were looking to take a second in Birkenhead and Tranmere and to make headways in Prenton.

=== Campaign ===
On 26 March, Wirral Labour criticised the Conservatives for starting a crowdfunder page for the election which had, so far, raised £20. This came despite itself having used crowdfunding with Tory leader Ian Lewis saying that they [Labour] needed to "get with the programme".

Outgoing Oxton councillor Paul Doughty was suspended from Labour in April due to campaigning for the Independent Group.

Representatives from all four parties in Council as well as the Independent Group appeared on Sunday Politics North West on 7 April talking about the issues facing the election campaign. Particular attention was given to the Green belt as well as the alleged rifts in the local Labour Party.

Leasowe and Moreton East Conservative candidate Debbie Caplin was criticised by Labour for comments she made to The Observer in 2016 in which she described her hometown of Moreton as "horrible". Tory Leader Ian Lewis defended her comments as being taken out of context stating that "Debbie, her family and her neighbours had been let down by years of Labour neglect".

Greenbelt leak controversy

On Monday 8 April, a report leaked by Pensby and Thingwall councillor Phil Brightmore claimed that 20 Green belt sites ranging from 2 to 1,705 houses had been "saved" from development. However, the following day a statement released by Wirral Council dismissed that any sites had been removed from the list of [Green belt] sites identified for potential release.

Further leaked documents suggested that Labour were deciding on potential sites based on political preference.

A full list of 21 "accepted" sites published on 23 April was described by Liberal Democrat planning spokesperson Stuart Kelly as a "shabby back-room carve up of green belt sites based on what was politically advantageous to Labour".

=== Policies ===
A 12 April article in the Wirral Globe put forward each party's priorities for the election.

Labour

- Create 3,000 new jobs and apprenticeships through a regeneration programme
- Invest £1 million in Liscard and New Ferry
- Invest over £8 million on a highway improvements over the coming year
- Replace every street light with energy efficient bulbs
- Prioritise Brownfield sites for development

Conservative

- Push for a Local plan to protect the Green belt and direct investment toward Liscard and New Ferry
- Invest in highway maintenance and road safety
- Create jobs and apprenticeships
- Cut business rates and car parking charges
- Curb executive pay
- Scrap Wirral View
- Scrap the Leader and cabinet model in favour of a Committee system

Liberal Democrats

- "work together" to protect the Green belt as part of the creation of a Local plan
- Scrap Wirral View
- Curb executive pay
- Cancel Hoylake Golf Resort
- Support a People's Vote on Brexit

Green

- Ensure Local plan is "fit for purpose" by reducing the number of empty properties, maximizing Brownfield potential and protecting the Green belt
- Engage with developers to optimise "green potential" of Wirral Waters
- Declare a Climate Emergency and cut Wirral's Carbon footprint
- Scrap Wirral View
- Curb executive pay
- Cancel Hoylake Golf Resort
- Scrap the Leader and cabinet model in favour of a Committee system

== Retiring councillors ==
Ward	Departing Councillor	Party	Ref.
Birkenhead and Tranmere	Phil Davies	Labour	
Clatterbridge	Adam Sykes	Conservative	
Hoylake and Meols	Gerry Ellis	Conservative (deselected)	
Leasowe and Moreton East	Ron Abbey	Labour (deselected)	
Liscard	Bernie Mooney	Labour (deselected)	
Oxton	Paul Doughty	Independent	
West Kirby and Thurstaston	David Elderton	Conservative	

== Aftermath ==
Labour lost control of the Council losing two seats to the Greens and one to the Conservatives.

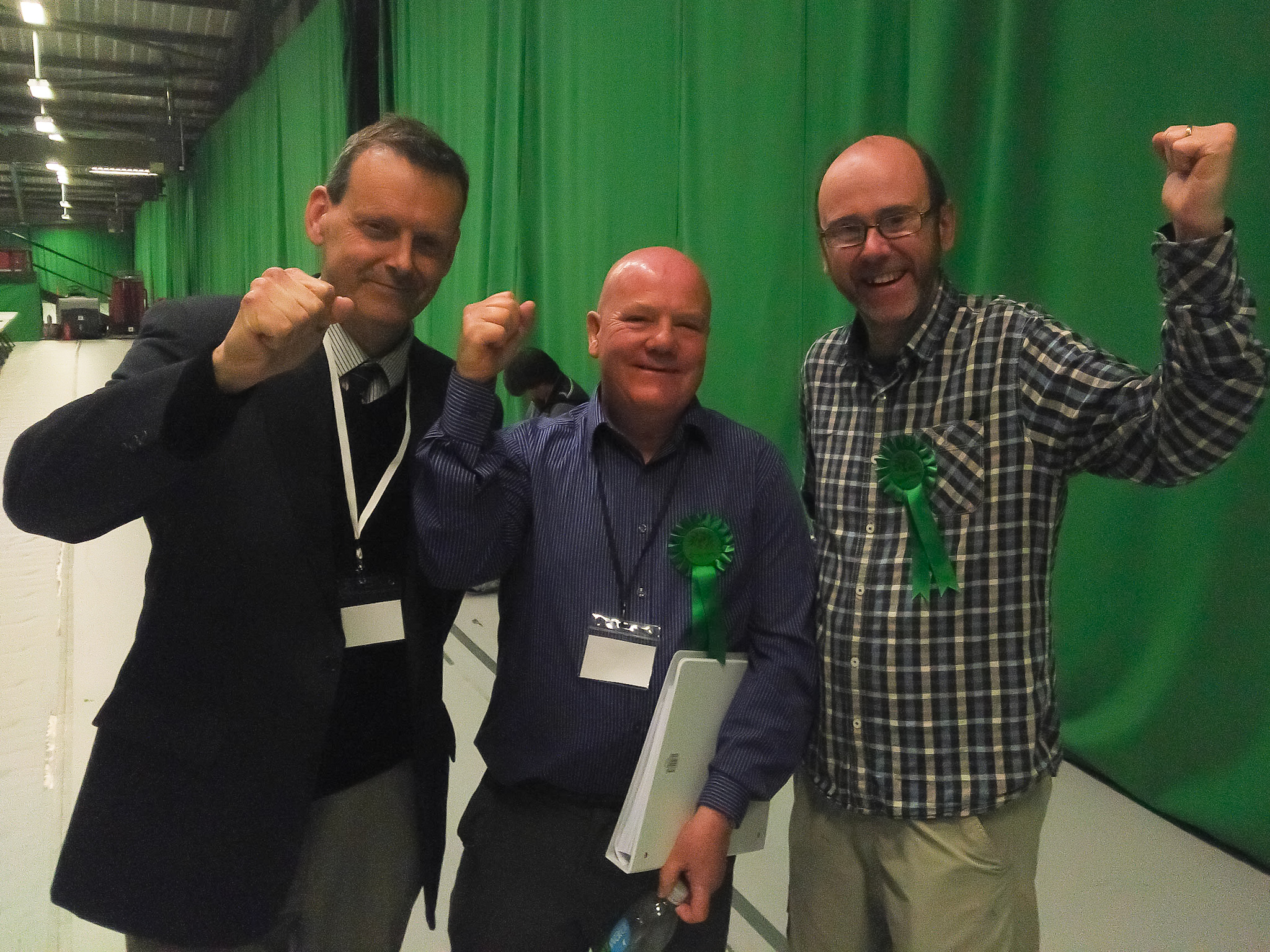
Green Councillors Cooke, Hayes and Cleary celebrate after election successes.

Labour councillors chose the new leader of their group Pat Hackett on 5 May. Hackett was elected Council leader on 14 May with 31 votes compared to 25 for Conservative leader Ian Lewis and 10 abstentions. The meeting also saw Labour lose their majority on every committee with chairs given to each opposition party.

== Ward results ==
Results compared directly with the last local election in 2018.

=== Bebington ===
Bebington
Party	Candidate	Votes	%	±%
Labour	Jerry Williams	2,210	50.1	▼9.5
Conservative	Geoff Jones	1,085	24.6	▼5.7
Liberal Democrats	Amanda Crowfoot	696	15.8	▲10.5
Green	Rachel Heydon	424	9.6	▲4.8
Majority		1,125	25.5	▼3.7
Registered electors		11,916		
Turnout		4,459	37.4	▲0.4
Rejected ballots		44	1.0	▲0.8
Labour hold		Swing	▼1.9	

=== Bidston and St James ===
Bidston and St James
Party	Candidate	Votes	%	±%
Labour	Brian Kenny	1,572	67.7	▼8.0
Green	James Parkhouse	353	15.2	▲10.4
Conservative	Vida Wilson	245	10.6	▼1.7
Liberal Democrats	Mike Parsons	151	6.5	▲2.8
Majority		1,219	52.2	▼10.9
Registered electors		10,330		
Turnout		2,368	22.9	▼1.1
Rejected ballots		47	2.0	▲1.8
Labour hold		Swing	▼5.5	

=== Birkenhead and Tranmere ===
Birkenhead and Tranmere
Party	Candidate	Votes	%	±%
Green	Steve Hayes	2,198	65.9	▲16.2
Labour	Bill McGenity	1,058	31.7	▼16.1
Conservative	June Cowin	78	2.3	▼0.2
Majority		1,140	34.2	▲32.3
Registered electors		10,109		
Turnout		3,360	33.2	▼3.7
Rejected ballots		26	0.8	▲0.6
Green gain from Labour		Swing	▲16.2	

=== Bromborough ===
Bromborough
Party	Candidate	Votes	%	±%
Labour	Joe Walsh	1,608	48.0	▼13.1
Conservative	Des Drury	728	21.7	▼0.4
Liberal Democrats	Vicky Downie	570	17.0	▲5.9
Green	Sheena Hatton	446	13.3	▲7.6
Majority		880	26.3	▼12.6
Registered electors		11,771		
Turnout		3,390	28.8	▼0.8
Rejected ballots		38	1.1	▲0.8
Labour hold		Swing	▼6.4	

=== Clatterbridge ===
Clatterbridge
Party	Candidate	Votes	%	±%
Conservative	Helen Cameron	2,608	53.2	▼2.1
Labour	Kieran Morgan	1,428	29.1	▼4.8
Green	Jim McGinley	865	17.6	▲13.3
Majority		1,180	24.1	▲2.6
Registered electors		11,401		
Turnout		4,960	43.5	▲0.5
Rejected ballots		59	1.2	▲1.0
Conservative hold		Swing	▲1.4	

=== Claughton ===
Claughton
Party	Candidate	Votes	%	±%
Labour	Stephen Foulkes	1,596	45.8	▼13.1
Conservative	Nicholas Hanna	544	15.6	▼6.9
Green	Liz Heydon	461	13.2	▲6.7
Liberal Democrats	Christopher Teggin	389	11.2	▼0.9
UKIP	Alex Fay	386	11.1	New
Independent	Mo Morgan	108	3.1	New
Majority		1,052	30.2	▼6.2
Registered electors		11,478		
Turnout		3,502	30.5	▼0.2
Rejected ballots		18	0.5	▲0.2
Labour hold		Swing	▼3.1	

=== Eastham ===
Eastham
Party	Candidate	Votes	%	±%
Liberal Democrats	Dave Mitchell	2,286	55.0	▲6.8
Labour	Ruth Molyneux	1,122	27.0	▼9.1
Conservative	Phil Merry	440	10.6	▼2.4
Green	Harry Gorman	311	7.5	▲4.8
Majority		1,164	28.0	▲15.9
Registered electors		11,007		
Turnout		4,192	38.1	▼0.7
Rejected ballots		33	0.8	▲0.6
Liberal Democrats hold		Swing	▲8.0	

=== Greasby, Frankby and Irby ===
Greasby, Frankby and Irby
Party	Candidate	Votes	%	±%
Conservative	David Burgess-Joyce	2,838	52.3	▼6.5
Labour	Tim Watson	958	17.6	▼6.3
Green	Cathy Page	688	12.7	▲9.3
Liberal Democrats	Mark Forshaw	597	11.0	▼2.8
UKIP	Jack Bland	349	6.4	New
Majority		1,880	34.6	▼0.3
Registered electors		11,481		
Turnout		5,447	47.4	▲2.3
Rejected ballots		17	0.3	▲0.2
Conservative hold		Swing	▼0.1	

=== Heswall ===
Heswall
Party	Candidate	Votes	%	±%
Conservative	Andrew Hodson	2,896	60.1	▼9.2
Green	Barbara Burton	680	14.1	▲9.2
Liberal Democrats	Robert Thompson	644	13.4	▲4.9
Labour	Brian Parsons	602	12.5	▼4.7
Majority		2,216	46.0	▼6.1
Registered electors		10,845		
Turnout		4,861	44.8	▲2.8
Rejected ballots		39	0.8	▲0.6
Conservative hold		Swing	▼3.1	

=== Hoylake and Meols ===
Hoylake and Meols
Party	Candidate	Votes	%	±%
Conservative	Alison Wright	2,265	50.3	▼3.6
Labour	Thomas Laing	997	22.1	▼7.6
Green	Alix Cockcroft	778	17.3	▲5.7
Liberal Democrats	Peter Reisdorf	465	10.3	▲3.7
Majority		1,268	28.1	▲4.4
Registered electors		10,463		
Turnout		4,554	43.5	▲0.6
Rejected ballots		49	1.1	▲0.8
Conservative hold		Swing	▲2.3	

=== Leasowe and Moreton East ===
Leasowe and Moreton East
Party	Candidate	Votes	%	±%
Labour	Karl Greaney	1,729	47.9	▼10.7
Conservative	Debbie Caplin	1,428	39.6	▲6.0
Green	Michael Dixon	453	12.5	▲9.2
Majority		301	8.3	▼16.7
Registered electors		10,806		
Turnout		3,649	33.8	▲1.0
Rejected ballots		39	1.1	▲0.8
Labour hold		Swing	▼8.4	

=== Liscard ===
Liscard
Party	Candidate	Votes	%	±%
Labour	Sarah Spoor	1,733	51.0	▼12.6
Conservative	Michael Taylor	609	17.9	▼3.6
UKIP	Rodney Melbourne	374	11.0	New
Green	Perle Sheldricks	360	10.6	▲5.2
Liberal Democrats	Sue Arrowsmith	319	9.4	▼0.2
Majority		1,124	33.1	▼9.0
Registered electors		11,095		
Turnout		3,431	30.9	▼1.0
Rejected ballots		36	1.0	▲0.5
Labour hold		Swing	▼4.5	

=== Moreton West and Saughall Massie ===
Moreton West and Saughall Massie
Party	Candidate	Votes	%	±%
Conservative	Steve Williams	2,738	63.4	▲1.8
Labour	Stan Webster	1,146	26.5	▼6.8
Green	Helen O'Donnell	330	7.6	▲4.5
Liberal Democrats	David Tyrrell	107	2.5	▲0.4
Majority		1,592	36.8	▲8.5
Registered electors		10,671		
Turnout		4,368	40.9	▼0.4
Rejected ballots		47	1.1	▲0.9
Conservative hold		Swing	▲4.3	

=== New Brighton ===
New Brighton
Party	Candidate	Votes	%	±%
Labour	Pat Hackett	2,248	57.0	▼2.1
Conservative	Keith Raybould	682	17.3	▼8.5
Green	Cynthia Stonall	541	13.7	▲5.7
Liberal Democrats	Charlie Smethurst	256	6.5	▲2.0
UKIP	Paula Walters	218	5.5	▲2.9
Majority		1,566	39.7	▲6.4
Registered electors		11,214		
Turnout		3,959	35.3	▼0.9
Rejected ballots		14	0.4	▲0.2
Labour hold		Swing	▲3.2	

=== Oxton ===
Oxton
Party	Candidate	Votes	%	±%
Liberal Democrats	Andy Corkhill	2,627	59.8	▲12.2
Labour	Jeff Davies	1,298	29.6	▼9.4
UKIP	Chris Bunker	245	5.6	New
Conservative	Tina McDonnell	220	5.0	▼3.6
Majority		1,329	30.3	▲21.7
Registered electors		10,950		
Turnout		4,405	40.2	▲1.1
Rejected ballots		15	0.3	▲0.2
Liberal Democrats gain from Independent		Swing	▲10.8	

=== Pensby and Thingwall ===
Pensby and Thingwall
Party	Candidate	Votes	%	±%
Conservative	Mike Collins	2,201	44.8	▲1.4
Labour	Phil Brightmore	1,705	34.7	▼9.2
Green	Allen Burton	700	14.2	▲8.5
Liberal Democrats	Colin Thompson	307	6.2	▼0.8
Majority		496	10.1	N/A
Registered electors		10,390		
Turnout		4,950	47.6	▲6.7
Rejected ballots		37	0.7	▲0.5
Conservative gain from Labour		Swing	▲5.3	

=== Prenton ===
Prenton
Party	Candidate	Votes	%	±%
Green	Chris Cooke	2,915	63.6	▲29.5
Labour	Angie Davies	1,467	32.0	▼17.4
Conservative	Hilary Jones	200	4.4	▼7.7
Majority		1,448	31.6	N/A
Registered electors		10,995		
Turnout		4,614	42.0	▲6.4
Rejected ballots		32	0.7	▲0.4
Green gain from Labour		Swing	▲23.5	

=== Rock Ferry ===
Rock Ferry
Party	Candidate	Votes	%	±%
Labour	Yvonne Nolan	1,280	45.0	▼29.9
Independent	Chris Meaden	1,095	38.5	New
Green	Moira Gommon	312	11.0	▲4.4
Conservative	Johnathan Andrew	160	5.6	▼5.5
Majority		185	6.5	▼57.3
Registered electors		10,043		
Turnout		2,861	28.5	▲4.7
Rejected ballots		14	0.5	▲0.3
Labour gain from Independent		Swing	▼28.7	

=== Seacombe ===
Seacombe
Party	Candidate	Votes	%	±%
Labour	Christine Jones	1,582	63.9	▼13.2
UKIP	Chris Wellstead	375	15.1	New
Green	Diane Johnson	286	11.5	▲4.8
Conservative	John Laing	234	9.4	▼3.6
Majority		1,207	48.7	▼15.4
Registered electors		10,143		
Turnout		2,494	24.6	▼0.5
Rejected ballots		17	0.7	▲0.5
Labour hold		Swing	▼7.7	

=== Upton ===
Upton
Party	Candidate	Votes	%	±%
Labour	Tony Smith	1,775	49.4	▼8.8
Conservative	Emma Sellman	937	26.1	▼2.5
Green	Lily Clough	636	17.7	▲11.0
Liberal Democrats	Alan Davies	243	6.8	▲2.6
Majority		838	23.3	▼6.3
Registered electors		12,234		
Turnout		3,631	29.7	▼1.9
Rejected ballots		40	1.1	▲0.8
Labour hold		Swing	▼3.2	

=== Wallasey ===
Wallasey
Party	Candidate	Votes	%	±%
Conservative	Paul Hayes	2,795	52.6	▼2.0
Labour	Paul Martin	1,705	32.1	▼6.6
Green	James Brady	340	6.4	▲3.0
Liberal Democrats	John Codling	243	4.6	▲1.3
UKIP	Kriss Cringle	235	4.4	New
Majority		1,090	20.5	▲4.5
Registered electors		11,795		
Turnout		5,334	45.2	▲0.9
Rejected ballots		16	0.3	▲0.2
Conservative hold		Swing	▲2.3	

=== West Kirby and Thurstaston ===
West Kirby and Thurstaston
Party	Candidate	Votes	%	±%
Conservative	Jenny Johnson	2,536	55.1	▼6.4
Labour	James Laing	959	20.8	▼4.4
Green	Yvonne McGinley	726	15.8	▲8.7
Liberal Democrats	Michael Redfern	383	8.3	▲2.1
Majority		1,577	34.3	▼2.0
Registered electors		10,200		
Turnout		4,638	45.5	▲0.6
Rejected ballots		34	0.7	▲0.5
Conservative hold		Swing	▼1.0	

== Changes between 2019 and 2021 ==
Date	Ward	Name	Previous affiliation	New affiliation	Circumstance
17 July 2019	Greasby, Frankby and Irby	David Burgess-Joyce	Conservative	Independent	Suspended.
6 February 2020	Bromborough	Jo Bird	Labour Co-op	Independent	Suspended.
14 February 2020	Bromborough	Jo Bird	Independent	Labour Co-op	Reinstated.
9 August 2020	Birkenhead and Tranmere	Steve Hayes	Green	Independent	Resigned.
After 20 July 2020	Greasby, Frankby and Irby	David Burgess-Joyce	Independent	Conservative	Reinstated.
14 November 2020	Hoylake and Meols	Tony Cox	Conservative	Independent	Suspended.
December 2020	Prenton	Tony Norbury	Labour	Independent	Suspended.
February 2021	Prenton	Tony Norbury	Independent	Labour	Reinstated.
After November 2020	Hoylake and Meols	Tony Cox	Independent	Conservative	Reinstated.

== Notes ==
• italics denote the sitting councillor • bold denotes the winning candidate
