= Pensby and Thingwall (ward) =

Electoral ward of Wirral, Merseyside, UK

Pensby and Thingwall within Wirral

Pensby and Thingwall is a Wirral Metropolitan Borough Council Ward in the Wirral West Parliamentary constituency.

== Councillors ==
Election	Councillor (Party)	Councillor (Party)	Councillor (Party)	Ref.
2004	Oliver Adam (Liberal Democrats /Conservative)	Jacquie McKelvie (Conservative)	Ian Mackenzie (Conservative)	
2006	Mike Redfern (Liberal Democrats)	Jacquie McKelvie (Conservative)	Ian Mackenzie (Conservative)	
2007	Mike Redfern (Liberal Democrats)	Sarah Quinn (Liberal Democrats)	Ian Mackenzie (Conservative)	
2008	Mike Redfern (Liberal Democrats)	Sarah Quinn (Liberal Democrats)	Bob Wilkins (Liberal Democrats)	
2010	Mark Johnston (Liberal Democrats /Independent)	Don McCubbin (Conservative)	Bob Wilkins (Liberal Democrats)	
2011	Mark Johnston (Liberal Democrats /Independent)	Don McCubbin (Conservative)	Bob Wilkins (Liberal Democrats)	
2012	Mark Johnston (Liberal Democrats /Independent)	Don McCubbin (Conservative)	Mike Sullivan (Labour /Independent)	
2013 by-election	Mark Johnston (Liberal Democrats /Independent)	Phil Brightmore (Labour)	Mike Sullivan (Labour /Independent)	
2014	Louise Reecejones (Labour)	Phil Brightmore (Labour)	Mike Sullivan (Labour /Independent)	
2015	Louise Reecejones (Labour)	Phil Brightmore (Labour)	Mike Sullivan (Labour /Independent)	
2016	Louise Reecejones (Labour)	Phil Brightmore (Labour)	Mike Sullivan (Labour /Independent)	
2018	Kate Cannon (Labour)	Phil Brightmore (Labour)	Mike Sullivan (Labour /Independent)	
2019	Kate Cannon (Labour)	Mike Collins (Conservative)	Mike Sullivan (Labour /Independent)	
2021	Kate Cannon (Labour)	Mike Collins (Conservative)	Ivan Camphor (Conservative)	
2022	Leah Fraser (Conservative)	Mike Collins (Conservative)	Ivan Camphor (Conservative)	

== Election results ==
=== Elections of the 2020s ===
Wirral Metropolitan Borough Council election, 6 May 2021: Pensby and Thingwall
Party	Candidate	Votes	%	±%
Conservative	Ivan Camphor	2,234	48.4	▲3.6
Labour	Tim Watson	1,676	36.3	▲1.6
Green	Allen Burton	453	9.8	▼4.4
Liberal Democrats	Phil Waterfield	257	5.6	▼0.6
Majority		558	12.1	▲2.0
Registered electors		10,492		
Turnout		4,665	44.5	▼3.1
Rejected ballots		45	1.0	▲0.3
Conservative gain from Independent		Swing	▲1.0	

=== Elections of the 2010s ===
==== May 2019 ====
Wirral Metropolitan Borough Council election, 2 May 2019: Pensby and Thingwall
Party	Candidate	Votes	%	±%
Conservative	Mike Collins	2,201	44.8	▲1.4
Labour	Phil Brightmore	1,705	34.7	▼9.2
Green	Allen Burton	700	14.2	▲8.5
Liberal Democrats	Colin Thompson	307	6.2	▼0.8
Majority		496	10.1	N/A
Registered electors		10,390		
Turnout		4,950	47.6	▲6.7
Rejected ballots		37	0.7	▲0.5
Conservative gain from Labour		Swing	▲5.3	

==== May 2018 ====
Wirral Metropolitan Borough Council election, 3 May 2018: Pensby and Thingwall
Party	Candidate	Votes	%	±%
Labour	Kate Cannon	1,878	43.9	▼4.6
Conservative	Michael Collins	1,855	43.4	▲10.1
Liberal Democrats	Lucy Johnson	298	7.0	▲0.6
Green	Allen Burton	244	5.7	▲3.0
Majority		23	0.5	▼14.7
Registered electors		10,473		
Turnout		4,282	40.9	▼3.9
Rejected ballots		7	0.2	▼0.4
Labour hold		Swing	▼7.4	

==== May 2016 ====
Wirral Metropolitan Borough Council election, 5 May 2016: Pensby and Thingwall
Party	Candidate	Votes	%	±%
Labour	Mike Sullivan	2,243	48.5	▲9.4
Conservative	Andrew Gardner (Note: Councillor for Hoylake and Meols, 2018 to present.)	1,541	33.3	▼3.6
UKIP	Jan Davison	417	9.0	▼1.1
Liberal Democrats	Damien Cummins	296	6.4	▼1.2
Green	Allen Burton	125	2.7	▼2.1
Majority		702	15.2	▲13.0
Registered electors		10,388		
Turnout		4,651	44.8	▼30.4
Rejected ballots		29	0.6	
Labour hold		Swing	▲6.5	

==== May 2015 ====
Wirral Metropolitan Borough Council election, 7 May 2015: Pensby and Thingwall
Party	Candidate	Votes	%	±%
Labour	Phillip Brightmore	3,085	39.1	▲6.5
Conservative	Ian MacKenzie	2,918	36.9	▲8.2
UKIP	Hilary Jones	796	10.1	▼12.3
Liberal Democrats	Damien Cummins	602	7.6	▼1.9
Green	Allen Burton	378	4.8	▼1.9
Independent	Maureen Wilkinson	69	0.9	New
TUSC	Phil Simpson	50	0.6	New
Majority		167	2.2	▼1.7
Registered electors		10,589		
Turnout			75.2	▲36.2
Labour hold		Swing	▼0.9	

==== May 2014 ====
Wirral Metropolitan Borough Council election, 22 May 2014: Pensby and Thingwall
Party	Candidate	Votes	%	±%
Labour	Louise Reecejones	1,334	32.6	▼0.2
Conservative	Denis Knowles (Note: Councillor for Seacombe, 1996 to 2011.)	1,172	28.7	▲0.3
UKIP	Jan Davison	916	22.4	▲13.2
Liberal Democrats	Damien Cummins	390	9.5	▼15.7
Green	Allen Burton	274	6.7	▲2.3
Majority		162	4.0	▼0.4
Registered electors		10,520		
Turnout			39.0	▼2.1
Labour gain from Independent		Swing	▼0.2	

==== February 2013 ====
By-election, 28 February 2013: Pensby and Thingwall
Party	Candidate	Votes	%	±%
Labour	Phillip Brightmore	1,411	38.5	▲5.7
Conservative	Sheila Clarke (Note: Councillor for Bebington, 2004 to 2013.)	868	23.7	▼4.7
Liberal Democrats	Damien Cummins	834	22.7	▼2.5
UKIP	Jan Davison	426	11.6	▲2.4
Green	Allen Burton	74	2.0	▼2.4
English Democrat	Neil Kenny	53	1.4	New
Majority		543	14.8	▲10.4
Registered electors		10,487		
Turnout			35.0	▼6.1
Labour gain from Conservative		Swing	▲5.2	

==== May 2012 ====
Wirral Metropolitan Borough Council election, 3 May 2012: Pensby and Thingwall
Party	Candidate	Votes	%	±%
Labour	Michael Sullivan	1,406	32.8	▲0.7
Conservative	Tom Anderson (Note: Councillor for Upton, 2008 to 2012. Councillor for Greasby, Frankby and Irby, 2014 to present.)	1,217	28.4	▼8.5
Liberal Democrats	Damien Cummins	1,079	25.2	▲1.5
UKIP	Janet Davison	394	9.2	▲5.4
Green	Allen Burton	190	4.4	▲0.9
Majority		189	4.4	N/A
Registered electors		10,462		
Turnout			41.1	▼7.7
Labour gain from Liberal Democrats		Swing	▲4.6	

==== May 2011 ====
Wirral Metropolitan Borough Council election, 5 May 2011: Pensby and Thingwall
Party	Candidate	Votes	%	±%
Conservative	Don McCubbin	1,881	36.9	▲5.8
Labour	Michael Sullivan	1,636	32.1	▲11.1
Liberal Democrats	Damien Cummins	1,209	23.7	▼12.1
UKIP	Oliver Sayle-Adam	196	3.8	▼2.7
Green	Allen Burton	180	3.5	▼2.1
Majority		245	4.8	N/A
Registered electors		10,493		
Turnout			48.8	▼22.7
Conservative hold		Swing	▲4.8	

==== May 2010 ====
Wirral Metropolitan Borough Council election, 6 May 2010: Pensby and Thingwall
Party	Candidate	Votes	%	±%
Liberal Democrats	Mark Johnston (Note: Elected to serve a 4-year term.)	2,854	35.8	▼7.9
Conservative	Don McCubbin (Note: Elected to serve a 1-year term.)	2,479	31.1	▼7.1
Liberal Democrats	Michael Redfern	2,297	–	–
Conservative	Adam Sykes (Note: Councillor for Clatterbridge, 2011 to present.)	2,103	–	–
Labour	Michael Sullivan	1,673	21.0	▲9.1
Labour	Sylvia Hodrien (Note: Councillor for Upton, 2012 to 2013.)	1,517	–	–
UKIP	Janet Davison	518	6.5	▲3.1
Green	Allen Burton	448	5.6	▲2.8
Majority		375	4.7	▼0.8
Registered electors		10,666		
Turnout			71.5	▲26.9
Liberal Democrats hold		Swing	▼0.4	
Conservative gain from Liberal Democrats		Swing	–	

=== Elections of the 2000s ===
==== May 2008 ====
Wirral Metropolitan Borough Council election, 1 May 2008: Pensby and Thingwall
Party	Candidate	Votes	%	±%
Liberal Democrats	Robert Wilkins	2,071	43.7	▼0.3
Conservative	John Meyer	1,813	38.2	▲1.2
Labour	John Cunningham	564	11.9	▼3.6
UKIP	Mike Pepler	160	3.4	New
Green	Allen Burton	135	2.8	▼0.7
Majority		258	5.5	▼1.5
Registered electors		10,656		
Turnout			44.6	▼0.2
Liberal Democrats gain from Conservative		Swing	▼0.8	

==== May 2007 ====
Wirral Metropolitan Borough Council election, 3 May 2007: Pensby and Thingwall
Party	Candidate	Votes	%	±%
Liberal Democrats	Sarah Quinn	2,110	44.0	▲3.6
Conservative	Jacquie McKelvie	1,777	37.0	▼0.5
Labour	John Cunningham	742	15.5	▼1.0
Green	Allen Burton	170	3.5	▼2.1
Majority		333	7.0	▲4.1
Registered electors		10,743		
Turnout			44.8	▲2.2
Liberal Democrats gain from Conservative		Swing	▲2.1	

==== May 2006 ====
Wirral Metropolitan Borough Council election, 4 May 2006: Pensby and Thingwall
Party	Candidate	Votes	%	±%
Liberal Democrats	Michael Redfern	1,843	40.4	▲7.9
Conservative	Oliver Adam	1,710	37.5	▲2.5
Labour	John Cunningham	754	16.5	▼6.0
Green	Allen Burton	256	5.6	▼4.5
Majority		133	2.9	N/A
Registered electors		10,745		
Turnout			42.6	▼7.5
Liberal Democrats gain from Conservative		Swing	▲2.7	

==== June 2004 ====
Wirral Metropolitan Borough Council election, 10 June 2004: Pensby and Thingwall
Party	Candidate	Votes	%	±%
Conservative	Ian Mackenzie	2,037	35.0	N/A
Conservative	Jacqueline McKelvie (Note: Elected to serve a 3-year term.)	2,033	–	–
Liberal Democrats	Oliver Adam (Note: Elected to serve a 2-year term.)	1,894	32.5	N/A
Conservative	Ian McKellar	1,810	–	–
Liberal Democrats	Susan Welshman	1,427	–	–
Liberal Democrats	Christopher Jackson	1,329	–	–
Labour	John Cunningham	1,311	22.5	N/A
Labour	Francis McIver	1,265	–	–
Labour	David Kean	1,022	–	–
Green	Allen Burton	586	10.1	N/A
Majority		143	2.5	N/A
Registered electors		10,813		
Turnout			50.1	N/A
Conservative win (new seat)				
Conservative win (new seat)				
Liberal Democrats win (new seat)				

== Notes ==
• italics denotes the sitting councillor • bold denotes the winning candidate
