= 2008 Wirral Metropolitan Borough Council election =

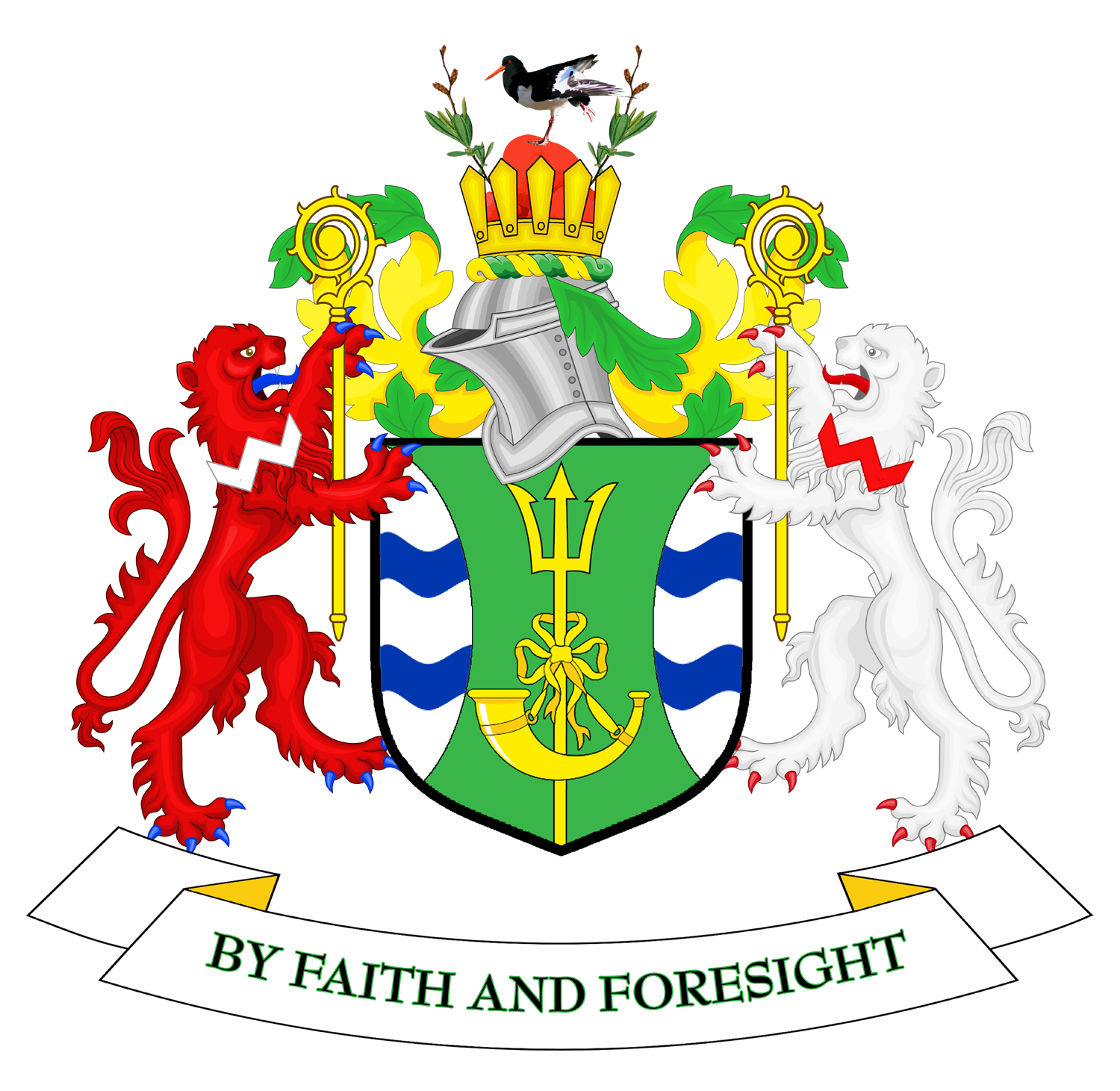
- 1 May 2008

22 of 66 seats (one third) to Wirral Metropolitan Borough Council 34 seats needed for a majority
- Turnout: 36.0% (▼0.1%)
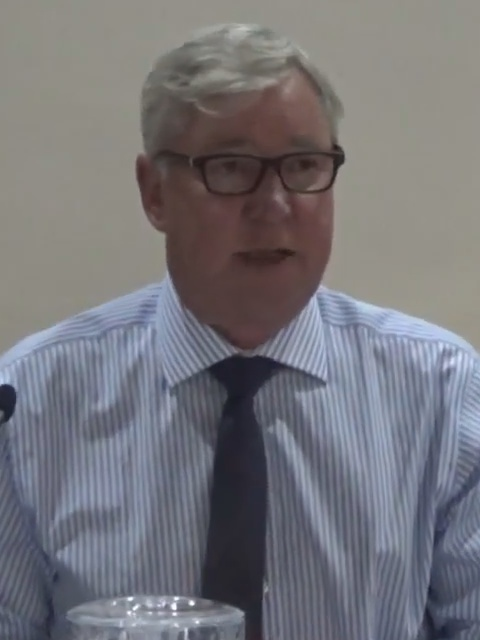

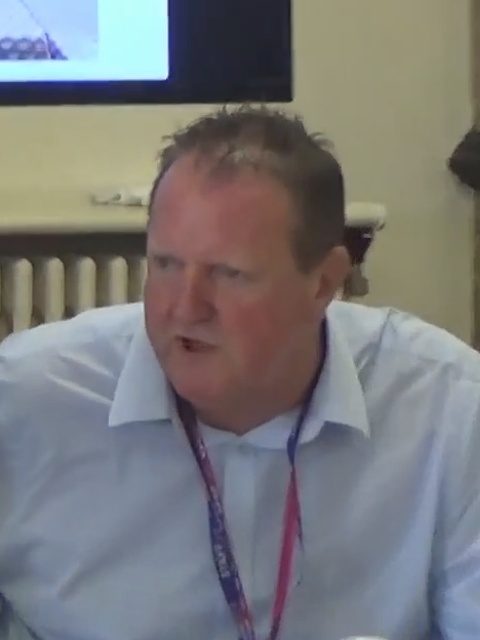

	First party	Second party	Third party
Leader	Jeff Green	Steve Foulkes	Simon Holbrook
Party	Conservative	Labour	Liberal Democrats
Leader's seat	West Kirby and Thurstaston	Claughton	Prenton
Last election	7 seats, 38.6%	8 seats, 28.7%	7 seats, 25.2%
Seats before	20	25	19
Seats won	11	5	6
Seats after	24	21	20
Seat change	▲4	▼4	▲1
Popular vote	37,925	22,277	19,624
Percentage	43.6%	25.6%	22.6%
Swing	▲5.0%	▼3.1%	▼2.6%
- Map of results of 2008 election
Leader of the Council before election
Steve Foulkes (Labour)
No Overall Control
Leader of the Council after election
Steve Foulkes (Labour)
No Overall Control

The 2008 Wirral Metropolitan Borough Council election took place on 1 May 2008 to elect members to the Wirral Metropolitan Borough Council. This election was held on the same day as other local elections.

After the election, the composition of the council was:

Party	Seats	±
Conservative	24	▲4
Labour	21	▼4
Liberal Democrat	20	▲1
Ind. Conservative	1	Steady
Ind. Lib Dem	0	▼1

== Election results ==
=== Overall election result ===
Overall result compared with 2007.

Wirral Metropolitan Borough Council election result, 2008
Party	Candidates						Votes		
Party	Stood	Elected	Gained	Unseated	Net	% of total	%	No.	Net %
Conservative	22	11	5	1	▲4	50.0	43.6	37,925	▲5.0
Labour	22	5	0	4	▼4	22.7	25.6	22,277	▼3.1
Liberal Democrats	22	6	1	0	▲1	27.3	22.6	19,624	▼2.6
Green	22	0	0	0	Steady	0.0	4.9	4,267	▼0.5
UKIP	11	0	0	0	Steady	0.0	2.4	2,127	▲0.7
BNP	2	0	0	0	Steady	0.0	0.6	489	N/A
Independent	1	0	0	0	Steady	0.0	0.2	147	▼0.2
Liberal	1	0	0	0	Steady	0.0	0.1	96	N/A
Ind. Lib Dem	0	0	0	1	▼1	0.0	0.0	0	N/A

== Ward results ==
Results compared directly with the last local election in 2007.
Note: Italics denote the sitting councillor, bold denotes the winning candidate (and party).

=== Bebington ===
Bebington
Party	Candidate	Votes	%	±%
**Conservative**	**Sheila Clarke**	**1,945**	**40.9**	**▲10.0**
Labour	Susan Percy	1,719	36.2	▼7.5
UKIP	Hilary Jones	479	10.1	▼0.1
Liberal Democrats	Sheena Turner	448	9.4	▼2.1
Green	Michael Harper	162	3.4	▼0.3
Majority		226	4.7	N/A
Registered electors		11,858		
Turnout			40.1	▼1.8
Conservative **hold**		Swing	▲8.8	

=== Bidston and St James ===
Bidston and St James
Party	Candidate	Votes	%	±%
**Labour**	**James Crabtree**	**1,129**	**54.6**	**▼5.1**
Conservative	Christine Wilson	313	15.1	▲2.5
Liberal Democrats	John Brace	266	12.9	▲3.6
BNP	Steve McHale	236	11.4	N/A
Green	George Bowler	125	6.0	▲1.0
Majority		816	39.5	▼6.8
Registered electors		10,030		
Turnout			20.7	▼1.7
Labour **hold**		Swing	▼3.4	

=== Birkenhead and Tranmere ===
Birkenhead and Tranmere
Party	Candidate	Votes	%	±%
**Labour**	**Jean Stapleton**	**1,278**	**59.9**	**▼2.5**
Liberal Democrats	Alan Brighouse	315	14.8	▼0.1
Conservative	June Cowin	297	13.9	▲2.5
Green	Catherine Page	244	11.4	▲0.1
Majority		963	45.1	▼2.4
Registered electors		10,278		
Turnout			20.8	▼0.9
Labour **hold**		Swing	▼1.2	

=== Bromborough ===
Bromborough
Party	Candidate	Votes	%	±%
**Liberal Democrats**	**Steve Niblock**	**1,496**	**42.8**	**▼5.5**
Labour	Irene Williams	817	23.4	▼4.2
Conservative	Mark Gibson	746	21.3	▲2.5
BNP	David McLennan	253	7.2	New
Green	Percy Hogg	132	3.8	▼1.5
UKIP	Timothy Pass	53	1.5	New
Majority		679	19.4	▼1.2
Registered electors		10,736		
Turnout			32.6	▼0.7
Liberal Democrats **hold**		Swing	▼0.6	

=== Clatterbridge ===
Clatterbridge
Party	Candidate	Votes	%	±%
**Conservative**	**Cherry Povall**	**2,950**	**55.2**	**▲15.1**
Liberal Democrats	Robert Earl	1,566	29.3	▼15.4
Labour	Valerie Morgan	591	11.0	▼1.0
Green	Jim McGinley	130	2.4	▼0.8
UKIP	Roger Jones	112	2.1	New
Majority		1,384	25.9	N/A
Registered electors		11,811		
Turnout			45.4	Steady
Conservative **gain** from Ind. Lib Dem		Swing	▲15.3	

=== Claughton ===
Claughton
Party	Candidate	Votes	%	±%
**Labour**	**George Davies**	**1,695**	**51.1**	**▼0.9**
Conservative	Barbara Sinclair	959	28.9	▲1.4
Liberal Democrats	Roy Wood	482	14.5	▲0.4
Green	James Brady	179	5.4	▼1.0
Majority		736	22.2	▼2.3
Registered electors		11,330		
Turnout			29.4	▼0.4
Labour **hold**		Swing	▼1.2	

=== Eastham ===
Eastham
Party	Candidate	Votes	%	±%
**Liberal Democrats**	**Phillip Gilchrist**	**3,038**	**71.3**	**▲1.0**
Conservative	Nick Whieldon	678	15.9	▲0.7
Labour	Christopher Lawler	415	9.7	▼2.2
Green	Brian Gibbs	132	3.1	▲0.5
Majority		2,360	55.4	▲0.3
Registered electors		11,121		
Turnout			38.3	▼0.8
Liberal Democrats **hold**		Swing	▲0.1	

=== Greasby, Frankby and Irby ===
Greasby, Frankby and Irby
Party	Candidate	Votes	%	±%
**Liberal Democrats**	**Gill Gardiner**	**2,329**	**44.6**	**▼2.7**
Conservative	Wendy Clements	2,254	43.2	▲9.0
Labour	Barbara Moores	493	9.4	▼0.9
Green	Perle Sheldricks	145	2.8	▲0.4
Majority		75	1.4	▼11.7
Registered electors		11,539		
Turnout			45.3	▼0.9
Liberal Democrats **hold**		Swing	▼5.9	

=== Heswall ===
Heswall
Party	Candidate	Votes	%	±%
**Conservative**	**Peter Johnson**	**3,599**	**73.7**	**▲4.4**
Liberal Democrats	Bill Jones	513	10.5	▼2.2
Labour	Audrey Moore	453	9.3	▼2.8
Green	Matthew Rosseinsky	219	4.5	▼1.5
UKIP	Mike Magee	101	2.1	New
Majority		3,086	63.2	▲6.6
Registered electors		11,095		
Turnout			44.3	▲0.3
Conservative **hold**		Swing	▲3.3	

=== Hoylake and Meols ===
Hoylake and Meols
Party	Candidate	Votes	%	±%
**Conservative**	**John Hale**	**2,762**	**64.8**	**▼1.9**
Labour	Di Christian	676	15.9	▲0.8
Green	Colin Hawksworth	468	11.0	▲3.1
Liberal Democrats	Alexander Clark	355	8.3	▼2.0
Majority		2,086	48.9	▼2.7
Registered electors		10,474		
Turnout			40.8	▼0.9
Conservative **hold**		Swing	▼1.4	

=== Leasowe and Moreton East ===
Leasowe and Moreton East
Party	Candidate	Votes	%	±%
**Conservative**	**Ian Lewis**	**2,025**	**51.4**	**▲7.5**
Labour	Don Prout	1,373	34.9	▼9.4
Liberal Democrats	Gerald Hainsworth	222	5.6	▼0.8
Green	Rosemary Bland	171	4.3	▼1.1
Independent	Glenn Fleetwood	147	3.7	New
Majority		652	16.5	N/A
Registered electors		10,905		
Turnout			36.2	▲1.9
Conservative **gain** from Labour		Swing	▲8.5	

=== Liscard ===
Liscard
Party	Candidate	Votes	%	±%
**Conservative**	**James Keeley**	**2,122**	**51.1**	**▲1.4**
Labour	David Hawkins	1,369	33.0	▼4.8
UKIP	Robbie Quinn	304	7.3	▲3.8
Liberal Democrats	Daniel Clein	195	4.7	▼1.0
Green	Jacqueline Smith	159	3.8	▲0.4
Majority		753	18.1	▲6.2
Registered electors		11,208		
Turnout			37.1	▼0.3
Conservative **gain** from Labour		Swing	▲3.1	

=== Moreton West and Saughall Massie ===
Moreton West and Saughall Massie
Party	Candidate	Votes	%	±%
**Conservative**	**Christopher Blakeley**	**2,936**	**71.1**	**▲10.6**
Labour	Darren Dodd	674	16.3	▼7.8
Liberal Democrats	Eric Copestake	237	5.7	▼2.1
UKIP	Lynda Williams	145	3.5	Steady
Green	James Drew	137	3.3	▼0.8
Majority		2,262	54.8	▲18.4
Registered electors		10,920		
Turnout			37.9	▲2.6
Conservative **hold**		Swing	▲9.2	

=== New Brighton ===
New Brighton
Party	Candidate	Votes	%	±%
**Conservative**	**Sue Taylor**	**1,994**	**47.5**	**▲1.8**
Labour	Pat Hackett	1,572	37.4	▲5.8
Green	Rebecca Koncienzcy	358	8.5	▼4.9
Liberal Democrats	Eric Fenna	278	6.6	▼2.7
Majority		422	10.1	▼4.0
Registered electors		10,930		
Turnout			38.6	▲2.9
Conservative **gain** from Labour		Swing	▼2.0	

=== Oxton ===
Oxton
Party	Candidate	Votes	%	±%
**Liberal Democrats**	**Pat Williams**	**1,910**	**53.2**	**▼1.6**
Conservative	Marcus Bleasdale	748	20.8	▲4.1
Labour	David Barden	614	17.1	▼1.8
UKIP	Cathy Williams	179	5.0	▲0.7
Green	Garnette Bowler	139	3.9	▼1.4
Majority		1,162	32.4	▼3.5
Registered electors		11,141		
Turnout			32.4	▼0.2
Liberal Democrats **hold**		Swing	▼1.8	

=== Pensby and Thingwall ===
Pensby and Thingwall
Party	Candidate	Votes	%	±%
**Liberal Democrats**	**Robert Wilkins**	**2,071**	**43.7**	**▼0.3**
Conservative	John Meyer	1,813	38.2	▲1.2
Labour	John Cunningham	564	11.9	▼3.6
UKIP	Mike Pepler	160	3.4	New
Green	Allen Burton	135	2.8	▼0.7
Majority		258	5.5	▼1.5
Registered electors		10,656		
Turnout			44.6	▼0.2
Liberal Democrats **gain** from Conservative		Swing	▼0.8	

=== Prenton ===
Prenton
Party	Candidate	Votes	%	±%
**Liberal Democrats**	**Ann Bridson**	**1,836**	**48.5**	**▼3.8**
Labour	Denise Realey	905	23.9	▼3.0
Conservative	John Gilbert	792	20.9	▲4.4
Green	Mark Mitchell	154	4.1	▼0.2
Liberal	Sean Keatley	96	2.5	New
Majority		931	24.6	▼0.8
Registered electors		11,017		
Turnout			34.5	▼2.4
Liberal Democrats **hold**		Swing	▼0.4	

=== Rock Ferry ===
Rock Ferry
Party	Candidate	Votes	%	±%
**Labour**	**Bill Davies**	**1,325**	**55.2**	**▼4.4**
Conservative	Joanne Suffield	493	20.5	▲3.0
Liberal Democrats	Peter Heppinstall	354	14.8	▲1.0
Green	Peter Exley	228	9.5	▲0.4
Majority		832	34.7	▼7.4
Registered electors		10,023		
Turnout			24.1	Steady
Labour **hold**		Swing	▼3.7	

=== Seacombe ===
Seacombe
Party	Candidate	Votes	%	±%
**Labour**	**John Salter**	**1,188**	**51.0**	**▼8.5**
Conservative	Ann Lavin	508	21.8	▲0.1
Liberal Democrats	Steve Pitt	282	12.1	▼0.2
UKIP	Christopher Wellstead	243	10.4	New
Green	Simon Wagner	107	4.6	▼2.0
Majority		680	29.2	▼8.6
Registered electors		10,445		
Turnout			22.4	▼0.6
Labour **hold**		Swing	▼4.3	

=== Upton ===
Upton
Party	Candidate	Votes	%	±%
**Conservative**	**Tom Anderson**	**1,861**	**42.1**	**▲3.4**
Labour	Sue Brown	1,857	42.0	▼1.1
Liberal Democrats	Christopher Beazer	451	10.2	▼2.6
Green	Lesley Hussenbux	256	5.8	▲0.4
Majority		4	0.1	N/A
Registered electors		12,277		
Turnout			36.2	▼0.2
Conservative **gain** from Labour		Swing	▲2.3	

=== Wallasey ===
Wallasey
Party	Candidate	Votes	%	±%
**Conservative**	**Kate Wood**	**3,083**	**64.2**	**▲5.9**
Labour	Anne McArdle	954	19.9	▼3.8
Liberal Democrats	John Codling	409	8.5	▼1.2
UKIP	Ian Watson	180	3.7	▼0.7
Green	Cynthia Stonall	175	3.6	▼0.3
Majority		2,129	44.3	▲9.7
Registered electors		11,937		
Turnout			40.2	▲0.1
Conservative **hold**		Swing	▲4.9	

=== West Kirby and Thurstaston ===
West Kirby and Thurstaston
Party	Candidate	Votes	%	±%
**Conservative**	**Geoffrey Watt**	**3,047**	**64.6**	**▲2.6**
Labour	James Brown	616	13.1	▼0.9
Liberal Democrats	John Cresswell	571	12.1	▼3.6
Green	Patrick Cleary	312	6.6	▼1.7
UKIP	Philip Griffiths	171	3.6	New
Majority		2,431	51.5	▲5.2
Registered electors		10,346		
Turnout			45.7	▲1.8
Conservative **hold**		Swing	▲2.6	

== Changes between 2008 and 2010 ==
=== Moreton West and Saughall Massie by-election 2009 ===
By-election, 26 November 2009: Moreton West and Saughall Massie
Party	Candidate	Votes	%	±%
Conservative	Steve Williams	2,255	70.1	▼1.0
Labour	Andrew Hollingworth	615	19.1	▲2.8
Liberal Democrats	Steve Pitt	134	4.2	▼1.5
Independent	Alec McFadden	121	3.8	New
Green	Jim McGinley	92	2.9	▼0.4
Majority		1,640	51.0	▼3.8
Turnout			28.0	▼9.9
Conservative hold		Swing	▼1.9	

=== Other changes ===
Date	Ward	Name	Previous affiliation	New affiliation	Circumstance
18 May 2009	Seacombe	Denis Knowles	Labour	Conservative	Defected.
