= 2015 Wirral Metropolitan Borough Council election =

2015 local election in England

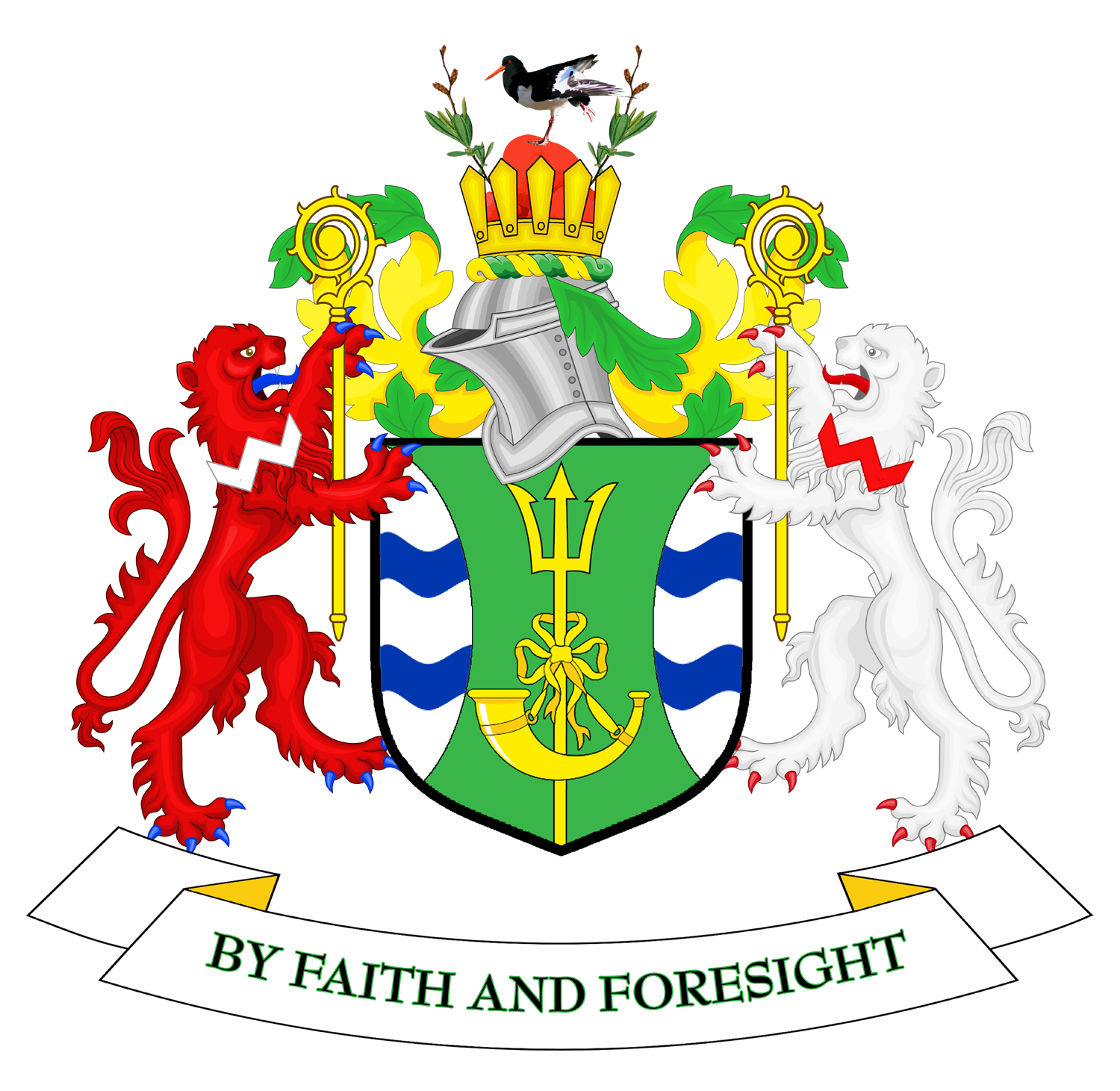
- 7 May 2015

22 of 66 seats (One Third) to Wirral Metropolitan Borough Council 34 seats needed for a majority
- Turnout: 69.1% (▲33.5%)
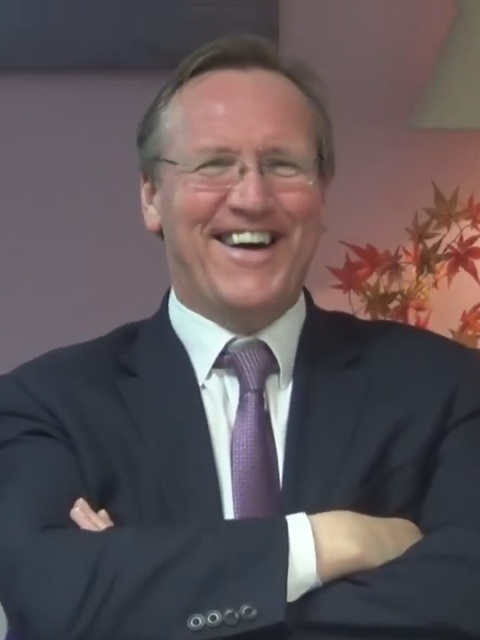

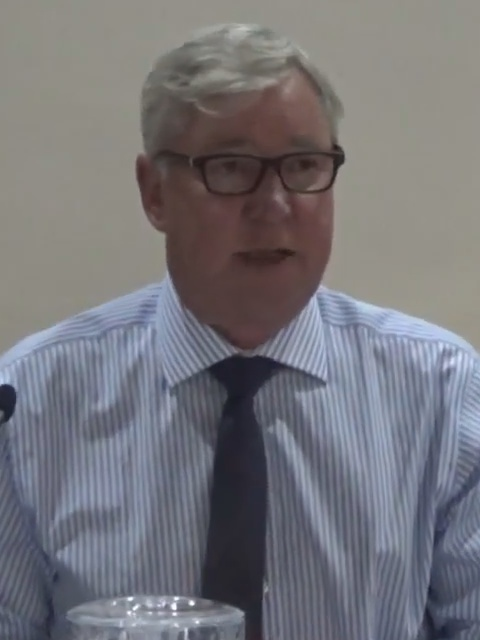

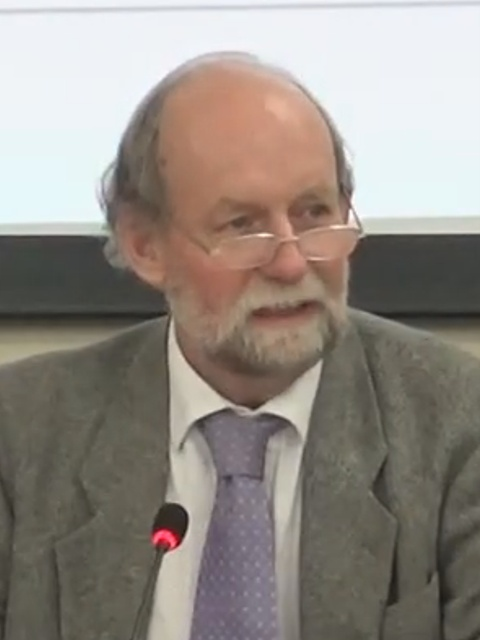

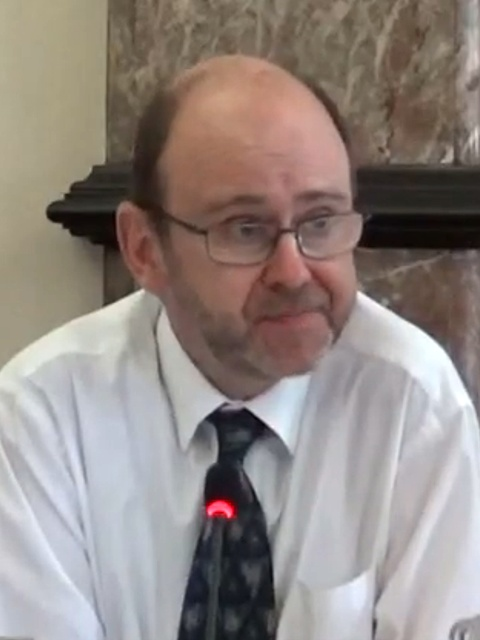
	First party	Second party
Leader	Phil Davies	Jeff Green
Party	Labour	Conservative
Leader's seat	Birkenhead and Tranmere	West Kirby and Thurstaston
Last election	12 seats, 38.6%	8 seats, 28.0%
Seats before	38	21
Seats won	14	7
Seats after	39	21
Seat change	▲1	Steady
Popular vote	79,409	46,611
Percentage	47.9%	28.1%
Swing	▲9.3%	▲0.1%
	Third party	Fourth party
Leader	Phil Gilchrist	Pat Cleary
Party	Liberal Democrats	Green
Leader's seat	Eastham	Birkenhead and Tranmere
Last election	2 seats, 7.8%	1 seat, 8.0%
Seats before	6	1
Seats won	1	0
Seats after	5	1
Seat change	▼1	Steady
Popular vote	13,572	10,446
Percentage	8.2%	6.3%
Swing	▲0.4%	▼1.7%
- Map of results of 2015 election
Leader of the Council before election
Phil Davies
Labour
Leader of the Council after election
Phil Davies
Labour

The 2015 Wirral Metropolitan Borough Council election took place on 7 May 2015 to elect members of Wirral Metropolitan Borough Council in England. This election was held on the same day as other local elections.

After the election, the composition of the council was:

Party	Seats	±
Labour	39	▲1
Conservative	21	Steady
Liberal Democrat	5	▼1
Green	1	Steady

== Election results ==
=== Overall election result ===
Overall result compared with 2014.

Wirral Metropolitan Borough Council election result, 2015
Party	Candidates						Votes		
Party	Stood	Elected	Gained	Unseated	Net	% of total	%	No.	Net %
Labour	22	14	1	0	▲1	63.6	47.9	79,409	▲9.3
Conservative	21	7	0	0	Steady	31.8	28.1	46,611	▲0.1
UKIP	20	0	0	0	Steady	0.0	9.0	14,919	▼8.2
Liberal Democrats	18	1	0	1	▼1	4.5	8.2	13,572	▲0.4
Green	22	0	0	0	Steady	0.0	6.3	10,446	▼1.7
TUSC	6	0	0	0	Steady	0.0	0.4	632	▲0.3
Independent	3	0	0	0	Steady	0.0	0.1	195	▼0.2

=== Changes in council composition ===
Prior to the election the composition of the council was:

↓
38	21	6	1
Lab	Con	LD	G

After the election the composition of the council was:

↓
39	21	5	1
Lab	Con	LD	G

Wirral Metropolitan Borough Council composition after the 2015 election

== Ward results ==
=== Bebington ===
Bebington
Party	Candidate	Votes	%	±%
Labour	Jerry Williams	5,107	57.7	▲9.0
Conservative	Des Drury	2,106	23.8	▲1.0
UKIP	Jim Bradshaw	931	10.5	▼9.1
Green	Anthony Smith	452	5.1	▼1.4
Liberal Democrats	Brian Gill	261	2.9	▲0.4
Majority		3,001	33.9	▲8.0
Registered electors		12,107		
Turnout			73.7	▲36.4
Labour hold		Swing	▲4.0	

=== Bidston and St James ===
Bidston and St James
Party	Candidate	Votes	%	±%
Labour	Brian Kenny	4,255	76.9	▲12.3
Conservative	Geoffrey Dormand	590	10.7	▲3.5
Green	Karl Cumings	316	5.7	▲1.7
TUSC	Ben Halligan	199	3.6	▲2.0
Liberal Democrats	Roy Wood	175	3.2	▲1.2
Majority		3,665	66.2	▲22.1
Registered electors		10,049		
Turnout			56.0	▲29.4
Labour hold		Swing	▲11.1	

=== Birkenhead and Tranmere ===
Birkenhead and Tranmere
Party	Candidate	Votes	%	±%
Labour	Phillip Davies	3,130	56.0	▲15.2
Green	Jayne Clough	1,763	31.6	▼16.1
UKIP	Laurence Sharpe-Stevens	447	8.0	▼1.6
Conservative	June Cowin	183	3.3	▲1.3
Liberal Democrats	Mary Price	61	1.1	New
Majority		1,367	24.5	N/A
Registered electors		9,854		
Turnout			56.9	▲21.5
Labour hold		Swing	▲15.6	

=== Bromborough ===
Bromborough
Party	Candidate	Votes	%	±%
Labour	Joe Walsh	4,478	59.3	▲9.4
Conservative	Mike Collins	1,396	18.5	▲4.8
UKIP	Sue Colquhoun	865	11.5	▼11.1
Liberal Democrats	Penelope Golby	367	4.9	▼2.3
Green	Percy Hogg	330	4.4	▼2.2
TUSC	Mark Halligan	118	1.6	New
Majority		3,082	40.8	▲13.5
Registered electors		11,464		
Turnout			66.3	▲35.9
Labour hold		Swing	▲6.8	

=== Clatterbridge ===
Clatterbridge
Party	Candidate	Votes	%	±%
Conservative	Adam Sykes	3,656	41.3	▲0.7
Labour	Jenny Holliday	3,371	38.1	▲6.5
UKIP	Roger Jones	864	9.8	▼7.2
Liberal Democrats	Jan Cambridge	644	7.3	▲1.7
Green	Vinny Spencer	323	3.6	▼1.5
Majority		285	3.2	▼5.8
Registered electors		11,689		
Turnout			76.2	▲35.7
Conservative hold		Swing	▼2.9	

=== Claughton ===
Claughton
Party	Candidate	Votes	%	±%
Labour	Stephen Foulkes	4,101	56.8	▲3.5
Conservative	Barbara Sinclair	1,309	18.1	▲3.6
UKIP	Philip Griffiths	810	11.2	▼10.0
Liberal Democrats	Christopher Teggin	512	7.1	▲2.3
Green	Tom Cubbin	488	6.8	▲0.6
Majority		2,792	38.7	▲6.6
Registered electors		11,266		
Turnout			64.5	▲32.3
Labour hold		Swing	▲3.3	

=== Eastham ===
Eastham
Party	Candidate	Votes	%	±%
Liberal Democrats	Dave Mitchell	3,589	45.1	▲5.6
Labour	Helen Robinson	2,772	34.8	▲4.9
Conservative	Keith Jack	1,314	16.5	▲4.6
Green	Paul Cartlidge	291	3.7	Steady
Majority		817	10.3	▲0.7
Registered electors		11,089		
Turnout			72.5	▲36.1
Liberal Democrats hold		Swing	▲0.4	

=== Greasby, Frankby and Irby ===
Greasby, Frankby and Irby
Party	Candidate	Votes	%	±%
Conservative	David Burgess-Joyce	3,655	40.4	▲1.8
Labour	Julie McManus	2,980	33.0	▲12.1
Liberal Democrats	Peter Reisdorf	1,330	14.7	▼4.3
UKIP	Laurence Jones	723	8.0	▼6.3
Green	Catherine Page	352	3.9	▼3.4
Majority		675	7.4	▼10.3
Registered electors		11,583		
Turnout			78.4	▲35.4
Conservative hold		Swing	▼5.2	

=== Heswall ===
Heswall
Party	Candidate	Votes	%	±%
Conservative	Andrew Hodson	5,035	59.5	▲3.8
Labour	Mike Holliday	1,718	20.3	▲4.8
UKIP	David Scott	715	8.4	▼9.5
Liberal Democrats	David Tyrrell	535	6.3	▲1.9
Green	Barbara Burton	464	5.4	▼0.9
Majority		3,317	39.2	▲1.4
Registered electors		10,874		
Turnout			78.5	▲38.8
Conservative hold		Swing	▲0.7	

=== Hoylake and Meols ===
Hoylake and Meols
Party	Candidate	Votes	%	±%
Conservative	Gerry Ellis	4,125	50.8	▲4.1
Labour	Bill McGenity	2,367	29.1	▲2.9
Green	Yvonne McGinley	758	9.3	▼1.0
UKIP	George Robinson	497	6.1	▼6.9
Liberal Democrats	Michael Redfern	374	4.6	▲0.8
Majority		1,758	21.7	▲1.2
Registered electors		10,610		
Turnout			77.0	▲37.5
Conservative hold		Swing	▲0.6	

=== Leasowe and Moreton East ===
Leasowe and Moreton East
Party	Candidate	Votes	%	±%
Labour	Ron Abbey	4,297	60.8	▲15.3
Conservative	Denis Knowles	1,744	24.7	▼16.1
UKIP	Jan Davison	734	10.4	▼0.4
Green	Craig Reynolds	291	4.1	▲1.2
Majority		2,553	36.1	▲31.4
Registered electors		10,764		
Turnout			65.9	▲28.4
Labour hold		Swing	▲15.7	

=== Liscard ===
Liscard
Party	Candidate	Votes	%	±%
Labour	Bernie Mooney	4,397	62.9	▲16.0
UKIP	Lynda Williams	1,352	19.4	▼4.2
Liberal Democrats	Daniel Clein	578	8.3	▲5.6
Green	Lindsey Stowell-Smith	542	7.8	▼0.1
TUSC	Adam Khan	118	1.7	New
Majority		3,045	43.5	▲20.2
Registered electors		11,091		
Turnout			64.5	▲33.3
Labour hold		Swing	▲10.1	

=== Moreton West and Saughall Massie ===
Moreton West and Saughall Massie
Party	Candidate	Votes	%	±%
Conservative	Steve Williams	3,324	44.3	▲0.4
Labour	Karl Greaney	3,191	42.5	▲6.6
UKIP	Susan Whitham	716	9.5	▼6.9
Green	Perle Sheldricks	272	3.6	▼0.3
Majority		133	1.8	▼6.2
Registered electors		10,860		
Turnout			69.3	▲31.2
Conservative hold		Swing	▼3.1	

=== New Brighton ===
New Brighton
Party	Candidate	Votes	%	±%
Labour	Patrick Hackett	3,822	52.5	▲10.2
Conservative	Tony Pritchard	2,223	30.6	▼3.8
Green	Gillian Homeri	634	8.7	▼2.0
UKIP	Tim Power	595	8.2	▼4.4
Majority		1,599	21.9	▲14.0
Registered electors		11,003		
Turnout			66.4	▲30.1
Labour hold		Swing	▲7.0	

=== Oxton ===
Oxton
Party	Candidate	Votes	%	±%
Labour	Paul Doughty (Note: Incumbent councillor for Prenton ward.)	3,085	39.7	▲4.6
Liberal Democrats	Stuart Kelly	2,788	35.9	▼2.4
Conservative	Hilary Jones	854	11.0	▲3.7
UKIP	David Martin	615	7.9	▼5.4
Green	Liz Heydon	424	5.5	▼0.4
Majority		297	3.8	N/A
Registered electors		11,236		
Turnout			69.4	▲31.9
Labour gain from Liberal Democrats		Swing	▲3.5	

=== Pensby and Thingwall ===
Pensby and Thingwall
Party	Candidate	Votes	%	±%
Labour	Phillip Brightmore	3,085	39.1	▲6.5
Conservative	Ian MacKenzie	2,918	36.9	▲8.2
UKIP	Hilary Jones	796	10.1	▼12.3
Liberal Democrats	Damien Cummins	602	7.6	▼1.9
Green	Allen Burton	378	4.8	▼1.9
Independent	Maureen Wilkinson	69	0.9	New
TUSC	Phil Simpson	50	0.6	New
Majority		167	2.2	▼1.7
Registered electors		10,589		
Turnout			75.2	▲36.2
Labour hold		Swing	▼0.9	

=== Prenton ===
Prenton
Party	Candidate	Votes	%	±%
Labour	Angela Davies	4,362	59.3	▲12.3
Conservative	Robert Hughes	1,307	17.8	▲2.1
UKIP	James Shorthall	864	11.7	▼10.1
Liberal Democrats	Allan Brame	481	6.5	▼1.9
Green	Moira Gommon	342	4.6	▼2.6
Majority		3,055	41.5	▲16.3
Registered electors		10,790		
Turnout			68.4	▲34.2
Labour hold		Swing	▲8.2	

=== Rock Ferry ===
Rock Ferry
Party	Candidate	Votes	%	±%
Labour	Chris Meaden	3,767	66.7	▲8.6
UKIP	Terry Hansen	617	10.9	▼10.0
Conservative	Cy Ferguson	552	9.8	▲2.1
Green	Paul Harris	430	7.6	▲1.2
Liberal Democrats	Brian Hall	148	2.6	▲0.1
TUSC	Morag Reid	72	1.3	▼0.6
Independent	Jim Pritchard	62	1.1	▼1.4
Majority		3,150	55.8	▲18.6
Registered electors		9,727		
Turnout			58.3	▲31.8
Labour hold		Swing	▲9.3	

=== Seacombe ===
Seacombe
Party	Candidate	Votes	%	±%
Labour	Chris Jones	4,157	71.1	▲11.9
UKIP	Christopher Wellstead	726	12.4	▼12.8
Conservative	Christine Jones	581	9.9	▲2.2
Green	Lily Clough	244	4.2	▼1.7
TUSC	Gregory North	75	1.3	New
Independent	Karl Mercer	64	1.1	▼0.8
Majority		3,431	58.7	▲24.7
Registered electors		10,309		
Turnout			57.1	▲30.4
Labour hold		Swing	▲12.4	

=== Upton ===
Upton
Party	Candidate	Votes	%	±%
Labour	Tony Smith	5,347	62.4	▲13.6
Conservative	Geoffrey Gubb	1,807	21.1	▲1.9
UKIP	Geoffrey Caton	853	9.9	▼13.9
Green	Marian Hussenbux	306	3.6	▼1.6
Liberal Democrats	Alan Davies	262	3.1	▲0.1
Majority		3,540	41.3	▲16.3
Registered electors		12,394		
Turnout			69.6	▲36.7
Labour hold		Swing	▲8.2	

=== Wallasey ===
Wallasey
Party	Candidate	Votes	%	±%
Conservative	Paul Hayes	3,831	44.8	▼4.0
Labour	Giuseppe Roberto	3,309	38.7	▲10.2
UKIP	Brian Farrell	647	7.6	▼5.5
Green	Cynthia Stonall	464	5.4	▼0.9
Liberal Democrats	John Codling	302	3.5	▲0.2
Majority		522	6.1	▼14.2
Registered electors		11,871		
Turnout			72.5	▲33.8
Conservative hold		Swing	▼7.1	

=== West Kirby and Thurstaston ===
West Kirby and Thurstaston
Party	Candidate	Votes	%	±%
Conservative	David Elderton	4,099	50.6	▲3.0
Labour	Thomas Usher	2,311	28.5	▲1.1
Green	Trevor Desrosiers	582	7.2	▲1.3
Liberal Democrats	John Cresswell	563	6.9	▲3.3
UKIP	Dave Evennett	552	6.8	▼5.9
Majority		1,788	22.1	▲1.9
Registered electors		10,380		
Turnout			78.7	▲36.5
Conservative hold		Swing	▲0.9	

== Changes between 2015 and 2016 ==
Date	Ward	Name	Previous affiliation	New affiliation	Circumstance
?	Bromborough	Steve Niblock	Labour	Independent	Deselected.

== Notes ==
• italics denote the sitting councillor • bold denotes the winning candidate
