= Wirral West =

UK Parliament constituency (since 1983)

Coordinates: 53.3801°N 3.1590°W

- County constituency for the House of Commons
- Interactive map of boundaries since 2024
- Location within North West England
- County: Merseyside
- Electorate: 72,126 (March 2020)
- Major settlements: Greasby, Heswall, Hoylake, Irby, Pensby, West Kirby

Current constituency
- Created: 1983
- Member of Parliament: Matthew Patrick (Labour)
- Seats: One
- Created from: Wirral

Wirral West is a constituency represented in the House of Commons of the UK Parliament by Matthew Patrick of the Labour Party since 2024.

== Constituency profile ==
The constituency is one of four covering the Metropolitan Borough of Wirral. It includes Greasby, Hoylake, West Kirby, Woodchurch, parts of Upton (with other parts of Upton in the Wallasey constituency), Irby, Pensby and Heswall. This is one of the more affluent areas within Merseyside, reflected in higher house prices and wages than the wider North West region.

West Kirby Beach

== History ==
Wirral West was created in 1983 from the northern part of the former Wirral constituency, which had traditionally elected Conservative MPs. Selwyn Lloyd was the predecessor constituency's MP from 1945 to 1976, serving as Foreign Secretary during the Eden ministry, Chancellor of the Exchequer during the Macmillan ministry and becoming Speaker of the Commons in 1971. Raised to the peerage in 1976, Lloyd resigned his seat and the ensuing by-election was won by David Hunt, who became the first MP for Wirral West in 1983. Hunt was a Cabinet member under Margaret Thatcher and John Major, serving as Secretary of State for Employment and twice as Secretary of State for Wales.

Hunt held the seat until 1997, when he lost to barrister Stephen Hesford of the Labour Party, but remained in Parliament as a member of the House of Lords. Hesford increased his majority in 2001 and narrowly retained the seat in 2005, despite a challenge at the latter election from former TV presenter and Conservative Esther McVey. On 22 January 2010, he announced his intention to step down at the next general election for family reasons.

New boundary changes implemented, McVey stood again and won the seat for the Conservatives at the 2010 general election, serving in the coalition government as a Work and Pensions minister during her tenure. If implemented in 2005, the 2010 boundary changes would have seen the Conservatives win the seat by 569 votes.

Wirral West had been described as a bellwether since its establishment, but bucked the trend at the 2015 general election when Labour's Margaret Greenwood narrowly defeated McVey, despite the Conservatives winning a parliamentary majority. McVey would successfully contest the Tatton constituency in 2017. Like the nearby City of Chester, the seat was one of the few Conservative-held marginals outside of London to be gained by Labour, who benefited from the constituency's collapse in Liberal Democrat support.

Sixth on the Conservative target list in 2017, Greenwood was comfortably re-elected to Wirral West with the highest winning vote share since the seat was first up for election in 1983. She was promoted to Jeremy Corbyn's shadow cabinet as the Shadow Work and Pensions Secretary in 2018, shadowing McVey who had returned to Parliament as the MP for Tatton. Greenwood was re-elected with a reduced vote share in 2019, and departed from the shadow cabinet upon Keir Starmer's election as Labour leader. She did not stand at the 2024 election and was succeeded by Matthew Patrick who increased Labour's majority to 20%.

== Boundaries ==
=== Historic ===
1983–2010: Metropolitan Borough of Wirral wards of Hoylake, Prenton, Royden, Thurstaston, and Upton.

2010–2024: Metropolitan Borough of Wirral wards of Greasby, Frankby and Irby, Hoylake and Meols, Pensby and Thingwall, Upton, and West Kirby and Thurstaston.

In the 2005 Boundary Commission report, which came into effect for the 2010 election, Wirral West lost Prenton to the Birkenhead constituency, and gained a small area from Wirral South, including the village of Barnston.

=== Current ===
Further to the 2023 review of Westminster constituencies which came into effect for the 2024 general election, the constituency is composed of the following wards of the Metropolitan Borough of Wirral (as they existed on 1 December 2020):

- Clatterbridge; Greasby, Frankby and Irby; Heswall; Hoylake and Meols; Pensby and Thingwall; Upton (polling districts MC, MD and ME); West Kirby and Thurstaston.

To bring the electorate within the permitted range, the Clatterbridge and Heswall wards were added from the abolished constituency of Wirral South. The northern part of the Upton ward was transferred to Wallasey.

== Members of Parliament ==
Election	Member	Party
1983	David Hunt	Conservative
1997	Stephen Hesford	Labour
2010	Esther McVey	Conservative
2015	Margaret Greenwood	Labour
2024	Matthew Patrick	Labour

== Elections ==
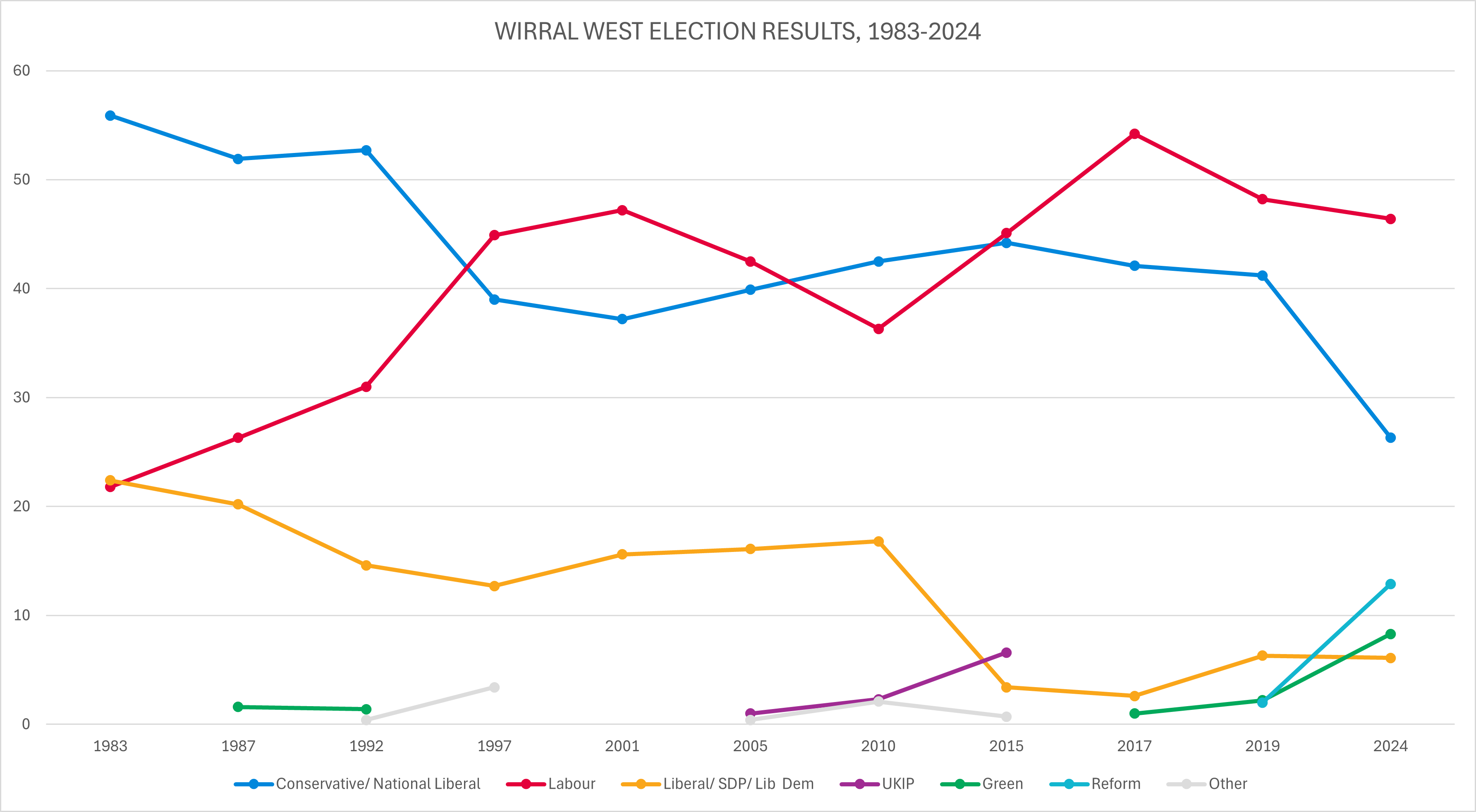
Election results 1983-2024

=== Elections in the 2020s ===
General election 2024: Wirral West
Party	Candidate	Votes	%	±%
Labour	Matthew Patrick	23,156	46.4	+1.2
Conservative	Jenny Johnson	13,158	26.3	–18.1
Reform	Ken Ferguson	6,422	12.9	+10.7
Green	Gail Jenkinson	4,160	8.3	+5.8
Liberal Democrats	Peter Reisdorf	3,055	6.1	+0.4
Rejected ballots		187		
Majority		9,998	20.0	+19.2
Turnout		49,951	68.6	–9.1
Registered electors		72,838		
Labour hold		Swing	▲9.6	

Changes are from the notional 2019 results on the 2024 boundaries.

=== Elections in the 2010s ===
2019 notional result
Party	Vote	%
Labour	25,318	45.2
Conservative	24,863	44.4
Liberal Democrats	3,204	5.7
Green	1,416	2.5
Brexit Party	1,245	2.2
Turnout	56,046	77.7
Electorate	72,126	

General election 2019: Wirral West
Party	Candidate	Votes	%	±%
Labour	Margaret Greenwood	20,695	48.2	–6.1
Conservative	Laura Evans	17,692	41.2	–0.9
Liberal Democrats	Andy Corkhill	2,706	6.3	+3.7
Green	John Coyne	965	2.2	+1.2
Brexit Party	John Kelly	860	2.0	N/A
Majority		3,003	7.0	–5.2
Turnout		42,918	77.5	–1.1
Registered electors		55,550		–0.8
Labour hold		Swing	–2.6	

General election 2017: Wirral West
Party	Candidate	Votes	%	±%
Labour	Margaret Greenwood	23,866	54.3	+9.2
Conservative	Tony Caldeira	18,501	42.1	–2.1
Liberal Democrats	Peter Reisdorf	1,155	2.6	–0.8
Green	John Coyne	429	1.0	N/A
Majority		5,365	12.2	+11.3
Turnout		42,951	78.6	+3.0
Registered electors		55,995		+1.1
Labour hold		Swing	+5.7	

General election 2015: Wirral West
Party	Candidate	Votes	%	±%
Labour	Margaret Greenwood	18,898	45.1	+8.8
Conservative	Esther McVey	18,481	44.2	+1.7
UKIP	Hilary Jones	2,772	6.6	+4.3
Liberal Democrats	Peter Reisdorf	1,433	3.4	–13.4
Independent	David James	274	0.7	–0.1
Majority		417	0.9	N/A
Turnout		41,858	75.6	+4.1
Registered electors		55,377		+0.6
Labour gain from Conservative		Swing	+3.6	

General election 2010: Wirral West
Party	Candidate	Votes	%	±%
Conservative	Esther McVey	16,726	42.5	+0.7
Labour	Phil Davies	14,290	36.3	−4.0
Liberal Democrats	Peter Reisdorf	6,630	16.8	+0.5
UKIP	Philip Griffiths	899	2.3	+1.1
Independent	David Kirwan	506	1.3	N/A
Common Sense	David James	321	0.8	N/A
Majority		2,436	6.2	
Turnout		39,372	71.5	
Registered electors		55,050		
Conservative win (new boundaries)				

=== Elections in the 2000s ===
General election 2005: Wirral West
Party	Candidate	Votes	%	±%
Labour	Stephen Hesford	17,543	42.5	–4.7
Conservative	Esther McVey	16,446	39.9	+2.7
Liberal Democrats	Jeffrey Clarke	6,652	16.1	+0.5
UKIP	John Moore	429	1.0	N/A
Alternative	Roger Taylor	163	0.4	N/A
Majority		1,097	2.6	–7.4
Turnout		41,233	67.5	+2.5
Registered electors		61,050		–2.0
Labour hold		Swing	–3.7	

General election 2001: Wirral West
Party	Candidate	Votes	%	±%
Labour	Stephen Hesford	19,105	47.2	+2.3
Conservative	Chris Lynch	15,070	37.2	–1.8
Liberal Democrats	Simon Holbrook	6,300	15.6	+2.9
Majority		4,035	10.0	+4.1
Turnout		40,475	65.0	–12.0
Registered electors		62,294		+2.3
Labour hold		Swing	+2.1	

=== Elections in the 1990s ===
General election 1997: Wirral West
Party	Candidate	Votes	%	±%
Labour	Stephen Hesford	21,035	44.9	+13.9
Conservative	David Hunt	18,297	39.0	–13.7
Liberal Democrats	John Thornton	5,945	12.7	–1.9
Referendum	Derek Wharton	1,613	3.4	N/A
Majority		2,738	5.9	N/A
Turnout		46,890	77.0	–4.6
Registered electors		60,908		–2.5
Labour gain from Conservative		Swing	+13.8	

General election 1992: Wirral West
Party	Candidate	Votes	%	±%
Conservative	David Hunt	26,852	52.7	+0.8
Labour	Helen Stephenson	15,788	31.0	+4.7
Liberal Democrats	John Thornton	7,420	14.6	–5.6
Green	Garnette Bowler	700	1.4	–0.2
Natural Law	Nigel Broome	188	0.4	N/A
Majority		11,064	21.7	–3.9
Turnout		50,948	81.6	+3.7
Registered electors		62,453		–1.8
Conservative hold		Swing	–2.0	

=== Elections in the 1980s ===
General election 1987: Wirral West
Party	Candidate	Votes	%	±%
Conservative	David Hunt	25,736	51.9	–4.0
Labour	Alexander Dunn	13,013	26.3	+4.5
Liberal	Allan Brame	10,015	20.2	–2.2
Green	David Burton	806	1.6	N/A
Majority		12,723	25.6	–7.9
Turnout		49,570	77.9	+4.5
Registered electors		63,597		+3.2
Conservative hold		Swing	–4.3	

General election 1983: Wirral West
Party	Candidate	Votes	%
Conservative	David Hunt	25,276	55.9
Liberal	Stephen Mulholland	10,125	22.4
Labour	John McCabe	9,855	21.8
Majority		15,151	33.5
Turnout		45,256	73.4
Registered electors		61,646	
Conservative win (new seat)			

== See also ==
- List of parliamentary constituencies in Merseyside
