= Ella Sophia Armitage =

English historian and archaeologist (1841–1931)

- Born: 3 March 1841; West Derby, Liverpool, England
- Died: 20 March 1931 (aged 90); Middlesbrough, England
- Education: Newnham College, Cambridge
- Occupations: Historian; archaeologist
- Spouse: Elkanah Armitage (m. 1874; died 1929)
- Relatives: Amy Bulley (sister); Arthur Bulley (brother); Lois Bulley (niece); Thomas Raffles (grandfather)

Ella Sophia Armitage (née Bulley; 3 March 1841 – 20 March 1931) was an English historian and archaeologist.

== Life ==
Armitage was born Ella Sophia Bulley on 3 March 1841 in West Derby, Liverpool to Samuel Marshall Bulley JP (1811–1880), a cotton merchant, and Mary Rachel Bulley (née Raffles; 1817–1887), the daughter of the Congregational minister Thomas Raffles. One of 14 siblings, Bulley was the sister of Amy Bulley, a promoter of women's education and trade unionist, and Arthur Bulley, a cotton merchant and gardener.

In October 1871, Bulley was one of the first students to enter Newnham College, Cambridge. Two of her sisters also attended Newnham, including Amy Bulley who sat the tripos. In 1874, Bulley became the college's first research student. The same year, on 30 July, Bulley married the Congregationalist minister Elkanah Armitage (1844–1929), with whom she had two children. From 1877 to 1879, Armitage taught history at Owens College, Manchester with her sister Amy, and in 1919 was awarded an honorary degree from Manchester. In Manchester she developed her interest in mediaeval earthworks and castles. In 1887 she became the first woman on the school board at Rotherham, and in 1894 she was appointed assistant commissioner to James Bryce on the Royal Commission on Secondary Education to investigate girls' education in Devon.

Armitage – along with John Horace Round, George Neilson, and Goddard Henry Orpen – proved in a string of publications that British motte-and-bailey castles, which had previously been assumed to be of Anglo-Saxon origin, were not constructed until after the 1066 Norman Conquest of England. Her book The Early Norman Castles of the British Isles is considered a seminal work on the subject. She also contributed to volume 2 of the Victoria County History, of Yorkshire, writing on ancient earthworks.

She was also known as a hymnwriter, apparently saying "I believe I was intended by nature for an archaeologist, but life has made me a hymn writer, and I shall be content to be known as such when my archaeology is forgotten." In 1881 she published sixteen hymns in the collection The Garden of the Lord.

== Works ==
- Armitage, Ella S. (1877). The Childhood of the English Nation or the Beginnings of English History. London: Longmans, Green, and Co.
- Armitage, Ella S. (1881). Richard I and Edward I. London: Longmans, Green, and Co.
- Armitage, Ella S. (1885). The Connection Between England and Scotland. London: Rivingtons.
- Armitage, Ella S. (1905). A key to English Antiquities: with special reference to the Sheffield and Rotherham district. London: J. M. Dent & Co.
- Armitage, Ella S. (1912). The Early Norman Castles of the British Isles. London: J. Murray.
