= SS Benwood =

Steam cargo ship of the early twentieth century

Coordinates: 25.0527°N 80.3337°W

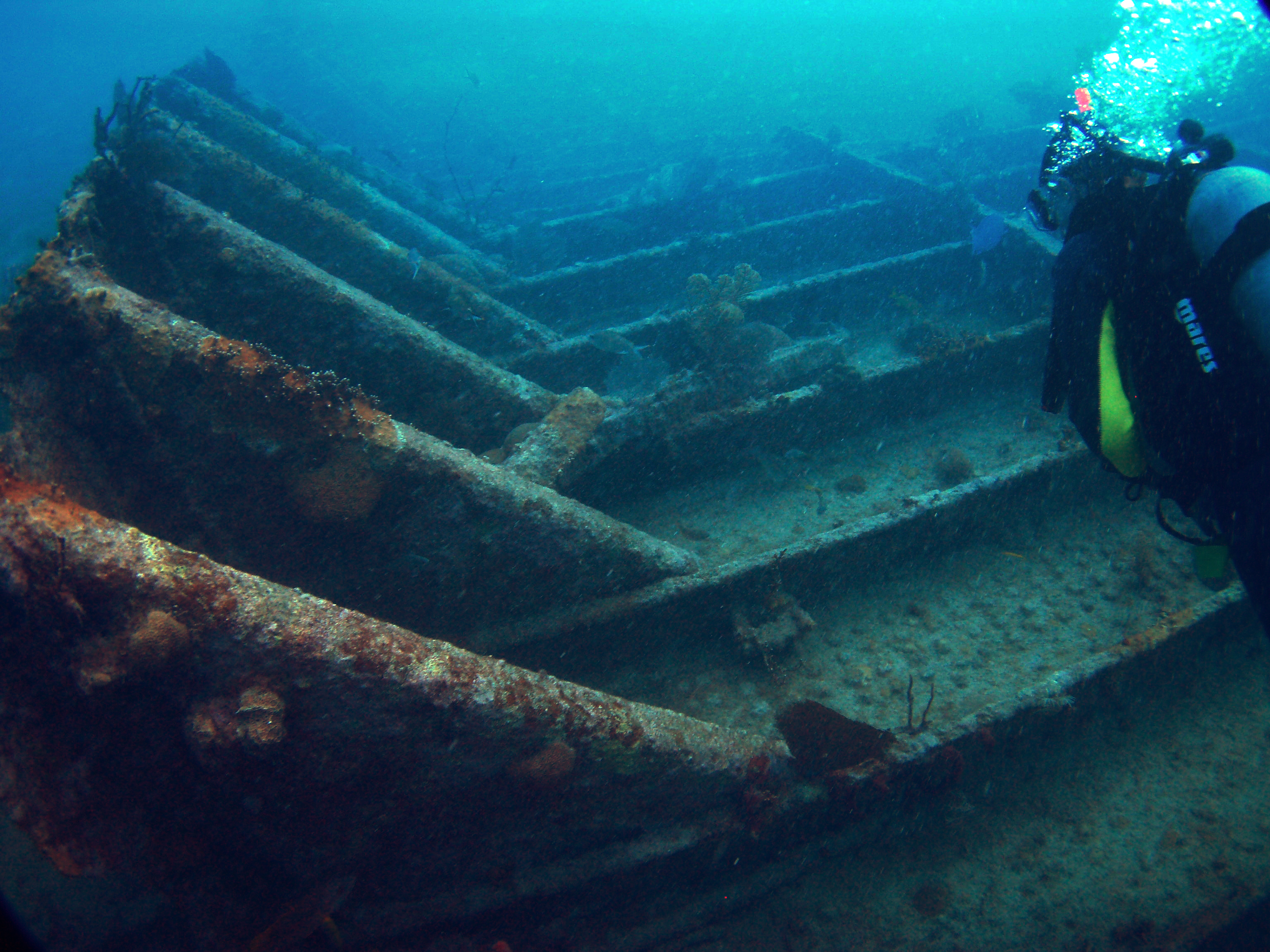
- A diver checks out the structure of the ribs of the ship.

History
- Name: SS Benwood
- Owner: Joseph Hoult & Co. Ltd, Liverpool (1909–1914); Steam Transport Co. Ltd. (Joseph Hoult & Co. Ltd.), Liverpool (1914–1915); Adam Steamship Co. Ltd. (Adam Bros.), Aberdeen (1915–1918); London-American Maritime Trading Co. (Petersen & Co.), London (1918–1923); Skjelbreds Red. A/S, Kristiansand (1923–1940); Kr. Knudsen (1940–1942)
- Builder: Craig, Taylor & Co Ltd., Stockton on Tees
- Launched: 27 November 1909
- Completed: 1 January 1910
- Fate: Sank on 9 April 1942

General characteristics
- Type: Freighter
- Length: 345 ft (105 m)
- Beam: 51.2 ft (15.6 m)
- Depth: 25.4 ft (7.7 m)
- Propulsion: T3cyl (24, 40, 66 x 45in), 342nhp, 1 screw
- Crew: 38
- Armament: 12 rifles, one 4-inch gun, six depth charges and 36 bombs

SS Benwood was a steam cargo ship of the early twentieth century. Built by Craig, Taylor & Co Ltd., Stockton on Tees, she entered service with Joseph Hoult & Co. Ltd, Liverpool. She passed through several owners, before being lost in a collision off the coast of Key Largo, Florida in 1942. Her wreck is now a popular dive site.

== Loss ==
The Norwegian merchant freighter Benwood (360'x51') was under the command of Captain Torbjørn Skjelbred on the night of 9 April 1942. She was on a routine voyage from Tampa Bay, Florida to Norfolk, Virginia carrying a load of phosphate rock. That same evening, the Robert C. Tuttle (544'x70') was en route to Atreco, Texas, under the command of Captain Martin Johansen. Due to the threat of attack by German U-boats in the area, the two ships were completely blacked out, each keeping the Florida coastal lights three miles abeam (Benwood) and one and a half miles abeam (Robert C. Tuttle). It is reported that at 12:45 a.m. the Robert C. Tuttle sighted a black object ahead of the ship and turned starboard after signaling "I intend to turn starboard." with one blow of the ship's whistle. There was no response from the other ship. At 12:50 a.m., the Benwood reported to have sighted a black object off her starboard. She sounded the ship's whistle twice indicating, "I intend to turn port." There was no response. It is believed that the two ships were now unwittingly on a collision course with each other. Just before the collision, Captain Skjelbred made last-minute efforts to avoid the Robert C. Tuttle by ordering the engine full astern (fastest reverse). Moments later, the bow of the Benwood punched into the Robert C. Tuttle just aft of the port side bow, above the waterline. This caused the bow of the Benwood to collapse upon itself. The Benwood began taking on water at a brisk rate. Captain Skjelbred turned hard for shore, attempting to save the ship by grounding, but some time between 1:10 and 2:00 a.m. was forced to abandon ship. The Benwood came to rest stern-to on a sandy slope in approximately 25 feet (7.6 m) to 45 feet (14 m) of water between Dixie Shoals (to the north) and French Reef (to the south) off of Key Largo, Florida. One person was killed in the sinking.

== After the sinking ==
On 10 April 1942, the crew of the salvage tug Willet examined the wreck and determined that the keel of the Benwood was broken, and she was a total loss. However, her superstructure and cargo of phosphate rock appear to have been salvaged. Her stern section, once considered a hazard to navigation, seems to have been mostly obliterated by explosions of an unknown type. This salvaging on the ship over the years prompted John Pennekamp Coral Reef State Park to form a protection program in 1959 to prevent further damage to the historical wreckage. Today, the Benwood is a protected resource under the Florida Keys National Marine Sanctuary, which was formed in 1975. Since her sinking, the Benwood has become an artificial reef, providing the only high-profile reef in the immediate vicinity. She is popular with recreational dives, particularly as a night dive site. She lies in 55 feet of sea water with hull plates found in the sand around the perimeter.

== Gallery ==
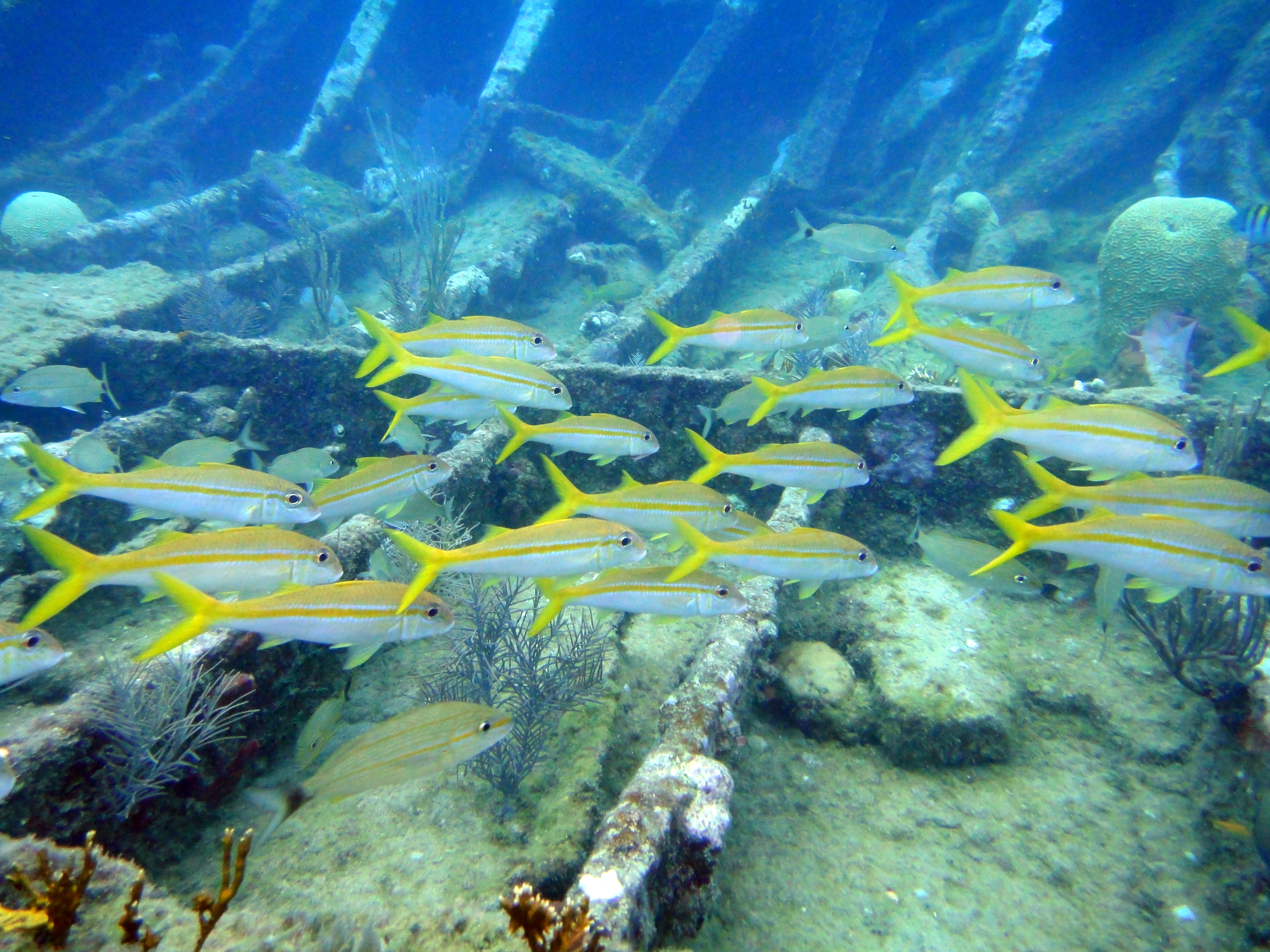
Goatfish on Benwood wreck

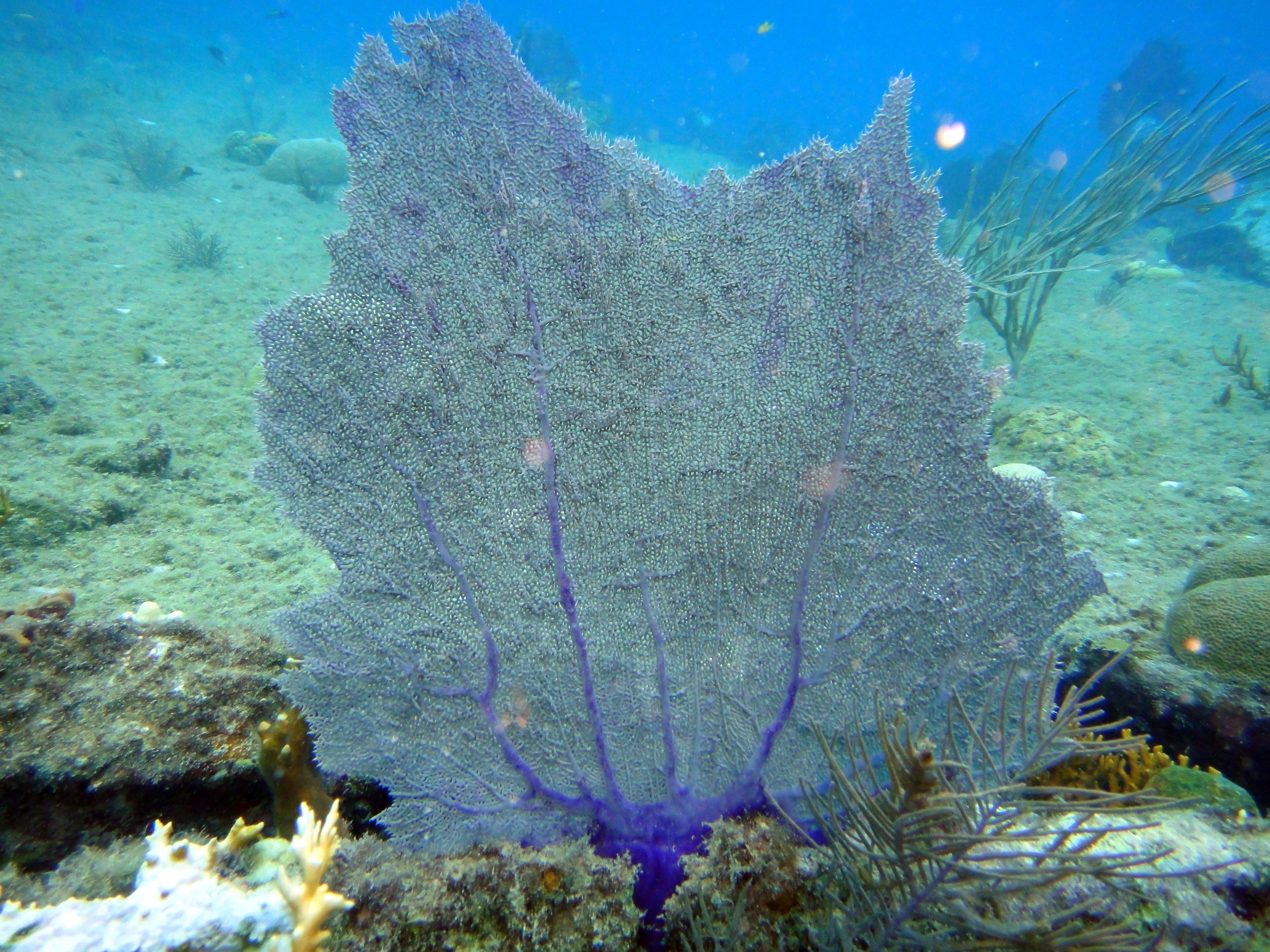
Gorgonia flabellum on Benwood wreck

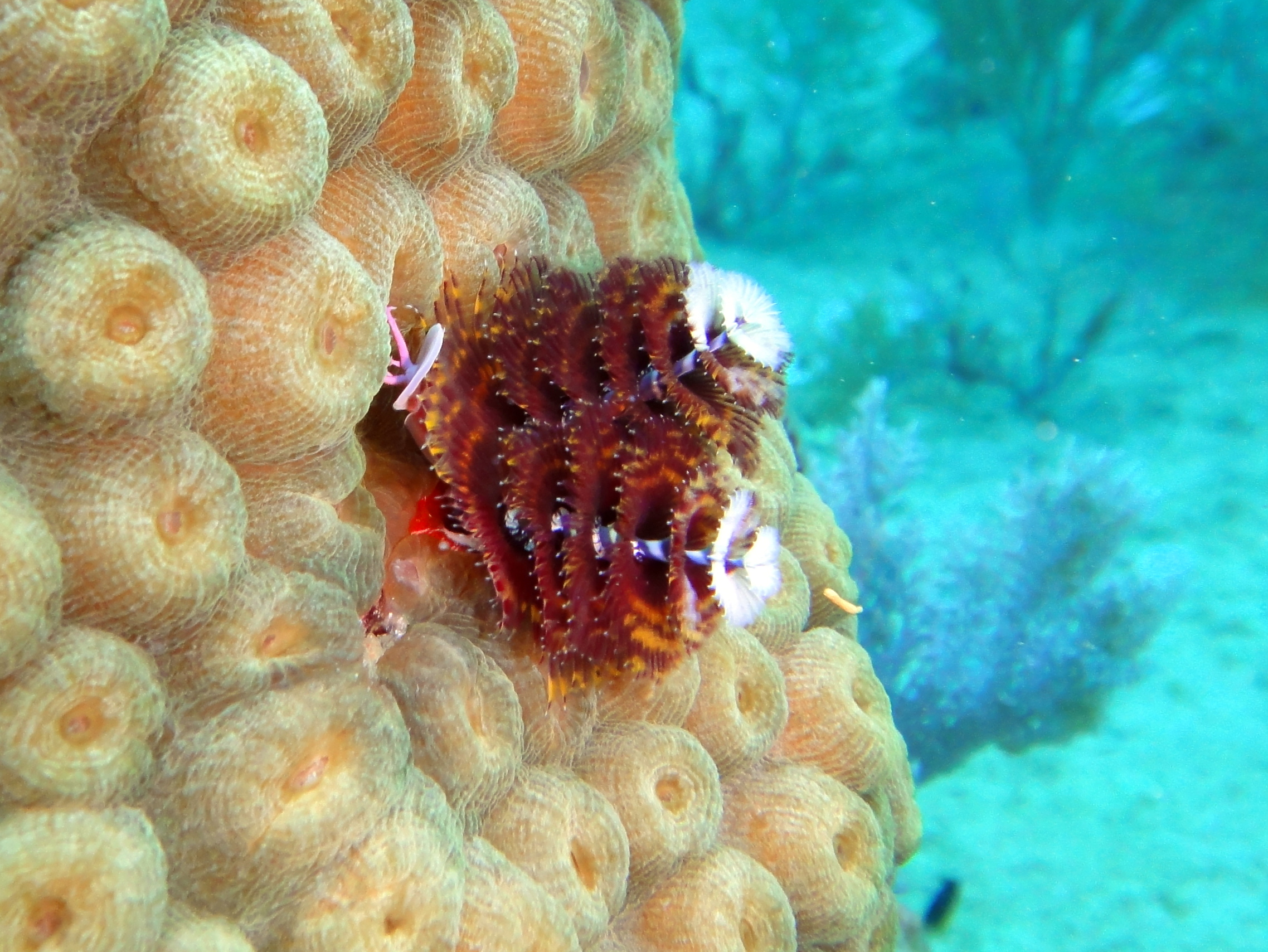
Christmas tree worm on brain coral

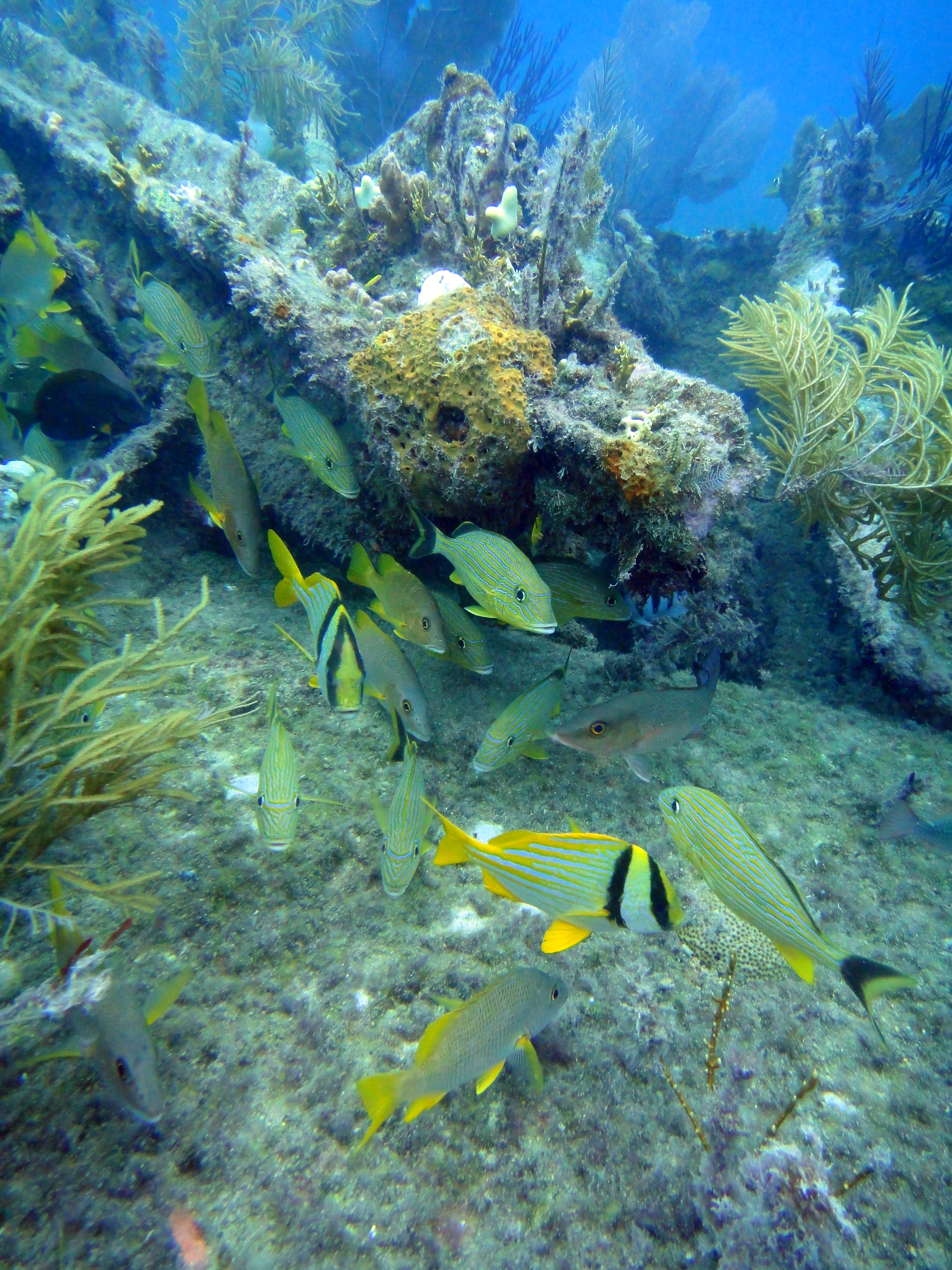
Grunts

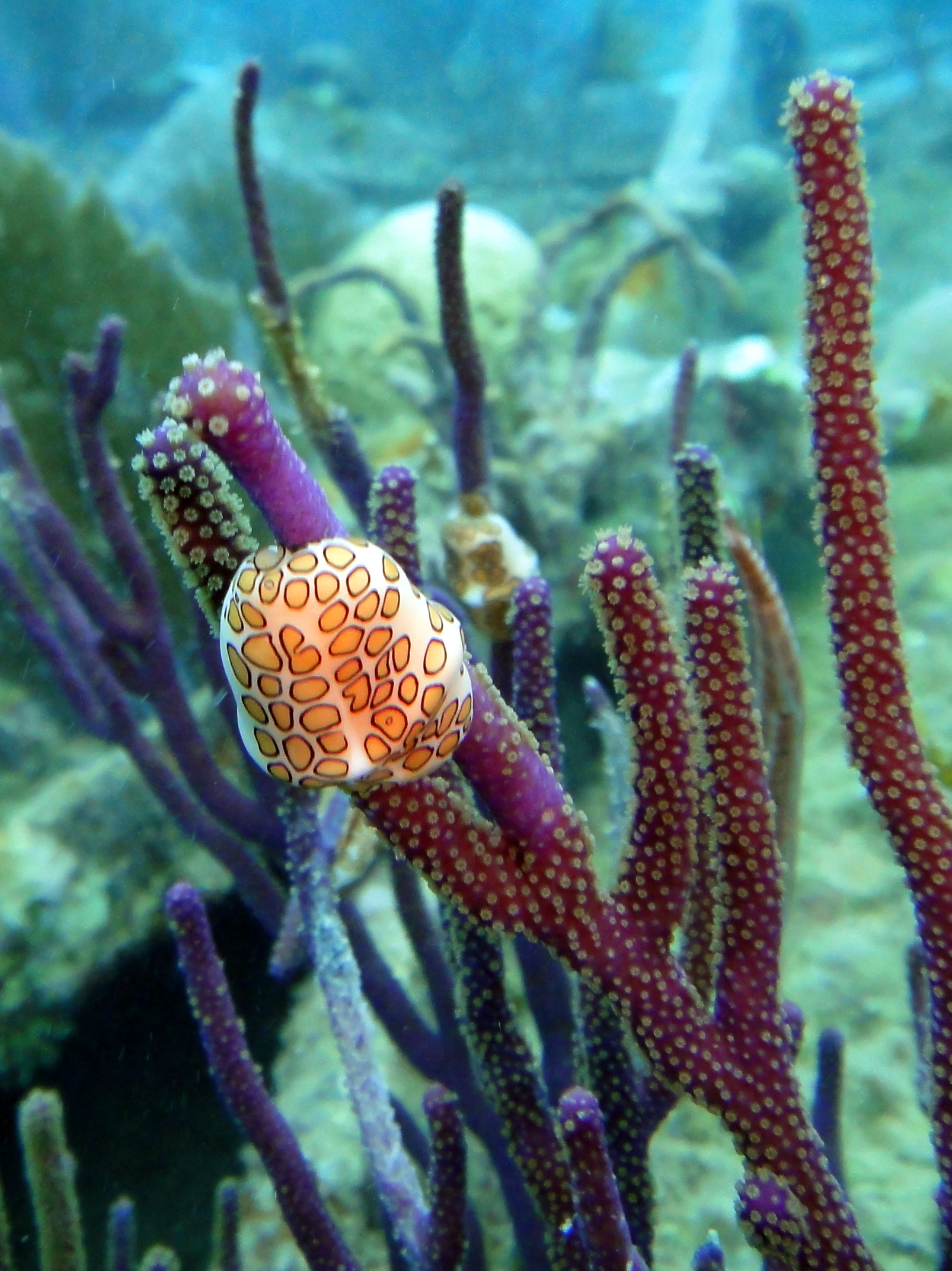
Soft coral

== See also ==
- USS Spiegel Grove shipwreck
- Vandenberg shipwreck
