= Alan Graham =

Alan Graham may refer to:

- Alan R. Graham (born 1942), Canadian politician
- Alan Graham (British politician) (1896–1964), British Conservative politician

== See also ==
- Alan Grahame (1954–2021), English former speedway rider
