= Wirral (constituency) =

Parliamentary constituency in the United Kingdom, 1885–1983

- Former county constituency for the House of Commons
- Boundary of Wirral in Cheshire, boundaries 1974-83
- County: Cheshire

1885–1983
- Seats: one
- Created from: West Cheshire
- Replaced by: Ellesmere Port and Neston, Wirral South, Wirral West and Birkenhead

Wirral was a county constituency which returned one Member of Parliament (MP) to the House of Commons of the Parliament of the United Kingdom from 1885 to 1983, elected by the first past the post voting system.

The constituency was located on the Wirral Peninsula, historically part of Cheshire in North West England.

== History ==
Wirral was created by the Redistribution of Seats Act 1885 for the 1885 general election. As the population of the Wirral peninsula grew, its boundaries were redrawn to allow for additional constituencies to be created. From 1974, its territory was split between the newly created Metropolitan Borough of Wirral, part of the metropolitan county of Merseyside, and the borough of Ellesmere Port and Neston which remained part of Cheshire.

It was abolished for the 1983 general election, and was succeeded by the constituencies of Ellesmere Port and Neston, Wirral South and Wirral West.

== Boundaries ==
1885–1918: The Borough of Birkenhead, and the Hundred of Wirral.

Created as one of eight single-member divisions of Cheshire, replacing the three 2-member divisions. It covered the whole of the historical hundred of Wirral, which included Birkenhead, Wallasey, Neston, Bebington, Ellesmere Port and extended south to the City of Chester. Birkenhead was a separate parliamentary borough, but non-resident freeholders were entitled to vote in the constituency.

1918–1950: The Urban Districts of Bromborough, Ellesmere Port and Whitby, Higher Bebington, Hoylake and West Kirby, Lower Bebington, and Neston and Parkgate, and the Rural District of Wirral.

Wallasey was created as a new parliamentary borough. Southern-most parts transferred to the enlarged City of Chester constituency.

1950–1974: The Urban Districts of Ellesmere Port, Hoylake, Neston, and Wirral.

Parts of the constituency absorbed by the County Boroughs of Birkenhead and Wallasey transferred to the respective constituencies. Area comprising the Municipal Borough of Bebington formed the basis of the new constituency of that name. Other minor changes resulting from reorganisation of local authorities.

The Urban District of Ellesmere Port became a Municipal Borough in 1955.

1974–1983: The Urban Districts of Hoylake, Neston, and Wirral, and the County Borough of Birkenhead wards of Prenton and Upton.

Ellesmere Port transferred to the new constituency of Bebington and Ellesmere Port. Prenton transferred from Bebington, which was now abolished, and Upton transferred from Birkenhead.

From 1 April 1974 until it was abolished for the 1983 general election, Neston remained in Cheshire whilst the rest of the constituency comprised parts of the Metropolitan Borough of Wirral in Merseyside, but its boundaries were unchanged.

On abolition, Hoylake was included in Wirral West, Heswall (the main town in the Urban District of Wirral) in Wirral South and Neston in Ellesmere Port and Neston.

== Members of Parliament ==
Election	Member	Party	Notes
1885	Edward Cotton	Conservative	surname changed to Cotton-Jodrell
1900	Joseph Hoult	Conservative	
1906	William Lever	Liberal	
1910	Gershom Stewart	Conservative	
1923	Stephen Dodds	Liberal	
1924	John Grace	Conservative	
1931	Christopher Clayton	Conservative	
1935	Alan Graham	Conservative	
1945	Selwyn Lloyd	Conservative	
1971	Selwyn Lloyd	Speaker	Resigned 1976
1976 by-election	David Hunt	Conservative	
1983	constituency abolished		

== Election results ==
=== Elections in the 1880s ===
Cotton

General election 1885: Wirral
Party	Candidate	Votes	%	±%
Conservative	Edward Cotton	4,756	59.3	
Liberal	James Tomkinson	3,261	40.7	
Majority		1,495	18.6	
Turnout		8,017	82.0	
Registered electors		9,772		
Conservative win (new seat)				

General election 1886: Wirral
Party	Candidate	Votes	%	±%
Conservative	Edward Cotton	Unopposed		
Conservative hold				

=== Elections in the 1890s ===
General election 1892: Wirral
Party	Candidate	Votes	%	±%
Conservative	Edward Cotton-Jodrell	5,599	64.7	N/A
Liberal	Bernard March-Phillipps De Lisle	3,051	35.3	New
Majority		2,548	29.4	N/A
Turnout		8,650	74.5	N/A
Registered electors		11,610		
Conservative hold		Swing	N/A	

General election 1895: Wirral
Party	Candidate	Votes	%	±%
Conservative	Edward Cotton-Jodrell	Unopposed		
Conservative hold				

=== Elections in the 1900s ===
General election 1900: Wirral
Party	Candidate	Votes	%	±%
Conservative	Joseph Hoult	6,084	54.5	N/A
Liberal	William Lever	5,079	45.5	New
Majority		1,005	9.0	N/A
Turnout		11,163	74.9	N/A
Registered electors		14,899		
Conservative hold		Swing	N/A	

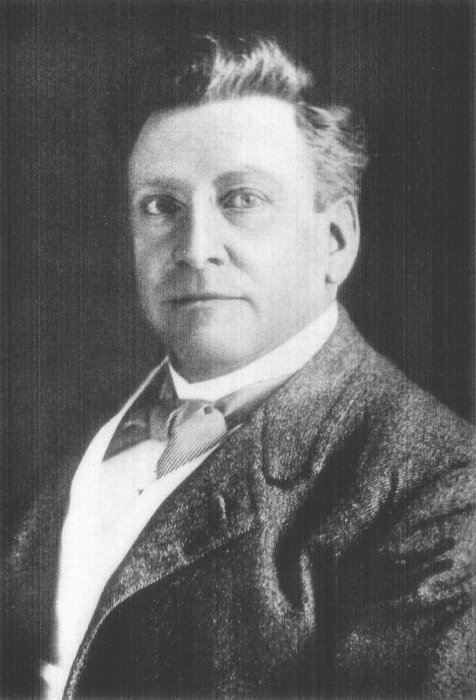
Lever

General election 1906: Wirral
Party	Candidate	Votes	%	±%
Liberal	William Lever	8,833	55.3	+9.8
Conservative	Joseph Hoult	7,132	44.7	−9.8
Majority		1,701	10.6	N/A
Turnout		15,965	82.3	+7.4
Registered electors		19,388		
Liberal gain from Conservative		Swing	+9.8	

=== Elections in the 1910s ===
General election January 1910: Wirral
Party	Candidate	Votes	%	±%
Conservative	Gershom Stewart	10,309	53.8	+9.1
Liberal	E. Peter Jones	8,862	46.2	−9.1
Majority		1,447	7.6	N/A
Turnout		19,171	85.9	+3.6
Conservative gain from Liberal		Swing	+9.1	

General election December 1910: Wirral
Party	Candidate	Votes	%	±%
Conservative	Gershom Stewart	10,043	56.5	+2.7
Liberal	Arthur Jacob Ashton	7,727	43.5	−2.7
Majority		2,316	13.0	+5.4
Turnout		17,770	79.6	−6.3
Conservative hold		Swing		

General Election 1914–15:

Another General Election was required to take place before the end of 1915. The political parties had been making preparations for an election to take place and by July 1914, the following candidates had been selected;

- Unionist: Gershom Stewart
- Liberal: Arthur Jacob Ashton

General election 1918: Wirral
Party		Candidate	Votes	%	±%
C	Unionist	Gershom Stewart	Unopposed		
	Unionist hold				
C indicates candidate endorsed by the coalition government.

=== Elections in the 1920s ===
General election 1922: Wirral
Party	Candidate	Votes	%	±%
Unionist	Gershom Stewart	12,888	51.0	N/A
Liberal	Stephen Roxby Dodds	8,014	31.7	New
Labour	James Edward Cameron Grant	4,363	17.3	New
Majority		4,874	19.3	N/A
Turnout		25,265	74.0	N/A
Unionist hold		Swing		

General election 1923: Wirral
Party	Candidate	Votes	%	±%
Liberal	Stephen Roxby Dodds	13,631	53.6	+21.9
Unionist	Gershom Stewart	11,791	46.4	−4.6
Majority		1,840	7.2	N/A
Turnout		25,422	71.6	−2.4
Liberal gain from Unionist		Swing	+13.3	

General election 1924: Wirral
Party	Candidate	Votes	%	±%
Unionist	John Grace	17,705	60.2	+13.8
Liberal	Stephen Roxby Dodds	11,697	39.8	−13.8
Majority		6,008	20.4	N/A
Turnout		29,402	79.0	+7.4
Unionist gain from Liberal		Swing		

General election 1929: Wirral
Party	Candidate	Votes	%	±%
Unionist	John Grace	23,522	47.5	−12.7
Liberal	Stephen Roxby Dodds	15,158	30.6	−8.2
Labour	George Beardsworth	10,876	21.9	New
Majority		8,364	16.9	−3.5
Turnout		49,556	78.7	−0.3
Unionist hold		Swing		

=== Elections in the 1930s ===
General election 1931: Wirral
Party	Candidate	Votes	%	±%
Conservative	Christopher Clayton	44,935	81.53	
Labour	Stanley Wormald	10,177	18.47	
Majority		34,758	63.06	
Turnout		55,052	77.02	
Conservative hold		Swing		

General election 1935: Wirral
Party	Candidate	Votes	%	±%
Conservative	Alan Graham	41,617	72.58	
Labour	Stanley Wormald	15,801	27.52	
Majority		25,816	44.96	
Turnout		57,418	69.67	
Conservative hold		Swing		

=== Elections in the 1940s ===
General Election 1939–40:

Another General Election was required to take place before the end of 1940. The political parties had been making preparations for an election to take place from 1939 and by the end of this year, the following candidates had been selected;

- Conservative: Alan Graham
- Liberal: Thomas Mercer Banks
- Labour: Lois Bulley

General election 1945: Wirral
Party	Candidate	Votes	%	±%
Conservative	Selwyn Lloyd	42,544	51.40	
Labour	Lois Bulley	25,919	31.32	
Liberal	Eric Dorman-Smith	14,302	17.28	New
Majority		16,625	20.08	
Turnout		82,765	75.40	
Conservative hold		Swing		

=== Elections in the 1950s ===
General election 1950: Wirral
Party	Candidate	Votes	%	±%
Conservative	Selwyn Lloyd	29,232	57.05	
Labour	HA Kelly	15,993	31.21	
Liberal	Thomas Mercer Banks	6,018	11.74	
Majority		13,239	25.84	
Turnout		51,243	85.92	
Conservative hold		Swing		

General election 1951: Wirral
Party	Candidate	Votes	%	±%
Conservative	Selwyn Lloyd	32,631	65.23	
Labour	Reg Chrimes	17,392	34.77	
Majority		15,239	30.46	
Turnout		50,023	81.74	
Conservative hold		Swing		

General election 1955: Wirral
Party	Candidate	Votes	%	±%
Conservative	Selwyn Lloyd	33,027	67.40	
Labour	Reg Chrimes	15,976	32.60	
Majority		17,051	34.80	
Turnout		49,003	76.46	
Conservative hold		Swing		

General election 1959: Wirral
Party	Candidate	Votes	%	±%
Conservative	Selwyn Lloyd	39,807	67.92	
Labour	Frederick W Venables	18,805	32.08	
Majority		21,002	35.84	
Turnout		58,612	82.52	
Conservative hold		Swing		

=== Elections in the 1960s ===
General election 1964: Wirral
Party	Candidate	Votes	%	±%
Conservative	Selwyn Lloyd	32,084	50.05	
Labour	Millicent Aspin	17,445	27.21	
Liberal	Peter Howell Williams	14,574	22.74	New
Majority		14,639	22.84	
Turnout		64,103	81.29	
Conservative hold		Swing		

General election 1966: Wirral
Party	Candidate	Votes	%	±%
Conservative	Selwyn Lloyd	31,477	48.12	
Labour	Dennis V Hunt	21,624	33.06	
Liberal	Peter Howell Williams	12,313	18.82	
Majority		9,853	15.06	
Turnout		65,414	79.72	
Conservative hold		Swing	+3.9	

=== Elections in the 1970s ===
General election 1970: Wirral
Party	Candidate	Votes	%	±%
Conservative	Selwyn Lloyd	38,655	55.1	+7.0
Labour	R Gordon Paterson	22,197	31.7	−1.4
Liberal	Geraldine Jones	9,276	13.2	−5.6
Majority		16,458	23.4	+8.3
Turnout		70,128	74.2	−5.5
Conservative hold		Swing		

General election February 1974: Wirral
Party	Candidate	Votes	%	±%
Speaker	Selwyn Lloyd	38,452	51.2	−3.9
Labour	A. J. Whipp	22,605	30.1	−1.6
Liberal	Michael Gayford	14,123	18.8	+5.6
Majority		15,847	21.1	−2.4
Turnout		75,180	81.5	+7.3
Speaker gain from Conservative		Swing		

General election October 1974: Wirral
Party	Candidate	Votes	%	±%
Speaker	Selwyn Lloyd	35,705	50.8	−0.4
Labour	P. R. Thomas	22,217	31.6	+1.5
Liberal	Michael Gayford	12,345	17.6	−1.2
Majority		13,488	19.2	−1.9
Turnout		70,267	75.5	−6.0
Speaker hold		Swing		

1976 Wirral by-election
Party	Candidate	Votes	%	±%
Conservative	David Hunt	34,675	66.78	+15.97
Labour	Adrian Bailey	10,562	20.34	−11.26
Liberal	Michael Gayford	5,914	11.39	−6.21
English National	Frank Hansford-Miller	466	0.90	New
Ind. Conservative	Hilary Miller	307	0.59	New
Majority		24,112	46.44	+27.24
Turnout		51,924		
Conservative gain from Speaker		Swing		

General election 1979: Wirral
Party	Candidate	Votes	%	±%
Conservative	David Hunt	44,519	59.0	+8.2
Labour	C. Ryder	21,188	28.1	−3.5
Liberal	R. Barnett	9,769	12.9	−4.7
Majority		23,331	30.9	+11.7
Turnout		75,476	77.8	+2.3
Conservative hold		Swing		

== See also ==
- History of parliamentary constituencies and boundaries in Cheshire

Parliament of the United Kingdom
Preceded by Tiverton	Constituency represented by the chancellor of the Exchequer; 1960–1962	Succeeded by Barnet
Preceded by Southampton Itchen	Constituency represented by the speaker 1971–1976	Succeeded by Cardiff West
