= Margaret Greenwood =

British politician (born 1959)

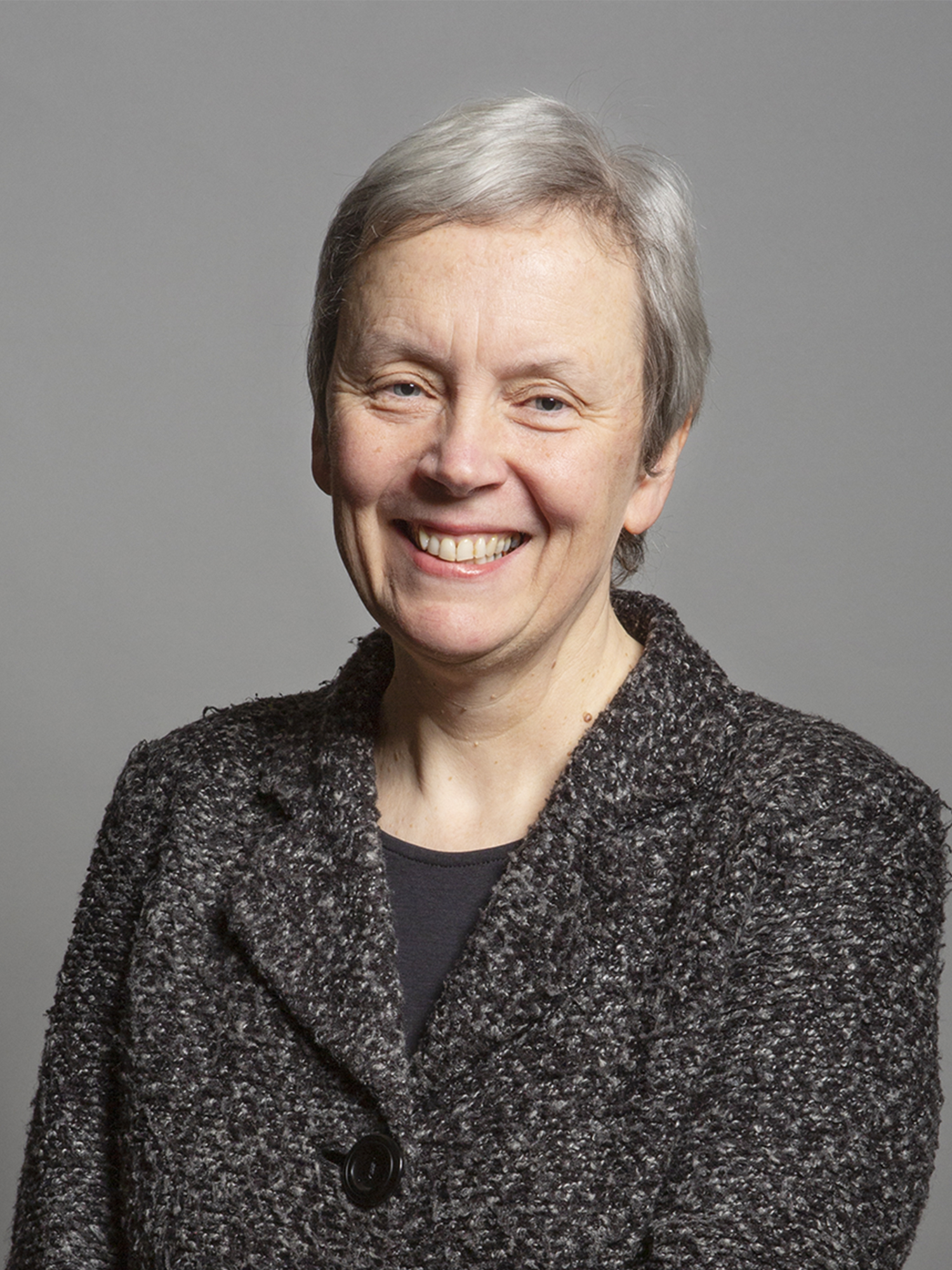
- Official portrait, 2019

Shadow Minister for Schools
- In office 9 April 2020 – 15 October 2020
- Leader: Keir Starmer
- Preceded by: Mike Kane
- Succeeded by: Wes Streeting

Shadow Secretary of State for Work and Pensions
- In office 12 March 2018 (Note: Acting from 12 March to 8 May 2018.) – 6 April 2020
- Leader: Jeremy Corbyn
- Preceded by: Debbie Abrahams
- Succeeded by: Jonathan Reynolds

Shadow Minister for Employment
- In office 9 October 2016 – 8 May 2018
- Leader: Jeremy Corbyn
- Preceded by: Nick Thomas-Symonds
- Succeeded by: Mike Amesbury

Member of Parliament for Wirral West
- In office 7 May 2015 – 30 May 2024
- Preceded by: Esther McVey
- Succeeded by: Matthew Patrick

Personal details
- Born: 14 March 1959 (age 67)
- Party: Labour
- Website: Official website

Margaret Greenwood (born 14 March 1959) is a British politician who served as the Member of Parliament (MP) for Wirral West from 2015 to 2024. She is a member of the Labour Party.

== Biography ==
A former teacher and community activist, Greenwood later worked as a web consultant. She is a founder member of Defend our NHS.

In 2013, she was selected to contest the constituency of Wirral West in the 2015 general election. In a high-profile campaign, Greenwood narrowly unseated the Conservative cabinet minister Esther McVey.

In March 2018, Greenwood began acting as Shadow Secretary of State for Work and Pensions after Debbie Abrahams temporarily stepped aside. She was appointed as a permanent replacement for the Shadow DWP Secretary in May 2018. Until November 2018, Greenwood was shadowing Esther McVey, who had returned to Parliament at the 2017 general election.

In November 2018, Greenwood expressed concern over the effects of poverty and austerity, saying: "The government should listen to the people being pushed into poverty by its policies. Universal credit is failing miserably, leaving families in debt, [in] rent arrears and at risk of becoming homeless. Three million children are growing up in poverty despite living in a working household." Greenwood also said in 2018: "There is something seriously wrong when the number of people in work in poverty is increasing faster than employment."

On 6 April 2020, upon the election of Keir Starmer as Leader of the Labour Party, Greenwood was replaced as Shadow Secretary of State for Work and Pensions by Jonathan Reynolds, becoming Shadow Minister for Schools. She resigned as Shadow Minister for Schools on 15 October 2020 to vote against the Covert Human Intelligence Sources (Criminal Conduct) Bill, which would authorise some undercover police officers and government officials to commit criminal offences, as Labour had whipped MPs to abstain.

On 23 May 2023, Greenwood issued a statement saying that she did not intend to stand for reelection in the 2024 general election.

== Notes ==
Parliament of the United Kingdom
Preceded by Esther McVey	Member of Parliament for Wirral West; 2015–2024	Succeeded by Matthew Patrick
Political offices
Preceded by Debbie Abrahams	Shadow Secretary of State for Work and Pensions; 2018–2020	Succeeded by Jonathan Reynolds
