= Esther McVey =

British politician (born 1967)

The Right Honourable Esther McVey MP
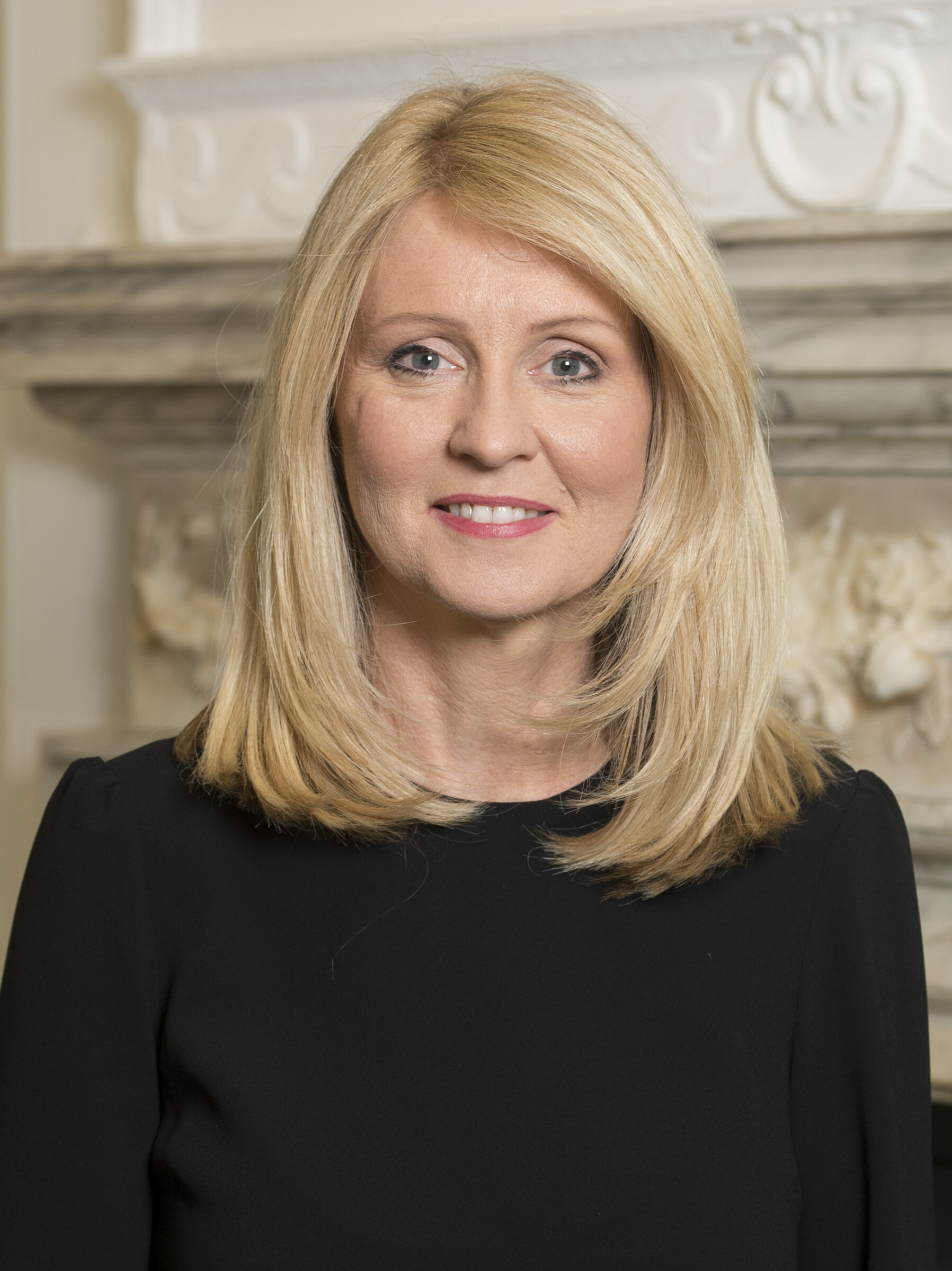
- Official portrait, 2018

Minister of State without Portfolio
- In office 13 November 2023 – 5 July 2024
- Prime Minister: Rishi Sunak
- Preceded by: Gavin Williamson (Note: Office vacant between 8 November 2022 and 13 November 2023)
- Succeeded by: Nick Thomas-Symonds (Note: As Minister for the Constitution and European Union Relations)

Minister of State for Housing and Planning
- In office 24 July 2019 – 13 February 2020
- Prime Minister: Boris Johnson
- Preceded by: Kit Malthouse
- Succeeded by: Chris Pincher

Secretary of State for Work and Pensions
- In office 8 January 2018 – 15 November 2018
- Prime Minister: Theresa May
- Preceded by: David Gauke
- Succeeded by: Amber Rudd

Government Deputy Chief Whip; Treasurer of the Household
- In office 2 November 2017 – 8 January 2018
- Prime Minister: Theresa May
- Preceded by: Julian Smith
- Succeeded by: Chris Pincher

Minister of State for Employment
- In office 7 October 2013 – 8 May 2015
- Prime Minister: David Cameron
- Preceded by: Mark Hoban
- Succeeded by: Priti Patel

Parliamentary Under-Secretary of State for Disabled People
- In office 4 September 2012 – 7 October 2013
- Prime Minister: David Cameron
- Preceded by: Maria Miller
- Succeeded by: Mike Penning

Member of Parliament for Tatton
- Incumbent
- Assumed office 8 June 2017
- Preceded by: George Osborne
- Majority: 1,136 (2.1%)

Member of Parliament for Wirral West
- In office 6 May 2010 – 30 March 2015
- Preceded by: Stephen Hesford
- Succeeded by: Margaret Greenwood

Chair of the British Transport Police Authority
- In office 19 November 2015 – 2 May 2017
- Preceded by: Millie Banerjee
- Succeeded by: Ron Barclay-Smith

Personal details
- Born: Esther Louise McVey; 24 October 1967 (age 59) Liverpool, Lancashire, England
- Party: Conservative
- Spouse: Sir Philip Davies (m. 2020)
- Education: Queen Mary, University of London (LLB); City, University of London (MA); Liverpool John Moores University (MSc)
- Website: esthermcvey.com

Esther Louise McVey (born 24 October 1967) is a British politician and television presenter who has been the Member of Parliament (MP) for Tatton since 2017 and was the MP for Wirral West from 2010 to 2015. A member of the Conservative Party, she served in cabinet as Minister of State for Employment from 2013 to 2015, Secretary of State for Work and Pensions in 2018, Minister of State for Housing and Planning from 2019 to 2020 and Minister of State without Portfolio from 2023 to 2024.

Born in Liverpool, McVey was placed in foster care for the first two years of her life and was then brought up by her biological family. She was privately educated at The Belvedere School before going on to study at Queen Mary University of London and City, University of London. After working at her family's construction business, she became a television presenter, co-presenting GMTV with Eamonn Holmes.

McVey first entered the House of Commons as MP for Wirral West at the 2010 general election. She served in the Cameron–Clegg coalition as Parliamentary Under-Secretary of State for Disabled People from 2012 to 2013, prior to serving as Minister of State for Employment from 2013 to 2015. She was sworn into the Privy Council in 2014 and attended Cabinet after that year's reshuffle. At the 2015 general election she lost her seat; she subsequently spent eighteen months serving as chair of the British Transport Police Authority before returning to parliament following the 2017 general election, succeeding former Chancellor of the Exchequer George Osborne in the Tatton constituency.

McVey served in the second May ministry as Deputy Chief Whip from 2017 to 2018. She was appointed Work and Pensions Secretary in January 2018. In July, she apologised for misleading the House of Commons over the new Universal Credit scheme by claiming a National Audit Office report showed it should be rolled out faster, when in fact the report concluded the roll-out should be paused. She resigned in November 2018 in opposition to Theresa May's draft Brexit withdrawal agreement. She founded the Blue Collar Conservative parliamentary caucus, before standing in the 2019 Conservative Party leadership election, but was eliminated in the first round after finishing in last place with nine votes. Following the contest, she attended Cabinet as Minister of State for Housing and Planning until Boris Johnson's first Cabinet reshuffle.

After leaving the Johnson Cabinet, McVey returned to the backbenches. She subsequently, with her MP husband, jointly hosted weekly programmes on GB News titled Friday and Saturday Morning with Esther and Philip; she also regularly wrote for the Daily Express. In the November 2023 cabinet reshuffle, she was appointed Minister of State without Portfolio by Rishi Sunak, her third Cabinet role, reported to have been tasked with "leading the government's anti-woke agenda".

== Early life and career ==
Esther McVey was born on 24 October 1967 in Liverpool; she is of Irish Catholic descent. She spent the first two years of her life in foster care as a Barnardo's child. She was educated at the (at that time fee-paying, independent) Belvedere School, before reading law at Queen Mary University of London, graduating with an LLB, before graduating with an MA in radio journalism at City, University of London.

From 2000 to 2006, McVey was a director of her family's Liverpool-based construction business J. G. McVey & Co. (run by her father), which specialised in demolition and site clearance, land reclamation and regeneration. In 2003, the firm received two immediate prohibition safety notices with which it complied. Her father has since said that she was "only there in name".

In July 2009, McVey graduated from Liverpool John Moores University with an MSc in corporate governance.

== Media career ==
McVey returned to the family business after university, while undertaking a postgraduate course in radio journalism at City University, before embarking on a career in the media, both as a presenter and producer.

McVey was a co-presenter of the summer holiday Children's BBC strand But First This in 1991, and subsequently presented and produced a wide range of programmes, co-hosting GMTV, BBC1's science entertainment series How Do They Do That?, 5's Company, The Heaven and Earth Show, Shopping City, BBC2's youth current affairs programme Reportage and Channel 4's legal series Nothing But The Truth with Ann Widdecombe. She took part in Eve Ensler's The Vagina Monologues at the Empire Theatre, Liverpool.

McVey returned to Liverpool and set up her own business, Making It (UK) Ltd, which provides training for small and medium-sized enterprises as well as providing office space for new startup businesses, which led to her founding Winning Women, supported by funding from the North West Regional Development Agency.

McVey joined GB News in 2021 to present a weekly show with her husband, titled Saturday Morning with Esther and Phillip. In September 2022, in a shakeup of the channel's schedule, it was announced that the pair would present another show on Friday, titled Friday Morning with Esther and Phillip.

In September 2023, Ofcom said that GB News had breached impartiality rules during an interview that McVey and Davies carried out with Jeremy Hunt on their Saturday morning show earlier that year.

== Parliamentary career ==
At the 2005 general election, McVey stood as the Conservative Party candidate in Wirral West, coming second with 39.9% of the vote behind the incumbent Labour MP Stephen Hesford.

=== 1st term (2010–2015) ===
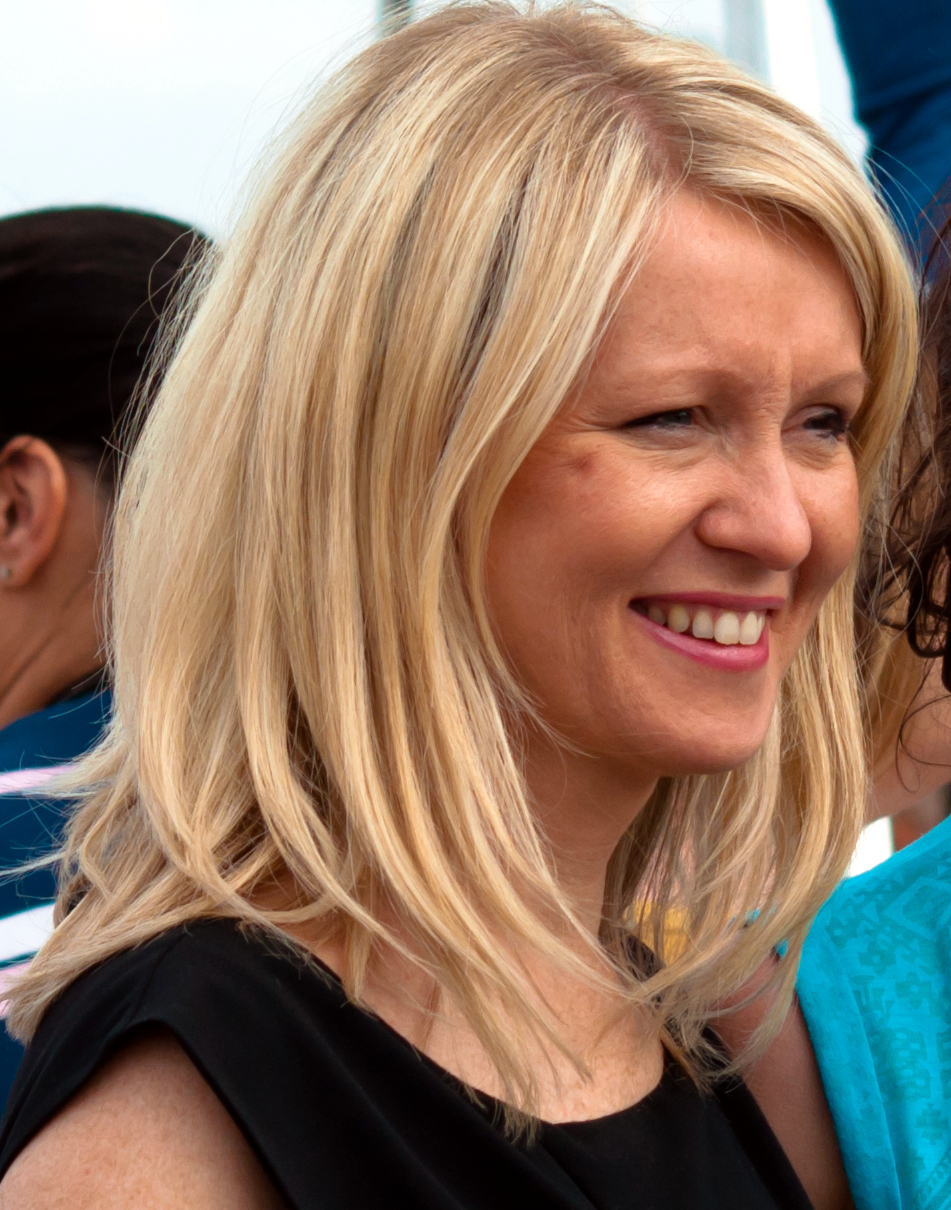
McVey in 2012

At the 2010 general election, McVey was elected to Parliament as MP for Wirral West with 42.5% of the vote and a majority of 2,436.

In November 2010, McVey was parliamentary private secretary to then-Employment Minister Chris Grayling. From 2012 to 2013, she was parliamentary under-secretary of state for Work and Pensions, working under Iain Duncan Smith.

In December 2013, she was formally reprimanded for using House of Commons notepaper and postage to electioneer for the Conservative Party; she apologised and repaid the £300 costs.

David Cameron appointed McVey Minister of State for Employment in the Department for Work and Pensions in an October 2013 reshuffle. This led to McVey being sworn into the Privy Council on 27 February 2014. Shortly after being made Minister for Employment, McVey had the responsibility for the Health and Safety Executive taken away after it was reported that a demolition company had been found to be in violation of health and safety laws while she was director.

In April 2014, McVey apologised for a tweet criticising the Wirral Labour Party that was sent during the Hillsborough memorial service. Social media posts at the time claimed the timing of the tweet showed a lack of respect.

McVey is a supporter of Conservative Way Forward, a Thatcherite organisation.

In November 2014, then-backbench Labour MP John McDonnell discussed a "Sack Esther McVey Day" among Labour activists and politicians, saying that "a whole group in the audience" argued 'Why are we sacking her? Why aren't we lynching the bastard?'" The Conservative Party chairman Grant Shapps called for Labour to withdraw the whip from McDonnell. The official Labour Party Twitter feed said McDonnell's comments "don't represent the views of the Labour Party. He speaks for himself". In 2015, speaking to Robert Peston of ITV, McDonnell defended his comments by saying that he was "simply report[ing] what was shouted out at a public meeting". On the same day as his "lynch" remarks, in a debate in the House of Commons, McDonnell criticised McVey for playing the victim and proceeded to call her a "stain of inhumanity".

=== Out of parliament (2015–2017) ===
At the 2015 general election, McVey was defeated by the Labour candidate Margaret Greenwood, who gained Wirral West with 45.1% of the vote and a majority of 417 votes.

After losing her seat, McVey took up the post of chair of the British Transport Police Authority from November 2015, on a four-year contract. However, ten days after it was announced that the snap 2017 general election would take place, McVey resigned the post. Between the elections, she also held part-time jobs as a special adviser to Irish lobbying firm Hume Brophy, a privately held investment group known as Floreat Group, and a fellowship at the University of Hull.

=== 2nd term (2017–2019) ===
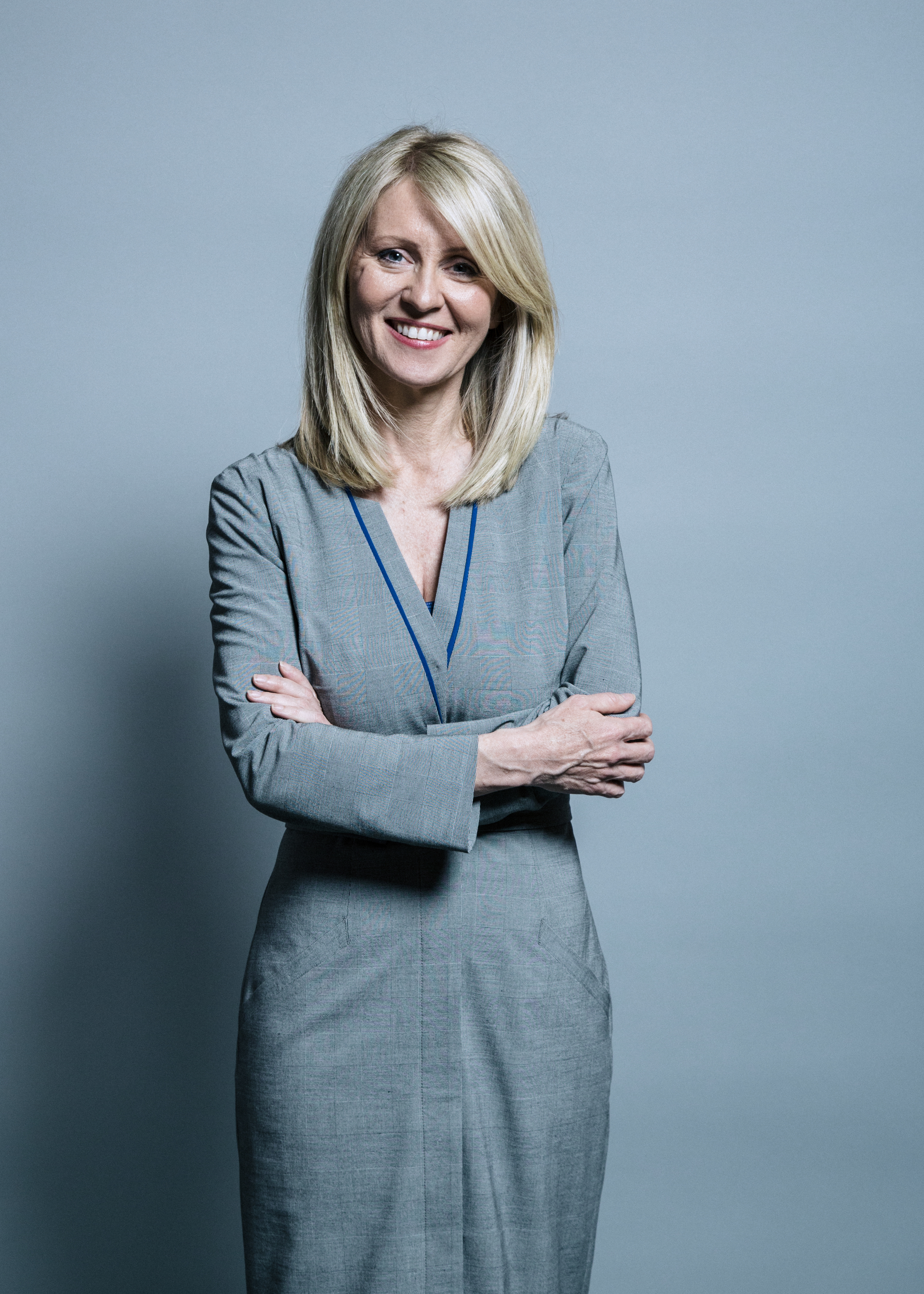
Official portrait, 2017

In April 2017, McVey was selected to succeed George Osborne as the Conservative candidate for the seat of Tatton at the snap 2017 general election. At the snap general election, she was elected as MP for Tatton with 58.6% of the vote and a majority of 14,787.

In the subsequent reshuffle, McVey was appointed Deputy Chief Government Whip.

==== Secretary of State for Work and Pensions (2018) ====
On 8 January 2018, McVey was appointed as Secretary of State for Work and Pensions, a post she held until 15 November 2018 when she resigned over the Brexit deal. Labour MP Dan Carden said McVey's appointment "will put fear in the hearts of the vulnerable and disabled. The last time McVey was at DWP she was ejected from parliament by the voters of Wirral West."

In July 2018, it was reported by the head of the National Audit Office (NAO) that McVey had misled parliament over the new Universal Credit scheme by claiming that the NAO report showed that it should be rolled out faster when in fact the report concluded that the roll-out should be paused. She apologised to the House of Commons on 4 July 2018 amid calls for her resignation. Labour MP Margaret Greenwood (who defeated McVey in her former seat of Wirral West in 2015) said in parliament: "The secretary of state should be ashamed that she has been forced to come to this house again. If she misread this report so badly this brings in to question her competence and her judgment. If she did read the report and chose to misrepresent its findings, she has clearly broken the ministerial code. Either way, she should resign."

McVey said that there were problems with Universal Credit. The Guardian wrote: "Tens of thousands of ESA claimants will receive back-payments of £5,000–£20,000 as a result of what MPs have called a series of 'avoidable' mistakes. The DWP was warned of the error as early as 2014, but failed to take action until 2017."

On 15 November 2018, McVey announced her ministerial resignation over Brexit, following May's publication of the draft proposed deal. She was replaced by former Home Secretary Amber Rudd.

In March 2019, she was criticised, after tweeting a widely discredited claim made in a 2014 newspaper opinion column about the UK, along with other EU states, being forced to join the Euro from 2020, before later deleting it.

==== Conservative Party leadership campaign (2019) ====
In May 2019, McVey announced her intention to run for the leadership of the Conservative Party when Theresa May resigned, claiming that she already had "enough support" to stand. Later that month, McVey launched Blue Collar Conservatives, as part of her leadership campaign, with MPs such as Scott Mann, Iain Duncan Smith and her partner Philip Davies in attendance.

McVey finished in last place after the first ballot of the Conservative Party leadership candidates and was eliminated.

==== Minister of State for Housing and Planning (2019–2020) ====
Following Boris Johnson winning the leadership contest and becoming Prime Minister in July 2019, McVey returned to the cabinet when he made her Minister of State for Housing and Planning.

=== 3rd term (2019–2024) ===
At the 2019 general election, McVey was re-elected as MP for Tatton with a decreased vote share of 57.7% and an increased majority of 17,387.

McVey later became a correspondent and later a presenter for the right-leaning television channel GB News. She was criticised by the chair of the Advisory Committee on Business Appointments, Eric Pickles, for breaking anti-lobbying rules within the Ministerial Code in accepting the job at GB News while she was still the housing minister.

In February 2020, McVey was dismissed in Johnson's post-Brexit reshuffle.

==== Backbencher (2020–2023) ====
After returning to the backbenches, McVey was a critic of her party's lockdown measures during the COVID-19 pandemic and broke the party whip to vote against further restrictions. She also called for the government to stop building HS2 due to its high cost, the burden of which, she believed, would be placed on the taxpayer.

McVey endorsed Jeremy Hunt in the July 2022 Conservative Party leadership election. She was his candidate for Deputy Prime Minister.

In May 2023, McVey led six Conservative MPs in a letter warning against giving the World Health Organization new powers.

==== Return to the Cabinet: Minister of State without Portfolio (2023–2024) ====
In the November 2023 British cabinet reshuffle, McVey was appointed Minister of State without Portfolio in the Cabinet Office by Rishi Sunak, reportedly tasked with "leading the government's anti-woke agenda" as a "minister for common sense".

In May 2024, McVey said that she wanted to tackle "left-wing politically correct woke warriors" in the public sector and suggested that civil servants could be banned from wearing rainbow lanyards. McVey addressed this through updated Civil Service diversity guidance, which on publication did not explicitly ban civil servants from wearing rainbow lanyards.

=== 4th term (2024–) ===
At the 2024 general election, McVey was again re-elected, with a decreased vote share of 38.4% and a decreased majority of 1,136. McVey subsequently returned to the backbenches after not being offered roles in either the Shadow frontbench teams of Rishi Sunak or Kemi Badenoch.

== Elections contested ==
Election	Constituency	Party	Votes	%	Result	Position
2005 general election	Wirral West	Conservative	16,446	39.9	Not elected	2nd / 5 candidates
2010 general election	Wirral West	Conservative	16,726	42.5	Elected	1st / 6 candidates
2015 general election	Wirral West	Conservative	18,481	44.2	Not elected	2nd / 5 candidates
2017 general election	Tatton	Conservative	28,764	58.6	Elected	1st / 5 candidates
2019 general election	Tatton	Conservative	28,277	57.7	Elected	1st / 4 candidates
2024 general election	Tatton	Conservative	19,956	38.4	Elected	1st / 5 candidates

== Personal life ==
McVey was previously in relationships with BBC producer Mal Young and Conservative former frontbencher Ed Vaizey. When in London, she shared a flat in Pimlico with Conservative colleague Philip Davies; the arrangement ended when McVey lost her seat at the 2015 general election. In May 2019, the BBC's Politics Live programme reported that she and Davies were engaged. On 19 September 2020, McVey married Davies in a private ceremony at Westminster, in Parliament's St Mary Undercroft chapel.

== Notes ==
Parliament of the United Kingdom
Preceded by Stephen Hesford	Member of Parliament for Wirral West; 2010–2015	Succeeded by Margaret Greenwood
Preceded by George Osborne	Member of Parliament for Tatton; 2017–present	Incumbent
Government offices
Preceded by Maria Miller	Undersecretary of State for Disabilities; 2012–2013	Succeeded by Mike Penning as Minister of State for Disabilities
Preceded by Mark Hoban	Minister of State for Employment; 2013–2015	Succeeded by Priti Patel
Preceded by Julian Smith	Treasurer of the Household; Deputy Chief Whip of the House of Commons; 2017–2018	Succeeded by Chris Pincher
Preceded by David Gauke	Secretary of State for Work and Pensions; 2018	Succeeded by Amber Rudd
Preceded by Kit Malthouse	Minister of State for Housing and Planning; 2019–2020	Succeeded by Chris Pincher
Vacant Title last held by Gavin Williamson	Minister of State without Portfolio; 2023–2024	Succeeded by Ellie Reeves
Party political offices
Preceded by Julian Smith	Conservative Deputy Chief Whip in the House of Commons; 2017–2018	Succeeded by Chris Pincher
