= John Grace (British politician) =

John Grace (16 November 1886 – 8 December 1972) was a British Conservative Party politician. He sat in the House of Commons in the 1920s.

== Political career ==
At the 1924 general election, Grace was elected as the member of parliament (MP) for the Wirral division of Cheshire, defeating the one-term Liberal MP Stephen Roxby Dodds. He was re-elected in 1929, and held the seat until he stood from Parliament at the 1931 general election.

Parliament of the United Kingdom
Preceded by Stephen Roxby Dodds	Member of Parliament for Wirral; 1924–1931	Succeeded by Christopher Clayton
