= Stephen Roxby Dodds =

Stephen Roxby Dodds

Stephen Roxby Dodds (29 January 1881 – 10 September 1943) was an English lawyer and Liberal politician.

== Family and education ==
Dodds was born in Birkenhead in Cheshire the son of T L Dodds, a local justice of the peace and his wife Jane. He was educated at Rydal School in Colwyn Bay and at Trinity Hall, Cambridge where he gained MA and LL.B degrees. He married Edith May Bell from Heswall in Cheshire. They never had children. In religion he was a Methodist.

== Career ==
Dodds went in for the law. He was articled as a clerk to a firm of Liverpool solicitors in 1903 and was admitted as a solicitor in 1906. In 1910, he was a founder of the firm of Dodds, Ashcroft & Cook with premises at 24 Fenwick Street, Liverpool. He was qualified as a solicitor, Commissioner for Oaths and Notary Public. He also served as a Justice of the Peace.

== Politics ==
Dodds contested the Wirral Division of Cheshire as a Liberal at the 1922 general election coming second to the sitting Conservative MP, Gershom Stewart in a three-cornered contest. Dodds fought Wirral again at the 1923 general election when, in the absence of a Labour candidate, he won the seat from Stewart with a majority of 1,840 votes. Despite Labour's withdrawal, it was still expected that Stewart would hold the seat. The Conservatives had revived by the time of the 1924 general election when the new Tory candidate, John Grace, regained the Wirral from Dodds in a straight fight.

Dodds tried to win the Wirral constituency once more, at the 1929 general election but this time Labour were back in the field and he again came runner-up to Grace, a local barrister, with Labour candidate George Beardsworth, a trade union official in third place.

== Other appointments ==
Dodds served as President of the Liverpool Law Society, 1939–40 and was a member of the Council of the Law Society (London). He was also President of the Literary and Philosophical Society of Liverpool, 1925–26, and again in 1926–27 and President of the Birkenhead Literary and Scientific Society in 1914. He served as Chairman of the Board of Governors of his old school, Rydal School and was also a Governor of Wirral Grammar School and Wirral County School for Girls.

== Death ==
Dodds died suddenly at his home, Heath Moor, Heswall in Cheshire on 10 September 1943 aged 62 years.

Parliament of the United Kingdom
Preceded by Gershom Stewart	Member of Parliament for Wirral Division of Cheshire; 1923–1924	Succeeded by John Grace
