= Amy Bulley =

English women's activist (1852–1939)

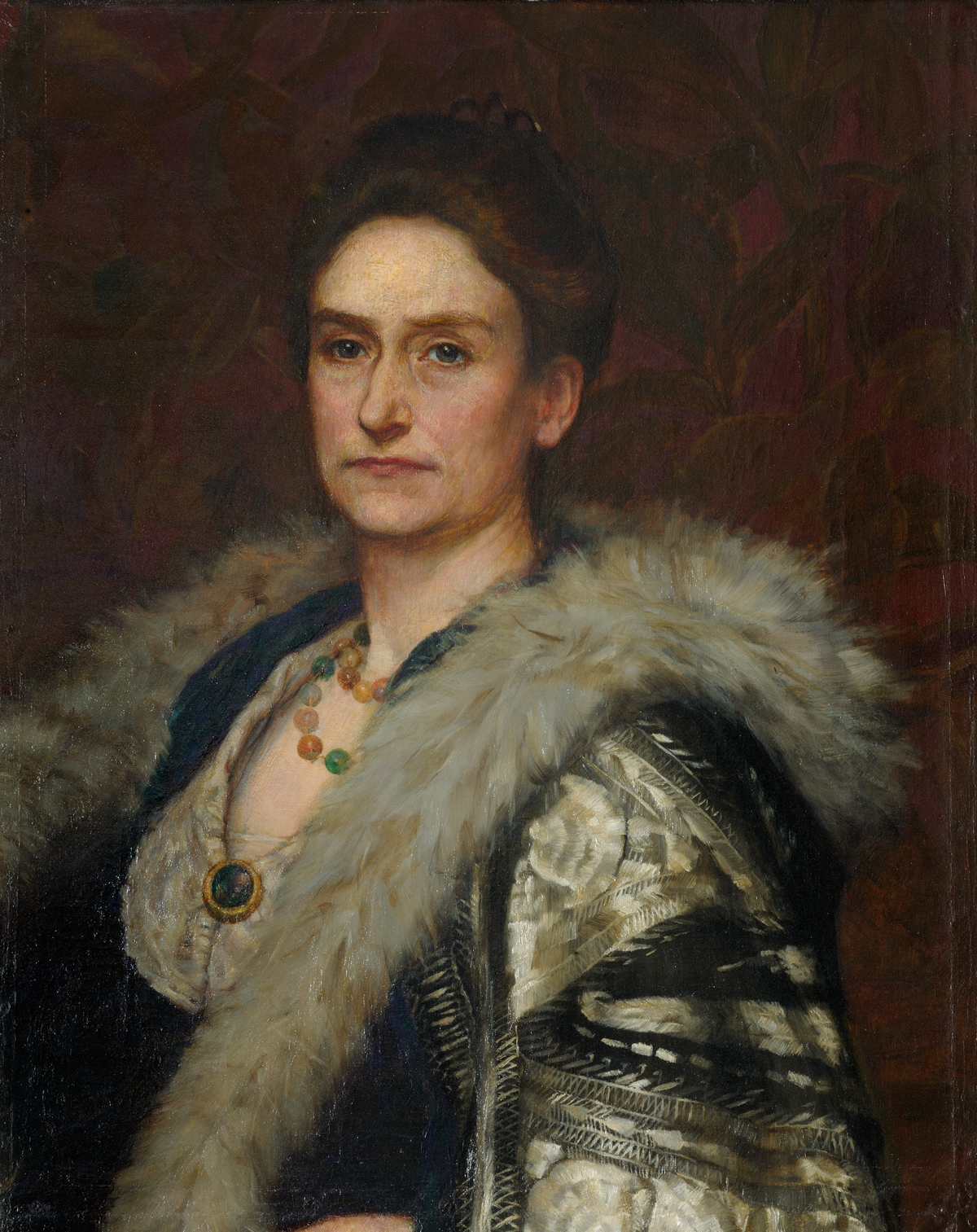
- Mrs Amy Brook (born Bulley); portrait by Mary Florence Monkhouse at Newnham College
- Born: Agnes Amy Bulley; 20 April 1852; Liscard, Cheshire, England
- Died: 16 November 1939 (aged 87); Bushey, Hertfordshire, England
- Education: Girton College, Cambridge and Newnham College, Cambridge
- Occupations: Teacher and educator
- Employer: Manchester High School for Girls
- Spouse: Joseph Brooke

Agnes Amy Bulley (20 April 1852 – 16 November 1939) was an English promoter of women's education. She was an early student at both Girton College, Cambridge and Newnham College and one of the first two female students to sit the tripos examinations in Cambridge. She entered education where she helped to create a "women's department" at what would be Manchester University. She wrote about women's rights and the growth of "white blouse" employment.

== Life ==
Bulley was born in Liscard on the Wirral in 1852. Her parents were cotton merchant Samuel Marshall Bulley and Mary Rachel née Raffles. She was one of fourteen children and one of the three daughters who were unusually sent to college. Her two sisters, Ella and Caroline went to the newly founded Newnham College, Cambridge whilst Amy went to Girton College, Cambridge. Ella was one of Newnham's first five students. After three years she moved to Newnham College where she joined her sisters to complete a fourth year. The principal of Newnham, Anne Clough, was a friend of their parents and had persuaded Mr and Mrs Bulley to send their daughters south.

Bulley and Mary Paley were the first women to take the tripos examination at Cambridge University. The people who delivered Paley and Bulley's papers were Henry Sidgwick, John Venn, Sedley Taylor and Paley's future husband Alfred Marshall. She took the Tripos in 1874, and had she been a man then she would have been awarded a second-class degree but this was denied her because she was a woman. They sat the exams in Professor Benjamin Hall Kennedy's drawing room. Paley described how Professor Kennedy would sometimes doze whilst invigilating. Paley created a sketch of Sedley Taylor delivering the exam papers.

In 1876, she became an assistant mistress at Manchester High School for Girls where she taught and in her spare time gave support to the growing demand for more higher education for girls. The Manchester and Salford College for Women was founded in 1876. This was not an easy task as the girls involved found the work difficult as they had not been prepared for higher education. Numbers grew slowly from 46 to 50 and by 1883, there were eighty students. The college was now operating and this created sufficient pressure on the Owens College that it created a women's department in 1883. Bulley served as secretary to the college and despite her interventions only a few students would attend examinations because of the fear of failure. Bulley arranged for students to stay behind to have tea with her as she knew that they would normally return straight home and not enjoy any camaraderie.

Bulley took an interest in worker's rights when she left Manchester High School for Girls in 1886. She switched careers to journalism where she wrote for the Manchester Guardian. The switch was possible because she had already established a reputation for writing when she had written Middle Class Education in England in 1881. In 1894 she and Margaret Whitley published Women's Work.

In 1907, she married Joseph Brooke who was her sister Mary's widower. Three years later, her botanist brother, Arthur Bulley stood for parliament on behalf of the women's suffrage movement. When her husband died in 1912, she moved to Bushey in Hertfordshire where she died in 1939.

== Selected works ==
- Middle Class Education in England, (1881)
- Domestic service: a social study, Westminster Review (1891)
- Report on the employment of women Fortnightly Review, (1894)
- Women's Work with Margaret Whitley, (1894)
- The political evolution of women, Westminster Review, (1890)
- Edwin Waugh, the Lancashire poet, (Temple Bar, October 1890)
- The Eucharist (anthropology) (1910)
- The Peace Song of Ireland (Song)(1911)
