= Christopher Clayton (businessman) =

British scientist, industrialist and politician

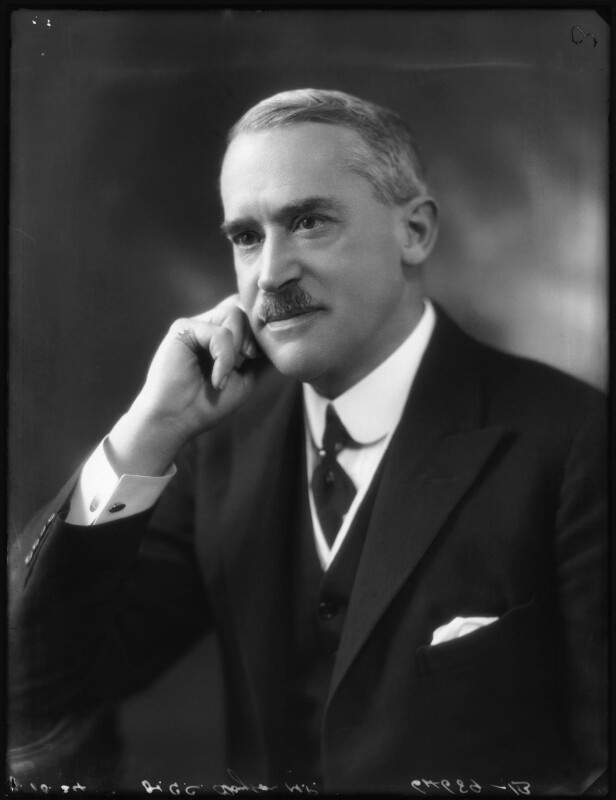
Clayton in 1924

Sir George Christopher Clayton CBE FRIC JP (11 July 1869 – 28 July 1945) was a British scientist, industrialist and Conservative politician.

Clayton was educated at Harrow School and Heidelberg and graduated from University College, Liverpool with a PhD in chemistry in 1896. On graduation he obtained a post with the United Alkali Company of Widnes. In 1907 he joined the board of the company. When United Alkali was merged with three other chemical companies to form Imperial Chemical Industries in 1926, Clayton became a director of ICI.

At the 1922 general election he succeeded in regaining the Widnes constituency for the Conservative party. He held the seat until the 1929 election when he was defeated by his Labour Party opponent. In 1925 he was appointed by Order in Council to the Board of Trade Advisory Council for Scientific and Industrial Research. At the 1931 general election he returned to parliament as MP for the Wirral Division of Cheshire. He was President of the Royal Institute of Chemistry from 1930 to 1933 and was knighted in 1933. He only sat for one term, retiring in 1935 due to his business commitments.

Apart from being a director of ICI, Clayton was also chairman of the Liverpool Gas Company and vice-chairman of the Power Gas Corporation.

Clayton married Mabel Valentine Grainger of Perth in 1896, and made his home at Kilry Lodge, Alyth, Perthshire, where he died in 1945 aged seventy-six.

Parliament of the United Kingdom
Preceded by Arthur Henderson	Member of Parliament for Widnes; 1922–1929	Succeeded by Alexander Gordon Cameron
Preceded by John Grace	Member of Parliament for Wirral; 1931–1935	Succeeded by Alan Crosland Graham
