= Matthew Patrick (British politician) =

British politician

Matthew Patrick MP
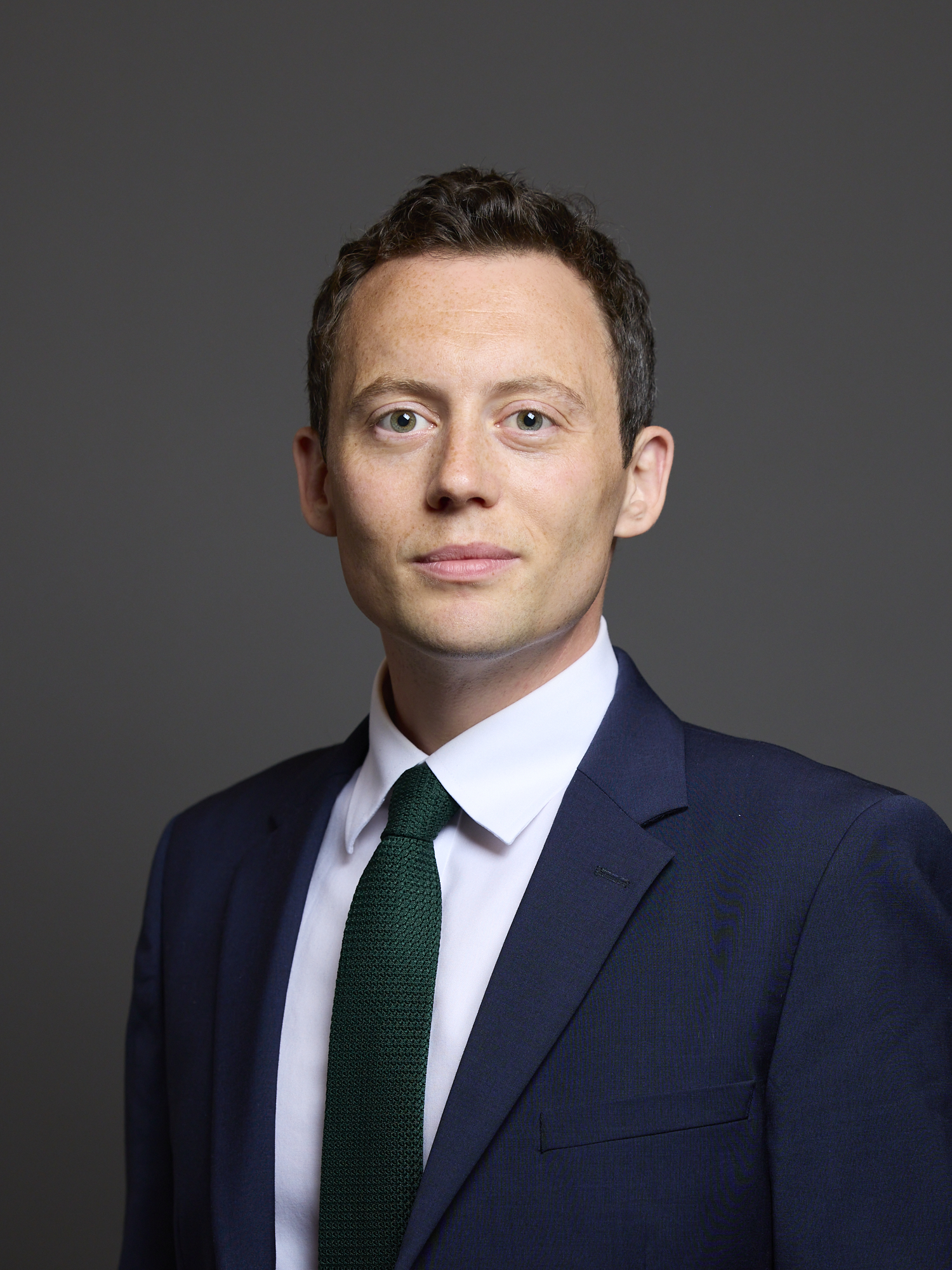
- Official portrait, 2024

Parliamentary Under-Secretary of State for Northern Ireland
- In office 7 September 2025 – 22 July 2026
- Prime Minister: Keir Starmer
- Preceded by: Fleur Anderson
- Succeeded by: Sarah Owen

Member of Parliament for Wirral West
- Incumbent
- Assumed office 4 July 2024
- Preceded by: Margaret Greenwood
- Majority: 9,998 (20.0%)

Personal details
- Born: 1987 or 1988 (age 38–39)
- Party: Labour
- Education: Liverpool John Moores University

Matthew John Patrick is a British Labour Party politician who has been the Member of Parliament (MP) for Wirral West since 2024, and was Parliamentary Under-Secretary of State for Northern Ireland between September 2025 and July 2026.

== Early life and education ==
He was born and brought up in Birkenhead, Merseyside, England. Patrick's parents worked in primary and secondary education. He attended Liverpool John Moores University.

== Political career ==
Patrick joined the Labour party in 2010. He was a Labour member of Wirral Council from 2013 to 2018 and is considered to be on the Labour Party's centrist wing. His 2013 election in a ward in Upton, Merseyside came with a 4.5% swing to Labour. Patrick has worked for the Financial Ombudsman Service; after leaving Wirral council in 2018 he worked in financial regulation in London. Immediately prior to taking office, Patrick worked as a Senior Communications Manager for Pay.UK, an operator and standards body for inter-bank financial transactions.

Patrick put himself forward as the Labour candidate for Wirral West in 2023. The selection process was controversial, with several members resigning from posts because of the candidate choices on the four-person shortlist. In March 2024, before the election was called but after his selection as candidate, Patrick went on a fully-funded four-day visit to Israel funded by Labour Friends of Israel. The purpose of the visit was for education and to meet with important political figures. In the 2024 general election, he was elected Member of Parliament (MP) for Wirral West with 23,156 votes (46.4%) and a majority of 9,998 over the second place Conservative candidate.

In November 2024, Patrick was appointed as a Parliamentary Private Secretary in the departments for Culture, Media and Sport (DCMS) and Science, Innovation and Technology (DSIT).

In September 2025, Patrick was appointed as a Parliamentary Under-Secretary of State in the Northern Ireland Office as part of Prime Minister Keir Starmer's reshuffle.

== Personal life ==
He is Jewish, and swore an oath to Charles III on the Torah during the State Opening of Parliament. He supports West Bromwich Albion F.C.
