= Edward Cotton-Jodrell =

British Army officer and Conservative politician

Sir Edward Thomas Davenant Cotton Jodrell KCB DL
- Cotton-Jodrell in 1895.
- Born: Edward Thomas Davenant Cotton; 29 June 1847; Rugby
- Died: 13 October 1917 (aged 70)
- Education: Rugby School, Marlborough College and the Royal Military Academy, Woolwich
- Occupations: British Army Officer, Member of Parliament
- Successor: Joseph Hoult
- Political party: Conservative
- Parents: Rt. Rev. George Edward Lynch Cotton (father); Sophia Anne Tomkinson (mother)

Sir Edward Thomas Davenant Cotton-Jodrell KCB DL (29 June 1847 – 13 October 1917), known until 1890 as Edward Thomas Davenant Cotton, was a British Army officer and Conservative politician who sat in the House of Commons from 1885 to 1900.

== Early life and education ==
Cotton-Jodrell was the son of Rt. Rev. George Edward Lynch Cotton and his wife Sophia Ann Tomkinson and baptised with the name of Edward Thomas Davenant Cotton. His father was a master at Rugby School and, from 1852, headmaster of Marlborough College until appointed Bishop of Calcutta in 1858. The young Edward Cotton was consequently educated at Rugby and Marlborough College before entering the Royal Military Academy, Woolwich.

== Military career ==
On completing his military training he was promoted lieutenant on 15 July 1868. He joined the Royal Artillery and became captain on 1 August 1879. After having commenced his political career, he assumed command of the volunteer territorial Cheshire (Railway Battalion) of the Royal Engineers with the rank of lieutenant colonel in 1888, and was granted the honorary rank of colonel ten years later. He was on the Headquarters Staff of the War Office from 1906 to 1912 and was awarded the Territorial Decoration in 1909.

== Political and public career ==
Cotton was elected as Conservative Member of Parliament (MP) for Wirral at the 1885 general election and held the seat until he stood down at the 1900 general election. Cotton-Jodrell was J.P. for Cheshire, and was appointed Deputy Lieutenant of the county in 1901. He was invested as a Knight Commander of the Order of the Bath (K.C.B.) in 1902.

== Family, death and succession ==
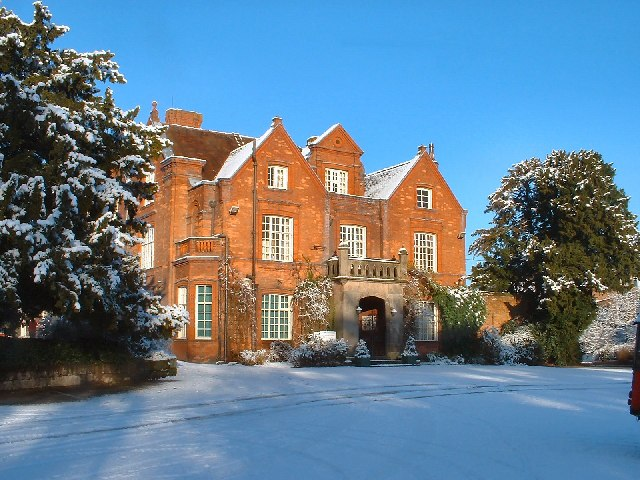
Reaseheath Hall, near Nantwich

On the death of his great-uncle Thomas Jodrell Phillips Jodrell, his maternal uncle Henry Richard Tomkinson made a deed of gift of the resulting inheritance in his favour. In accordance with a covenant of the will, on 10 July 1890, he assumed the surname and arms of Jodrell by Royal Licence and became known as Edward Thomas Davenant Cotton-Jodrell.

Cotton-Jodrell had residences in Cheshire in the Tomkinson family home at Reaseheath near Nantwich, but also at Yeardsley and at Shallcross. His London address was 13 Stratton Street, former abode of his great-uncle.

Cotton-Jodrell married Mary Rennell Coleridge, daughter of William Rennell Coleridge of Salston, Ottery St Mary, Devon, and Katherine Frances Barton, on 24 April 1878 and had two surviving daughters.

He died on 17 October 1917, at the age of 70 and was succeeded by his eldest daughter, Dorothy Lynch Ramsden who, with her husband Lieutenant-Colonel Henry Ramsden, assumed the surname and arms of Jodrell by Royal Licence on 15 March 1920. The Jodrell Trust Estates were subsequently sold by auction on 14 November 1923.

Parliament of the United Kingdom
New constituency before: West Cheshire	Member of Parliament for Wirral; 1885 – 1900	Succeeded by Joseph Hoult
