= Arthur Bulley =

Cotton broker and gardener (1861–1942)

- Born: January 10, 1861; New Brighton
- Died: May 3, 1942 (aged 81); Cheshire
- Known for: Ness Botanic Gardens

Arthur Kilpin Bulley (10 January 1861 – 3 May 1942) was a British cotton merchant and creator of the Ness Botanic Gardens. He stood for Parliament as a women's suffrage candidate in 1910.

== Personal life ==
Bulley was one of the 14 children of Samuel Marshall Bulley and Mary (née Raffles). He was born in New Brighton, Cheshire, in 1861.

He married Harriet Agnes Whishaw in 1890. They were both committed teetotallers and politically active. They had two children together, Agnes Lois Bulley (1901–1995) and Alfred Whishaw Bulley (born 1905). Bulley's sisters included Amy Bulley and Ella Sophia Armitage, who unusually had a university education.

== Career ==
After leaving school he joined his family's cotton trading business, often travelling overseas where he developed an interest in uncommon plants. Bulley purchased 60 acres of land near Ness in Cheshire in 1898, in which he built a house and a plant nursery, opening parts of the garden for free to villagers. Bulley commissioned plant collectors and botanists such as George Forrest, Augustine Henry, and Frank Kingdon-Ward to obtain plants from countries including South America, China, and Africa to place in his gardens. In 1903 Bulley opened a nursery, Bees Nursery (later Bees Ltd), at Ness where he sold plants grown from seeds originating in Europe and Asia.

In January 1910 Bulley stood as the Women's Suffrage candidate in Rossendale. He received the fewest votes but stated his aim was not to win but to ensure visibility of the suffrage cause. He stood unsuccessfully for Liverpool City Council several times, first as a Socialist Party of Great Britain candidate then as a Labour Party candidate.

Bulley campaigned in 1921 to open an Alpine garden on Snowdon, receiving criticism from those concerned about introducing foreign plants to the mountain, leading to his abandonment of the plan soon after. The species Primula bulleyana and the orchid genus Bulleya Schlechter are named after Bulley.
