= Ness Botanic Gardens =

Botanic garden owned by University of Liverpool, on the Wirral Peninsula, England

Coordinates: 53.2724°N 3.0430°W

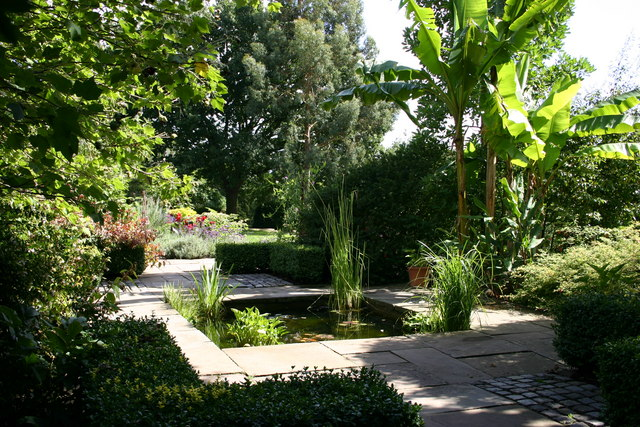
An area of Ness Botanic Gardens in 2006

Ness Botanic Gardens are at Ness, Cheshire in the Wirral Peninsula. This is near the cities of Liverpool and Chester and close to the English-Welsh border. They occupy a site of 64 acres overlooking the Dee Estuary. The Ness Botanic Gardens were created by Arthur Kilpin Bulley (1861–1942), a wealthy cotton trader from Liverpool and benefited from collections by many plant hunters including George Forrest and Frank Kingdon-Ward.

Arthur Bulley began to create the garden in 1898. In 1948, a few years after his death, his daughter Lois Bulley gave the garden to the University of Liverpool, under a Conditional Trust. One condition of the Trust is that the gardens must remain open to the public. They are on the National Register of Historic Parks and Gardens and are Grade II. The gardens have many fine specimen trees and flowers. Magnolias, rhododendron, witch-hazels and camellias are some of the notable plant-hunted species in the garden. Snowdrop walks are conducted during the flowering season.

== See also ==
- List of parks and open spaces in Cheshire
