= Stephen Hesford =

British politician and barrister

Member of Parliament for Wirral West
- In office 1 May 1997 – 12 April 2010
- Preceded by: David Hunt
- Succeeded by: Esther McVey

Personal details
- Born: 27 May 1957 (age 69) Lowton St Mary's, England
- Party: Labour
- Spouse: Elizabeth Henshall (m. 1984)
- Children: 2
- Education: University of Bradford; University of Westminster

Stephen Hesford (born 27 May 1957) is a British Labour politician and barrister who served as the member of parliament (MP) for Wirral West from 1997 to 2010.

== Early life ==
Born in Lowton St Mary's, near Leigh, Lancashire, Hesford was educated at Urmston Grammar School. In 1978, he received a BSc in Social Science from the University of Bradford, and earned an LLM at the Polytechnic of Central London in 1980.

Hesford was called to the bar at Gray's Inn in 1981 and worked as a criminal law barrister in Altrincham, Cheshire until his election to Parliament.

== Parliamentary career ==
Hesford was an assistant to Joan Lestor, Labour MP for Eccles, in 1992, and unsuccessfully contested South Suffolk in the general election of the same year.

He was elected to the House of Commons at the 1997 General Election for Wirral West, defeating former Cabinet minister David Hunt with a 13.8% swing. Making his maiden speech on 3 July 1997, Hesford recalled a constituency predecessor and former House Speaker Selwyn Lloyd.

Hesford served on the Northern Ireland Affairs Committee from 1998 to 2000, and the Health and Social Care Committee from 1999 to 2001 and again from 2007 to 2010. He was appointed Parliamentary Private Secretary (PPS) to Valerie Amos, Leader of the House of Lords, after the 2005 General Election until September 2006. Serving as PPS to Vera Baird, Solicitor General, he resigned in September 2009 in protest over Baroness Scotland remaining as Attorney General after breaking employment laws.

On 23 January 2010, Hesford announced that he would not stand at the 2010 general election for "family reasons".

== Personal life ==
Hesford married Elizabeth Anne Henshall in 1984, with whom he has two sons. He is a member of the Fabian Society and the Lancashire County Cricket Club.

Since leaving Parliament, he has become a guest lecturer at the University of Chester.

Parliament of the United Kingdom
Preceded by David Hunt	Member of Parliament for Wirral West; 1997 – 2010	Succeeded by Esther McVey
