= David Hunt, Baron Hunt of Wirral =

British politician (born 1942)

The Right Honourable The Lord Hunt of Wirral MBE PC
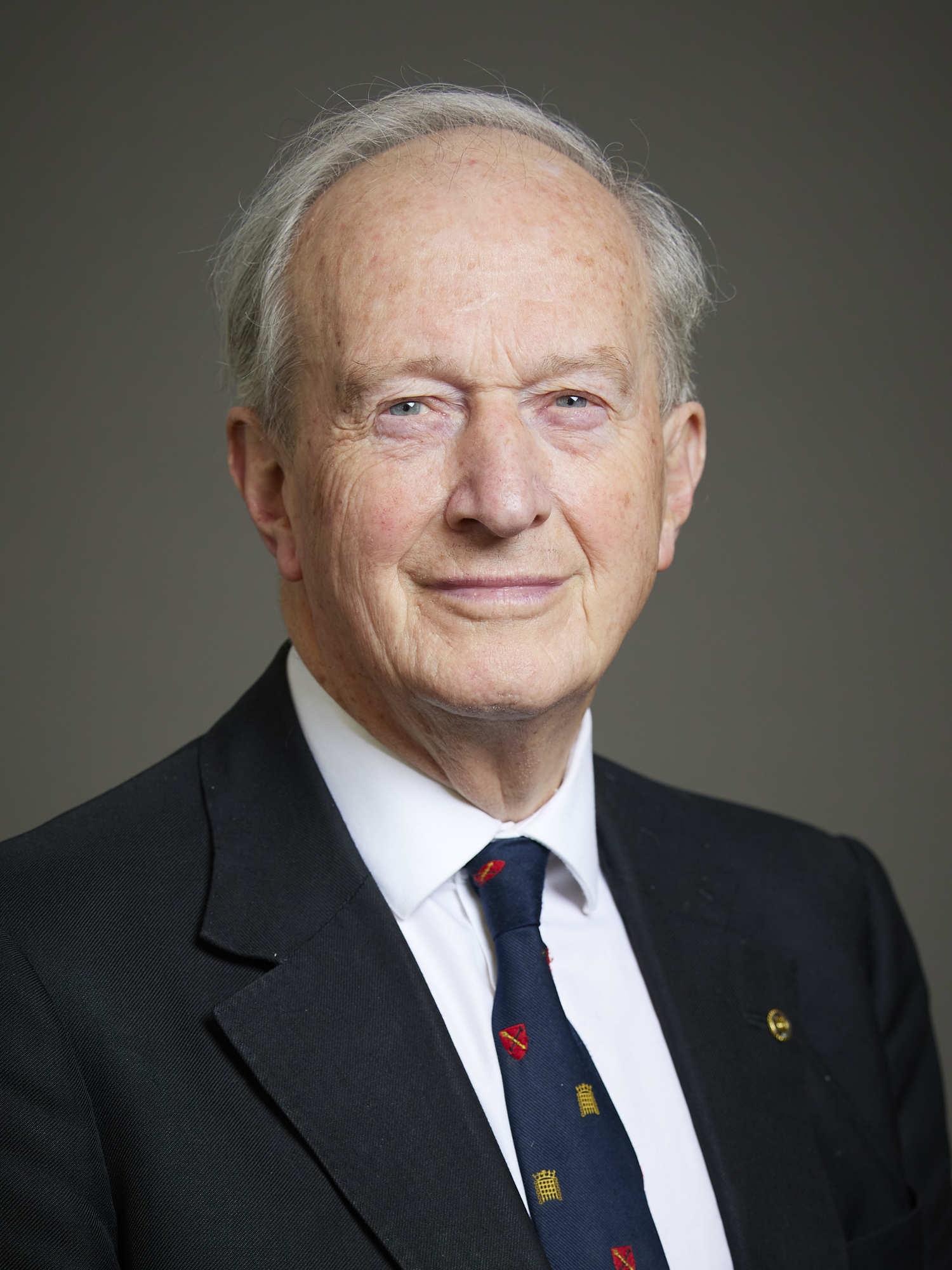
- Official portrait, 2023

Shadow Minister for Business, Innovation, Science and Trade (Note: Business, Enterprise and Regulatory Reform from October 2008 to June 2009, Business, Innovation and Skills June 2009 to May 2010, Business and Trade January 2025 to July 2026)
- Incumbent
- Assumed office 1 January 2025
- Leader: Kemi Badenoch
- In office 7 October 2008 – 6 May 2010
- Leader: David Cameron

Secretary of State for Wales
- Acting; 26 June 1995 – 5 July 1995
- Prime Minister: John Major
- Preceded by: John Redwood
- Succeeded by: William Hague
- In office 4 May 1990 – 27 May 1993
- Prime Minister: Margaret Thatcher; John Major
- Preceded by: Peter Walker
- Succeeded by: John Redwood

Chancellor of the Duchy of Lancaster
- In office 20 July 1994 – 5 July 1995
- Prime Minister: John Major
- Preceded by: William Waldegrave
- Succeeded by: Roger Freeman

Secretary of State for Employment
- In office 27 May 1993 – 20 July 1994
- Prime Minister: John Major
- Preceded by: Gillian Shephard
- Succeeded by: Michael Portillo

Minister of State for Local Government
- In office 25 July 1989 – 4 May 1990
- Prime Minister: Margaret Thatcher
- Preceded by: John Gummer
- Succeeded by: Michael Portillo

Deputy Chief Whip Treasurer of the Household
- In office 15 June 1987 – 25 July 1989
- Prime Minister: Margaret Thatcher
- Preceded by: John Cope
- Succeeded by: Tristan Garel-Jones

Member of the House of Lords
- Lord Temporal
- Life peerage 20 October 1997

Member of Parliament for Wirral West Wirral (1976–83)
- In office 11 March 1976 – 8 April 1997
- Preceded by: Selwyn Lloyd
- Succeeded by: Stephen Hesford

Personal details
- Born: David James Fletcher Hunt; 21 May 1942 (age 84) Glyn Ceiriog, Wales
- Party: Conservative
- Relations: Grandchild - Charlie Smith

David James Fletcher Hunt, Baron Hunt of Wirral, MBE, PC (born 21 May 1942) is a British Conservative politician who served as a member of the Cabinet during the Thatcher and Major ministries, and was appointed to the Privy Council in 1990.

== Education ==
Hunt was educated at Liverpool College, an independent school for boys (now co-educational), in Liverpool, at the time in Lancashire (and now in Merseyside), followed by the University of Bristol, where he studied Law. In 1965, representing the university, he won The Observer Mace debating competition, speaking with Bob Marshall-Andrews (who would also go on to become an MP, for Labour). In 1995, the competition was renamed the John Smith Memorial Mace, and is now run by the English-Speaking Union.

== Early life ==
Born in Glyn Ceiriog in 1942, the son of former Royal Naval Reserves Officer Alan N. Hunt OBE and Jessie E. E. Northrop, David Hunt was the middle child of three, with two sisters. Growing up, David was an active member of the Young Conservatives where he was inspired into running for political office for the Conservative Party.

== Parliamentary career ==
Hunt unsuccessfully contested Bristol South in 1970. In the 1973 Birthday Honours, he was appointed to the Order of the British Empire as a Member (MBE) for 'political services in the West of England'. He then unsuccessfully contested Kingswood in 1974. Hunt became the Member of Parliament for Wirral after winning a by-election in 1976. The seat was broken up and Hunt became Member of Parliament for the new Wirral West constituency in 1983.

== In Government ==
In Government he served as a whip and junior minister under Margaret Thatcher, who made him Secretary of State for Wales in 1990, shortly before her resignation later that year. In the 1990 Conservative leadership election he is widely believed to have been the only member of the Cabinet to vote for Michael Heseltine on the first ballot. He remained at the Welsh Office until 1993, then served as Secretary of State for Employment from 1993 to 1994 and as Chancellor of the Duchy of Lancaster from 1994 to 1995. In the Cabinet reshuffle of 1995, John Major offered Hunt the position of Health Secretary. He declined the offer and Major gave that position to Stephen Dorrell. He briefly returned to the Welsh Office, whilst remaining Chancellor of the Duchy of Lancaster, for two weeks during the leadership election in mid-1995 as acting Secretary of State for Wales after the incumbent, John Redwood, stepped down to be a candidate.

Hunt lost his seat in the Labour landslide at the 1997 general election.

== Peerage ==
In the 1997 Prime Minister's Resignation Honours, he was raised to the peerage as Baron Hunt of Wirral of Wirral in the county of Merseyside. Lord Hunt was senior partner at the national law firm Beachcroft Wansbroughs (now DAC Beachcroft) between 1996 and 2005. He is now chairman of the firm's financial services division and is regarded as a major figure in the world of insurance and financial services. On certain Bills he used to occasionally step back up to the opposition front bench in the House of Lords, on an ad hoc basis. On 7 October 2008, Conservative leader David Cameron formally appointed him to the front bench to shadow Peter Mandelson in the House of Lords on Department for Business, Enterprise and Regulatory Reform matters.

Hunt was awarded an honorary Doctor of Laws degree by the University of Bristol on 20 February 2008. He is vice-president of the Holocaust Educational Trust. He became chairman of the Press Complaints Commission on 17 October 2011. Two months later, he recommended closing the PCC and replacing it with an alternative independent press regulator.

Hunt was appointed Shadow Minister for Business and Trade under Kemi Badenoch in 2025.

== Arms ==
Coat of arms of David Hunt, Baron Hunt of Wirral
Crest Statant upon a portcullis chained Or an oyster catcher wings elevated and addorsed Proper holding in its beak by the strings Gules a bugle horn or garnished Gules. Escutcheon Azure a stag's head caboshed Argent on a chief Or a rose Gules barbed and seeded Proper between two ostrich feathers Sable. Supporters Dexter a lion Azure resting the dexter forepaw on an anchor Or, sinister a dragon Azure resting the sinister foreclaws on a pickaxe head downwards Or. Motto Pro Deo Et Civitate (For God And State)

== Notes ==
Parliament of the United Kingdom
Preceded by Selwyn Lloyd	Member of Parliament for Wirral; 1976–1983	Constituency abolished
New constituency	Member of Parliament for Wirral West; 1983–1997	Succeeded by Stephen Hesford
Political offices
Preceded by John Cope	Treasurer of the Household; 1987–1989	Succeeded by Tristan Garel-Jones
Preceded by Peter Walker	Secretary of State for Wales; 1990–1993	Succeeded by John Redwood
Preceded by Gillian Shephard	Secretary of State for Employment; 1993–1994	Succeeded by Michael Portillo
Preceded by William Waldegrave	Chancellor of the Duchy of Lancaster; 1994–1995	Succeeded by Roger Freeman
Preceded by John Redwood	Secretary of State for Wales; 1995	Succeeded by William Hague
Party political offices
Preceded by John Cope	Conservative Deputy Chief Whip in the House of Commons; 1987–1989	Succeeded by Tristan Garel-Jones
Media offices
Preceded by Peta Buscombe	Chair of the Press Complaints Commission; 2011–present	Incumbent
Orders of precedence in the United Kingdom
Preceded by The Lord Hunt of Kings Heath	Gentlemen; Baron Hunt of Wirral	Followed by The Lord Razzall
