= Alan Graham (British politician) =

Captain Alan Crosland Graham (2 August 1896 – 10 May 1964) was a British Conservative politician.

He was the son of Sir Crosland Graham of Clwyd Hall, Ruthin, Denbighshire, a Liverpool businessman. He was educated at Rugby School. In 1915, he was commissioned as an officer in the Queen's Own Cameron Highlanders, serving in France and north Russia during the First World War.

Following the war he attended Trinity College, Oxford, where he studied history. He became involved in Conservative politics, being appointed as private political secretary to Arthur Balfour from 1925 to 1929. He unsuccessfully stood for election in 1929 in Denbigh, and 1931 in Darwen.

He was private secretary to the first Viscount Hailsham from 1932 to 1935. In the latter year he was elected as Member of Parliament (MP) for Wirral. He was a member of the Anglo-Polish Parliamentary Committee, and published a book entitled Does Poland matter to Britain? An indictment of political isolationism, a cry for justice and for Christianity in action.

He retired as member of parliament at the next general election in 1945.

== Family ==
He was married twice. His first marriage was to Marion du Plessis of Cape Town with whom he had two daughters. They were divorced in 1948, and in 1953 he married Marie Antoinette Louise Pavluc. The second marriage produced a son and daughter.

Parliament of the United Kingdom
Preceded by George Christopher Clayton	Member of Parliament for Wirral; 1935–1945	Succeeded by Selwyn Lloyd
