= Joseph Hoult =

British politician

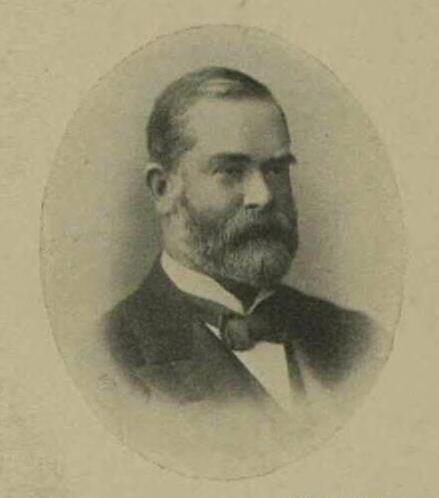
- Born: 18 August 1847
- Died: 18 October 1917 (aged 70)
- Occupation: Politician
- Position held: member of the 27th Parliament of the United Kingdom (1900–1906)

Joseph Hoult (18 August 1847 – 18 October 1917) was a British ship-owner from Liverpool. He was also a Conservative Party politician who sat in the House of Commons from 1900 to 1906.

== Early life ==
Hoult was the son of the John Hoult and his wife Alice (née Welsby). He was brought up in the Stanley area of Liverpool and educated privately, before being apprenticed to a shipbroking business in Liverpool on a salary of £60 per year. When he was 21 he set up his own shipbroking business, and later became an owner of steamships through his company, Joseph Hoult & Co, in Castle Street, Liverpool.

== Career ==
=== Business ===
His business prospered, and he became a member of Liverpool City Council and a Justice of the Peace. In 1872 he married Julia Anne Murray, from Edinburgh.

In 1896 Hoult was appointed by the Board of Trade committee to inquire into the manning of merchant ships. The inquiry had been prompted by the shipwreck in 1894 of the under-manned vessel Port Yarrock, which foundered in Brandon Bay with the loss of 20 lives. Its remit was to advise whether the law needed to be changed to allow the detention of undermanned ships. In their report later that year, the majority of the committee recommended legal controls, but Hoult and the other ship-owners on the committee submitted a minority report which opposed legal control. They claimed that any such Law would disadvantage British ships against their foreign competitors, and would be too rigid as improvements in propulsion and navigation technology reduced the necessary levels.

In 1897 Holt was elected as a member of the council of the British Empire League. In December of that year, he told the annual dinner of the Liverpool Shipbrokers' Benevolent Society that British business had been hampered by too much regulation, and called for the abolition of light dues.

=== Parliament ===
At the 1900 general election, Hoult was elected as the Member of Parliament (MP) for Wirral division of Cheshire. The seat had been held by the Conservatives since its creation in 1885, and Hoult's predecessor Edward Cotton-Jodrell had been returned unopposed in 1886 and 1895. However, Hoult's majority of 1,005 votes (9% of the total) was less than a third of that won by his predecessor in 1892; in a growing electorate, the number of Conservative votes had remained static while the Liberal vote grew. At the next election, in 1906, Hoult was defeated by the Liberal candidate William Lever (later Viscount Leverhulme). He did not stand for Parliament again, although his name was mentioned as a possible candidate in the Liverpool Kirkdale by-election in 1907.

=== After Parliament ===
In May 1913, Hoult was one of a group of British ship-owners who established a mutual form of war insurance for ships. The Liverpool and London war Risks Association (Limited) covered the risks of British shipowners so long as Britain was neutral in any conflict, and the insured ships did not breach that neutrality.

In the same month he contributed £1,000 towards the establishment of a Liverpool Flying Corps, the total cost of which was estimated at £40,000 for equipment alone. However, the project was abandoned in June, when the executive committee of the project reported that neither the War Office nor the Admiralty would guarantee the local facilities which would be needed. The Secretary of State for War, Col. J. E. B. Seely was slow to respond to the proposal, but visited Liverpool in July to announce that any such venture should be organised centrally.

On 8 March 1915, as the German U-boat Campaign moved into a phase of unrestricted attacks on the merchant shipping of Britain and her allies, The Times newspaper published a letter from Hoult commending one of his sea captains who had vowed that he would try to ram and sink any U-boats he encountered. He noted that two British captains had already claimed to have sunk one U-boat each, and offered a reward of £500 apiece for the next 4 U-boats sunk by British merchant ships or trawlers. Others wrote to The Times offering to supplement Hoult's offer. On 10 March, a further £105 was pledged. On 12 March, the idea was criticised by the ship-owner Lord Inverclyde, who pointed out that ramming a U-boat endangered the ship and invalidated its insurance. The offer was further increased on the same day by an offer of £100 per U-boat from the French owners of Perrier mineral water, and by 24 March the total had reached £2,000 per submarine.

In January 1917 it was reported that Hoult had invested £250,000 in War Loans.

Hoult died aged 70, on 18 October 1917. He was found dead in his bed at his county home in Bowscar, near Penrith.

Parliament of the United Kingdom
Preceded by Edward Cotton-Jodrell	Member of Parliament for Chelsea; 1886–1906	Succeeded by William Lever
