= 1976 Wirral by-election =

UK parliamentary by-election

- 11 March 1976

Constituency of Wirral
- Turnout: 46.44% (▲27.24%)
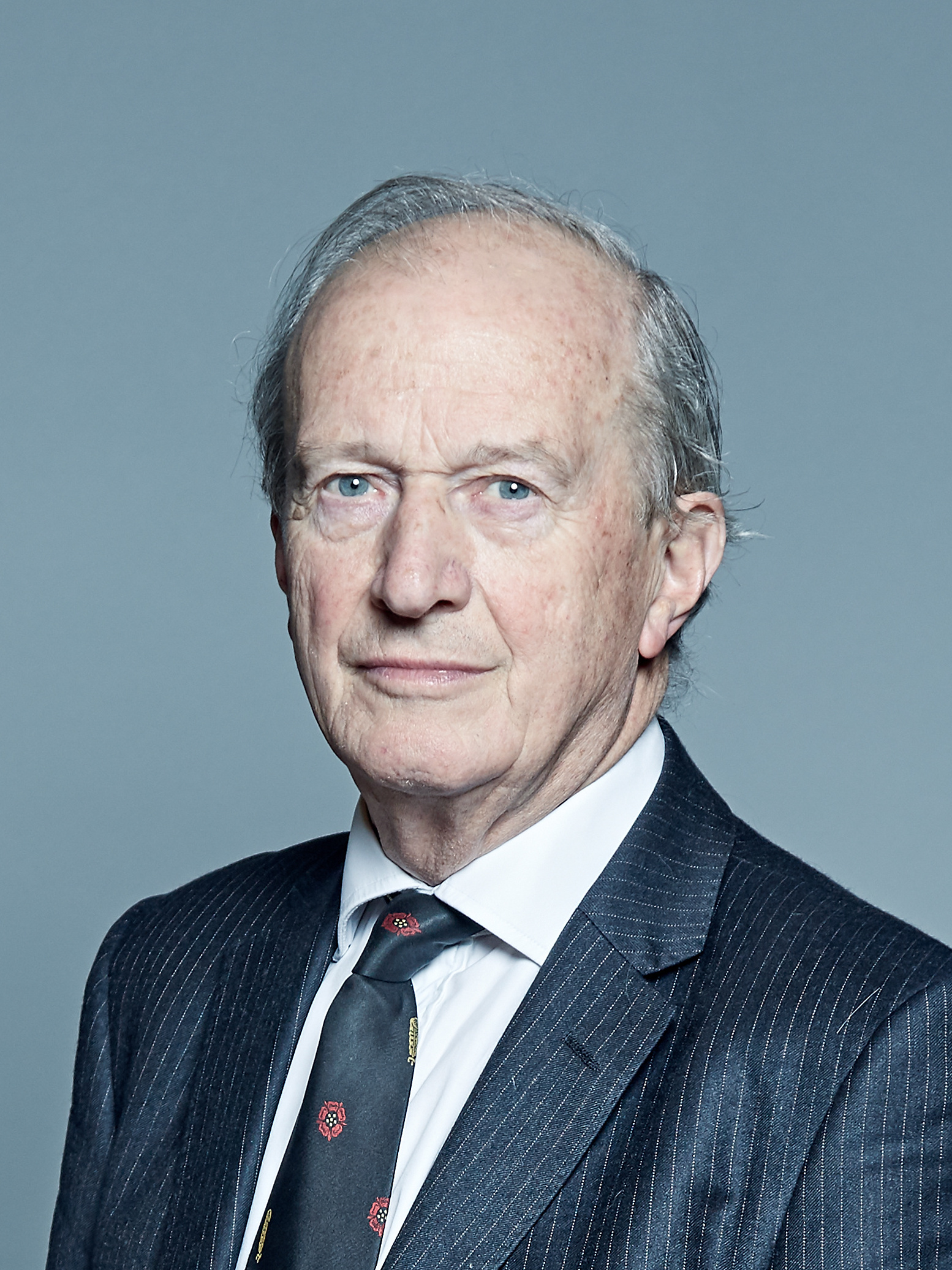

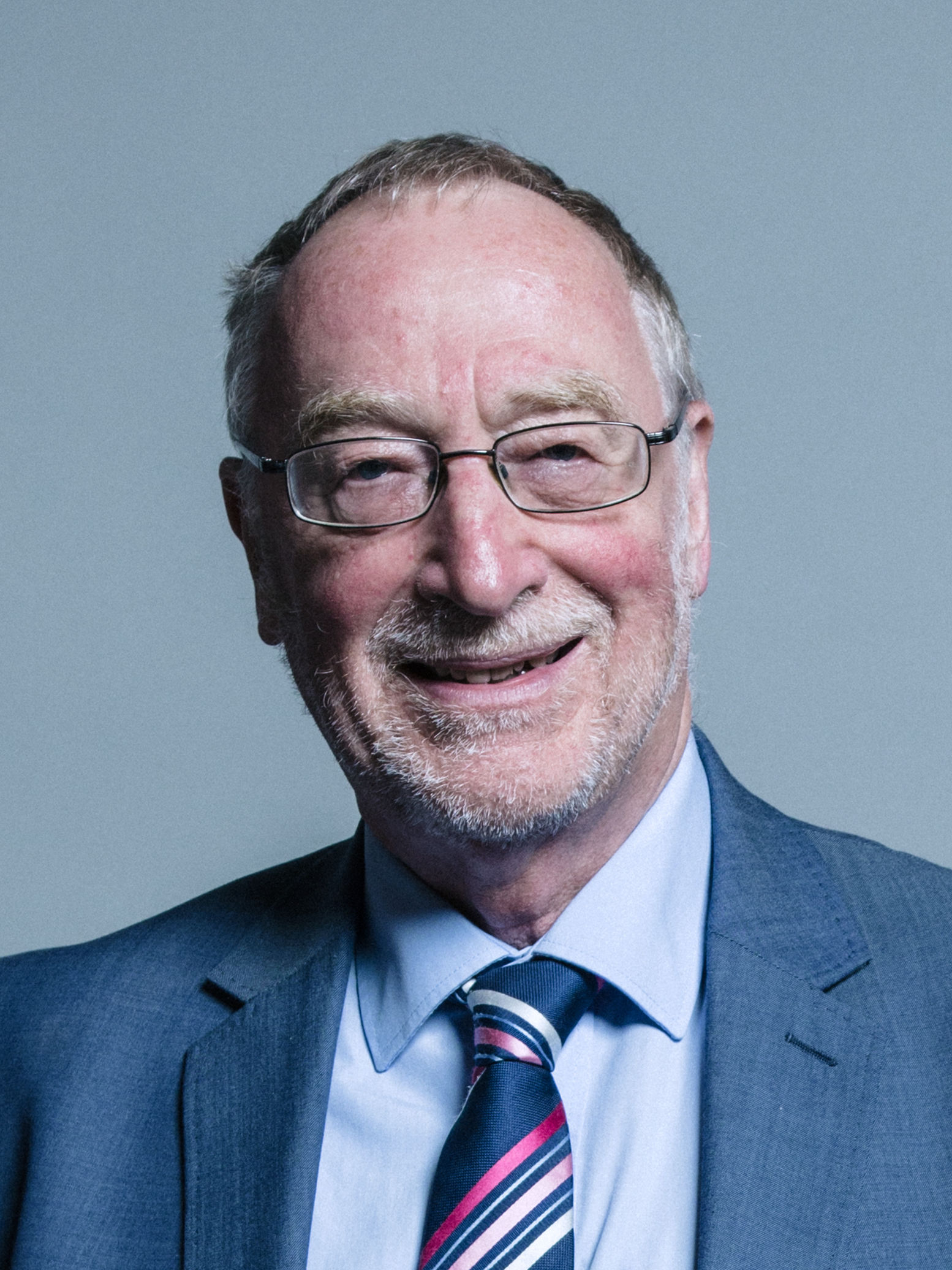
	First party	Second party	Third party
			Lib
Candidate	David Hunt	Adrian Bailey	Michael Gayford
Party	Conservative	Labour	Liberal
Popular vote	34,675	10,562	5,914
Percentage	66.78%	20.34%	11.39%
Swing	▲15.97%	▼11.26%	▼6.21%
MP before election
Selwyn Lloyd
Speaker
Elected MP
David Hunt
Conservative

The 1976 Wirral by-election of 11 March 1976 was held after Selwyn Lloyd, who had been elected as a Conservative Member of Parliament (MP) but who was serving as Speaker of the House of Commons, retired. The Conservatives regained the seat in the by-election.

== Result ==
Wirral by-Election, 1976
Party	Candidate	Votes	%	±%
Conservative	David Hunt	34,675	66.78	+15.97
Labour	Adrian Bailey	10,562	20.34	−11.26
Liberal	Michael Gayford	5,914	11.39	−6.21
English National	Frank Hansford-Miller	466	0.90	New
Ind. Conservative	Hilary Miller	307	0.59	New
Majority		24,412	46.44	+27.24
Turnout		51,924		
Conservative gain from Speaker		Swing		
