= Lois Bulley =

British county councillor, philanthropist and political activist

Agnes Lois Bulley
- Born: 2 December 1901; Ness, Cheshire, England
- Died: 27 December 1995 (aged 94); Tarvin, Cheshire, England

Agnes Lois Bulley (1901–1995) was a British county councillor, philanthropist and political activist from Cheshire, England.

== Personal life ==
Preferring to be called Lois, she was the daughter of Harriet Agnes (née Whishaw) and Arthur Kilpin Bulley. Her father had become wealthy within his family's cotton brokerage business and later became a keen plant collector and started Bees Ltd seed company.

She was born on 2 December 1901 at Mickwell Brow, a house built for her father near the village of Ness near the market town of Neston on the Wirral Peninsula, Cheshire. She had a brother Alfred Whishaw Bulley (born 1905). They were brought up as agnostics, despite the Congregationalist and Anglican backgrounds of their parents.

After initially being educated at home by French and German governesses, she was sent to the co-educational Bedales School, Hampshire and then trained as a nurse and midwife at Queen Mary Maternity Hospital in Hampstead, qualifying in 1925. She worked initially in the East End of London.

Although she was born into wealth, she became committed to the socialist principles of her parents and devoted much of her life to philanthropy and political activity through local government. She was an advocate for women's participation in civil society and inclusion at senior levels in business.

She returned to Ness and became a member of the management committee of Neston and Parkgate Housing Society that aimed to replace slum housing with new, better quality, homes. She was also a member of Wirral Footpaths and Open Spaces Preservation Society. Her father died in 1942.

In 1948, she was appointed to the Liverpool Regional Hospital Board and chaired the mental services committee, and then the board itself until 1972. In the same year she bought her brother's share of the family home and donated it and an endowment of £75,000 to the University of Liverpool which has become Ness Botanic Gardens. This included provision for her mother to live in the house for the rest of her life, and that the gardens would be open to the public. She herself lived at Birch Hey in Ness Holt, sharing it with Ellen Norman.

In 1954, she became a member of the Quakers. In 1956, after her mother's death, she set up a charitable trust (Motormart Charitable Trust) to benefit people in East Africa in part because some of her family's wealth originated from Africa, and also because there were several Quaker mission centres in the region. It helped fund schools and colleges, including one that has now become the Technical University of Kenya. It also supported other projects including supporting small businesses. In 1973 she decided that the trust should be wound up. There is still a Lois Bulley Scholarship Fund to support Kenyan women to attend university.

She was a life-long teetotaller.

In later life she was able to enjoy the theatres, concerts and galleries and particularly ballet in London where she, and a friend Mrs Nancy Kershaw, warden of the Heswall Meeting House, had a small flat. They also travelled around the UK, France, Spain and Germany in a campervan. After living in Chester they finally moved to Tarvin in Cheshire where Mrs Kershaw had a bungalow. She died there on 27 December 1995 at the age of 94.

== Political career ==
She joined the Labour Party in 1930.

In 1933, she stood as Little Neston candidate in the Neston Urban District Council Election for the one available seat, and came second. However, she was elected in 1934 in the Cheshire County Council elections as a Labour councillor for the Ellesmere Port and Neston division. The proposals on which she stood included improved access to health care at the local Clatterbridge Hospital, welfare benefits through employing local men to construct roads and bridges and also disregarding war pensions and free school meals in the Means Test for benefits. She also advocated change in aspects of education, namely increasing the number of free secondary school places and providing milk and school meals. She was also successful in being elected as Little Neston councillor for the Neston Urban District Council in 1934. Although she lost both the district and county council seats in 1937, she returned to Cheshire County Council for the seat of Bebington, including New Ferry, in 1939. Her council roles included acting as vice-chair and Hon Secretary for the Committee of Chester and District Blind Welfare Society. In 1945 she was co-opted onto the housing committee of Neston Urban District Council. She was elected to the Neston East Ward of Neston Urban Council from 1957 - 1960. Her election allowed the Labour Party to have a majority in the council for the first time.

In 1935 she stood as the Labour candidate for the parliamentary seat of City of Chester, coming third behind the Conservative and Liberal candidates. She supported the Labour Party policies of nationalising the coal industry, raising the school leaving age to 15 and paying pensions from the age of 60. She joined the Communist Party in 1936 because the Labour Party and British government had policies of non-intervention in the Spanish Civil War. In 1945 she stood as the Labour candidate for the parliamentary seat of Wirral but came second.

== Legacy ==
Her family home and gardens, donated to the University of Liverpool as Ness Botanic Gardens continues to be used for public recreation as well as horticultural education and scientific research.
