= The Future of Iraq =

2004 non-fiction book

The Future of Iraq: Dictatorship, Democracy or Division?
- Author: Liam Anderson; Gareth Stansfield
- Language: English
- Genre: Nonfiction
- Publisher: Palgrave Macmillan
- Publication date: 2004
- ISBN: 978-1-403-96354-3

The Future of Iraq: Dictatorship, Democracy or Division? is an academic book by Liam Anderson and Gareth Stansfield, published by Palgrave in 2004. The authors argue that following the 2003 invasion of Iraq, Western efforts to construct a new nation state with the old Iraqi boundaries have failed and that partition is the best solution.

== Authors ==
A rough 2011 map of Iraq's ethnoreligious groups, with Shias in red (east), Sunnis in green (west), and Kurds in yellow (northeast)

Liam Anderson is a professor in the School of Public and International Affairs at Wright State University. Gareth Stansfield is a professor of Middle East Politics at the University of Exeter.

== Criticism ==
Roger Hardy praised the book's sections on the "legacy of British rule and the corrosive effects of the institutionalized violence practised by Saddam Hussein" on Iraq, but criticized the authors for having a perceived dogmatic and compartmentalized view of the three major groups of Iraq—Sunnis, Shias, and Kurds—and of being so partial to the Kurds that they overrated the degree of democracy in the Kurdish areas of Iraq.

Abbas Kadhim of the Middle East Institute reviewed the book for the International Journal of Middle East Studies, and was negative; he found that the notion advanced in the book (and shared by other scholars) that Iraq was always already an "artificial state" to be defective, and claims there are two major flaws in that argument: the Iraqi territory does not have clear boundaries between ethnic groups, and the claim that only violent force can hold the country together bypasses political options.
