= Selwyn Lloyd =

British politician (1904–1978)

The Right Honourable The Lord Selwyn-Lloyd CH CBE TD PC QC DL
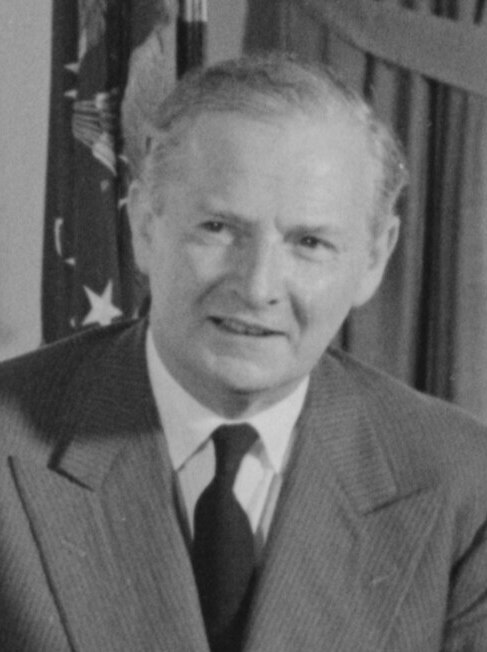
- Lloyd in 1959

Speaker of the House of Commons of the United Kingdom
- In office 12 January 1971 – 3 February 1976
- Monarch: Elizabeth II
- Prime Minister: Edward Heath; Harold Wilson
- Preceded by: Horace King
- Succeeded by: George Thomas

Shadow Leader of the House of Commons
- In office 16 October 1964 – 4 August 1965
- Leader: Alec Douglas-Home
- Preceded by: Herbert Bowden
- Succeeded by: Fred Peart

Leader of the House of Commons Lord Keeper of the Privy Seal
- In office 18 October 1963 – 16 October 1964
- Prime Minister: Alec Douglas-Home
- Preceded by: Iain Macleod
- Succeeded by: The Earl of Longford

Chancellor of the Exchequer
- In office 27 July 1960 – 13 July 1962
- Prime Minister: Harold Macmillan
- Preceded by: Derick Heathcoat Amory
- Succeeded by: Reginald Maudling

Foreign Secretary
- In office 22 December 1955 – 27 July 1960
- Prime Minister: Anthony Eden; Harold Macmillan
- Preceded by: Harold Macmillan
- Succeeded by: Alec Douglas-Home

Minister of Defence
- In office 7 April 1955 – 20 December 1955
- Prime Minister: Anthony Eden
- Preceded by: Harold Macmillan
- Succeeded by: Walter Monckton

Minister of Supply
- In office 18 October 1954 – 7 April 1955
- Prime Minister: Winston Churchill
- Preceded by: Duncan Sandys
- Succeeded by: Reginald Maudling

Member of the House of Lords Lord Temporal
- In office 8 March 1976 – 17 May 1978; Life peerage

Member of Parliament for Wirral
- In office 5 July 1945 – 11 February 1976
- Preceded by: Alan Crosland Graham
- Succeeded by: David Hunt

Personal details
- Born: John Selwyn Brooke Lloyd; 28 July 1904 West Kirby, Cheshire, England
- Died: 17 May 1978 (aged 73) Preston Crowmarsh, Oxfordshire, England
- Party: Liberal (before 1945); Conservative (1945–1971); None (after 1971)
- Spouse: Elizabeth Marshall (m. 1951; div. 1957) (died 2010)
- Children: 1
- Education: Fettes College; Magdalene College, Cambridge

Military service
- Allegiance: United Kingdom
- Branch/service: British Army
- Years of service: 1937–1955
- Rank: Colonel
- Unit: Royal Artillery
- Battles/wars: Second World War; Operation Overlord; Falaise Pocket; Allied advance from Paris to the Rhine; Operation Plunder
- Awards: Commander of the Order of the British Empire; Mentioned in despatches (2x); Territorial Decoration; Legion of Merit (Commander)

John Selwyn Brooke Selwyn-Lloyd, Baron Selwyn-Lloyd (28 July 1904 – 17 May 1978) was a British politician who served as Speaker of the House of Commons from 1971 to 1976, having previously held various ministerial positions under Prime Ministers Winston Churchill, Anthony Eden, Harold Macmillan and Alec Douglas-Home between 1954 and 1964. A member of the Conservative Party, (Note: From 1945 to 1971) Lloyd served as Foreign Secretary from 1955 to 1960 and as Chancellor of the Exchequer from 1960 to 1962. He was the Member of Parliament (MP) for Wirral from 1945 to 1976.

Born and raised in Cheshire, Lloyd was an active Liberal as a young man in the 1920s. In the following decade, he practised as a barrister and served on Hoylake Urban District Council, by which time he had become a Conservative Party sympathiser. During the Second World War he rose to be deputy chief of staff of Second Army, playing an important role in planning sea transport to the Normandy beachhead and reaching the acting rank of brigadier.

Elected to Parliament in 1945 as a Conservative, he held ministerial office from 1951, eventually rising to be Foreign Secretary under Prime Minister Anthony Eden from April 1955. His tenure coincided with the Suez Crisis, for which he at first attempted to negotiate a peaceful settlement, before reluctantly assisting with Eden's wish to negotiate collusion with France and Israel as a prelude to military action. He continued as foreign secretary under the premiership of Harold Macmillan until July 1960, when he was moved to the job of Chancellor of the Exchequer. In this job he set up the NEDC, but became an increasingly unpopular figure because of the contractionary measures which he felt compelled to take, including the "Pay Pause" of July 1961, culminating in the sensational Liberal victory at the Orpington by-election in March 1962. In July 1962 Macmillan dismissed him from the Cabinet, making him the highest-profile casualty in the reshuffle known as the "Night of the Long Knives".

He returned to office under Prime Minister Alec Douglas-Home as Leader of the House of Commons (1963–64), and was elected Speaker of the House of Commons from 1971 until his retirement in 1976.

== Early life ==
Lloyd was born on 28 July 1904 at Red Bank in West Kirby, Cheshire. His father, John Wesley Lloyd (1865–1954), was a dental surgeon and Methodist lay preacher of Welsh descent; his mother, Mary Rachel Warhurst (1872–1959), was distantly related to Field Marshal Sir John French. He had three sisters.

Lloyd was educated at the Leas School and as a boy was particularly interested in military history, to which he later attributed his successful military career. In 1918, aged thirteen, he won a scholarship to Fettes College. As a junior boy there, where he was nicknamed "Jezebel", after his initials JSBL, he became embroiled in a homosexual scandal, but was deemed to be the innocent party, escaping punishment, while three older boys were expelled.

== Cambridge ==
In October 1923, he went up, as a scholar, to Magdalene College, Cambridge, where A. C. Benson was Master. There he was a friend of the future Archbishop Michael Ramsey. Lloyd acquired the nickname "Peter" at this time. Lloyd played rugby and was disappointed not to get a Blue.

In October 1924, his sister Eileen sailed to India to marry and work as a doctor. She died there the following January, aged 25.

Lloyd was an active Liberal as a young man, and in March 1925 he entertained H. H. Asquith at Magdalene after a Liberal Party meeting at the Cambridge Guildhall. He became president of the Cambridge University Liberal Club. Lloyd was also an active debater in the Cambridge Union Society, where his sparring-partners included Rab Butler, Patrick Devlin, Hugh Foot, Alan King-Hamilton and Geoffrey Lloyd. Lloyd lost his scholarship in June 1925, after obtaining a Second in Classics. He then switched to study History, in which he also obtained a Second.

During the General Strike of May 1926, Lloyd, who earlier that year had begun eating dinners at Gray's Inn with a view to qualifying as a barrister, volunteered as a Special Constable. He later became critical of the Conservative Government's clampdown on trade unions, e.g. the Trades Disputes Act of 1927. The university authorities encouraged students who had worked for the government so close to their exams to extend their studies for an extra year, which meant that Lloyd was able to spend a very rare fifth year as an undergraduate. Lloyd George had become Liberal leader and was injecting money and ideas into the Liberal Party, and was keen to attract promising young candidates. Selwyn Lloyd was a frequent speaker for the Liberal Party from 1926 onwards. In 1926 he toyed, not entirely seriously, with the idea of joining the Labour Party.

In Michaelmas Term 1926, Lloyd and Devlin (then president of the Cambridge Union) persuaded Walter Citrine to join Lloyd in opposing the motion that "The power of trade unions has increased, is increasing and ought to be diminished" (an echo of Dunning's famous motion on the power of the Crown in 1780). They had invited the miners' leader A. J. Cook, to the consternation of the town authorities, but in the event he was unable to attend. Lloyd won the debate by 378 votes to 237 and was elected secretary for Lent Term 1927, putting him on track to be vice-president for Easter (summer) Term 1927, then president in Michaelmas 1927. He took office as president in June 1927. At his retiring debate in November 1927, Samuel Hoare and Rab Butler (then being selected as Tory candidate for Saffron Walden) spoke.

Lloyd finally graduated with a third-class in Part II of the Law Tripos in June 1928.

== Early career ==
=== Bar and local government ===
Lloyd was a Liberal Parliamentary candidate at Macclesfield in the 1929 general election, coming third. After this he concentrated on his legal career. He was called to the bar in 1930. As a barrister, he was an opponent of capital punishment and was not always deferential to the bench: when a judge suggested holding a special sitting on the morning of Good Friday, he withdrew his suggestion after Lloyd pointed out that the last judge to do so had been Pontius Pilate.

Like many young politicians, in 1930–1931 Lloyd was sympathetic to Oswald Mosley's New Party and was disappointed that it made so little headway. He declined to stand again for Macclesfield as a Liberal in 1931 over tariffs, and thought the rump National Liberal Party not worth joining. Lloyd voted Conservative for the first time at the 1931 election, although in that year he declined an invitation to join the Conservative Party candidates' list.

He joined Hoylake Urban District Council on 19 April 1932, as a councillor for Grange Ward. For three years he was chairman of the Estates Finance Committee, managing a budget in excess of £250,000, equivalent to £15,087,705 in 2025. At the age of 32 he became the youngest-ever chairman of the council. As chairman, in 1937, he was in charge of the local Coronation festivities, an event which he used to strengthen his links with the Territorial Army. He continued to serve on the council until 1940. In the early 1960s he was often mocked as "Mr Hoylake UDC", implying him to be a small-town lawyer and local councillor who had been promoted onto the national stage above his abilities.

Lloyd considered himself a Conservative from the mid-1930s, but did not formally join the Conservative Party until he was selected as a Parliamentary candidate in 1945; he later wrote that he would have taken a more active role in Conservative politics had it not been for the war.

=== Army service ===
==== Early Second World War service ====
Lloyd became a reserve officer in 1937. In January 1939 he helped to raise a second line unit of the Royal Horse Artillery in the North-West. He was commissioned as a regular second lieutenant on 27 June 1939, and by August, with war seeming ever more likely, he was an acting captain and acting brigade major to Brigadier Cherry, CRA (Commander, Royal Artillery) of the 55th (West Lancashire) Infantry Division, a first-line Territorial Army formation. His obituary in The Times later stated wrongly that he had begun the war as a private.

On the outbreak of war Lloyd's patron Brigadier Cherry sponsored him for the Staff College, Camberley. Many of those sent to the Staff College in 1939 were barristers, businessmen, school and university teachers thought likely to have an aptitude for staff work; Brian Horrocks was one of his instructors. Out of 110 officers in his intake, he was one of 22 passed as fit for immediate staff duty. He was appointed BMRA (Brigade major, Royal Artillery) to Brigadier Cherry, despite "not knowing anything about guns etc". By the spring of 1940 the 55th Division was on duty defending the Suffolk Coast against possible invasion.

In February 1941, by now an acting major, he was a General Staff Officer Grade 2 (GSO2) at the headquarters of Major General Charles Allfrey's 43rd (Wessex) Infantry Division, another first-line TA formation. The division was part of XII Corps, commanded by Lieutenant General Andrew Thorne, but he was replaced in April 1941 by Lieutenant General Bernard Montgomery, who soon noted Lloyd as a promising officer. Montgomery was promoted to command South-Eastern Command at Reigate (he soon renamed it "South Eastern Army") and on 18 December 1941 Lloyd was posted to join him. By 1942, Lloyd was a lieutenant colonel (GSO1) on the staff. He wanted to see fighting, and was disappointed not to be posted to Egypt with Montgomery when the latter took command of the Eighth Army in August 1942. Montgomery told him that temporary officers lacked the aptitude of regulars for fighting, but were often better at staff work. On 6 November, Lloyd was promoted to temporary lieutenant-colonel (war-substantive major).

==== Second Army ====
In the spring of 1943 Lloyd was posted to the staff of the Second Army, whose general officer commanding (GOC) was Lieutenant General Sir Kenneth Anderson, which was then being formed for participation in Operation Overlord. He was appointed an Officer of the Order of the British Empire (OBE) in June 1943. Between June and August 1943 Lloyd was sent on a fact-finding trip to Algiers, Malta and Sicily, to examine German beach defences and to learn lessons from the recent Operation Torch and Operation Husky landings, and on his return had to make presentations to senior officers. On 14 December 1943, he was promoted to acting colonel, and by February 1944 was deputy chief of staff of the Second Army, now commanded by Lieutenant General Sir Miles Dempsey. He later recalled that the work preparing for the Normandy landings was more intense than at any other time in his life. By March 1944 Montgomery, who, after commanding the Eighth Army in North Africa, Sicily and Italy, had returned to England in late December 1943 to take command of the 21st Army Group, knew him well enough to call him "Selwyn". Lloyd grew particularly close to Dempsey, with whom he crossed over to Normandy on D-Day and who remained a personal friend for the rest for their lives.

Lloyd's particular responsibility was preparation of the "loading tables", allocating priceless shipping space to men, weapons, equipment and other supplies. As a result of Lloyd's work, the deployment to the bridgehead went almost entirely according to plan. The only unforeseen problem was an outbreak of malaria caused by an infestation of mosquitoes around a flooded ditch in I Corps sector, for which Lloyd had to arrange the transfer of malaria vaccines from Burma.

In October 1944, although not yet a member of the Conservative Party, he accepted an invitation to apply for the Conservative candidacy for the Wirral, where the sitting MP was retiring. He was selected in preference to a VC bearing rival, who refused to pledge to live in the constituency; when asked Lloyd replied that he had "never lived anywhere else". In January 1945, he was unanimously adopted as the Conservative candidate whilst home on leave.

Lloyd was promoted to Commander of the Order of the British Empire (CBE) in February 1945 and was promoted to acting brigadier on 8 March 1945. He was twice mentioned in despatches, the second of these being amongst a list of soldiers honoured for the 1944-5 campaign.

Lloyd was with the Allied forces which liberated Bergen-Belsen concentration camp. He seldom spoke about Belsen, but later recalled seeing inmates living like animals, defecating in public view, and that there was no smell from the 10,000 corpses lying unburied (another 17,000 died after liberation) as they were emaciated, with no flesh to putrefy. Lloyd was also sent by Dempsey to identify Heinrich Himmler's body following his suicide. Lloyd ended his active army service with the honorary rank of colonel. Apart from his CBE, he was also decorated with the U.S. Legion of Merit in the degree of commander.

==== Post-war ====
On 18 July 1947, Lloyd was appointed the honorary colonel of 349 37th (Tyne Electrical Engineers) Light Anti-Aircraft Regiment, Royal Artillery. He was awarded the Territorial Decoration (TD) in August 1951. He retired from the Territorial Army Reserve on 2 March 1955 with the honorary rank of colonel.

=== Early Parliamentary career ===
Lloyd was elected to the House of Commons to represent Wirral in the 1945 general election by a majority of 16,625.

His maiden speech on 12 February 1946 was not on an anodyne constituency matter as is usual for new MPs, but instead on the Trades Disputes and Trades Unions Bill, reflecting his interest in the subject going back to his student days. Lloyd's entry to Parliament gave him a headstart over other rising Conservative politicians who did not enter Parliament until 1950. He became a member of the "Young Turks" faction of the Conservative Party. He was able to stand out amongst the small contingent of Conservative MPs in the 1945–50 Parliament, and worked closely with both Anthony Eden and Rab Butler.

Lloyd continued his legal career, taking silk in 1947. He was the Recorder of Wigan between 1948 and 1951. In 1946-7 his annual earnings including his salary as an MP were £4,485, of which the bar made up £3,231 (around £150,000 and £110,000 at 2016 prices). In 1947-8 his earnings dropped to £3,140, of which £1,888 was at the bar (around £100,000 and £60,000 at 2016 prices). Thereafter his earnings continued to decline, as he was busy in Parliament and with his recordership, and he did not have time to carve out a new niche for himself as a King's Counsel either on the North-West Circuit or in London.

Lloyd expressed his opposition to capital punishment during the passage of the Criminal Justice Act 1948, and built relationships with other abolitionist MPs including Sidney Silverman. Lloyd gave a dissenting voice on the Beveridge Broadcasting Committee, and was sometimes known as "The Father of Commercial Television" after his minority report of 1949 helped inspire the setting-up of ITV in 1955. Lloyd believed that competition would help to raise standards, although in later life he came to be disappointed at how much of television time was given over to entertainment.

== Ministerial offices ==
=== Minister of State for Foreign Affairs ===
When the Conservatives returned to power under Churchill in 1951, Lloyd served under Foreign Secretary Anthony Eden as Minister of State for Foreign Affairs from 1951 to 1954. Lloyd later claimed (his biographer D.R. Thorpe writes that the story had clearly grown in the telling) that on his appointment he protested: 'But, sir, there must be some mistake. I do not speak any foreign language. Except in war, I have never visited any foreign country. I do not like foreigners. I have never spoken in any foreign-affairs debate in the House. I have never listened to one.' 'Young man, these all seem to me to be positive advantages,' growled Churchill in return. Churchill initially thought Selwyn Lloyd "that most dangerous of men, the clever fool" after he signed an agreement at the UN after misunderstanding his brief, when the order was to be noncommittal. Churchill later revised his opinion upwards. In June 1952 Lloyd and Field Marshal Lord Alexander (Minister of Defence) visited Korea, first calling on Alexander's old subordinate General Mark Clark, now UN Supreme Commander in the Region, then the South Korean leader Syngman Rhee, then the Korean battlefield. They returned via Ottawa (where Alexander had recently been Governor-general) and Washington, where they visited President Truman.

While attending the United Nations and related international diplomatic gatherings, became closer to India's Krishna Menon, ultimately being accused by Dean Acheson of being a card-carrying member of the "Menon cabal'' alongside Canada's Lester Pearson and Australia's R. C. Casey.

In Egypt, which had been a British client state since 1883, the pro-British King Farouk was overthrown in July 1952. Lloyd helped to negotiate the treaty (12 February 1953) which gave Sudan (in theory jointly administered by Britain and Egypt) self-government for three years as a stepping-stone to a decision on full independence. Lloyd visited Cairo in March 1953, where he met the new Egyptian leader General Neguib, and his right-hand man Colonel Nasser. In February 1954 Lloyd met Neguib again in Khartoum. His visit to the Sudan saw riots in Khartoum and worries that he might meet the same fate as General Gordon in 1885. He wrote of the Sudan: "It is futile to try and outstay one's welcome". Later in February 1954 Neguib was ousted by Nasser. The Suez Base Agreement, whereby Britain agreed to withdraw her troops from Egypt by 1956, was on 27 July 1954. Lloyd would have preferred a slower withdrawal.

Lloyd attended over a hundred Cabinet meetings, many of them whilst covering for Eden during his serious illness in 1953.

=== Minister of Supply and Minister of Defence ===
Lloyd was promoted to Minister of Supply, responsible for supplying the Armed Forces, in October 1954.

Lloyd entered the Cabinet as Minister of Defence on Eden's accession to the premiership in April 1955. Just after the 1955 election, along with Rab Butler, Lord Salisbury and Harold Macmillan, he was put on the committee to advise Eden about the upcoming summit, the first since the war.

He was Minister of Defence, a very prestigious post in Conservative eyes, for less than a year and the dates of his tenure meant that he was not in office during the annual defence white paper and defence debate; however, he made important innovations in long-term expenditure planning. The chiefs of staff of the three services still had direct right of access to the prime minister. Lloyd began a gradual process of consolidation of control of the Armed Forces which would finally come to fruition a decade or so later, with the three service ministries consolidated into a single Ministry of Defence and the three service chiefs reporting to a powerful Chief of Defence Staff.

=== Foreign secretary under Eden ===
==== Appointment and early months ====
Lloyd was promoted to Foreign Secretary in December 1955, in place of Harold Macmillan who was seen as too strong and independent a figure for Eden's tastes. In his early days at the Foreign Office Lloyd was known to irritate his subordinates with bad puns, such as "Good for Nutting" and "You're a deb, Sir Gladwyn Jebb". The Foreign Office mandarin Sir Evelyn Shuckburgh complained in his diary (9 December 1955) that they were to "be landed with that bloody Selwyn Lloyd".

Eden and Lloyd visited Washington for talks with his American counterpart, Secretary of State John Foster Dulles, on 30 January 1956, and wondered how long Britain could continue to cooperate with Colonel Nasser. Dulles was only willing to offer Britain "moral" support against Nasser. On 31 January Lloyd and Dulles had a private meeting about SEATO. Dulles took the lead in private, but would not lead or support Britain in public, although the two men got on well when Dulles realised that Lloyd could not be browbeaten.

On 21 March Lloyd obtained Cabinet approval for a policy of hostility to Nasser, who was seen as a threat to British interests in the Middle East, and of building new British alliances with Jordan and Iraq. Part of this policy was the withdrawal of American and British financial aid for the Aswan High Dam, which would trigger Nasser's nationalisation of the Canal.

==== Suez Crisis ====
The Suez Crisis began in earnest on 26 July 1956 when Nasser nationalised the Suez Canal. Eden straightaway included Lloyd on the Egypt Committee, which met for the first time on 27 July, and would meet 42 times between then and 9 November. Lloyd preferred negotiations to force and, with his experience of military logistics, was sceptical as to whether a successful invasion could even be mounted. British reservists were called up on 2 August, and on that day Macmillan raised with the Egypt Committee the prospect of Israel attacking Egypt. On 10 August Lloyd had a difficult meeting with the directors of the Suez Canal Company. On 14 August Eden and Lloyd met with the Labour leaders, who were opposed to the use of force without UN authorisation. On 14 August Lloyd broadcast about the crisis to the public, and his talk was published in The Listener.

The first London Conference of nations with an interest in using the canal met from 16 to 23 August, and Lloyd was elected chairman. Lloyd helped to negotiate a formula for a new convention, in which Egypt would receive increased canal revenues and would have a place on the board of a new operating company. On 5 September Lloyd flew to Paris for talks with Spaak about the NATO upcoming meeting. On 7 September Lloyd was warned by his Canadian counterpart Lester Pearson that neither the US nor Canada would allow the UN to be used as a cover for war. On 9 September Nasser rejected the proposals offered by the 18 powers at the London Conference. On 10 September the Cabinet agreed the Egypt Committee Plan to deprive Nasser of Suez Canal revenues, provided the US agreed. At Cabinet on 11 September 1956 (where Lloyd reported that the Menzies Mission had failed) Eden gave what Lloyd later called the "clearest possible indication of intention to use force".

Lloyd chaired the Second London Conference (19 – 21 September), working on Dulles' SCUA (Suez Canal Users' Association) proposal, a plan with which he was willing to cooperate. He wanted an immediate appeal to the UN to enforce rights of passage. On 24 September Lloyd was interviewed on Panorama, and stated that force would only be used as a last resort. On 26 September Lloyd informed the Cabinet about the failure of the Second London Conference. Eden and Lloyd flew to Paris for talks with Guy Mollet (French Prime Minister) and Christian Pineau (French Foreign Minister). At dinner, Harold Macmillan rang from the IMF meeting in New York. On the morning of 27 September there were further Anglo-French talks before Eden and Lloyd returned to London. The Third London Conference opened at 11am on 1 October, but Lloyd flew to New York at 8.30pm that day, and would be out of the country until 16 October. At the UN talks, Britain and France felt that Dulles was not ruling out the use of force as a last resort.

In New York Lloyd attended the United Nations Security Council meeting, where he met Christian Pineau and Dr Fawzi, the French and Egyptian foreign ministers. On 10 and 11 October Lloyd had various talks with Fawzi. By 13 October the Seven Points were agreed, which would become the "Six Principles". Lloyd later wrote that agreement had been reached on the Six Principles, but not on how to implement them, although he conceded that Nasser had never accepted the principle that the Canal could not be under the control of any one country. Fawzi had been sympathetic to Lloyd's Six Principles, but with Soviet encouragement Egypt soon opposed the idea that the Canal not be controlled by any one country. Some of the Cabinet, including Lord Home, thought that Lloyd's "Six Principles" might have avoided armed conflict, while Lloyd himself thought that he had negotiated "a good-natured preamble to a missing treaty".

With Lloyd still in New York, Albert Gazier (acting French Foreign Minister while Pineau was in New York) and General Challe (Deputy Chief of French Air Staff) visited Eden for a secret meeting at Chequers on 14 October. Before the meeting Gladwyn Jebb, who was not invited, sent Eden a personal telegram to dissuade him, but the meeting merely impressed Eden with French resolve. Concerned that if war broke out in the Middle East Britain might have to take the side of her ally Jordan against France's ally Israel, the French leaders outlined "The Plan" to Eden and Nutting: in the event of Israel attacking Egypt, Britain and France would intervene jointly to protect the canal, as Britain was entitled to do under the 1954 Treaty, and enforce international law. Eden recalled Lloyd from New York after Nutting had suggested that no decision could be taken without the foreign secretary.

Lloyd arrived late and jet-lagged for the 16 October meeting of the Egypt Committee in London; Anthony Nutting, junior Foreign Office minister, had stood in for him for the first part of the meeting. Nutting later claimed that on arrival Lloyd told him he'd "clinched it", i.e. achieved a deal in which the Canal would stay nationalised, and that he had replied "we must have nothing to do with this" when Nutting tipped him off about the French plan. When the meeting resumed, Eden did not mention Lloyd's negotiations in New York but instead praised the French plan, which Lloyd later wrote of as "the plan for which I did not care". After an indeterminate discussion, Eden had lunch with Lloyd, and persuaded him that his New York agreement with Fawzi would never hold up and persuaded him to come to Paris to meet the French. At 4pm Eden and Lloyd flew to Paris. In Paris Eden and Lloyd had talks with their French counterparts Prime Minister Guy Mollet and Foreign Minister Christian Pineau.

Nutting later told the author Hugh Thomas that Lloyd had been "brainwashed" by Eden; Thomas toned this down in his 1967 book to "swept along". On 16 October Sir Gladwyn Jebb met Eden and Lloyd at Paris airport. In the car he asked Eden if he'd received his telegram about the French sending Mystere jets to Israel. Over Jebb's protests, the ambassadors were not invited to the Anglo-French talks. Lloyd continued to press his doubts, but to no avail. He urged international control over toll increases, with disputes referred to an independent body. The French insisted that Dulles was double-crossing the British and that SCUA was simply intended to play for time so that the British would not formally appeal to the Security Council. Mollet also said that the Egyptians had made so many threats to exterminate Israel that Israel could legitimately attack Egypt and plead self-defence. Eden was worried that the UK might have to come to Jordan's defence in the event of a Middle Eastern War (Palestinian guerrillas were operating against Israel from the West Bank, which would be under Jordanian control until 1967).

Lloyd later described 18 October as "an important day". Jebb had protested to Ivone Kirkpatrick at the exclusion of the ambassadors from the Anglo-French talks and had sent Lloyd a handwritten threat of resignation. Before the Cabinet meeting at 10 Downing Street that morning, Lloyd buttonholed Rab Butler outside the Cabinet Room. Butler later recorded (and Lloyd's account is similar) that Lloyd had gripped him by the arm, telling him that he had been "wafted" to Paris and warning him confidentially that there might be a preemptive strike by Israel against Jordan, Egypt and Syria. Butler's biographer Michael Jago thinks that Lloyd's behaviour was evidence that he was out of his depth. Lloyd reported to the Cabinet on the Security Council vote to keep the Canal insulated from the politics of any one country, despite Soviet veto of the second part of the resolution. There was to be another meeting in Geneva, with Egyptian participation. The Cabinet approved, but then moved on to Eden's disingenuous warnings that negotiations might be overtaken by hostilities between Israel and Egypt. Eden informed ministers that a plan (Operation "Musketeer Revise") was being drawn up to retake the Canal by force. "Musketeer Revise" was practicable only until the end of October, although in the event a slightly amended version was used for military operations in November. Afterwards Eden circulated a minute that he'd told the French that every effort must be made to stop Israel attacking Jordan, but that he had told Israel that Britain would not come to Egypt's aid in the event of an Israeli attack. Sir Humphrey Trevelyan, British Ambassador to Egypt, telegraphed to warn that Nasser was not willing to compromise on Egyptian control of the Canal. This marked the apparent failure of Lloyd's attempt to negotiate a peaceful settlement and was, in the view of his biographer, the moment which he should perhaps have used an excuse to resign.

Lloyd went to Chequers on Sunday 21 October (having been summoned by Eden on the phone the previous day). The press were told that Lloyd had a cold so that he could go to Paris in secret to meet the Israelis. Lloyd, accompanied by his Private Secretary Donald Logan, then went to Sevres, just outside Paris, on 22 October. Eden insisted that British action not be in response to Israeli demands. Logan drove Lloyd to the airport in his own car to maintain secrecy, although he was not told the destination until they were underway. David Carlton argued that this tied Lloyd into the conspiracy by getting him to meet Ben Gurion. Lloyd met Pineau, who said that the Israelis would attack Egypt but only with Anglo-French air support. Lloyd then, at 7pm, met the Israeli Prime Minister David Ben-Gurion, who like Pineau was disappointed by his obvious lack of enthusiasm for military action. Lloyd warned that the UN, the Commonwealth and Scandinavian countries were opposed to the use of force. Israel demanded that British Canberra bombers bomb Egypt from their bases in Cyprus; Lloyd merely promised to seek the Cabinet's opinion on the matter. Lloyd demanded that British airstrikes be delayed for 48 hours after the outbreak of hostilities, so that collusion would not be too obvious, but in the end compromised on 36 hours. Lloyd was still worried about an Israeli attack on Jordan. Dayan later recalled that "[Lloyd]'s manner could not have been more antagonistic. His whole demeanour expressed distaste – for the place, the company, and the topic … His opening remarks suggested the tactics of a customer bargaining with extortionate merchants." Lloyd left towards midnight. The next morning, 23 October, Lloyd reported to a group of senior ministers (not the whole Egypt Committee), then to the Cabinet. Eden told the Cabinet that there had been secret talks with Israel in Paris. Lloyd told the Cabinet that he was still hoping for a peaceful settlement, but that the French were not interested in a peaceful settlement and that Nasser would retain his interest in the Middle East. Eden told that Cabinet that, based on what Lloyd said, and contrary to Eden's comments of 18 October, an Israeli attack on Egypt now seemed less likely. Lloyd was in the House of Commons on 24 October, so was not present when the secret Protocol of Sèvres was signed. He refused to return to Sevres as he could hardly pretend to be ill again after having just appeared in public. In his instructions to Patrick Dean, who went in his place, Lloyd stressed that Britain had not asked Israel to intervene. Later that morning Eden informed the Cabinet about the consultation with Pineau the previous evening. The objective of any Anglo-French action would be to control the Canal and secondly to topple Nasser.

The Cabinet further considered the use of force on 24 October. After Cabinet, Lloyd recorded his UN Day Broadcast for the BBC, for transmission that evening. He then had a tense meeting with Ivone Kirkpatrick and Gladwyn Jebb, who was still angry at being kept in the dark. At 11pm Lloyd went to 10 Downing Street to hear Dean's report on the second Sevres meeting. Mountbatten (First Sea Lord) also attended. The French had produced three copies of a typed document, the Protocol of Sèvres. Eden later tried in vain to retrieve the French and Israeli copies to destroy the evidence of collusion. On the morning of 25 October Eden told the Cabinet that Israel would attack Egypt after all, but did not tell them about the secret Sevres Protocol. The Plan for an Anglo-French invasion was revealed to the Cabinet.

Israel attacked Egypt in the Sinai on 29 October; Eden was informed that night and informed the Cabinet the next day. At Cabinet on the morning of 30 October Lloyd reported that the US was ready to move a motion at the UN condemning Israel as an aggressor, and proposed a delay in order to bring the Americans on board. This suggestion was not adopted. At 4.30pm on 30 October Eden announced the Anglo-French ultimatum to the House of Commons. The House became so rowdy that it had to be suspended for the first time since 1924. Britain and France began bombing Egypt on 31 October, despite hostility from the Opposition, the US and most of the Commonwealth. The US Sixth Fleet harassed the Anglo-French taskforce as it made its way to the Eastern Mediterranean. William Yates, a Conservative MP, commented in the House of Commons that he had heard talk of a secret conspiracy; Lloyd stated in the Commons that "It is quite wrong to state that Israel was incited to this action by Her Majesty's Government. There was no prior agreement between us about it." This passage is underlined in Lloyd's personal copy of Hansard (now in the library at Fettes School). He regarded it as a lawyerishly careful statement although it has been portrayed by some writers as an outright lie to the House of Commons.

Nasser proclaimed martial law and mobilisation in Egypt. In an emergency session of the UN, Dulles' motion for a ceasefire was vetoed by Britain. Nutting resigned because of the breach of the 1954 Treaty, the Tripartite Treaty and the UN Charter. Lloyd resisted the temptation to join him and continued to ask questions about military logistics at Cabinet. The US sidestepped the Anglo-French veto on the UN Security Council by obtaining an overwhelming vote for a ceasefire in the General Assembly. The Cabinet agreed that even in the event of a ceasefire between Egypt and Israel, Anglo-French forces should still seize the Canal in a policing role until UN forces were able to take up the baton. At the 4.30pm Cabinet, records for which were closed until 2007, Lloyd was concerned about the effect on Britain's Arab client states of being seen to be too closely linked to Israel. Eden spoke about the conditions which would be necessary for the UN to take over the peacekeeping job at the canal. At the 9.30pm Cabinet Lloyd reported on the problem of arms exports to Israel, and reported that he had been asked by BP whether or not to divert a cargo of aviation fuel currently intended for Israel. At Cabinet on Friday 2 November Lloyd suggested that in the event of oil sanctions Britain might have to occupy Kuwait and Qatar. On Saturday 3 November Lloyd was shouted down in the House of Commons, in a debate so rowdy that the Speaker had to suspend the session.

By the weekend of 3–4 November, fighting between Israel and Egypt had largely ceased. Lloyd called Sunday 4 November "one of the most dramatic days in the whole of the Suez Crisis". He spent the whole day at 10 Downing Street, first in private talks with Eden, during which he advised that to call off the operation at this late stage would lead to "dreadful consequences". Afterwards Lloyd rang Gladwyn Jebb in Paris and asked him to arrange a further meeting with Pineau, Bourges-Manoury and Jebb himself. There was then a meeting of the Egypt Committee at 12.30pm. Lloyd reported that the US had not pushed for a vote on her UN General Assembly resolution, but that resolutions calling for a UN peacekeeping force had been proposed by Canada and by a group of African and Asian countries. Lloyd advised that Britain should respond to the Canadian but not to the Afro-Asian ultimatum, but warned of the threat of oil sanctions. There was a second meeting of the Egypt Committee at 3.30pm, at which Lloyd passed on the warning of the British Ambassador to Iraq that Britain had to condemn Israeli aggression in order to preserve her status in Arab eyes. He also raised the question of what would happen if both Israel and Egypt agreed to a ceasefire before British and French troops had gone in. There was then a meeting of the full Cabinet at 6.30pm, at which the decision to invade Egypt was taken. Butler, Kilmuir and Heathcoat Amory wanted to postpone the paratroop landings for 48 hours, while Salisbury, Buchan-Hepburn and Monckton (the latter of whom hinted that he might resign) wanted to postpone indefinitely. Lloyd was among the majority of the 18 present who wanted to push ahead with the invasion. Throughout the meetings that day the Trafalgar Square demonstration had been audible outside. British and French paratroops landed at dawn on 5 November. Lloyd was given a rough ride in the House of Commons when he announced the Soviet crushing of the Hungarian uprising. The news of Nutting's resignation came through at 6.30pm while Lloyd was attending a sherry party at 10 Downing Street ahead of the State Opening of Parliament. However, Gladwyn Jebb sent a message that Douglas Dillon, US Ambassador in Paris, had no issue with the landings and thought Dulles' policy "lamentable". On the morning of 6 November Macmillan, who had been told by Humphrey (US Treasury Secretary) that there would be no more financial assistance until there was a ceasefire, saw Lloyd before Cabinet and told him that Britain had to stop in view of the drain of foreign exchange reserves. Macmillan had also been lobbying other ministers. Cabinet met at 9.45am; Lloyd was one of three ministers (along with Antony Head and James Stuart) to support Eden in his wish to carry on fighting. The Cabinet agreed that there was no choice but to agree a ceasefire. Royal Marines had been landing by sea and helicopter on 6 November, and British and French forces had Port Said and had advanced 23 miles to El Cap by the time a ceasefire was announced at 5pm.

On 7 November the United Nations General Assembly passed a resolution calling for withdrawal of British, French and Israeli forces. Lloyd's initial position was that Britain was not prepared to withdraw her forces until they had been replaced by a peacekeeping force acceptable to Britain. The Americans met this idea with extreme hostility, insisting on total British withdrawal. Lloyd flew to New York on Sunday 11 November and stayed until the evening of Monday 27 November. Whilst Lloyd was away, on 13 November Macmillan, who was busily ingratiating himself with the Americans, told Aldrich (US Ambassador to London) that Selwyn Lloyd was "too young and inexperienced" for his position. On 20 November 1956 the question of collusion was raised in Cabinet, with Eden and Lloyd both absent; it was agreed to stick to Lloyd's formula that Britain had not incited the Israeli attack. In Washington Lloyd managed to speak to Eisenhower's adviser Walter Bedell Smith, and addressed the UN General Assembly on Friday 23 November, the day Eden left for Jamaica. In a speech which was essentially an acceptance of an Argentinian motion, Lloyd offered to hand over to a UN peacekeeping force and claimed that Britain had prevented a small war growing into a larger one. Despite a hostile attack by Krishna Menon, the resolution was carried.

Lloyd addressed a Cabinet meeting (chaired by Butler, with Eden away in Jamaica) at 4.30pm on Wednesday 28 November. He said that the UN would continue to debate the matter and that although Britain could hold on for another three or four weeks there was nothing to be gained in antagonising world opinion any further. He offered his resignation (not mentioned in the minutes) but his colleagues refused to accept it, and was later deeply hurt when Lord Hinchingbrooke, a member of the Suez group (a group of Conservative backbenchers who had opposed Britain's original agreement to withdraw from Egypt in 1954), said that he should have resigned. Lloyd's impending divorce was given as the ostensible reason for his offer of resignation. Throughout November and into early December Lloyd was strongly attacked in the House of Commons both by Labour as a scapegoat for the original invasion and by Conservative backbenchers for the enforced withdrawal. On 3 December Lloyd made a statement announcing British withdrawal to a very hostile House, followed by an angry scene, then Butler made a similar announcement, leading many Conservative MPs feeling that Butler should have made the statement himself. The House of Commons held a No Confidence debate on Suez on 5 December. Aneurin Bevan commented that Lloyd gave the impression of never having warned Israel not to attack Egypt. Bevan congratulated Lloyd on "having survived so far". The government won the confidence vote on 6 December by 327 votes to 260. In early December Lloyd again offered his resignation to the Cabinet, citing his impending divorce as the excuse.

=== Foreign Secretary under Macmillan ===
==== Reappointment ====
When Eden resigned in January 1957, Lord Salisbury interviewed the Cabinet one by one, asking each whether he preferred Butler (believed to be the favourite by most outsiders) or Macmillan (the overwhelming choice of the Cabinet) for the succession. Salisbury listed Lloyd as the only minister to abstain, shocking Lord Chancellor Kilmuir, who acted as official witness to the "soundings". Lloyd later confirmed to Butler in September 1962 that he had expressed no preference.

Macmillan retained Lloyd as foreign secretary, declaring that "one head on a charger is enough" (i.e. that Eden's resignation was enough of a sacrifice to appease the government's critics). Another reason was Macmillan's wish to keep Butler out of the Foreign Office. Lloyd was paradoxically a beneficiary of Suez, as Eden might well have reshuffled him away from the Foreign Office. Macmillan delegated a lot more than Eden, and allowed Lloyd to come into his own. Lloyd was allowed to use Chequers, normally the Prime Minister's country residence, although Macmillan did not formally renounce the use of the place as by law he would not have been allowed to claim it back in the space of that Parliament (Macmillan had a country home of his own, Birch Grove, and so had no need of the place). Although Lloyd was not particularly interested in the job, Macmillan tried to encourage him to think of himself as a potential prime minister, as a rival to Butler. Lloyd's reappointment was met, in the words of a contemporary observer, with a "long, cold arch of raised eyebrows", whilst Aneurin Bevan likened Lloyd to a monkey to Macmillan's organgrinder.

==== 1957 ====
As foreign secretary, Lloyd had to accompany the Queen and the Duke of Edinburgh on their State Visit to Portugal in February 1957.

Lloyd accompanied Macmillan to Bermuda (21-4 March), where Anglo-American relations were repaired, although private discussions were more frank than the press releases might have suggested. Over dinner Lloyd launched a strong attack on Nasser; Dulles replied that the USA would not defend Nasser's regime but were not actively going to try to overthrow him. Whilst in Bermuda Macmillan, after consultation with Lloyd, agreed to release Archbishop Makarios, who had been exiled to the Seychelles in March 1956, after being advised that this might calm EOKA down. This prompted the resignation of Lord Salisbury from the Cabinet.

Lloyd's divorce was in progress between March and June 1957. He tried to resign in May 1957, citing as the reason the unfavourable publicity which his divorce might attract. In May 1957 Randolph Churchill speculated that he might be about to be removed from office. At one point that year Beaverbrook's "Daily Express" ran a picture of Lloyd with a lady on holiday in Spain, asking "Who is the senorita?" In fact the lady and her husband – who was doctored out of the photograph – were long-standing friends of Lloyd and were sharing a holiday with him.

In October 1957 he likened himself to a "human Sputnik" because of the amount of flying he was doing.

==== 1958 ====
Lloyd again offered his resignation after a poor performance in the two-day Foreign Affairs debate in February 1958, but Macmillan refused to accept it as he had recently had his entire Treasury team (Peter Thorneycroft, Nigel Birch and Enoch Powell) resign.

In May 1958 Lebanese President Camille Chamoun appealed for help against the United Arab Republic (Egypt and Syria, both ruled by Nasser). Lloyd coordinated with Dulles and US troops were sent to Lebanon in accordance with the "Eisenhower Doctrine". Two British paratroop battalions were sent to Jordan after a request by King Hussein.

Lloyd wanted to go to the Anglo-American Washington talks in June 1958 but Dulles vetoed this, claiming that if he went it would be necessary to invite the French as well. In July, the Mutual Defence Agreement with the United States was signed by Assistant Under-Secretary and Deputy Ambassador Samuel Hood, 6th Viscount Hood. On Monday 14 July 1958 Macmillan was at Birch Grove, and recorded that Lloyd "almost shouted down the line" about the revolution in Iraq, warning that Jordan and Syria might also fall to Nasser. Macmillan sent him to Washington to sound out Dulles. By August 1958 Lloyd publicly supported the US over Formosa whilst privately urging restraint. He also had private talks with Churchill that summer to seek his advice.

Lloyd had been very sceptical that Macmillan would be able to negotiate a Greek-Turkish agreement over Cyprus. In December 1958 at a NATO Ministerial Council Lloyd negotiated the concept of "sovereign bases" in Cyprus, where the governor was his old Cambridge contemporary Hugh Foot, with the Greek and Turkish foreign ministers.

Macmillan wrote of Lloyd in his diary (31 December 1958) that "he really is an extraordinary (sic) capable and efficient man – as well as a wonderfully agreeable man to work with. He feels a great sense of gratitude and loyalty to me personally, for I have been able (by moral support both in private and in public) to help him through a bad time" [i.e. his divorce]. D. R. Thorpe describes Lloyd as "Sancho Panza to Macmillan's mercurial Quixote".

==== 1959 ====
In November 1958 Khrushchev had demanded that the western powers pull out of West Berlin within six months. This was a prime reason for Macmillan and Lloyd's trip to Moscow early in 1959, besides the desire to grandstand ahead of the impending general election. Lloyd accompanied Macmillan to Moscow in February–March 1959. Much of the planning for the summit had had to take place at the Middlesex Hospital, where Lloyd was having his tonsils out. Lloyd also attended planning meetings at Chequers in late February.

At Moscow Ambassador Sir Patrick Reilly wrote that he was "quite first class and they make an admirable team" and "the ideal second", keeping his boss supplied with facts and figures and willingly undertaking tedious detailed negotiations. Macmillan thanked Lloyd for having come up with the idea of a diplomatic cold in response to Khrushchev's diplomatic toothache. Afterwards Lloyd reported on the summit to Charles de Gaulle and Konrad Adenauer. Lloyd also accompanied Macmillan to Ottawa, where they met John Diefenbaker and Washington, DC in March 1959, where they met Eisenhower and visited the dying Dulles.

Lloyd was the leader at the Foreign Ministers' conference in Geneva in June 1959 (with Christian Herter, Maurice Couve de Murville and Andrei Gromyko) and kept it going, allowing Eisenhower to issue his invitation to Khrushchev to visit Washington in August. Whilst the conference had been in progress a false story had appeared in "The Times", fanned by Randolph Churchill and to Macmillan's apparent annoyance, that Lloyd was to be moved from the Foreign Office. The conference ended on 11 August.

During the victorious 1959 election campaign Lloyd made a national broadcast on 19 September.

==== 1959–60 ====
Lloyd kept a detailed diary between 1 November 1959 and his sacking from the Exchequer in July 1962. Many of the press still saw Lloyd as an insignificant Foreign Secretary, although this was no longer the opinion of many of those who knew him. Lloyd also accompanied Macmillan to a meeting in Paris in December 1959. He approved of Macmillan's "Winds of Change" speech in February 1960, which predicted the end of rule by Europeans in Africa. In February 1960 Lloyd urged Macmillan, having rebuilt bridges with the Americans, to build bridges with France by accepting de Gaulle's invitation to visit him for a longer stay, a turn of events which Macmillan would use to try to persuade de Gaulle to support British membership of the EEC.

In March 1960 Lloyd noted that his one unfulfilled ambition was to be Lord Chancellor, but he did not consider himself a distinguished enough lawyer for the post – he was later to change his mind when Lord Dilhorne was appointed. In mid-May 1960 he accompanied Macmillan to the Four Power Summit in Paris, which broke up in disarray after the U2 had been shot down whilst flying over the USSR. Some see the failure of this summit as the moment when Macmillan's premiership went into decline.

Agreement was finally reached over Cyprus on 1 July 1960, just before the end of Lloyd's time at the Foreign Office.

=== Chancellor of the Exchequer ===
==== Appointment and economic backdrop ====
In July 1960 Macmillan moved Lloyd to the job of Chancellor of the Exchequer. He was Macmillan's third chancellor and asked for, and was given, an assurance that he would remain in place until the next General Election. Lloyd was permitted to remain at Chequers and was also allowed to keep 1, Carlton Gardens, normally the Foreign Secretary's London residence (the chancellor's usual London residence of 11 Downing Street was not available, as Downing Street was being reconstructed at the time, requiring Macmillan to live at Admiralty House for most of his premiership).

Macmillan, with bitter memories of his time as MP for Stockton in the 1930s, wanted to be free of what he saw as the economic orthodoxy of the Treasury and Bank of England, and to generate economic growth, a view which he shared with many economic thinkers at the time. He also wanted growth to increase exports, so as to improve the balance of payments without deflation or devaluing the currency. He declined to appoint David Eccles, Iain Macleod or Reginald Maudling, any of whom might have been better qualified to be chancellor, as he wanted a loyal "staff officer". Lloyd, however, warned Macmillan that he wanted to be an orthodox chancellor.

The economy had been booming as a result of the expansionary measures taken in the run-up to the 1959 General Election, with consequent risk to inflation. Furthermore, the balance of payments was moving into deficit, with Britain's share of world manufacturing falling dramatically as continental Europe, now grouped into the EEC, recovered from the effects of the war. In 1960 Britain suffered the worst balance of payments crisis since 1950, masked a little by the inflow of foreign money into London. The Treasury was already somewhat discredited. Bank Rate had already been raised to 6% by Lloyd's predecessor Heathcote Amory in June. Soon after his appointment, Lloyd asked Treasury economic advisor Robert Hall (29 July 1960) "how soon we were going bust". On 16 March 1961 Lloyd wrote to Macmillan complaining that No 10 was briefing the press than Macmillan was in real charge of economic policy, and indeed policy in other areas. Also the German Deutschmark was revalued by 5% in March 1961, leading to worries that the pound sterling might crash in the summer of 1961.

==== 1961: Budget and July measures ====
Lloyd arranged government funding for the National Theatre on the South Bank. His first Budget (17 April 1961) began by saying that during the 1960-1 fiscal year there had been a deficit of £394m, £76m more than Amory had forecast in the 1960 budget. Lloyd was concerned at rising inflation and public spending. The Budget was intended to be deflationary, and to reduce the government borrowing requirement to £69m for 1961-2 (in the event it was £211m), but increased taxes by less than the Treasury wanted. The budget introduced "the Regulator", which allowed the Chancellor of the day to vary the rate of most indirect taxes by up to 10% of the existing rate (not ten percentage points) without the need for prior Parliamentary approval, although Parliament had to approve within three weeks. Another measure, effectively a second Regulator (brought in over the objections of John Boyd-Carpenter, Minister of Pensions and National Insurance) allowed the Chancellor to increase Employers' NICs by up to 4 shillings per week. Lloyd also raised the threshold for surtax on earned income, which had been unchanged since Lloyd George had introduced it in 1909, from £2,000 per annum to £5,000. This measure had actually been Macmillan's idea.

By the summer a run on the pound was threatened. Continental banks, who had been buying pounds, now announced that they had enough of a stockpile (£300m) and the Treasury demanded cuts of £300m in demand and a cancellation of the raising of the surtax threshold – the latter was a politically impossible demand. Some ministers suggested floating the pound, an option which Macmillan discussed in his diary on 23 July, although he rejected it as it would have irritated the Americans and would have had to be accompanied by deflation. In fact the balance of payments was already moving back into surplus, but based on out-of-date Treasury figures ("last year's Bradshaw" as Macmillan once famously quipped) Lloyd announced a package of measures on 25 July: bank rate was raised to 7%, public spending was cut, and $1.5bn was borrowed from the IMF, along with conditions, although not as strict as the IMF would have liked. Macmillan wrote to ministers on 28 July ordering public spending restraint. Lloyd refused to use his power to increase Employers' NICs in the July measures, saying it was "a dead rat". Cairncross, who had succeeded Robert Hall as the government's economic advisor, believed that Lloyd might have given some kind of private promise not to actually use it.

Lloyd also announced a Pay Pause on 25 July, until 31 March 1962. Labour moved into a 5-point lead in the opinion polls. The Pay Pause (effectively an incomes policy) made Lloyd a focus of public unpopularity. It mainly affected public sector employees such as nurses and teachers as many private companies had contractual arrangements for automatic pay rises or arbitration.

==== 1961: NEDC ====
Lloyd had announced that there would be a new economic planning body as part of his 25 July measures. On 8 August Lloyd suggested inviting Industry and Trade Union leaders. There was a stormy meeting of the Cabinet on 21 September, at which only John Hare and Lord Hailsham supported him, but covert support for the proposal from Macmillan swung other ministers behind the scheme. On 23 September, after a period of consultation, formal invitations were issued to the TUC, the Federation of British Industry, the British Employers' Confederation, the National Union of Manufacturers and the Association of British Chambers of Commerce. He told them of his plans to set up the National Economic Development Council (NEDC) in imitation of the French Commissariat du Plan, chaired by the Chancellor, and containing a few other ministers, as well as other appointed members who would include leading trade unionists and business leaders, as well perhaps as other economic thinkers. He also proposed setting up a National Economic Development Organisation (NEDO), whose chair would be drawn from outside the civil service, to advise NEDC. Lloyd did not get on with trade unionists. The TUC, which disliked the Pay Pause, agreed to cooperate only on condition that they were not expected to preach wage restraint. Thorpe writes that Lloyd had Macmillan's backing against a sceptical Cabinet, but Williams writes that Lloyd was lukewarm about the NEDC, which was Macmillan's project.

Henry Brooke was appointed to the new position of Chief Secretary to the Treasury in October 1961 so Lloyd did not have to spend all his time arguing with Cabinet colleagues about their planned level of expenditure. The NEDC was unlikely to reap any benefits by the time of the next general election, nor to help in reining pay in. There was a big pay increase in the electricity industry in November 1961, because of the strength of the unions and the weakness of the minister Richard Wood. The Pay Pause had brought short term benefits but anomalies had made it unpopular, something it shared with later incomes policies. There was even a threat to strike by the 120 workers who made cricket balls.

==== 1962: second budget and Orpington ====
On 29 January 1962 John Hare, Minister of Labour, confirmed that the Pay Pause would end on 31 March. Lloyd presented a White Paper on Incomes Policies, urging an official "Guiding Light" of 2.5%, a rate which the government expected pay to be increased by companies and tribunals. The White Paper also condemned automatic wage increases because of cost of living increases and comparability between different types of work. In presenting his White Paper on Incomes Policy Lloyd was seen as "stubborn" "wooden" "inarticulate" and "unimaginative" (Harold Evans Downing Street Diary). He also performed poorly in putting across government policy on television.

On 14 February 1962, over whisky at 10 Downing Street, Macmillan persuaded the railway union bosses to call off their planned strike, an achievement trumpeted by the press as "Mac's Triumph". The NEDC first met on 7 March 1962. The Liberals did very well at a by-election at Conservative-held Blackpool North on 13 March 1962, and took Orpington off the Conservatives at another by-election on 14 March, a sensational victory in a seat adjacent to Macmillan's own seat at Bromley. Party Chairman Iain Macleod's report blamed the Pay Pause for the defeat at Orpington.

In April 1962, on the eve of Lloyd's second and final budget, he faced a Cabinet rebellion over Schedule A tax (a tax on the theoretical rental value of a house, paid by the homeowner). The Conference Party Conference at Scarborough in October 1960 had voted for the abolition of Schedule A and the Cabinet now insisted on it. Lloyd promised to end Schedule A the following year, at a cost of £50m to the Exchequer. In his 9 April 1962 Budget Lloyd announced an agreed growth target of 4% per annum (he would have preferred 5%). This was in line with current rates of growth in continental Europe, but the Treasury were sceptical that the UK could achieve it, rightly as it turned out. The question of the growth in public spending was left unresolved. In the 1962 Budget Lloyd also increased profits tax by 2.5% and brought in a speculative gains tax, although he stopped short of introducing a capital gains tax, which he thought would discourage saving and enterprise. The budget, on 9 April 1962, reduced purchase tax on cars, TVs and washing machines but increased it on sweets, soft drinks and ice cream, leading to claims that Lloyd was "taxing children's pocket money." The tax on confectionery was expected to raise £30m that year and £50m in a full year. Rumours were already circulating that Lloyd's days in the job were numbered: the journalist William Rees-Mogg wrote that it was "Mr Lloyd's last Budget".

Macmillan appears to have agreed that the 1962 budget could not be a popular one, but the Cabinet revolt, which Lloyd lacked the eloquence to counter, was an embarrassment to Macmillan as well, which added to Macmillan's irritation with Lloyd. Lloyd also argued that confidence had been restored – a run on the pound had been averted, £225m of the $1.5bn (£535m) borrowed the previous year had been repaid to the IMF, and the balance of payments was improving.

Many industrialists also felt that Britain's economic problems, especially her balance of payments deficit, should be solved by expansion, not by contraction, a view shared by Labour Leader Hugh Gaitskell, and by Roy Jenkins, who in the budget debate quoted the "Financial Times" to the effect that the budget had done nothing for exports or for investment.

==== 1962: Macmillan's wish for an incomes policy ====
Macmillan, disingenuously, as he had already decided to sack him, wrote to Lloyd on 11 April congratulating him and asking him to begin preparing an expansionary budget for 1963 to help the Conservatives win re-election. During 1962 Lloyd's credibility and that of the Treasury was further damaged when it became clear that the Treasury had overestimated the strength of the economy, meaning that the July 1961 measures had been excessively severe. Bank Rate was cut to 4.5% on 26 April, and £70m of Special Deposits were released on 31 May.

Macmillan was pushing for a full-on incomes policy, led by the NEDC, in the hope that his growth policy would not lead to inflation. He addressed the Cabinet about economic policy on 28 May 1962, stressing that he wanted Britain to achieve low unemployment, low inflation, high growth and a strong pound, and that this could best be achieved by an incomes policy to boost productivity. Lloyd was sceptical. The Liberals did very well at another by-election at West Derbyshire on 6 June.

On 19 June Macmillan presented his ideas on incomes policy to three or four colleagues at Chequers. Macmillan urged a "guiding light" (a target for wage increases as had been agreed at the beginning of the year), a Standing Commission on Pay (but with power only to give advice, not to coerce wage settlements), abolition of Resale Price Maintenance (in the end this would be done by Edward Heath in 1964) and creation of a Consumers Council; Lloyd was sceptical but the other ministers seemed in favour.

Macmillan had lunch with Butler on 21 June to discuss the impending reshuffle. Macleod, Lord Home, Martin Redmayne (Chief Whip) and Sir Norman Brook (Cabinet Secretary and Joint Permanent Secretary to the Treasury) were all urging Macmillan to change his chancellor, in Brook's case for reasons of civil service management rather than politics. Macmillan also suspected that Lloyd, Butler and/or Eccles might be plotting against him. 22 June saw ministerial discussion of Macmillan's incomes paper; 6 July saw another ministerial discussion.

==== Dismissal ====
Macmillan would have liked to appoint Lloyd Home Secretary, as he was moving Rab Butler from this post, but Lloyd had made clear when Macmillan became prime minister in January 1957 that as an opponent of capital punishment it would not be proper for him to accept that position (because a person sentenced to hang was entitled to appeal to the Monarch for mercy, which in practice meant that the Home Secretary, to whom the task was delegated, had the final say on whether any execution should proceed).

Macmillan planned to break the news of his impending dismissal to Lloyd, but Butler leaked it to the press first – the news appeared in the "Daily Mail" on the morning of 12 July. 12 July was also the day of the Leicester North East by-election, and Cabinet were due to discuss incomes policy. At the by election the Conservative share of the vote dropped from 48.1% in 1959 to 24.2%. That evening Lloyd was sacked from the government and returned to the backbenches, after a 45-minute meeting which Macmillan described as "a terribly difficult and emotional scene". Next morning, 13 July, Macmillan carried out the rest of his changes after hearing, from Lord Home, that Lloyd had tried in vain to get John Hare, Minister of Labour, to resign in protest. He sacked a third of his Cabinet in a brutal reshuffle which came to be known as the "Night of the Long Knives". Macmillan later claimed that he had intended to postpone the full reshuffle until the autumn.

Unless one counts Butler's removal in December 1955, Lloyd was the only Chancellor of the postwar era to be sacked outright until Norman Lamont in May 1993. He was replaced by Reginald Maudling, then seen as a potential future Leader of the Conservative Party, and whose remit was to reflate the economy going into the next General Election due by the end of 1964. Lloyd privately thought Macmillan too obsessed with unemployment, risking higher inflation. Lloyd was seen to have been badly treated. He was cheered to the echo when he reentered the Commons Chamber after his sacking, whereas Macmillan entered in silence from his own party and jeers from the Opposition, and was subjected to public criticism (then almost unprecedented) from his predecessor Lord Avon. Nigel Birch, who had resigned along with Chancellor Thorneycroft in 1958, wrote to the newspapers on 14 July 1962: "For the second time the Prime Minister has got rid of a Chancellor of the Exchequer who tried to get expenditure under control. Once is more than enough."

Having refused the offer of a peerage from Macmillan, on 20 July 1962 Lloyd was appointed a Member of the Order of the Companions of Honour. His name had been added to the list at the last minute; he would have preferred to decline, thinking it an honour more suited to alumni of the Arts, but was persuaded by friends to accept. In his unpublished memoirs he would later write that he had tried to avoid "a bitter resentment against Macmillan" for the sake of his peace of mind.

Lloyd left his black Labrador, "Sambo", for whom there was no room in his London flat, behind at Chequers, where he had been living since his divorce. At a meeting of the new Cabinet later that summer, Sambo came sniffing amongst the ministers searching for his master. Macmillan ignored the animal, which was likened by one observer to Banquo's ghost.

=== Out of office ===
Lloyd did not regard his political career as over, and declined the chairmanship of Martins Bank and other City posts, although became non-executive director at The Rank Organisation. Macmillan, shaken by the hostile reaction to his moves, arranged a meeting with Lloyd on 1 August. He told him that sacking him had been a mistake and that he was looking for a way to bring him back. Lloyd attributed this to Macmillan's ruthlessness and survival instinct.

Lloyd became a popular figure with Conservative Party members after travelling the country in the bitter winter of 1962–3 (the worst since 1946-7) to write his report on party organisation. Ferdinand Mount writes that northerners recognised Selwyn as "one of their own, someone who had gone to London but had not become in the least stuck up and who never pretended to be someone he wasn't". Macmillan later compared Lloyd to Augustine Birrell for his links to the nonconformist vote of North West England. At Huddersfield he had to give a non-committal reply when Andrew Alexander, then City Editor of The Yorkshire Post, attacked Macmillan's profligate economic policy. His report, urging the proper provision of paid agents in marginal seats, was published in June 1963 so was overshadowed by the Profumo scandal. Lloyd asked John Profumo whether he had had an affair with Christine Keeler, and passed on his denial to Macmillan, adding his own opinion that he did not see how "Jack" could have had the time.

After Macmillan's impending resignation was announced in October 1963, Lloyd was one of those who pressed Alec Douglas-Home to stand for the party leadership. He was a pivotal figure in whipping up support for Home as a potential successor at the Blackpool Conference. He was also an influential figure with the Chief Whip Martin Redmayne. On a walk on the seafront at Blackpool (11 October) Lloyd and Redmayne were accosted by a socialist old age pensioner who told them that Home would make the best prime minister. He helped to dissuade Hailsham, who was initially a candidate for the leadership, from openly opposing Home. "Home was just about the only front-line politician [Lloyd] spoke of without a tinge of contempt." Lloyd visited Macmillan in hospital on Wednesday 16 October, and advised against appointing Rab Butler, who, he said, was disliked in the constituency associations.

=== Return to the front bench ===
Lloyd was called back to the government in 1963 by Alec Douglas-Home. He refused the Home Office. He also refused the Chairmanship of the Party, as he felt he had done what he could and did not want to spend "another winter traipsing around the country". In the end he was appointed Leader of the House of Commons, a job which had already been promised to John Boyd-Carpenter. He was also appointed Lord Privy Seal. On returning to office he likened himself to a man who had won a lawsuit for wrongful dismissal. As Leader of the House he was popular and well-respected across parties, paving the way for his Speakership nearly a decade later. However, Lloyd's policies as chancellor were blamed to some extent for Conservative defeat in the general election of 1964.

Lloyd helped to discourage Thorneycroft from standing for the Conservative leadership in 1965. He supported Maudling, who was defeated by Edward Heath. As Shadow Commonwealth Secretary under Heath, Lloyd visited Australia and New Zealand in late 1965. He also visited Rhodesia, whose white minority regime had recently declared unilateral independence from the UK, in February 1966. There he met 300 people, including 60 Africans, and impressed on Prime Minister Ian Smith that white minority rule could not last. On his return to the UK (in time for the general election campaign in March), Lloyd was attacked both by the left for having seemed to condone the Smith regime and from the right for not having supported it. He returned to the backbenches in 1966, at his own request.

== Speaker of the House of Commons ==
In 1969 Lloyd was captain of the Royal Liverpool Golf Club in its centenary year.

Lloyd continued to serve on many committees and to campaign for the Conservative Party in North-West England. In the 1970 General Election organisational reforms made in response to Lloyd's report of 1963 bore fruit, especially in the North-West, and specifically the provision of more paid agents. The reforms were thought to have resulted in the gain of 10 seats, contributing to Heath's narrow victory. Lloyd was sounded out for, but declined, the Washington Embassy.

In 1971, after the Conservatives had returned to power, Lloyd became Speaker. He was elected Speaker by 294 votes to 55, the opposition coming from those who thought the election was a stitch-up between the leadership of the two main parties. Mindful that the long hours required as Speaker had broken the health of several of his predecessors, he increased the number of deputy speakers to three to ease the burden. His preference was to let as many members as possible be heard, rather than err on the side of firmness, and he also practised what Thorpe describes as "selective deafness" rather than punish every unparliamentary outburst. During tedious debates he would keep alert by constructing mental anagrams of the names of those speaking.

In the Parliamentary debate on Bloody Sunday, Lloyd refused to allow the MP for Mid-Ulster Bernadette Devlin to give her account or to ask questions of the secretary of state, despite Devlin having been an eyewitness to events.

While he was Speaker, he became Deputy High Steward of Cambridge University in 1971, and was appointed to be a Deputy Lieutenant of Merseyside in 1974. In a break with convention, both the Labour and Liberal Parties contested his seat in both the February 1974 and October 1974 general elections, but he retained it. He retired as Speaker on 3 February 1976, when he was raised to the peerage and appointed to be the Steward of the Manor of Northstead.

== Peerage and later life ==
On 8 March 1976 Lloyd was created a life peer as Baron Selwyn-Lloyd, of Wirral in the County of Merseyside, with a corresponding change of his surname to Selwyn-Lloyd. He sat in the House of Lords as a crossbencher.

He became an honorary fellow of his old college, Magdalene. In retirement he lived at Preston Crowmarsh, Oxfordshire. He did a great deal of charity work and was an active patron and generous host to the nearby Oxford University Conservative Association. He died at home of a brain tumour on 17 May 1978. His will was valued at £154,169 for probate (around £750,000 at 2016 prices).

== Books ==
Lloyd remained on very friendly terms with Eden, and the two men cooperated throughout the 1960s and 1970s, over Eden's memoirs and information which they gave, often anonymously, to historians about Suez. In public they maintained the pretence that there had been no collusion with Israel.

Lloyd cooperated in secret with Terence Robinson's 1965 book on Suez and with Hugh Thomas' The Suez Affair (1967). Lloyd insisted to Hugh Thomas (1967) that Britain's priority had always been a peaceful resolution, especially as Britain had only just pulled out of Egypt prior to Suez. Richard Crossman told Hugh Thomas that any attempt to impeach Lloyd would come to nothing because Lloyd was personally popular. Thomas, who was married to Gladwyn Jebb's daughter, began with little sympathy for Eden and Lloyd and came to feel more so, especially as Lloyd told him that Suez was an issue that was simply not black and white.

Nutting (No End of a Lesson: 1967) and Harold Macmillan (whose relevant volume came out in 1971) were also publishing memoirs. Nutting accused Lloyd not of lying but of not telling the whole truth to the House of Commons. Lloyd insisted that this was perfectly legitimate and that this had been the view of Edward Grey and Ernest Bevin. Nutting's book made Lloyd more determined to release his own memoirs in due course.

Lloyd wrote two books, "Mr Speaker, sir" (1976) and "Suez 1956: a Personal View" (1978). Suez 1956 was the first British admission that the Sevres meeting had taken place (it had already been disclosed by Dayan and Pineau). Sir Donald Logan had to help finish the research as Lloyd by then was ill and could not concentrate for longer than ten or fifteen minutes at a time. He insisted that there had been no "collusion" as Britain had acted in good faith, and had not instigated the Israeli attack. Nigel Nicolson thought the book "pathetic".

Lloyd did not live to complete his memoirs, which he had planned to call "A Middle-Class Lawyer from Liverpool" after a famous sneer of Harold Macmillan's at his expense.

== Personal life ==
Lloyd was respected for his cool and shrewd judgement. In public he was "a stiff-necked, prickly, rather off-putting figure" and even in private, after his dismissal from the Exchequer "he had a ruffled, sad look as though bad news had only just reached him." However, he could sometimes be a much more gregarious and charismatic man in private than his reserved public image would have suggested.

Sir Ferdinand Mount, 3rd Bt., wrote that he possessed "an exact appreciation of himself". "He was proud of the things he was patronised for" (being called "the Little Attorney" by Macmillan, or "Mr Hoylake UDC" by Bernard Levin). In politics, he was loyal to his (self-proclaimed) social superiors who often did not display loyalty in return.

Lloyd married his secretary Elizabeth Marshall, known as Bae, daughter of Roland Marshall of West Kirby, a family friend. Lloyd, who still lived with his parents when in the Wirral, and who had never had a serious girlfriend, was uneasy with women. Pamela Berry claimed that Selwyn had told her that he did not much care for sex. He wrote to his parents (November 1950) that "the fatal announcement" of their engagement had been made and that he felt like somebody shivering before getting into a cold bath. The marriage took place on the Wirral on 29 March 1951. Lloyd was 46 whilst Bae, a solicitor by profession, was born in 1928, making her 24 years his junior. At the reception somebody told him that he had a beautiful bride, and he responded that he had a beautiful wedding cake too. Lloyd's younger sister Rachel, and Bae's mother, both had misgivings about the marriage.

Selwyn and Bae had a daughter, Joanna, but divorced in 1957. At the time of Suez, Bae had been in a bad car crash with her lover, whom she later married. Lloyd was awarded custody of his daughter. He remained on friendly terms with his ex-wife after his divorce, but seldom spoke of her to others, so much so that Ferdinand Mount records that he had no idea how her name was pronounced. Rab Butler quipped that Selwyn's wife had left him "because he got into bed with his sweater on".

Following his divorce he was a lonely man and was sometimes known to try to persuade less than keen civil servants to accompany him to the cinema on Saturday afternoons when the week's work was done.

=== Homosexuality ===
After his divorce, rumour sometimes circulated that Lloyd had homosexual inclinations. He entertained young servicemen at Chequers. Sir Ferdinand Mount writes that he was clearly attracted to the young Jonathan Aitken (his godson, who also worked for him in the early 1960s) but showed no interest in Diana Leishman, an attractive young woman who also worked for him. Michael Bloch writes that he was "infatuated with" Aitken who "had some difficulty parrying his advances" and with the young Peter Walker.

The actor Anthony Booth (in his 1989 book Stroll On) claimed that he had been accosted on the Mall by a clearly drunk Selwyn Lloyd, who made a pass at him under the pretext of asking for a light for his cigarette, a recognised courtship ritual among gay men at the time, inviting him back to Admiralty House (which was Lloyd's official residence in 1963-4). Ferdinand Mount comments that such behaviour as alleged by Booth would have been out of character, but adds carefully that "It is not clear whether [Lloyd] was ever gay in the active sense". Charles Williams writes that Lloyd "had a dubious private life" and that his "private life was the subject of much gossip" but offers no further details.

== Assessment ==
Lloyd's obituaries concentrated on his role in Suez. He would have preferred to have been remembered for his minority report on the Beveridge Report on broadcasting, and for setting up the NEDC.

Nigel Nicolson thought him "weak and mendacious" over Suez and recorded that Dag Hammarskjöld regarded him with contempt. However, he acquired a higher reputation as Macmillan's foreign secretary. Sir William Hayter, who worked with Lloyd in Ankara during the Baghdad Pact conference in January 1958, commented on how he had a higher regard for Lloyd after the latter had ceased to be Eden's assistant. "I liked him and even respected him and ... he was really a very able Minister". Thorpe argues that he was not quite in the same league as Bevin or Eden but very much in the next rung. He was happy to listen to expert advice in a way that Eden would not have been.

Edmund Dell describes Lloyd as "not up to the job" of chancellor. He was "a man with limited intellectual horizons ... fortunate to occupy two of the highest offices in the state. He was less fortunate in the timing [Foreign Secretary during Suez then Chancellor at a time of relative economic decline] … there is no evidence that he understood economic arguments … he was a man tied to his brief, lacking the conviction or understanding to make an independent contribution".

However, the real problems with the British economy at this time were, in Dell's view, short-termism (longer time was needed to get results) and an overvalued exchange rate. The immediate cause for Lloyd's dismissal was that Macmillan saw the Treasury as obstructive in drawing up a workable incomes policy, but Dell argues that the real problem was lack of political will, by Macmillan and other ministers, to enforce compulsory wage control. Macmillan wanted the "open air cure" (i.e. public moral pressure to discourage inflationary wage rises), so it is hard to see how Lloyd could have urged anything stronger. A National Incomes Commission ("Nicky") was eventually set up 26 July 1962, after Lloyd's dismissal. It was boycotted by the TUC, who claimed to have been inadequately consulted. It had no compulsory powers, but only powers to demand papers and interview people, and make criticisms of wage settlements which were deemed not in the national interest. Only three cases were ever referred to it.

Ferdinand Mount argues that Lloyd's obituary in The Times was wrong to call him unimaginative and that Lloyd was in fact an innovative chancellor. Macmillan, obsessed with economic expansion, constantly belittled Lloyd in his memoirs. In Mount's view, just as Suez was a watershed in foreign policy, so Macmillan's sacking of Lloyd was a watershed in economic policy, opening the way to the inflation of the 1970s.

Lloyd would sometimes later claim that he might have become prime minister if he had resigned as Foreign Secretary over Suez or if he had made more fuss over his sacking as chancellor. His biographer D.R. Thorpe dismisses this as "wishful thinking", arguing that Lloyd was not even in the same league as Joseph Chamberlain or Rab Butler, politicians who were – in different ways – of first-rank importance despite not becoming prime minister. Rather, he was "more Exeter rather than Balliol", i.e. a respectable middle-ranking Oxford college, rather than a prestigious one.

== Arms ==
Coat of arms of Selwyn Lloyd
Notes Lloyd's arms, as displayed on the peers' staircase Crest On a demi golf ball a seapie Proper. Torse Or Azure and Gules. Escutcheon Per pale Azure and Or on a fess per pale Or and Gules between in chief two bees volant and in base a garb all counterchanged a dragon passant per pale Gules and Or.

== Notes ==
Parliament of the United Kingdom
Preceded by Alan Crosland Graham	Member of Parliament for The Wirral; 1945–1976	Succeeded by David Hunt
Preceded by Horace King	Speaker of the House of Commons; 1971–1976	Succeeded by George Thomas
Political offices
Preceded by Harold Macmillan	Minister of Defence; 1955	Succeeded by Walter Monckton
Preceded by Harold Macmillan	Foreign Secretary; 1955–1960	Succeeded by The Earl of Home
Preceded by Derick Heathcoat Amory	Chancellor of the Exchequer; 1960–1962	Succeeded by Reginald Maudling
Preceded by Iain Macleod	Leader of the House of Commons; 1963–1964	Succeeded by Herbert Bowden
Preceded by Edward Heath	Lord Privy Seal; 1963–1964	Succeeded by The Earl of Longford
