= Dean Acheson =

American politician and lawyer (1893–1971)

51st United States Secretary of State
- In office January 21, 1949 – January 20, 1953
- President: Harry S. Truman
- Preceded by: George C. Marshall
- Succeeded by: John Foster Dulles

14th United States Under Secretary of State
- In office August 16, 1945 – June 30, 1947
- President: Harry S. Truman
- Preceded by: Joseph Grew
- Succeeded by: Robert A. Lovett

1st Assistant Secretary of State for Legislative Affairs
- In office December 20, 1944 – August 15, 1945
- President: Franklin D. Roosevelt; Harry S. Truman
- Preceded by: Position established
- Succeeded by: Ernest A. Gross

Undersecretary of the Treasury
- In office March 1933 – November 15, 1933
- President: Franklin D. Roosevelt
- Preceded by: Position established

Personal details
- Born: Dean Gooderham Acheson; April 11, 1893 Middletown, Connecticut, U.S.
- Died: October 12, 1971 (aged 78) Sandy Spring, Maryland, U.S.
- Resting place: Oak Hill Cemetery; Washington, D.C., U.S.
- Party: Democratic
- Spouse: Alice Stanley (m. 1917)
- Children: 3, including David
- Education: Yale University (BA); Harvard University (LLB)

Military service
- Allegiance: United States
- Branch/service: National Guard
- Battles/wars: World War I Operation Valuable

Dean Gooderham Acheson (/ˈætʃɪsən/ ATCH-iss-ən; April 11, 1893 – October 12, 1971) was an American politician and lawyer. As the 51st U.S. secretary of state, he set the foreign policy of the Harry S. Truman administration from 1949 to 1953. He was also Truman's main foreign policy advisor from 1945 to 1947 during early years of the Cold War. Acheson helped design the Truman Doctrine and the Marshall Plan, as well as the North Atlantic Treaty Organization. He was in private law practice from July 1947 to December 1948.

After 1949, Acheson came under political attack from Republicans led by Senator Joseph McCarthy over Truman's policy toward the People's Republic of China. During the Cuban Missile Crisis of 1962, President John F. Kennedy called upon Acheson for advice, bringing him into the executive committee (ExComm), a strategic advisory group. As a private citizen in 1968, he counseled President Lyndon B. Johnson to negotiate for peace with North Vietnam.

== Early life and education ==
Dean Gooderham Acheson was born in Middletown, Connecticut, on April 11, 1893. His father, Edward Campion Acheson, was an English-born Canadian (immigrated to Canada in 1881) who became a Church of England priest after graduating from Wycliffe College, and later a bishop of the Episcopal Church. He moved to the U.S., eventually becoming Bishop of Connecticut. His mother, Eleanor Gertrude (Gooderham), was a Canadian-born descendant of William Gooderham, Sr. (1790–1881), a founder of the Gooderham and Worts Distillery of Toronto. Like his father, Acheson was a staunch Democrat and opponent of prohibition.

Acheson attended Groton School and Yale College (1912–1915), where he joined Scroll and Key Society, was elected to Phi Beta Kappa, and was a brother of the Delta Kappa Epsilon fraternity (Phi chapter). In 1911, upon graduating from Groton and prior to entering Yale, he obtained a summer job with a work crew on the Grand Trunk Pacific Railway through family connections; during this period, his co-workers instilled in him "a priceless possession, joy in life." At Groton and Yale he had the reputation of a partier and prankster; he was somewhat aloof but still popular with his classmates; his friends included Cole Porter and Archibald MacLeish. Acheson's well-known, reputed arrogance—he disdained the curriculum at Yale because it focused on memorizing subjects already known—was apparent early. At Harvard Law School from 1915 to 1918, however, he was swept away by the intellect of professor Felix Frankfurter and finished fifth in his class.

== Personal life ==
On May 15, 1917, while serving in the National Guard, Acheson married Alice Caroline Stanley (August 12, 1895 – January 20, 1996). She loved painting and politics and served as a stabilizing influence throughout their enduring marriage; they had three children: David Campion Acheson, (father of Eleanor D. Acheson), Jane Acheson Brown and Mary Eleanor Acheson Bundy, (wife of William Bundy).

== Career ==
Supreme Court Justice Louis Brandeis had begun a new tradition of bright law students clerking for the U.S. Supreme Court justices. Acheson clerked for him for two terms from 1919 to 1921. Frankfurter and Brandeis were close associates, and future Supreme Court Justice Frankfurter suggested that Brandeis take on Acheson. Throughout his long career, Acheson displayed:

exceptional intellectual power and purpose, and tough inner fiber. He projected the long lines and aristocratic bearing of the thoroughbred horse, a self-assured grace, an acerbic elegance of mind, and a charm whose chief attraction was perhaps its penetrating candor....[He] was swift-flowing and direct.... Acheson was perceived as an 18th century rationalist ready to apply an irreverent wit to matters public and private.

=== Economic diplomacy ===
A lifelong Democrat, Acheson worked at a law firm in Washington, Covington & Burling, often dealing with international legal issues before Franklin Delano Roosevelt appointed him Undersecretary of the Treasury in March 1933. When Secretary William H. Woodin fell ill, Acheson suddenly found himself acting secretary despite his ignorance of finance. Because of his opposition to FDR's plan to deflate the dollar by controlling gold prices (thus creating inflation), he was forced to resign in November 1933. He resumed his law practice.

=== World War II ===
Brought back as assistant secretary of state on February 1, 1941, Acheson implemented much of Roosevelt's economic policy of aiding Great Britain and harming the Axis powers. Acheson implemented the Lend-Lease policy that helped re-arm Great Britain and the American/British/Dutch oil embargo that cut off 95 percent of Japanese oil supplies and escalated the crisis with Japan in 1941. Roosevelt froze all Japanese assets merely to disconcert them. He did not intend the flow of oil to Japan to cease. The president then departed Washington for Newfoundland to meet with Churchill. While he was gone Acheson used those frozen assets to deny Japan oil. Upon the president's return, he decided it would appear weak and appeasing to reverse the de facto oil embargo.

In 1944, Acheson attended the Bretton Woods Conference as the head delegate from the State Department. At this conference the post-war international economic structure was designed. It was the birthplace of the International Monetary Fund, the World Bank, and the General Agreement on Tariffs and Trade, the last of which would evolve into the World Trade Organization.

=== Cold War diplomacy ===
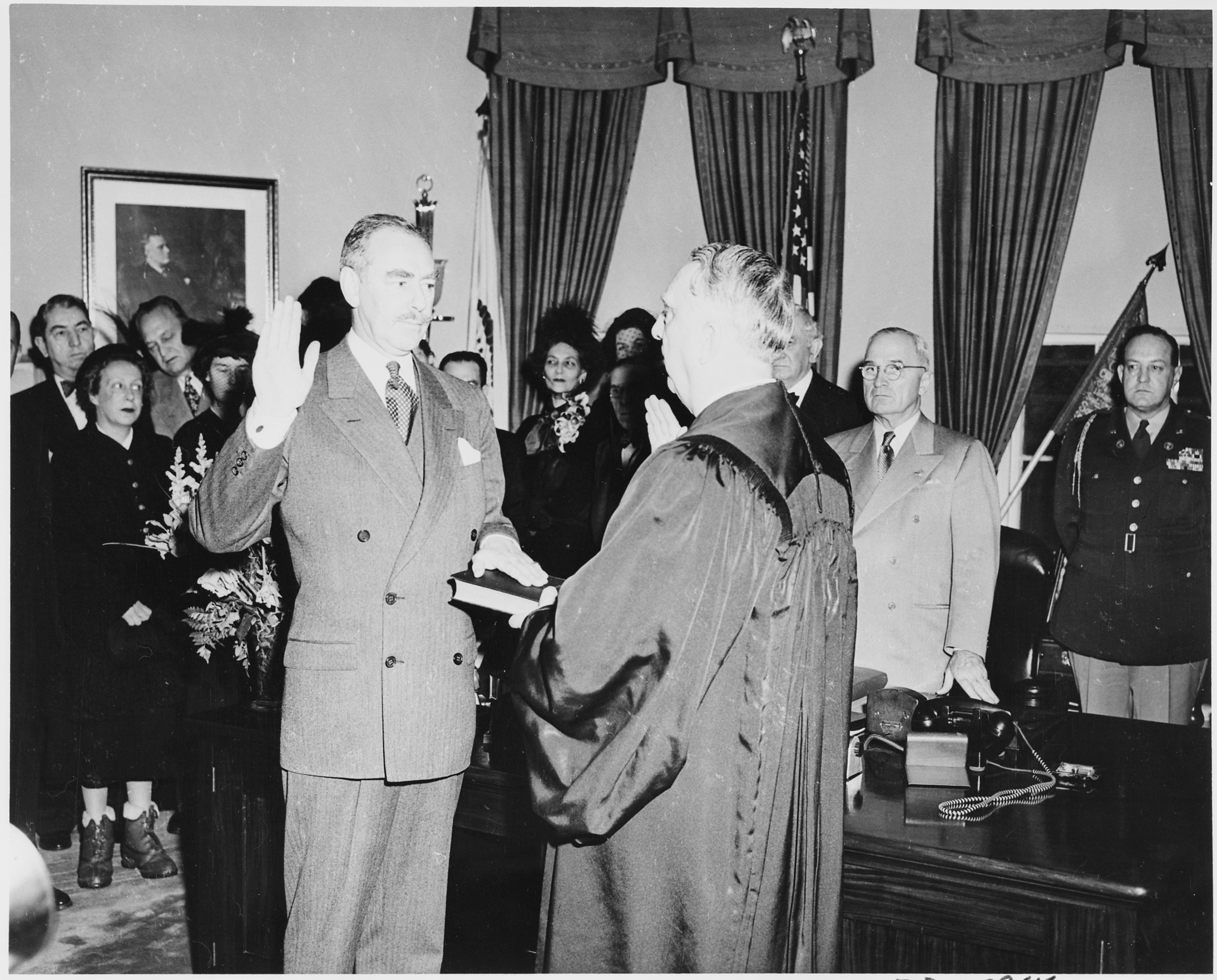
Acheson sworn into office as Secretary of State, by Chief Justice Fred M. Vinson, (January 21, 1949)

Later in 1945, Harry S. Truman selected Acheson as the Undersecretary of the United States Department of State; he retained this position working under Secretaries of State Edward Stettinius, Jr., James F. Byrnes, and George Marshall. As late as 1946 Acheson sought détente with the Soviet Union. In 1946, as chairman of a special committee to prepare a plan for the international control of atomic energy, he wrote the Acheson–Lilienthal report. At first Acheson was conciliatory towards Joseph Stalin.

The Soviet Union's attempts at regional hegemony in Eastern Europe and in Turkey and Iran changed Acheson's thinking. From this point forward, one historian writes, "Acheson was more than 'present at the creation' of the Cold War; he was a primary architect." Acheson often was acting secretary during the secretary's frequent overseas trips, and during this period he cemented a close relationship with President Truman. Acheson devised the policy and wrote Truman's 1947 request to Congress for aid to Greece and Turkey, a speech which stressed the dangers of totalitarianism (but did not name the Soviet Union) and marked the fundamental change in American foreign policy that became known as the Truman Doctrine. On June 30, 1947, Acheson received the Medal for Merit from President Truman.

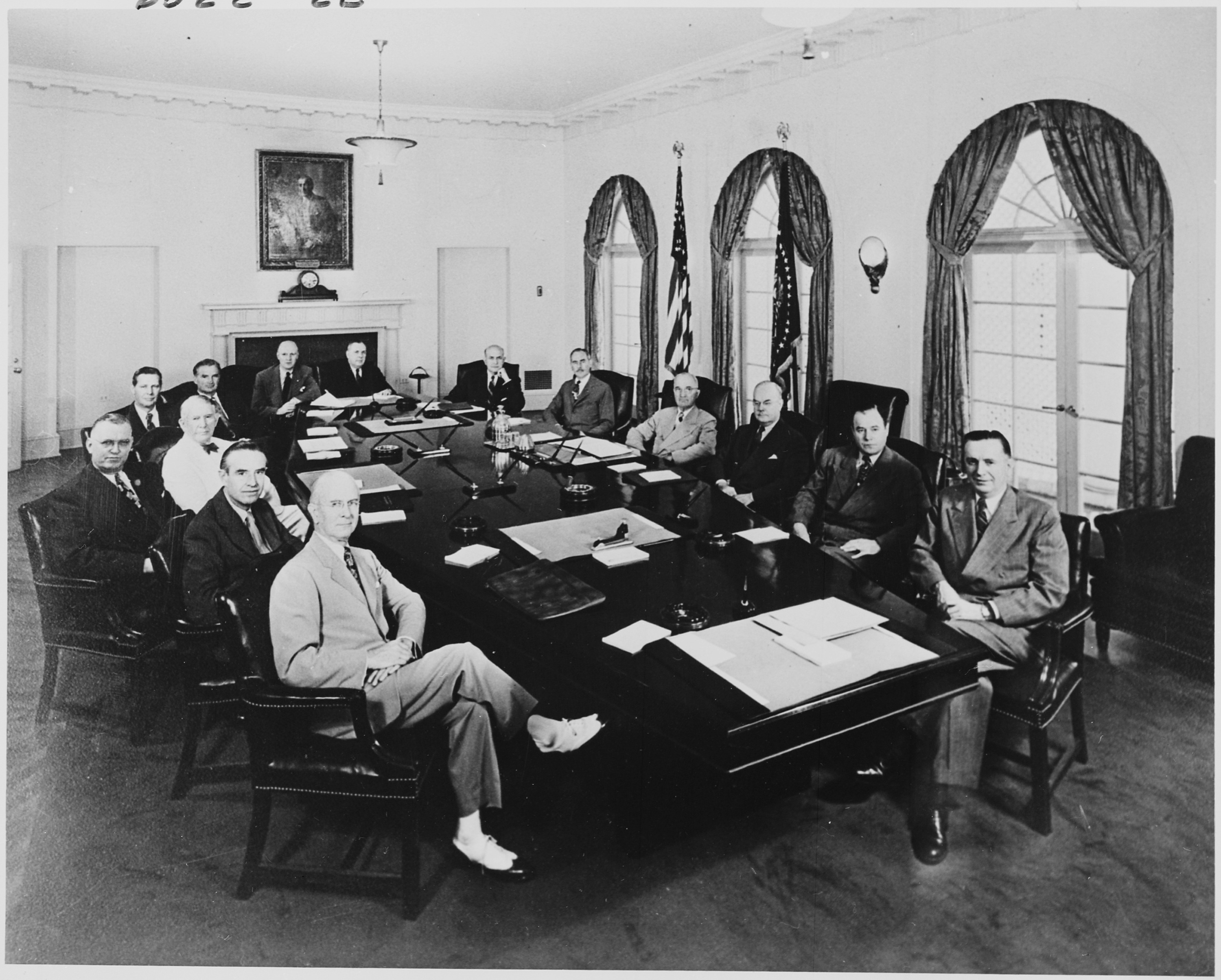
Acheson (fifth from right) as Secretary of State at a meeting of the Truman cabinet, August 25, 1950; President Truman is fourth from right

=== The White Paper Defense ===
During the summer of 1949, after the unexpected Democratic victory in the 1948 elections did not quiet the question "Who Lost China?", Acheson had the State Department produce a study of recent Sino-American relations. The document known officially as United States Relations with China with Special Reference to the Period 1944–1949, which later was simply called the China White Paper, attempted to dismiss any misinterpretations of Chinese and American diplomacy toward each other. Published during the height of Mao Zedong's takeover, the 1,054-page document argued that American intervention in China was doomed to failure. Although Acheson and Truman had hoped that the study would dispel rumors and conjecture, the documents helped to convince many critics that the administration had indeed failed to check the spread of communism in China.

=== Korean War ===
Acheson's speech on January 12, 1950, before the National Press Club did not mention the Korea Peninsula and Formosa (Taiwan) as part of the all-important "defense perimeter" of the United States, known as the Acheson Line. Since the war in Korea broke out on June 25, just a few months later, critics, especially in South Korea, took Acheson's statements to mean that the United States support for the new Syngman Rhee government in South Korea would be limited and that the speech provided Stalin and Kim Il Sung with a "green light" to believe the U.S. would not intervene if they invaded the South. When Soviet archives opened in the 1980s, however, research found that the speech had little if any impact on Communist decision for war in Korea.

=== Menon cabal and the "end of easy and automatic relations" ===
Acheson's advocacy of foreign policy discomfited many traditional American allies, who banded together with India's de facto foreign minister Krishna Menon, in what Acheson named at the time and again in his memoirs as the "Menon cabal". Members of the cabal included Anthony Eden and Selwyn Lloyd from Britain; R. G. Casey of Australia; and Lester B. Pearson of Canada, who famously observed in 1951 that "the days of easy and automatic relations with the United States are over'. The Menon cabal would frustrate Acheson's Korean War diplomatic policy, and remained a force beyond Acheson's tenure as Secretary of State, while Acheson's vituperative description of the cabal's diplomatic efforts as 'sophistries' by Menon and Pearson personally wounded Pearson, who would go on to become Prime Minister of Canada.

=== The "loss of China" attacks ===
With the Communist victory in the Chinese Civil war, China switched from a close friend of the U.S. to a bitter enemy—the two powers were at war in Korea by 1950. Critics blamed Acheson for what they called the "loss of China" and launched several years of organized opposition to Acheson's tenure; Acheson ridiculed his opponents and called this period in his outspoken memoirs The Attack of the Primitives. Although he maintained his role as a firm anti-communist, he was attacked by various anti-communists for not taking a more active role in attacking communism abroad and domestically, rather than hew to his policy of containment of communist expansion. Both he and Secretary of Defense George Marshall came under attack from men such as Joseph McCarthy; Acheson became a byword to some Americans, who tried to equate containment with appeasement. Congressman Richard Nixon, who later as president would call on Acheson for advice, ridiculed "Acheson's College of Cowardly Communist Containment". This criticism grew very loud after Acheson refused to "turn his back on Alger Hiss" when the latter was accused of being a Communist spy, and convicted of perjury for denying he was a spy.

== Later life and death ==
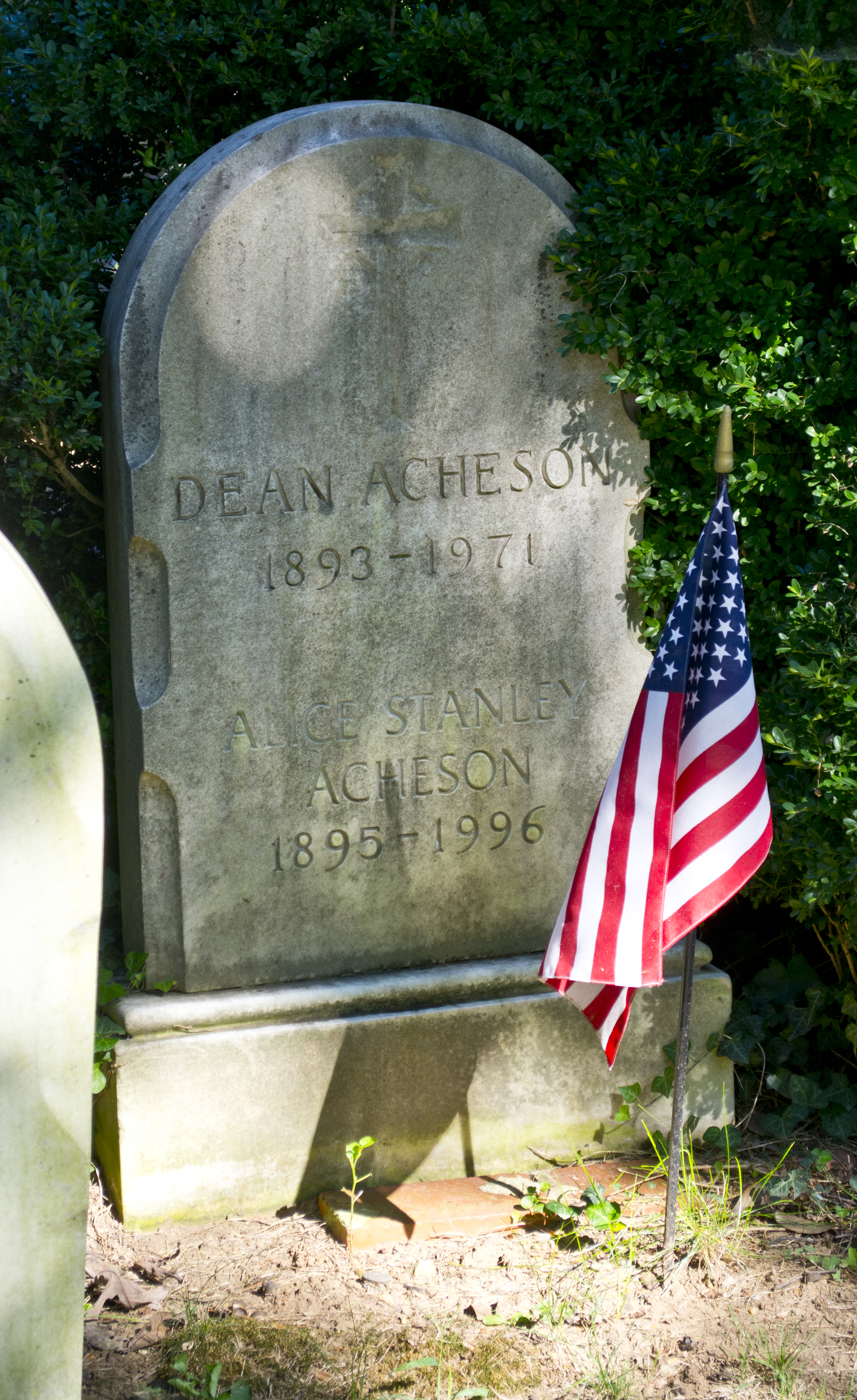
The gravesite of Dean Acheson in Oak Hill Cemetery

Acheson retired on January 20, 1953, the last day of the Truman administration, and served on Yale's governing board along with Senator Robert A. Taft, one of his sharpest critics. He was elected a Fellow of the American Academy of Arts and Sciences in 1955. Acheson returned to his private law practice. Although his official governmental career was over, his influence was not. He was ignored by the Eisenhower administration but headed up Democratic policy groups in the late 1950s. Much of President John F. Kennedy's flexible response policies came from the position papers drawn up by this group.

Acheson's law offices were strategically located a few blocks from the White House and he accomplished much out of office. He became an unofficial advisor to the Kennedy and Johnson administrations. During the Cuban Missile Crisis, for example, he was dispatched by Kennedy to France to brief French President Charles de Gaulle and gain his support for the United States blockade. Acheson so strongly opposed the final decision merely to blockade that he resigned from the executive committee.

During the 1960s, Acheson was a leading member of a bipartisan group of establishment elders known as the Wise Men, who initially supported the Vietnam War. As secretary of state, Acheson had supported the French efforts to control Indochina as the necessary price for French support of NATO, and to contain communism. By 1968, however, his viewpoint had changed. President Johnson asked Acheson to reassess American military policy, and he concluded that military victory was impossible. He advised Johnson to pull out as quickly as possible, to avoid a deepening division inside the Democratic Party. Johnson took Acheson's advice, in terms of de-escalating the war, and deciding not to run for reelection. Acheson distrusted Hubert Humphrey, and supported Richard Nixon for president in 1968. He provided advice to the Nixon administration through Henry Kissinger, focusing on NATO and on African affairs. He broke with Nixon in 1970 with the incursion into Cambodia.

In 1964, Acheson received the Presidential Medal of Freedom, with Distinction. In 1970, he won the Pulitzer Prize for History for his memoirs of his tenure in the State Department, Present at the Creation: My Years in the State Department. The Modern Library placed the book at No. 47 on its top 100 non-fiction books of the 20th century. Acheson died of a massive stroke at his farm in Sandy Spring, Maryland on October 12, 1971, at the age of 78. He was found slumped over his desk in his study. Acheson was interred in Oak Hill Cemetery in Georgetown, Washington, D.C.

== In media ==
Acheson was portrayed by John Dehner in the 1974 television docudrama, The Missiles of October. In the 2000 film Thirteen Days, Acheson was played by Len Cariou.

== Publications ==
=== Books ===
Present at the Creation: My Years in the State Department (W.W. Norton, 1969), Acheson's memoir, won the 1970 Pulitzer Prize for History.

- Acheson, Dean. A Democrat Looks at His Party (1955)
- Acheson, Dean. A Citizen Looks at Congress (1957)
- Acheson, Dean. Sketches from Life of Men I Have Known (1961)
- Acheson, Dean (1965). Morning and Noon: A Memoir. Boston: Houghton Mifflin Company.
- Acheson, Dean. Present at the Creation (1969) online
- Acheson, Dean. The Korean War (1971)
- Acheson, Dean (1971). Fragments of My Fleece. New York: Norton. ISBN 9780393086447. 222 pages.
- Acheson, Dean. Grapes from Thorns (1972)
- Acheson, Dean. This Vast External Realm (1973) – Posthumous collection of articles and speeches.
- McLellan, David S., and David C. Acheson, eds. Among Friends: Personal Letters of Dean Acheson (1980)
- Truman, Harry S. and Dean Acheson. Affection and trust: the personal correspondence of Harry S. Truman and Dean Acheson, 1953–1971 (2010)

=== Articles ===
- “Summary of Attorney General’s Committee Report”. American Bar Association Journal, Vol. 27, No. 3 (March 1941), pp. 143–146.
- “Mr. Justice Brandeis”. Harvard Law Review, Vol. 55, No. 2 (December 1941), pp. 191–192.
- “Text of the United States Note to the Soviet Union concerning the Question of the Turkish Straits, August 19, 1946”. Middle East Journal, Vol. 1, No. 1 (January 1947), pp. 88–89.
- “Statement on India by Dean Acheson, Acting U. S. Secretary of State, December 3, 1946”. Middle East Journal, Vol. 1, No. 2 (April 1947), p. 209.
- “The Need and the Lack”. The American Scholar, Vol. 17, No. 4 (Autumn 1948), pp. 476–477.
- “Abwehr von Aggressionen”. Ost-Probleme, Vol. 2, No. 39 (September 28, 1950), p. 1240.
- “Proklamation des Nationalen Notstands in USA”. Ost-Probleme, Vol. 3, No. 1 (January 6, 1951), p. 31. Coauthored with Harry S. Truman.
- “The Development of the International Community.” Proceedings of the American Society of International Law at Its Annual Meeting (1921–1969), Vol. 46 (April 24–26, 1952), pp. 18–25.
- “The Illusion of Disengagement”. Foreign Affairs, Vol. 36, No. 3 (April 1958), pp. 371–382.
- “Felix Frankfurter”. Harvard Law Review, Vol. 76, No. 1 (November 1962), pp. 14–16.
- “The Practice of Partnership”. Foreign Affairs, Vol. 41, No. 2 (January 1963), pp. 247–260.
- “The Cuban Quarantine”. Proceedings of the American Society of International Law at Its Annual Meeting (1921–1969), Vol. 57, Law and Conflict: Changing Patterns and Contemporary Challenges (April 25–27, 1963), pp. 9–18. Co-authored by Quincy Wright & Abram Chayes.
- “Europe: Decision or Drift”. Foreign Affairs, Vol. 44, No. 2 (January 1966), pp. 198–205.
- “The Lawyer’s Path to Peace”. The Virginia Quarterly Review, Vol. 42, No. 3 (Summer 1966), pp. 337–348.
- “The Arrogance of International Lawyers”. The International Lawyer, Vol. 2, No. 4 (July 1968), pp. 591–600.
- “Removing the Shadow Cast on the Courts”. American Bar Association Journal, Vol. 55, No. 10 (October 1969), pp. 919–922.
- “The Eclipse of the State Department”. Foreign Affairs, Vol. 49, No. 4 (July 1971), pp. 593–606.
- “How Containment Worked”. Foreign Policy, No. 7 (Summer 1972), pp. 41–53. Co-authored with Chalmers M. Roberts, W. Averell Harriman & Arthur Krock.

=== Book reviews ===
- “Review of The Labor Law of Maryland, by Malcolm H. Lauchheimer”. Harvard Law Review, Vol. 33, No. 2 (December 1919), pp. 329–332. Full text available on JSTOR.
- “Review of Shaping the Future: Foreign Policy in an Age of Transition, by Robert R. Bowie”. Political Science Quarterly, Vol. 79, No. 3 (September 1964), pp. 435–436.

Political offices
New office	Assistant Secretary of State for Congressional Relations and International Conferences; 1944–1945	Succeeded by Ernest A. Gross as Assistant Secretary of State for Legislative Affairs
New office	Assistant Secretary of State for Congressional Relations and International Conferences; 1944–1945	Succeeded by Dean Rusk as Assistant Secretary of State for International Organization Affairs
Preceded by Joseph Grew	United States Under Secretary of State; 1945–1947	Succeeded by Robert A. Lovett
Preceded by George Marshall	United States Secretary of State; 1949–1953	Succeeded by John Foster Dulles
