= The Middle East Journal =

- Discipline: Middle Eastern studies
- Language: English
- Edited by: Jacob Passel

Publication details
- History: 1947–present
- Publisher: Middle East Institute (United States)
- Frequency: Quarterly
- Impact factor: 0.605 (2015)

Standard abbreviations
- ISO 4: Middle East J.

Indexing
- ISSN: 0026-3141 (print); 1940-3461 (web)
- LCCN: 48002240
- JSTOR: 00263141
- OCLC no.: 1607025

Links
- Journal homepage; Online archive

The Middle East Journal is a quarterly peer-reviewed academic journal published by the Middle East Institute (Washington, D.C.). It was established in 1947 and covers research on the modern Middle East, including political, economic, and social developments and historical events in North Africa, the Middle East, Caucasus, and Central Asia. Jacob Passel is the current editor.

== History ==
The Middle East Institute was founded in 1946 with a stated objective to promote the study of the region in a modern, policy-relevant context. One of its priorities was "[t]he editing and publishing of an authoritative journal on Middle Eastern affairs." The first issue of the journal appeared in January 1947.

=== Past Editors ===
- Harvey P. Hall, 1947–1956.
- William Sands, 1956–1980.
- Richard B. Parker, 1981–1987.
- Jean Newsom, 1987–1990.
- Christopher Van Hollen Sr., 1990–1992.
- Eric Hooglund, 1992–1994.
- Mary-Jane Deeb, 1995–1998.
- Michael Collins Dunn, 1998–2018.

=== Current Contributors ===
Jacob Passel is the current editor. The current Book Review Editor is John Calabrese.

The Board of Advisory Editors include:

- Madawi Al-Rasheed
- Omar Ashour
- Henri Barkey
- Sheila Carapico
- Michael Collins Dunn
- Anoush Ehteshami
- Jean-Pierre Filiu
- F. Gregory Gause, III
- Michael M. Gunter
- Steven Heydemann
- J. N. C. Hill
- Frederic C. Hof
- Marc Lynch
- J. E. Peterson
- Michael W. S. Ryan
- Sabri Sayarı
- Samer S. Shehata
- Gareth Stansfield
- Robert Springborg
- Gönül Tol
- Edward (Ned) Walker
- Marvin G. Weinbaum
- Paul Salem
- Ross Harrison

== Abstracting and indexing ==
The journal is abstracted and indexed in the Book Review Index, Current Contents/Social & Behavioral Sciences, EBSCO databases, Index Islamicus, International Political Science Abstracts, ProQuest databases, Scopus, and the Social Sciences Citation Index. According to the Journal Citation Reports, the journal has a 2015 impact factor of 0.605.
