= Mary-Jane Deeb =

American Middle East expert, librarian and novelist

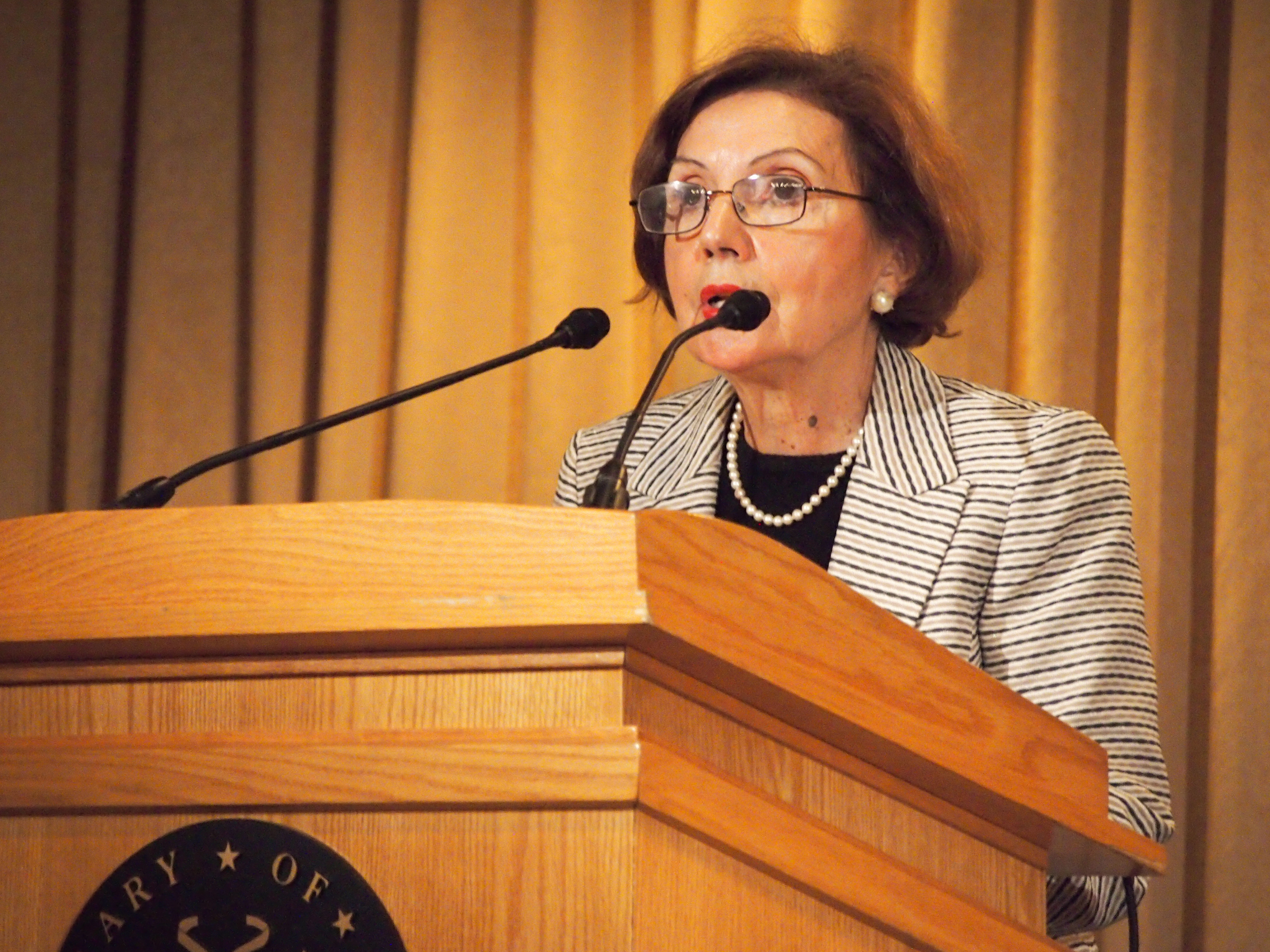
Mary-jane Deeb reading at the Library of Congress

Mary-Jane Deeb is an American Middle East expert, librarian and novelist. Deeb worked at the Library of Congress, where she succeeded George Atiyeh as Chief of the African and Middle Eastern Division.

== Life ==
Deeb's mother was Slovenian and her father was a Levantine from Egypt. She grew up in Alexandria, where she spoke French at home and English at a school run by Irish nuns.

Deeb gained her MA from the American University in Cairo in 1972, with a thesis on the Khazin family. She gained her doctorate at the Paul H. Nitze School of Advanced International Studies at Johns Hopkins University. She then taught for a decade at the American University in Washington, and was Director of the Omani Program there. During the Lebanese Civil War she spent four years in Beirut, working for international organizations including the United Nations Economic Commission for Western Asia, the United Nations International Children's Emergency Fund (UNICEF), America-Mideast Educational and Training Services, Inc. (AMIDEAST), and the US Agency for International Development.

From 1995 to 1998, Deeb was editor-in-chief of The Middle East Journal. She was also director of the Algeria Working Group at The Corporate Council on Africa. She was a UN observer for the 1997 Algerian parliamentary election.

In 1998, Deeb joined the Library of Congress as Arab World Area Specialist. She became Head of the Near East Section, and in 2005 became Chief of the African and Middle Eastern Division (AMED). She retired from the Library of Congress in February 2019.

== Works ==
=== Non-fiction ===
- (with Marius K. Deeb) Libya since the revolution : aspects of social and political development. Praeger, 1982. ISBN 978-0275907808
- 'Militant Islam and the Politics of Redemption', Annals of American Academy of Political and Social Sciences, No. 524 (Nov. 1992)
- (ed. with Mary E. King) Hasib Sabbagh: from Palestinian refugee to citizen of the world. Lanham, Md. : Middle East Institute/University Press of America, 1996.

=== Novels ===
- Cocktails and Murder on the Potomac. [Philadelphia] : Xlibris Corp., 2000.
- Murder on the Riviera. Brewster, Mass. : Paraclete Press, 2004.
- A Christmas Mystery in Provence. Brewster, Mass. : Paraclete Press, 2004.
- Death of a Harlequin. North Charleston, SC : CreateSpace, 2012.
