= Present at the Creation =

1969 book by Dean Acheson

Present at the Creation: My Years in the State Department
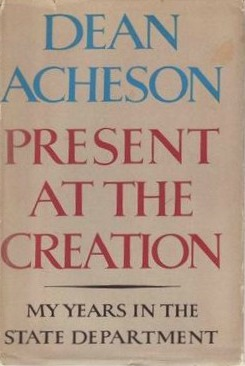
- First edition
- Author: Dean Acheson
- Genre: history
- Publisher: W.W. Norton
- Publication date: 1969
- Publication place: US
- Pages: 798
- Awards: Pulitzer Prize for History
- ISBN: 9780393304121

Present at the Creation: My Years in the State Department is a memoir by US Secretary of State Dean Acheson, published by W. W. Norton in 1969, which won the 1970 Pulitzer Prize for History. Acheson explained the title: Following World War II, the US administration faced a task "just a bit less formidable than that described in the first chapter of Genesis: That was to create a world out of chaos; ours, to create half a world, a free half, out of the same material without blowing the whole to pieces in the process."

The book opens with 13 chapters on Acheson's role as Assistant Secretary of State, 1941 to 1945. Chapters 14 through 27 cover his years as Under Secretary of State, 1945 to 1947. He was out of government service 1947 to 1949. The main text, chapters 28 through 75, cover his role as Secretary of State,1949 to 1953. The book provides a detailed insider account of how the State Department, emerged from its partnership with the Soviet Union against Nazi Germany and Japan. He emphasizes how the State Department, under President Harry Truman's leadership, played decisive roles in creating the international system that defined the Cold War era. He covers the founding of key institutions and policies, such as the United Nations, the Marshall Plan, the Truman Doctrine, Berlin Blockade, NATO, McCarthyism, and the Korean War, explaining how these were responses to the devastation of Europe, the rising threat of the Soviet Union as it took control of Eastern Europe and promoted communism in China and Korea. Acheson helped design the much needed new global architecture under American leadership.

Acheson gives an extensive account of the impact of McCarthyism and partisan attacks that damaged foreign policy and hurt the State Department, offering lessons on the dangers of political extremism. McCarthyism was gone by the time the book appeared in 1969, but now there were bitter debates escalating among students and intellectuals about the folly of the ongoing war in Vietnam, and indeed the wisdom of the Cold War itself. Acheson is candid about the early failures of U.S. policy in Indochina (Vietnam). He admits that he and the top American policymakers struggled to find viable alternatives and were hampered by ignorance of the Southeast Asia and the need to maintain the alliance with France. Historian Wilson Miscamble argues that the book failed to slow rise of anti-war revisionism concerning the Cold War. Nevertheless he concludes that it still stands up well in its in-depth coverage of the origins of the Cold War. Despite its length and density, the memoir was widely praised by scholars for its wit, vivid anecdotes, and clear prose that made complex events accessible and compelling.
