= Menon cabal =

Group supporting ideas of VK Menon

The Menon cabal was a small group of senior statesmen from Commonwealth realms active in world diplomacy after 1947. They aligned with India's V. K. Krishna Menon in international affairs, seeking pragmatic approaches to diplomatic problems in lieu of more full-throated support for preferred American policy.

The term was initially coined by U.S. Secretary of State Dean Acheson in reference to developments during the prisoner-of-war-repatriation component of the Korean Armistice Agreement negotiations. Menon offered a plan that would ultimately prove successful in relative secrecy from US diplomats, but with the support of Commonwealth diplomats. By using the term 'cabal' Acheson openly alleged that Anthony Eden and Selwyn Lloyd of the United Kingdom, Mike Pearson and Paul Martin of Canada, and R. G. Casey of Australia were working with Menon. Acheson sought to disrupt the group via actions such as accosting the serving Canadian Prime Minister to undermine Pearson. This deepened the skepticism felt by many cabal-aligned diplomats about American foreign policy. Pearson notably remarked 'the days of easy and automatic relations (were over)', consolidating the inchoate 'cabal'.

The abrupt about-face in political alignments was striking; Menon built Quit India almost entirely via natives in Britain, aligning himself with Labour or even further Left. Yet in the 1950s Menon's idealistic friends from Labour were no longer so idealistic. MI5 document dumps later revealed that the option of assassinating Menon had been discussed; meanwhile, the amity from conservatives was genuine.

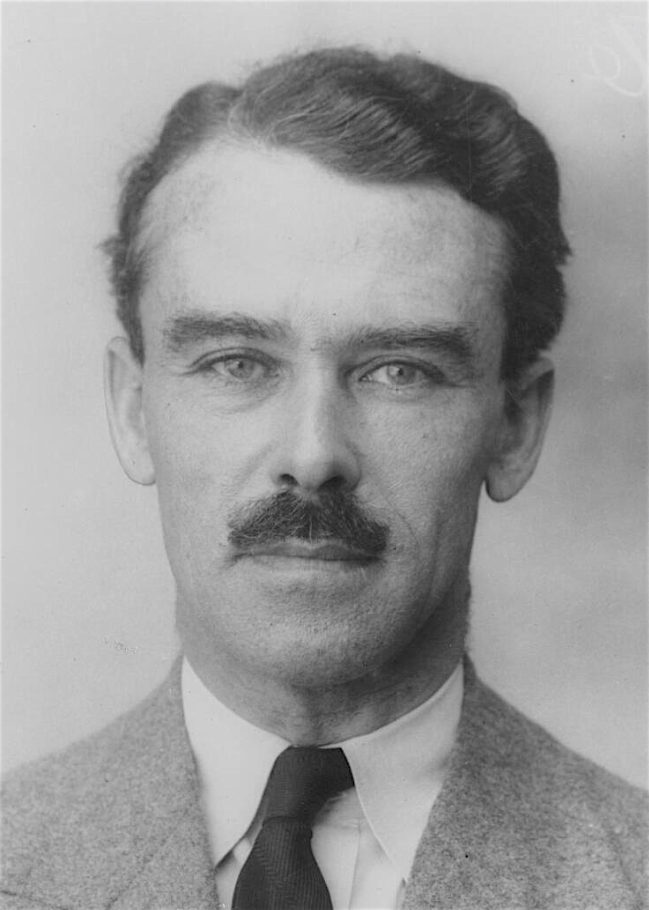
Richard Casey, Baron Casey -- reported that working with Menon and his bloc was often easier and more helpful. He would become Governor-General of Australia in 1965.

The Menon cabal continued to undertake international diplomacy through the 1950s. America failed to block Menon/India from participating in events or talks of diplomatic importance. For example, during the 1954 Geneva Conference, and the Suez Crisis, Menon was treated as a guest of honor, frequently at Eden's invitation.

Of the five original cabalists, four became their countries' respective heads of state or government: Eden as UK Prime Minister from 1955, Pearson and Martin as Prime Ministers of Canada from 1963 and 2002 respectively, and Lord Casey as Governor-General of Australia from 1965. Lloyd, the exception, became the United Kingdom's Chancellor of the Exchequer and then Speaker of the House of Commons. Menon himself became second only to Prime Minister Jawaharlal Nehru in his native India, and was widely viewed as his successor, ultimately serving as de jure Defence Minister in addition to de facto Foreign Minister. Pearson won the Nobel Peace Prize in 1957 for his cabal-guided efforts during the Suez Crisis, during which he was President of the United Nations General Assembly.
