= Michael Collins Dunn =

American academic (1947–2023)

- Born: Michael Collins Dunn; September 17, 1947
- Died: March 20, 2023 (aged 75); Northern Virginia, USA
- Occupation: Editor of academic journal
- Years active: 1998–2018
- Known for: Editing of the Middle East Journal

Academic background
- Education: Georgetown University
- Thesis: The Struggle for Abbasid Egypt (1981)

Academic work
- Discipline: History, Political Science
- Sub-discipline: Middle East Studies

Michael Collins Dunn (September 17, 1947 – March 20, 2023) was an American scholar specializing in the Egypt; security, military, and energy affairs; and Islam; and who served for two decades as editor of the Middle East Journal, primary and peer-reviewed academic journal on the Middle East, published by the Middle East Institute, as well at the bi-weekly newsletter The Estimate.

== Background ==
Michael Collins Dunn descended from Henry Collins (1795–1860). Dunn received his doctorate from Georgetown University, from which he also received his BA and MA. He wrote his thesis on the Mamluk Sultanate in Egypt.

== Career ==
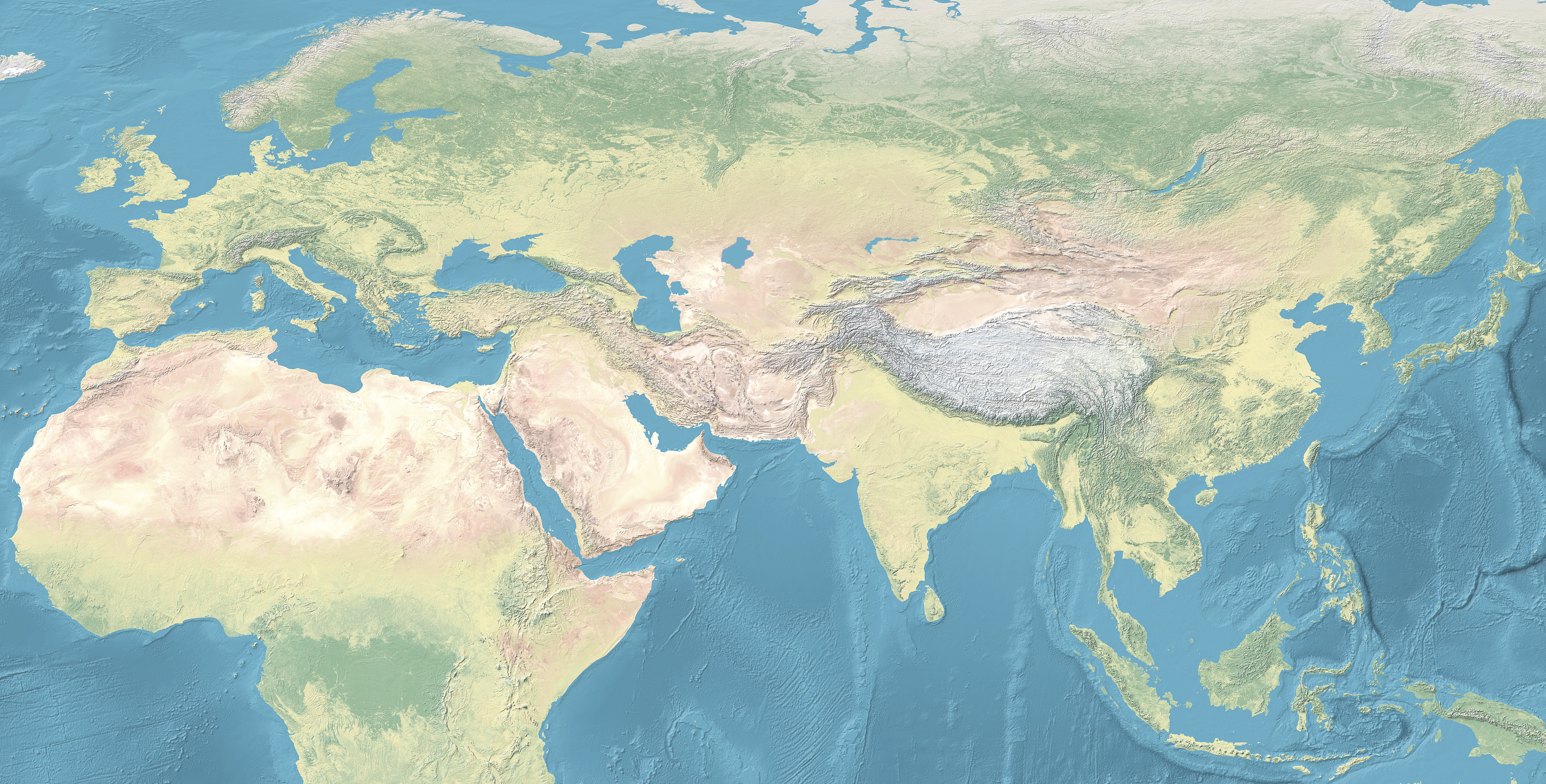
Dunn wrote his doctorate on the Mamluk Sultanate, shown here in a map of its contemporary polities c. 1300

Dunn was both an academic and a professional. As academic, he was a professor and lecturer at numerous universities, including Utah State University (1977–1978) and the Center for Contemporary Arab Studies in the Walsh School of Foreign Service at Georgetown University (1983–1991) . As professional, he consulted to oil and defense companies.

In 1981, Dunn started contributing more than a dozen book reviews to The Middle East Journal. In 1998, he became editor of this oldest, quarterly, peer-reviewed scholar publication about the Middle East in the United States.

In 1989, Dunn co-founded and ran The Estimate, a newsletter on political and security intelligence of the Middle East and East Asia, which occasionally published a four-page Dossier on specific topics through the mid-2010s.

As an expert, he spoke on the NBC Today Show, ABC News Nightline, PBS McNeil-Lehrer News Hour (PBS NewsHour, CBS Nightwatch, CNN, C-SPAN, and overseas television news (Dubai TV, CBS Telenoticias).

== Personal life and death ==
In 1993, Dunn married Tamar Ann Mehuron, who earned an MA in Middle East Studies from the University of London's School of Oriental and African Studies (SOAS). They have one child.

Dunn learned Classical, Qur'anic and Modern Standard Arabic, as well as Egyptian and Tunisian dialects. He also studied French, Spanish, German, Hebrew, and Persian.

Michael Collins Dunn died age 75 on March 20, 2023.

== Recognition ==
Upon his retirement in 2018, succeeding editor Jacob Passel wrote:

For nearly 20 years, Dr. Michael Collins Dunn had been at the helm of The Middle East Journal... Dr. Dunn arrived at the Middle Est Institute in 1998... He quickly became a repository for MEI's institutional memory... As Editor, Dr. Dunn was committed to what he saw as The Middle East Journal's identity: a venue for first-rate scholarship on the Middle East that simultaneously meets academic standards without being so esoteric as to be inaccessible to nonacademics, whether they are regionally-focused professionals, students, or lay readers. Dr. Dunn shepherded the Journal into the digital age by facilitation its availability on platforms like IngentaConnect, Project MUSE, and JSTOR--where it is read and used more wideley than it ever was in print.

Upon his death, the Middle East Institute stated:

His tenure as Editor saw the Journal shift from a print-only publication to being included in electronic library databases, where it is now read hundreds of thousands times annually. He was an exceptionally kind man with a vast knowledge of the region's history and cultures, which he always enjoyed sharing.

== Works ==
In addition to two decades of editing and publishing of scores of quarterly issues of The Middle East Journal (including an "Editor's Note" for every issue between Volume 53:1 Winter 1999 and Volume 72:1 Winter 2018), Dr. Dunn published books and articles.

=== Books ===
- The Struggle for Abbasid Egypt (1981)
- Tunisia's New Leadership (1988)
- Renaissance or radicalism ? Political islam. The case of Tunisia's al-Nahda (1992)

=== Chapters ===
- "The Arab World and the Kurds" in Kurdish Identity: Human Rights and Political Status (2007)
- "US Relations with Egypt: An Overview" in Handbook of US-Middle East Relations (2009)

=== Articles ===
- "The Wrong Place, the Wrong Time: Why Yemeni Unity Failed," Middle East Policy (June 1994)
- "Death of Samaritans' High Priest," Middle East Institute Editor's Blog (2010)
- "Coptic Church's Synod Recognizes Two Modern Saints," Middle East Journal, Editor's Blog (2013)
- "The Fall of Zaki Badr: A Victory for Egypt's Opposition Press," Washington Report (2013)
- "Military High-Tech," Journal of Palestine Studies (December 2020)

== External sources ==
- Michael Collins Dunn, Ph.D.
- Michael Collins Dunn
- Middle East Journal
- Middle East Institute's Editor's Blog 2009–2018)
