= Edwin M. Wright =

American foreign policy specialist (1897–1987)

Edwin Milton Wright (1897–1987) was an American foreign policy specialist. Employed by the U.S. State Department from 1945 to 1955 in a number of capacities, he was especially involved in the events leading up to and surrounding the establishment of Israel.

== Life ==
Wright was born in Tabriz, the son of American missionaries. Educated at Wooster College and Columbia University, he worked on refugee resettlement in Iraq from 1921 to 1924, and from 1924 until 1937 taught in American secondary schools in Iran. When World War II broke out, as one of the few Americans who could speak Persian he was recruited into US intelligence.

He served as a Middle East specialist for the U.S. State Department from 1945 to 1946; on the Bureau for Near East, South Asian, and African Affairs from 1946 to 1947; as an advisor on United Nations affairs from 1947 to 1950, and as an advisor on intelligence from 1950 to 1955.
