= Preston Crowmarsh =

Hamlet in Oxfordshire, England

Coordinates: 51.613°N 1.111°W

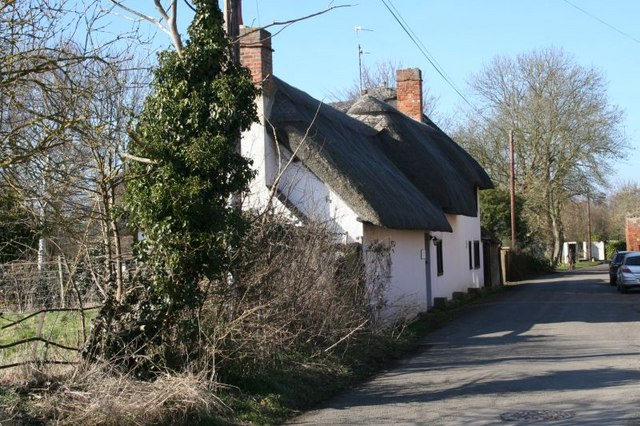
- Cottages in Preston Crowmarsh

- Location within Oxfordshire
- OS grid reference: SU616908
- Civil parish: Benson
- District: South Oxfordshire
- Shire county: Oxfordshire
- Region: South East
- Country: England
- Sovereign state: United Kingdom
- Post town: Wallingford
- Postcode district: OX10
- Dialling code: 01491
- Police: Thames Valley
- Fire: Oxfordshire
- Ambulance: South Central
- UK Parliament: Henley
- Website: Benson Parish Council

Preston Crowmarsh is a hamlet in Benson civil parish in South Oxfordshire. It is on the River Thames 1 mile (1.6 km) north of Wallingford. The river can be crossed on foot here at Benson Lock.
