= Middle East Institute =

US public policy think tank and cultural center

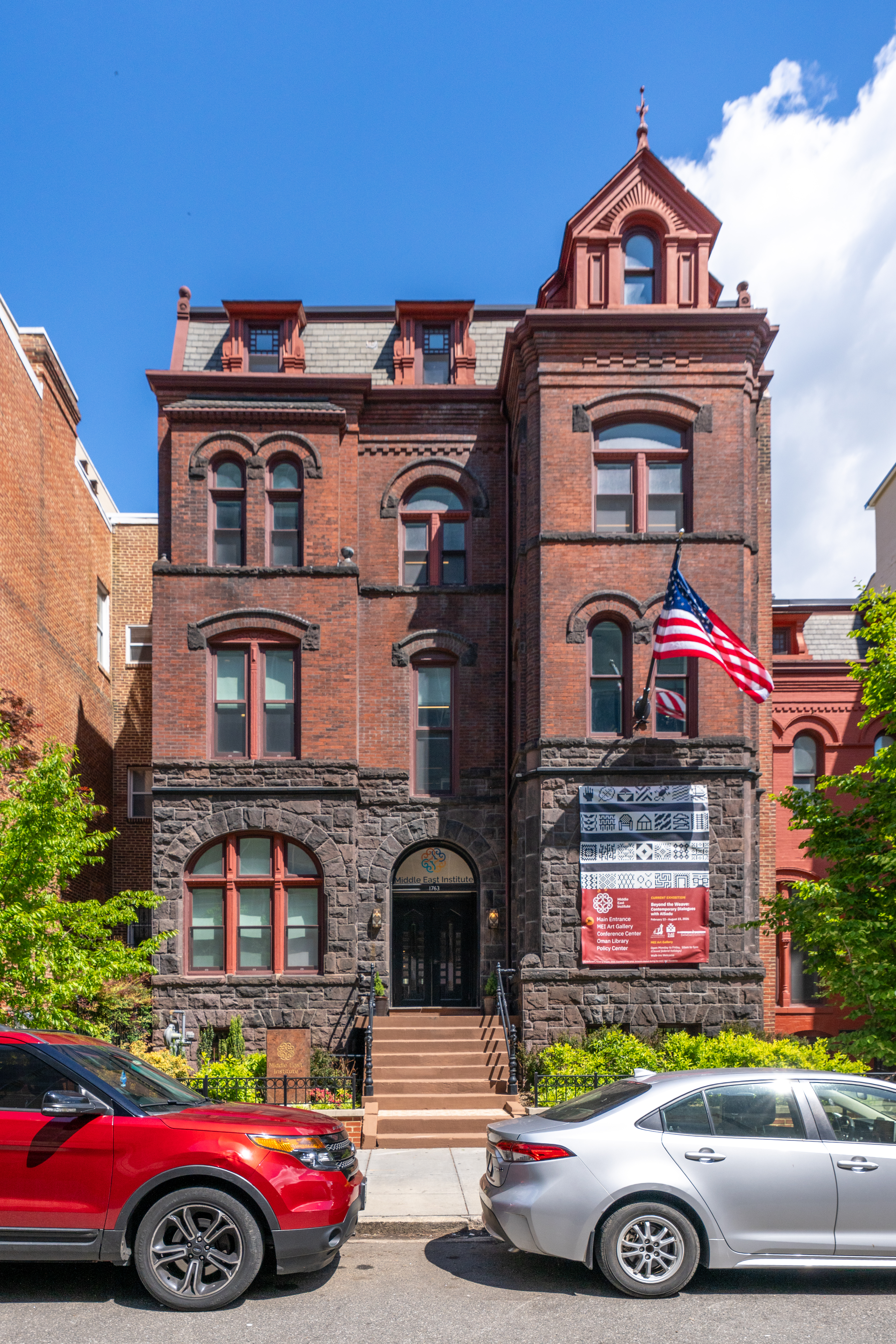
- The Middle East Institute near Dupont Circle in Washington, D.C.
- Abbreviation: MEI
- Formation: 1946
- Type: Public Policy Think Tank
- Headquarters: 1763 N St. NW (Washington, D.C.)
- Location: Washington, D.C.
- President: Amb. (ret.) Stuart E. Jones
- Board Chair: C. David Welch
- Revenue: $8,389,421 (2024)
- Employees: 42 (2022)
- Website: www.mei.edu

The Middle East Institute (MEI) is a non-profit, non-partisan think tank and cultural center in Washington, D.C., founded in 1946. Its stated objective is to "increase knowledge of the Middle East among the United States citizens and promote a better understanding between the people of these two areas." In 2024 around 40% of its funding came from governments of Persian Gulf countries.

== History ==
=== Founding years ===
In 1946, architect George Camp Keiser believed that the Middle East, a region he had traveled through prior to World War II, should be better understood in the United States, so he brought together a group of like-minded people to form the Middle East Institute in Washington, D.C.

The United States had not yet assumed an active role in Middle Eastern affairs. In anticipation of the role that it would have to play in the postwar world, the founders resolved that steps should be taken to develop an interest in the Middle East among the American people.

— Annual Report 1969, "Background on the Institute's history"

His colleagues on the original Board of Governors included Halford L. Hoskins, Director of the Johns Hopkins University School of Advanced International Studies (SAIS); Christian A. Herter, then-congressman from Massachusetts and later Dwight Eisenhower's Secretary of State; George V. Allen; Harold Glidden, Director of the Islamic Department at the Library of Congress; and Harvey P. Hall, the first Editor of the Middle East Journal, professor at the American University of Beirut and Robert College. Keiser was also MEI's chief source of financial support. In 1946, the Institute found a temporary home at 1906 Florida Avenue NW at SAIS. At the time, they were linked administratively through the Diplomatic Affairs Foundation, the parent organization of both SAIS and MEI.

In its early years, MEI concentrated on establishing a library, publishing the Middle East Journal, holding annual conferences and sponsoring formal courses in Middle East studies at SAIS. Keiser and his group recognized the need for studying the Middle East using the framework of area studies. This interdisciplinary approach to training diplomats and businesspeople was a new phenomenon and closely linked to foreign policy initiatives in the United States.

During its founding years, the institute was small, its membership resembling that of a club. The annual conference, held at the Friends Meeting House on Florida Avenue, brought together a close-knit group of approximately 150 people accustomed to writing short articles for the institute's newsletter to inform fellow members about their trips to the Middle East.

==== George Camp Keiser: founder of the Institute ====
George Camp Keiser was born on November 2, 1900, in Milwaukee, Wisconsin. After graduating from Harvard University with a Bachelor of Arts in 1924, he went to Columbia University to complete his graduate degree in architecture by 1930. Over the following years, he worked as a draftsman for David Hyer and James Gamble Rogers until he opened his own practice in 1938. Following his younger brother's career path, Keiser also became director of the Cuban-American Sugar Company and the Guantanamo Sugar Company.

George Keiser built his family home inspired by Islamic architecture, showcasing his fascination with the Middle East and Middle Eastern architecture in particular. In 1947, he founded the Middle East Institute.

During World War II, Keiser was a first lieutenant in the U.S. Signal Corps. Further positions held over the course of his life include trustee of the Foreign Service Educational Foundation, the American Research Center in Egypt, and the Visitors Committee of the Harvard Center for Middle Eastern Studies. He was also a member of the American Institute of Architects and president of the Symphony Orchestra of Central Florida. On March 23, 1956, he died after a brief illness and was buried in Wilton, Connecticut.

=== The 1950s ===
MEI created a language and a publications program; St John Philby's Arabian Highlands was published for MEI by Cornell University Press in 1952. MEI increased the number of lectures, art exhibits, and conferences. Themes of annual conferences like "The Evolution of Public Responsibility in the Middle East" (1955), "Current Tensions in the Middle East" (1956), and "Neutralism, Communism: The Struggle for Power" (1959) reflected the post-World War II uncertainties about the Middle East.

After having split from SAIS in 1948, MEI needed to find a new location. After spending a year at 2002 P Street, Keiser discovered and negotiated in late 1954 the purchase of two inter-connecting townhouses in the Dupont Circle neighbourhood at 1761–1763 N Street NW with a joint garden and carriage house. The house, formerly occupied by Senator James B. Eustis and by architect Henry Ives Cobb, is MEI's current location.

Keiser's death in 1956 triggered a period of re-evaluation. Edwin M. Wright took over as the second president until 1960, with Angus Sinclair briefly serving in 1958.

=== The 1960s ===
Following Keiser's death, MEI faced financial troubles. A series of part-time presidents including Edwin M. Wright, James Terry Duce, and Kermit Roosevelt, Jr., who all served in addition to their professional or business responsibilities, chiefly launched new projects with the hope that they would be self-supporting. Among these were Lands East, an illustrated magazine, and the Middle East Report of the Week, an "insiders" newsletter which was produced on a mimeograph machine.

By 1966, MEI realized it could not survive without full-time leadership. Raymond A. Hare stabilized the organization at a relatively low level of activity appropriate with its resources, concentrating on fundraising and expanding the base of corporate donations. As a result of these efforts, additional projects were financed by the Ford Foundation, a few conferences were organized for the U.S. Department of State, and the Rockefeller Foundation financed a series of discussion dinners. Georgetown University invited the institute to hold its annual conference there, providing free accommodations and volunteer staff.

In 1969, Parker T. Hart led MEI into renewed activity. His vision for MEI to become an important national player led to an increased number of programs (like an annual conference on Middle East Business) and partnerships across the country and the world, a new internship program for undergraduate and graduate students, renewal of the MEI language program, and the publication of the Middle East Problem Papers.

1971 MEI Logo

=== The 1970s ===
The 1970s were marked by an increased number of programs and events, many on the Cold War. Panels on Soviet Aims and Interests such as "The Arab–Israeli Conflict in View of the U.S.–Soviet Conflict" and "The Strategic and Political Dimensions on the Cold War" meant to provide the public with information.

The Middle East, for many years a source of fascination and concern to ... specialists has now assumed a greater and growing importance for Americans from all walks of life.

— Annual Report 1974, "Foreword"

MEI started a program called "Dialogue" in 1974 in cooperation with the Arabist Travel Program. It sent small teams of scholars and students to seven Arab countries. The program was repeated in 1978, funded by the United States Information Agency and the State Department.

MEI also introduced The Middle East Monitor, an insider newsletter, published between 1971 and 1975. Its logo is the source of MEI's current logo, which is adapted from the design on a 10th-century platter unearthed near Nishapur, Iran, and now in the collections of New York's Metropolitan Museum of Art.

=== The 1980s ===
Taking on the MEI president's role in 1975, L. Dean Brown served until 1986— the longest presidential tenure in MEI's history. Under Brown, MEI focused on business and investment opportunities between the Middle East and the United States. The 1980s also saw an increase in MEI's research and program ventures on issues like the theocracy of Iranian Islamic Clergy and Egyptian perceptions of the U.S. presence in Egypt.

After having already served a short term as MEI's president from 1974 to 1975, Lucius D. Battle returned from 1986 to 1990. Under his leadership, MEI absorbed the American Institute for Islamic Affairs (AIIA) functions, dedicated to the Sultan Qaboos bin Said Research Center, and its endowment. He and then-Vice President Christopher Van Hollen also began a tradition of traveling throughout the Middle East to gain support for MEI's mission.

=== The 1990s ===
MEI's agenda in the 1990s was shaped by persistent volatility in the Persian Gulf States, the Arab–Israeli peace process, women in the Arab world, and contentious U.S. foreign policy.

Robert Keeley succeeded Brown and served as president until 1995. During his tenure, MEI organized its first language-focused trip to the Middle East, set up a meeting between Israeli and Palestinian officials in Cairo, and renovated the building extensively.

The next man to assume this post was Roscoe S. Suddarth, who stayed on as president until 2001. During this time, the Foundation for Middle East Peace began renting space in the building (1996) and MEI celebrated its 50th anniversary. MEI established the Public Policy Center in 1999, bringing together MEI scholars-in-residence and adjunct scholars to provide commentaries on pressing issues in the Middle East.

=== The 2000s ===
Edward S. Walker, Jr., assumed the presidency in 2001 and left the post in 2006. Walker highlighted America's struggle with the Arab–Israeli conflict, the challenge of global terrorism, and the Iraq War. In 2007, Wendy Chamberlin became the first woman to hold this position. She was succeeded in 2018 by Paul Salem. In 2024, Paul stepped down from the presidency of MEI and assumed the role of Vice President for International Engagement. After he stepped down, Dr. Susan E. Saxton became and is currently the Interim President of MEI.

=== The 2010s ===
In July 2018, Wendy Chamberlin retired after serving nearly 12 years as president of the institute. Paul Salem, previously the organization's senior vice president, was appointed as the new president.

In September 2019 the organization moved back from its temporary housing at 18th St. NW to its headquarters at 1761 N St. NW after a two-year renovation. The institute was gifted $20M by the United Arab Emirates to fund the renovation.

== Organizational structure ==
=== Programs ===
The Middle East Institute hosts public events, which range from panel presentations and book signings to roundtables and policy workshops. MEI invites experts from the Middle East and around the world to participate in its programs and conferences. Its larger events include annual conferences on Turkey and Egypt and its main event of each year, the Annual Conference and Banquet, held in November.

=== Communications ===
The institute's roster of over 40 scholars is composed of former U.S. ambassadors, government officials, and academics, and analysts.

=== Publications ===
MEI publishes the quarterly Middle East Journal, MEI's only print publication. In addition to the Journal, analyses and opinion pieces are posted on the website. Additionally, the members-only bulletin @MEI is distributed on a regular basis.

==== The Middle East Journal ====
The Journal was first published in 1947, making it the oldest U.S. peer-reviewed publication on the modern Middle East.

Even though the American people may be suffering from a surfeit of periodical publications, no apology needs to be offered to add a quarterly journal relating to the Middle East. Except to a very few Americans—Foreign Service and Army officers, educators, businessmen, travelers—this area is essentially terra incognita. Such a circumstance was a matter of no great practical consequence when the world was large and only loosely knit together. Now that the Middle East is very near the United States in point of time-distance and almost equally near with respect to matters of concern in American foreign policy, it deserves such thoughtful attention as can be initiated and encouraged through the pages of The Middle East Journal.

In its early years, the Journal covered regional issues and history from the 19th and 20th centuries. However, in the 1980s, the Journal restricted its coverage to the post-World War II era. It now carries analyses of political, economic, and social developments as well as historical events in North Africa, the Middle East, the Caucasus, and Central Asia. Each issue features articles by scholars, book reviews, and a chronology of regional events organized by topic and country for each quarter. The policy of the Journal is to provide a forum that represents all views on issues facing the Middle East while maintaining a non-partisan stance. The current editor is Jacob Passel. His predecessor, Michael Collins Dunn, had been in this post since 1998.

=== The Oman Library ===
The library, originally named after MEI's founder George Camp Keiser, was created at MEI's founding in 1946 and is housed in an old carriage house behind MEI's main building. Following a major contribution by Qaboos bin Said al Said, the Sultan of Oman, the library was renamed as the Oman Library and completed a renovation of its facilities in 2013. The library comprises the largest collection of literature on the Middle East in Washington, D.C., outside of the Library of Congress and holds materials in regional languages. It is estimated to house over 20,000 books and periodicals, all devoted to the region. The library is open to the public for in-house use.

== Centers of Study ==
=== Center for Pakistan Studies ===
Founded in April 2009, the Center for Pakistan Studies aims to foster closer relations and increased understanding between Pakistan and the United States. While Pakistan is not part of the "traditional" Middle East, it was included in MEI's original definition of the region due to its strong ties to Middle Eastern countries as well as its connection with the United States.

The center's aims to facilitate scholarly exchange between Pakistanis and Americans. This forum includes a daily news feed as well as a collection of documents and publications from the U.S. government. The center's two main concerns are Pakistani news as well as longer-term issues like water, energy, and the Kashmir conflict. Marvin Weinbaum is the current Director of the Center for Pakistan Studies.

=== Center for Turkish Studies ===
MEI established the Center for Turkish Studies in Summer 2009 to promote increased knowledge and understanding of Turkish politics, economics, and society. The Center for Turkish Studies aims to also enhance understanding and dialogue between the United States and Turkey through providing a channel of communication for academic and policy circles. The founding head of MEI's Center for Turkish studies is Gönül Tol.

=== Sultan Qaboos Cultural Center (SQCC) ===
The Sultan Qaboos Cultural Center (SQCC) was established in 2005 following an agreement with the Sultanate of Oman. SQCC's establishment replaced the Sultan Qaboos bin Said Research Center for Middle East Studies, located at MEI since the mid-1980s. Kathleen Ridolfo, SQCC Executive Director, leads the center in its mission to educate Americans and Omanis about the two cultures. In 2011, SQCC opened a Cultural Center, which showcased Omani crafts and serves as a space for workshops and other events. In 2013, SQCC parted with MEI and relocated to new offices.

=== Middle East-Asia Project (MAP) ===
The Middle East-Asia Project (MAP) is an initiative to serve two objectives:

- To promote awareness and understanding of the multidimensional relations between the Middle East and Asia by providing information and analysis on cross-regional economic, political, security, and social/cultural interactions and their implications; and
- To foster collaborative research and other activities regarding Middle East-Asia relations through establishing an online community of experts and forging institutional partnerships.

The Cyber Library contains publication details, abstracts, and live links to full-text versions of previously published works on Middle East-Asian affairs organized by country and by topic/issue.

The Experts Directory contains the profiles and contact details of academics, business leaders, diplomats, journalists, researchers and other practitioners affiliated with the MAP.

The Infographics project element consists of periodically updated charts, tables, and timelines depicting key trends and developments in trade, investment, migration, and other spheres of cross-regional activity.

The Publications element is organized as follows:

Partner Content: refers to original works produced by MAP-affiliated experts for non-MEI outlets but made available to and posted to the MAP microsite in full-text format and later integrated into the Cyber Library.

New MAP Publications:

- Analysis: Short analytical essays (2,000 words) on key issues grouped under three main headings (i.e., politics/security, energy/commerce, and culture/society).
- Dialogues: Brief commentaries by two or more contributors (every 500 words) on specific cross-regional developments or viewed from cross-regional perspectives.
- Interviews: Online text-based conversations conducted with diplomats, businessmen, or others drawing upon their own cross-cultural experiences, as well as insights and observations about the evolution of Middle East-Asian relations.

=== Iran Program ===
MEI's Iran program covers Iranian domestic politics, civil society and social trends, and Tehran's soft- and hard-power approach to geopolitical competition with other regional states through research, articles, papers, and public and private events.

== Funding ==
The institute is a 501(c)(3) nonprofit organization and publishes a list of its annual donors on its website. In 2024 its largest contributors were the United Arab Emirates and the State of Qatar, in addition to other Gulf countries and fossil fuel and military companies.

In 2016 the organization was gifted $20M by the UAE-funded Emirates Center for Strategic Studies for the renovation of its historic headquarters at 1763 N Street NW.

== Executive leadership ==
- Amb. Stuart E. Jones: President
- Susan E. Saxton: Chief Operating Officer
- Rick Somarriba: Chief Financial Officer
- Kate Seelye: Vice President for Arts and Culture
