= Gareth Stansfield =

British academic (born 1973)

Gareth Robert Vincent Stansfield OBE FRSA FRGS (born 26 October 1973) is a British political scientist who is Professor of Middle East Politics and Pro-Vice-Chancellor and Executive Dean of the Faculty of Humanities, Arts, and Social Sciences at Exeter University.

== Early life and education ==
Stansfield was educated at Hulme Grammar School, followed by Durham University, where he read Geography and was awarded the W A Moyes Prize. He completed an MA in Middle East Politics and a PhD at the same institution.

== Career ==
Stansfield joined Exeter University as a Research Fellow in 2002.

In 2004, he co-wrote The Future of Iraq: Dictatorship, Democracy or Division? with Liam Anderson.

He has been critical of Turkish policy in Syria.

Stansfield was appointed Officer of the Order of the British Empire (OBE) in the 2024 New Year Honours for services to UK interests in Iraq.

In 2004 he co-wrote The Future of Iraq: Dictatorship, Democracy, or Division? with Liam Anderson, which received mixed reviews. Roger Hardy, writing in International Affairs, praised its historical sections but considered its treatment of Iraq's communities overly compartmentalised, and argued that the authors' sympathy for the Kurds led them to overstate the extent of democracy in Iraqi Kurdistan. Abbas Kadhim, in the International Journal of Middle East Studies, rejected the book's premise that Iraq was an artificial state that could only be held together by force. Michael Rubin, in Middle East Quarterly, described it as an argument for Iraq's dissolution that oversimplified the country's politics.
