= Red Jacket =

Seneca chief (d. 1830)

- Otetiani, later Shagóye:wa:taʼ
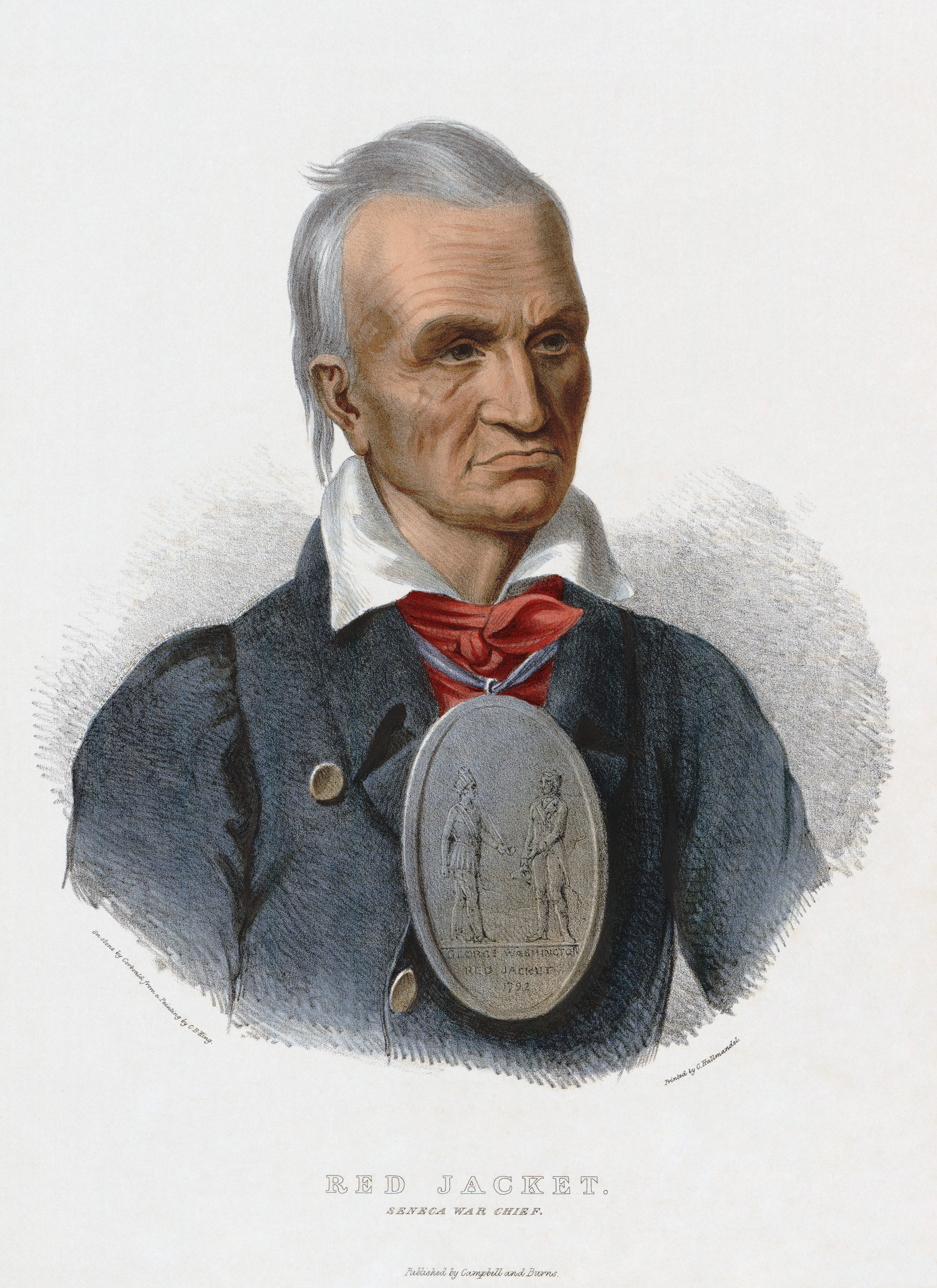
- Red Jacket from an 1835 lithograph by Henry Corbould, after a painting by Charles Bird King, printed by Charles Joseph Hullmandel, and published in History of the Indian Tribes of North America

Tribal chief of the Wolf clan

Personal details
- Born: 1750
- Died: January 20, 1830 (aged 79–80)
- Resting place: Forest Lawn Cemetery, Buffalo, New York, U.S.
- Relatives: Ely S. Parker (great grand-nephew)

Military service
- Allegiance: Seneca nation

Red Jacket (c. 1750 – January 20, 1830), known as Otetiani ("Always Ready") in his youth and later as Shagóye:wa:taʼ ("Keeper Awake", also written as Sagoyewatha) for his oratorical skills, was a Seneca orator and chief. On behalf of his nation, he negotiated with the new United States after the American Revolutionary War, when the Seneca as British allies were forced to cede much land following the defeat of the British; he signed the Treaty of Canandaigua (1794). He helped secure some Seneca territory in New York state, although most of his people had migrated to Canada for resettlement after the Paris Treaty. In his later life, he campaigned against Christianity and in favor of traditional Haudenosaunee religion. Red Jacket's speech on "Religion for the White Man and the Red" (1805) has been preserved as an example of his great oratorical style.

== Life ==
Red Jacket's birthplace has long been a matter of debate. Some historians claim he was born about 1750 at Kanadaseaga, also known as the Old Seneca Castle. Present-day Geneva, New York, developed near here, at the top of Seneca Lake. Others believe he was born near Cayuga Lake and present-day Canoga. Others say he was born south of present-day Branchport, at Keuka Lake near the mouth of Basswood Creek. It is known that he grew up with his family at Basswood Creek, and his mother was buried there after her death. The Haudenosaunee had a matrilineal kinship system, with inheritance and descent figured through the maternal line. Red Jacket was considered to be born into his mother's Wolf Clan, and his social status was based on her family and clan. He was taught by his mother at a young age that truth was a powerful weapon.

Red Jacket lived much of his adult life in Seneca territory in the Genesee River Valley in western New York. In the later years of his life, Red Jacket moved to Canada for a short period of time. He and the Mohawk chief Joseph Brant became bitter enemies and rivals before the American Revolutionary War, although they often met together at the Haudenosaunee Confederacy's Longhouse. During the war, when most of both the Seneca and Mohawk were allies of the British, Brant contemptuously referred to Red Jacket as "cow killer". He alleged that at the Battle of Newtown in 1779, Red Jacket killed a cow and used the blood as evidence to claim he had killed an American rebel.

=== Relationship with Joseph Brant ===
There was a mutual dislike between Red Jacket and Joseph Brant (Thayendanegea). They were rival politicians and each was the leading man among their own people. Since the Senecas and the Mohawks were the principal nations of the Haudenosaunee Confederacy, each sought the first place in the confederacy. Both were artful and eloquent men; while Brant had the advantage of education and travel, Red Jacket was superior in devotion to his people.

Joseph Brant was a bold and sagacious warrior. Red Jacket, on the other hand, disliked war and bloodshed. Red Jacket considered that the Senecas could only be free so long as they remained true to their culture. He believed that every art and custom of 'civilization' which they adopted increased their dependency on the Euro-American society.

While Brant maintained a friendly relationship with the English throughout his life, favoring the introduction of agriculture to the Mohawks and converting to the Christian faith in early life, Red Jacket opposed the missionaries, the Christian religion, and everything that originated from the oppressors of his people. Following some alleged land speculations against Brant in 1803, Red Jacket was successful in removing him from the chieftainship of the Confederacy. However, at a subsequent council, Brant was able to get this decision reversed.

=== Silver medal from George Washington ===
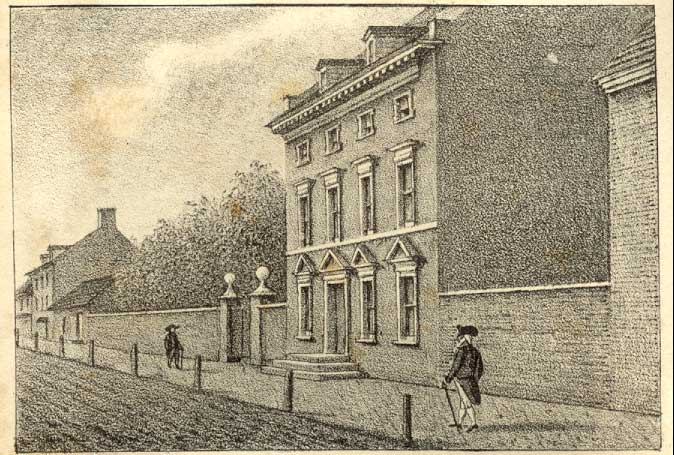
President's House, Philadelphia. Red Jacket met with presidents George Washington, and later John Adams, in the presidential mansion in Philadelphia, when that city was the temporary national capital.

Red Jacket became famous as an orator, speaking for the rights of his people. His language was beautiful and figurative, and delivered with the greatest ease and fluency. After the war, he played a prominent role in negotiations with the new United States federal government. In 1792 he led a delegation of 50 Native American leaders to Philadelphia. The US president George Washington presented him with a special "peace medal", a large oval of silverplate engraved with an image of Washington on the right-hand side shaking Red Jacket's hand; below was inscribed "George Washington", "Red Jacket", and "1792".

Red Jacket wore this medal on his chest in every portrait painted of him. The medal was held from 1895 to 2021 in the collection of the Buffalo History Museum. In May 2021, it was repatriated to the Seneca Nation and is currently held in the collection of the Onöhsagwë:De' Cultural Center, also known as the Seneca-Iroquois National Museum. A formal repatriation ceremony was held on May 17, 2021 at the Seneca Nation's Cultural Centre in Salamanca, since the Native Americans Graves Protection and Repatriation Act recognized Red Jacket's medal as culturally important to the Seneca nation. The Senecas made a formal request for its return in October 2020, almost 125 years after the Buffalo Historical Society came in the possession of the medal in 1898, when the last living relative of the estate of Red Jacket sold it to the museum.

Red Jacket was also presented with a silver inlaid half-stock long rifle, bearing his initials and Wolf clan emblem in the stock and his later name Sagoyewatha inlaid on the barrel. This rifle has been in private hands since his death.

=== Diplomacy ===
In 1794, Red Jacket was a signatory, along with Cornplanter, Handsome Lake, and fifty other Haudenosaunee leaders, of the Treaty of Canandaigua, by which they were forced to cede much of their land to the United States due to the defeat of their British ally during the war. Britain had ceded all its claims to land in the colonies without consulting the Haudenosaunee or other Native American allies. The treaty confirmed peace with the United States, as well as the boundaries of the postwar Phelps and Gorham Purchase (1788) of most of the Seneca land east of the Genesee River in western New York.

In 1790 the Public Universal Friend and the Philadelphia Society of Friends were the first settlers in the formerly Seneca region. Despite the pillaging of the Native River-Settlement in Ah-Wa-Ga Owego, New York, by generals Clinton and Sullivan during the Revolutionary War, the Society made peace with the wary Seneca tribe. The Seneca Tribe made peace with settlers in the Finger Lakes region, but they suffered hardship in the Genesee Region and other parts of Western New York.

In 1797, by the Treaty of Big Tree, Robert Morris paid $100,000 to the Seneca for rights to some of their lands west of the Genesee River. (This area developed as present-day Geneseo in Livingston County). Red Jacket had tried to prevent the sale but, unable to persuade the other chiefs, he gave up his opposition. As often occurred, Morris used gifts of liquor to the Seneca men and trinkets to the women to "grease" the sale. Morris had previously purchased the land from Massachusetts, subject to the Indian title, then sold it to the Holland Land Company for speculative development. He retained only the Morris Reserve, an estate near the present-day city of Rochester. During the negotiations, Brant was reported to have told an insulting story about Red Jacket. Cornplanter intervened and prevented the Seneca leader from attacking and killing Brant.

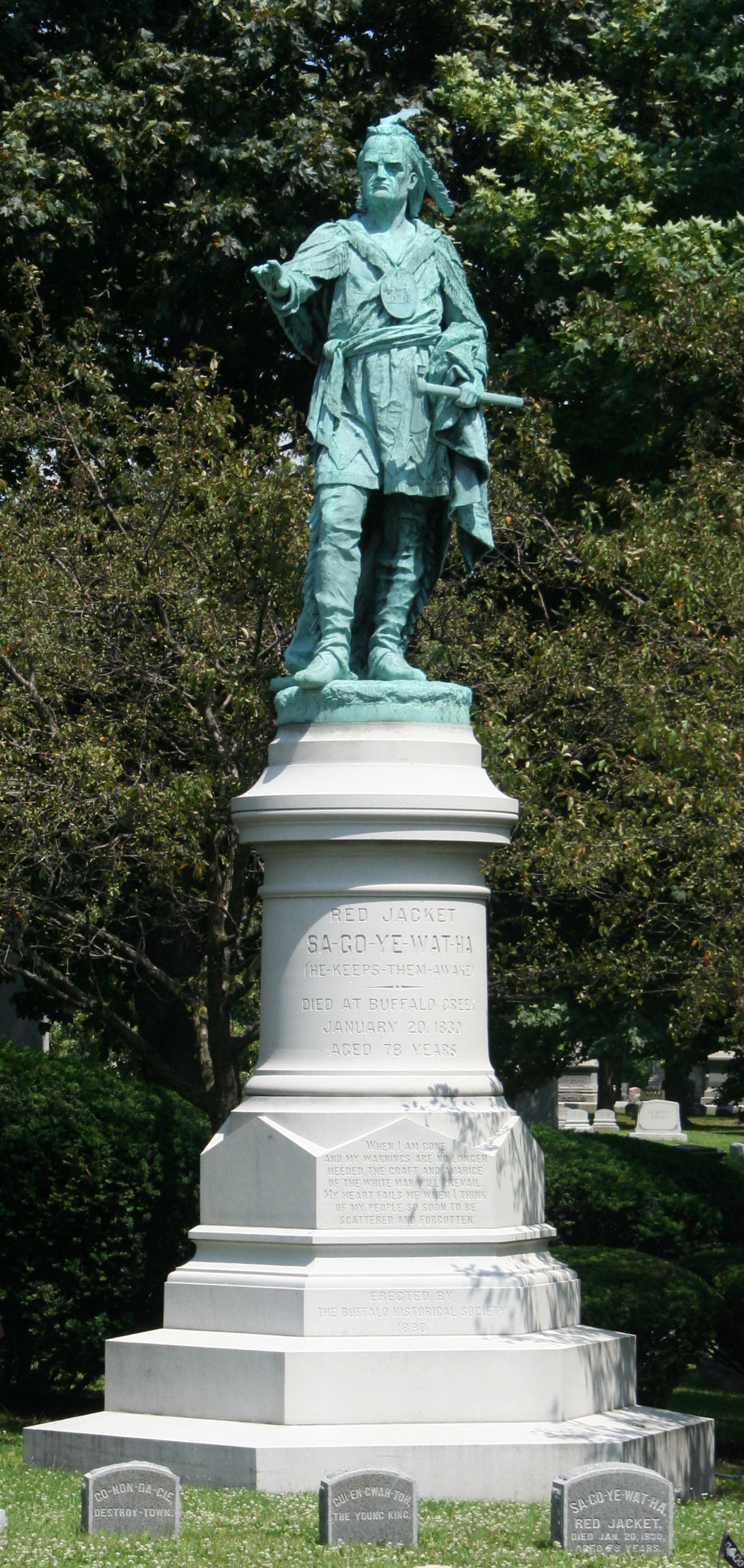
Monument at Forest Lawn Cemetery; sculpted by James G. C. Hamilton.

== War of 1812 ==
Red Jacket took his name, one of several he used as an adult, from a highly favored embroidered coat given to him by the British for his wartime services. The Seneca allied with the British Crown during the American Revolution, both because of their long trading relationships and in the hope that the British could limit American encroachment on their territory. After the British were defeated, the Seneca were forced to cede much of their territory to the United States. Many of their people resettled in Canada at what is now the Six Nations Reserve in Ontario. In the War of 1812, Red Jacket supported the American side. At a council of the New York indigenous nations called on July 6, 1812 by the Indian agent Erastus Granger, Red Jacket acted as a spokesman of the Senecas. When asked by Granger if the Senecas were to join the war on the British side, Red Jacket replied that his people cared more for peace than for war, and that he did not wish their Canadian brothers’ blood be spilled when there was so little occasion for it.

== Later life ==
His later adult name, Sagoyewatha (Seneca: Shagóye:wa:taʼ) , which roughly translates as "he keeps them awake", was given by the Seneca about 1780 in recognition of his oratory skill. When in 1805 Jacob Cram, a New England missionary, asked to do mission work among the Seneca, Red Jacket responded by saying that the Seneca had suffered much at the hands of Europeans. His speech, "Religion for the White Man and the Red", expressed his profound belief that Native American religion was fitting and sufficient for Seneca and Native American culture. It has been documented and preserved as one of the best examples of North American oratory.

Red Jacket developed a problem with alcohol and deeply regretted having taken his first drink (see following quote). When asked if he had children, the chief, who had lost most of his offspring to illness, said:

Red Jacket was once a great man, and in favor with the Great Spirit. He was a lofty pine among the smaller trees of the forest. But, after years of glory, he degraded himself by drinking the firewater of the white man. The Great Spirit has looked upon him in anger, and his lightning has stripped the pine of its branches.

In his later years, Sagoyewatha lived in Buffalo, New York. In his last public speech titled ‘I am an aged tree and can stand no longer’ from 1829, Red Jacket foresaw his death. He stated that he was like an old tree whose leaves had fallen, branches withered, and that he had been shaken by every breeze. Although he was about to be joined with the spirits of his ancestors, it made him uneasy to think about the Senecas, who, as he rightfully predicted, were soon to be scattered and forgotten. On his death, his remains were buried in an Indian cemetery (now within Seneca Indian Park in South Buffalo, New York). In 1876, the politician William C. Bryant presented a plan to the Council of the Seneca Nation to reinter Red Jacket's remains in Forest Lawn Cemetery in Buffalo. This was carried out on October 9, 1884. The proceedings, with papers documenting speeches given by Horatio Hale, General Ely S. Parker (Red Jacket's nephew's grandson, known as a "clan grandson," who inherited the famous medal), and others, were published (Buffalo, 1884). A memorial to Red Jacket, sculpted by James G. C. Hamilton, still stands within Seneca Indian Park.

According to Appletons' Cyclopædia of American Biography, "Several portraits were made of him. George Catlin painted him twice, Henry Inman once, and Robert W. Weir did his portrait in 1828, when Red Jacket was on a visit to New York City. Fitz-Greene Halleck has celebrated him in song."

== Speech to Rev. Cram ==
This famous speech, also known as his talk on "Religion for the White Man and the Red", is an example of his great skill as an orator. He spoke in 1805 as a response to a request by Jacob Cram, a New England missionary, to evangelize among the Seneca. On this day, the two men met in Buffalo Creek, New York, to discuss their religious beliefs. After meeting with the leaders of the Seneca delegation, Red Jacket provided a thought-out response representing his people as a whole. After expressing his gratitude to the Great Spirit for the opportunity to meet, Red Jacket stated that the Senecas listened with excitement to Cram’s proposal. He responded to Cram's words: "There is but one religion, and but one way to serve God, and if you do not embrace the right way, you cannot be happy hereafter". Red Jacket argued peacefully that the European Americans and Native American peoples should each have the right to worship the religion that suits them best.

At the time, the Haudenosaunee of present-day New York State were having difficulty dealing with the constant increase of European immigrants and encroachment on their remaining lands. As the numbers of European Americans grew in the Haudenosaunee territories, the two peoples' opposing cultures became more and more apparent.

Red Jacket made it clear that he and his people would not change their religious beliefs based on the white man's word. He began, "It was the will of the Great Spirit that we should meet together this day. He orders all things, and has given us a fine day for our Council." He proceeded to count all the blessings on the day, attributing them to the Great Spirit. "For all these favors we thank the Great Spirit, and Him only."

Red Jacket said that his peoples' beliefs were very like those of the missionary, differing only in the names of their omnipresent and almighty creator. Their creation stories were the same. "There was a time when our forefathers owned this great island. Their seats extended from the rising to the setting sun. The Great Spirit had made it for the use of Indians. He had created the buffalo, the deer, and other animals for food . ... He had caused the earth to produce corn for bread. All this He had done for his red children, because He loved them." But that changed when Cram’s forefathers crossed the ocean and landed in the Americas to freely enjoy their religion. Red Jacket pointed out that they were greeted by the indigenous peoples who gave them corn and meat. But what they got in return was poison and liquor. The difference between the faiths involved not whether an almighty creator existed, but which faith was the truth and deserved to be followed.

Red Jacket questioned the legitimacy of the white man's beliefs. "You say that you are sent to instruct us how to worship the Great Spirit agreeably to his mind, and, if we do not take hold of the religion which you white people teach, we shall be unhappy hereafter. You say that you are right and we are lost." Haudenosaunee "separatist" belief held that there is not necessarily one true religion for all people. Red Jacket acknowledged that the European Americans' religious beliefs were based on a sacred text, but said, "If it was intended for us as well as you, why has not the Great Spirit given to us, and not only to us, but why did he not give to our forefathers, the knowledge of that book, with the means of understanding it rightly?"

In conclusion he urged his audience to accept different forms of belief. "The Great Spirit has made us all, but He has made a great difference between his white and red children ... to you He has given the arts. To these He has not opened our eyes. We know these things to be true. Since He has made so great a difference between us in other things, why may we not conclude that he has given us a different religion according to our understanding? The Great Spirit does right. He knows what is best for his children; we are satisfied." "We do not wish to destroy your religion, or take it from you. We only want to enjoy our own."

On another occasion, Red Jacket delivered a speech known as ‘We like our religion and do not want another’ to Reverend Alexander from New York City during a Seneca council at Buffalo Creek in May 1811. Noticing that ‘the black coats’ come with sweet voices and smiling faces, offering to teach the religion of the white people, Red Jacket proposed that, if they wished well to the Senecas, to keep away and not disturb them. The reason being that the Senecas loved their own religion and did not want another.

=== Civility ===
In his "Speech to the U.S. Senate", Red Jacket was respectful and open-minded regarding his visitors' beliefs, hoping that his audience would respond similarly. "We have listened with attention to what you have said. You requested us to speak our minds freely. This gives us great joy; for we now consider that we stand upright before you, and can speak what we think." He reassured his audience that he understood they were far from home, and would waste no time in giving them his answer.

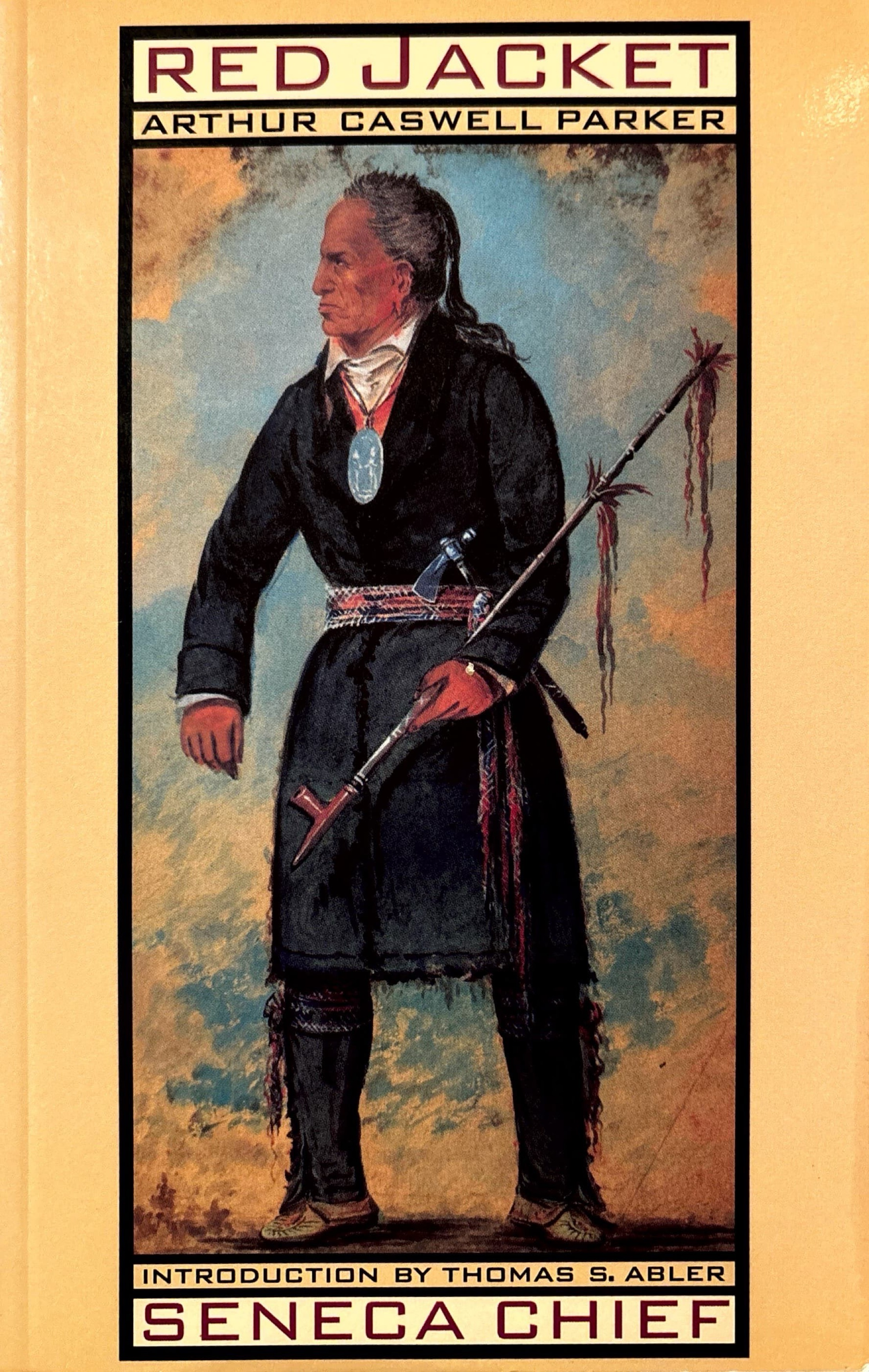
Red Jacket by George Catlin. 1827. Watercolour on paper.

On the relations between his people and the first white settlers to come to their land, he said, "They found friends and not enemies ... they asked for a small seat. We took pity on them, granted their request; and they sat amongst us. We gave them corn and meat; they gave us poison." He argued that it was wrong to portray his people as savages, when they had shown kindness but received in return only "poison" (hard liquor). Further,

Yet we did not fear them. We took them to be friends. They called us brothers. We believed them and gave them a larger seat ... they wanted more land; they wanted our country. Our eyes were opened, and our minds became uneasy. You have got our country, but are not satisfied; you want to force your religion upon us.

The white settlers' actions did not encourage belief in their religion. "How shall we know when to believe, being so often deceived by the white people?"

Red Jacket also acknowledged that the white settlers' religion was beset with divisive controversies, unlike his peoples' own faith.

We also have a religion, which was given to our forefathers, and has been handed down to us their children. We worship in that way. It teaches us to be thankful for all the favors we receive; to love each other, and to be united. We never quarrel about religion.

He wished his visitors well. "You have now heard our answer to your talk, and this is all we have to say at present. As we are going to part, we will come and take you by the hand, and hope the Great Spirit will protect you on your journey, and return you safe to your friends."

=== Rhetoric ===
Red Jacket's "Speech to the U.S. Senate" expresses his ability to use a distinct form of rhetoric that distinguishes the difference in religious tolerance between the Indians and United States citizens. His emotional appeal to members of the US Senate, whom he feels are neglecting the Indians' right of religious freedom, is an example of his attempt to persuade his audience to recognize their fallacies. He repeatedly refers to the Great Spirit, who he believes oversees both the red and white man.

At the beginning, he says,

But we will first look back a little, and tell you what our fathers have told us, and what we have heard from the white people". Red Jacket is referring to the history of how the white man has treated the red man on the latter's native soil. The white man commonly tried to persuade the Indians, whom he considered less fortunate, to adopt the ways of Western society. Red Jacket noted the European Americans had tried to force their religion on the Indian peoples. Red Jacket recognized religion as a cultural right, but he explained that the Indians had inherited their belief system within their culture just as the European Americans had been given the Bible and Christianity. He said that both people came from a similar Great Spirit, yet it is up to the beholder as to how he accepts religion. The attempts of European Americans to force Christianity on the Indians violated the liberties of both people. Red Jacket said, "You have now become a great people, and we have scarcely a place left to spread our blankets. You have got our country, but are not satisfied; you want to force your religion upon us.

Red Jacket continues to identify the religious continuities that exist between both people with his elaboration on the Great Spirit. He states, "You say there is but one way to worship and serve the Great Spirit. If there is but one religion, why do you white people differ so much about it? Why not all agreed, as you can all read the book?". Red Jacket distinguishes the fallacies that exist between the Americans' speech and their actions. If the Indians are being secularized for their religious beliefs, yet they believe in one ultimate Creator, just like the European Americans, how can they be viewed as a lesser body? Red Jacket says they do not understand the European Americans' mission to eradicate the Indians based on religion, but Red Jacket sees the European Americans as divided in their beliefs. However, he goes on to say that the Great Spirit is not one that can tear the two people apart but ultimately unite them in their ability to peacefully coexist.

Red Jacket's ability to distinguish this form of religious discussion was very favorable to his legacy in history. He argues the injustices of the cultural system in the time period but does not back away from recognizing their common cultural and religious beliefs.

== Honors and legacy ==
A variety of structures, ships and places were named in his honor, especially in the Finger Lakes region and Buffalo:

- A complex of dormitory buildings at the University at Buffalo
- Red Jacket Dining Hall at SUNY Geneseo.
- The Red Jacket Building, an apartment and commercial building in Buffalo.
- A memorial statue and Red Jacket Park are in Penn Yan, New York, near Keuka Lake. The statue was sculpted by Michael Soles.
- Red Jacket Yacht Club, which lies on the western shores of Cayuga Lake.
- The Red Jacket clipper ship, which set the unbroken speed record from New York to Liverpool.
- A public school system, Red Jacket Central, which serves the communities of Manchester and Shortsville in Ontario County, New York.
- The Red Jacket Volunteer Fire Department, which served the Town of Seneca Falls.
- A section of land on the Buffalo River is named "Red Jacket Peninsula". On the eastern bank of the river is the plaque containing a brief bio of Red Jacket and river history.
- Red Jacket Parkway in South Buffalo
- The community of Red Jacket in southern West Virginia, although the leader was not known to have had any connection to that region.
- There is a hand-carved portrait of Red Jacket alongside a brief quotation from his Senate speech on the Empire State Carousel at the Fenimore Farm and Country Village in Cooperstown, New York.
- A Red Jacket mural painted by Caine Mahoney (aka Kean Mahaney, Kean Mahony) in the late 1800s. It was above the fireplace in the former Hulett residence in Niagara Falls NY.
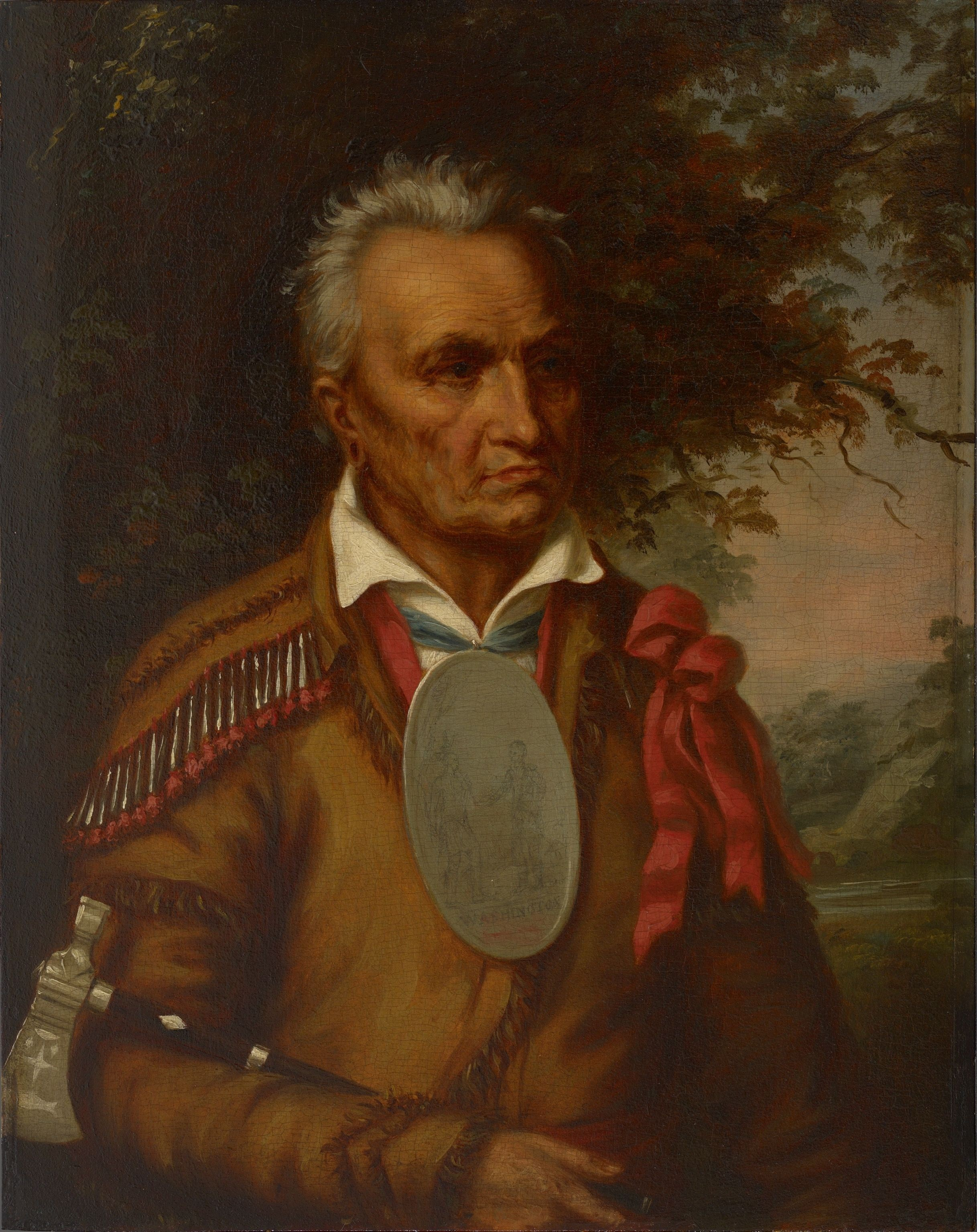
Red Jacket wearing the "Peace Medal" given to him by George Washington. Portrait by Charles Bird King, ca. 1828, Colby College Museum of Art.

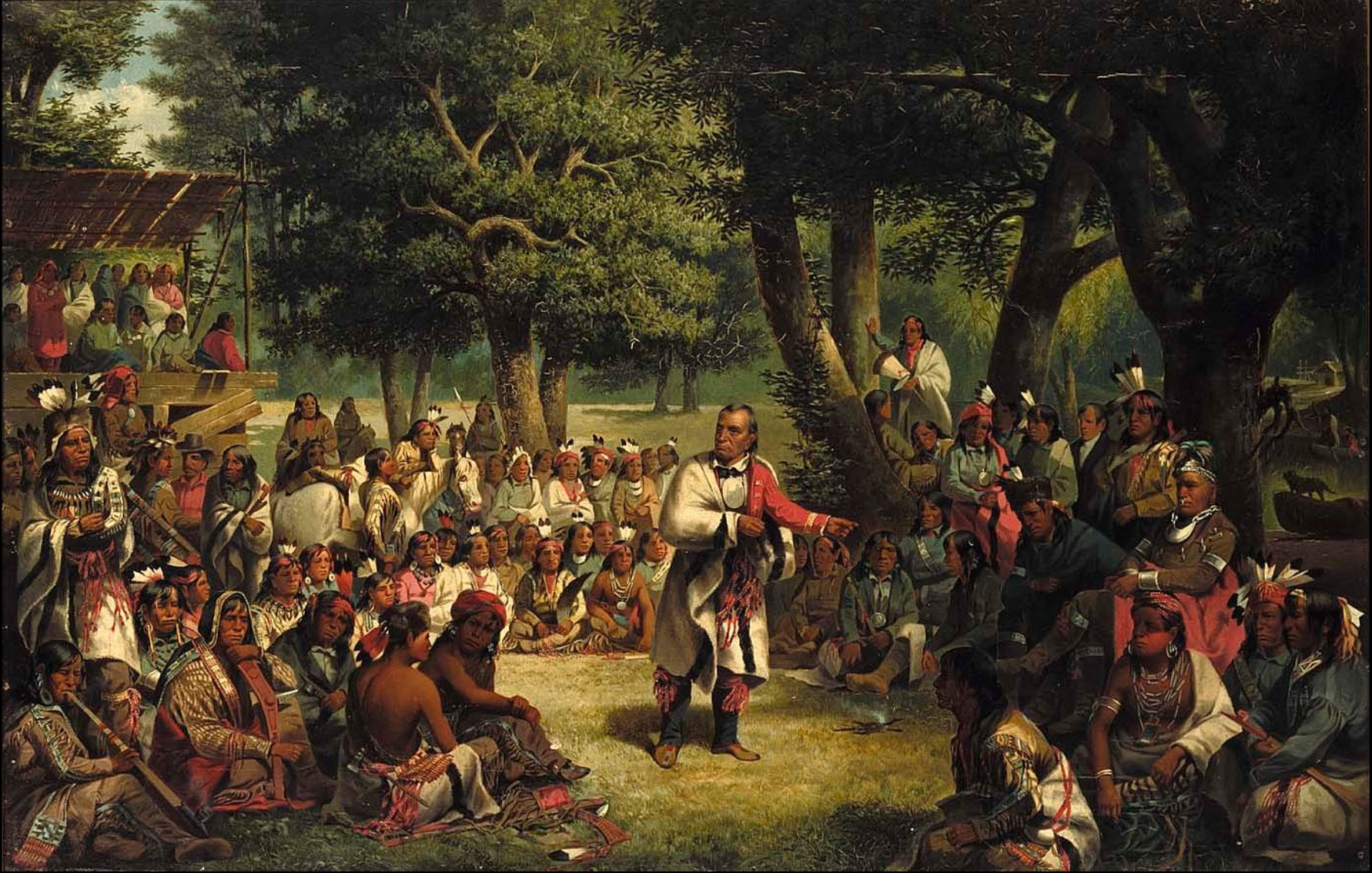
The Trial of Red Jacket, by John Mix Stanley, 1869.

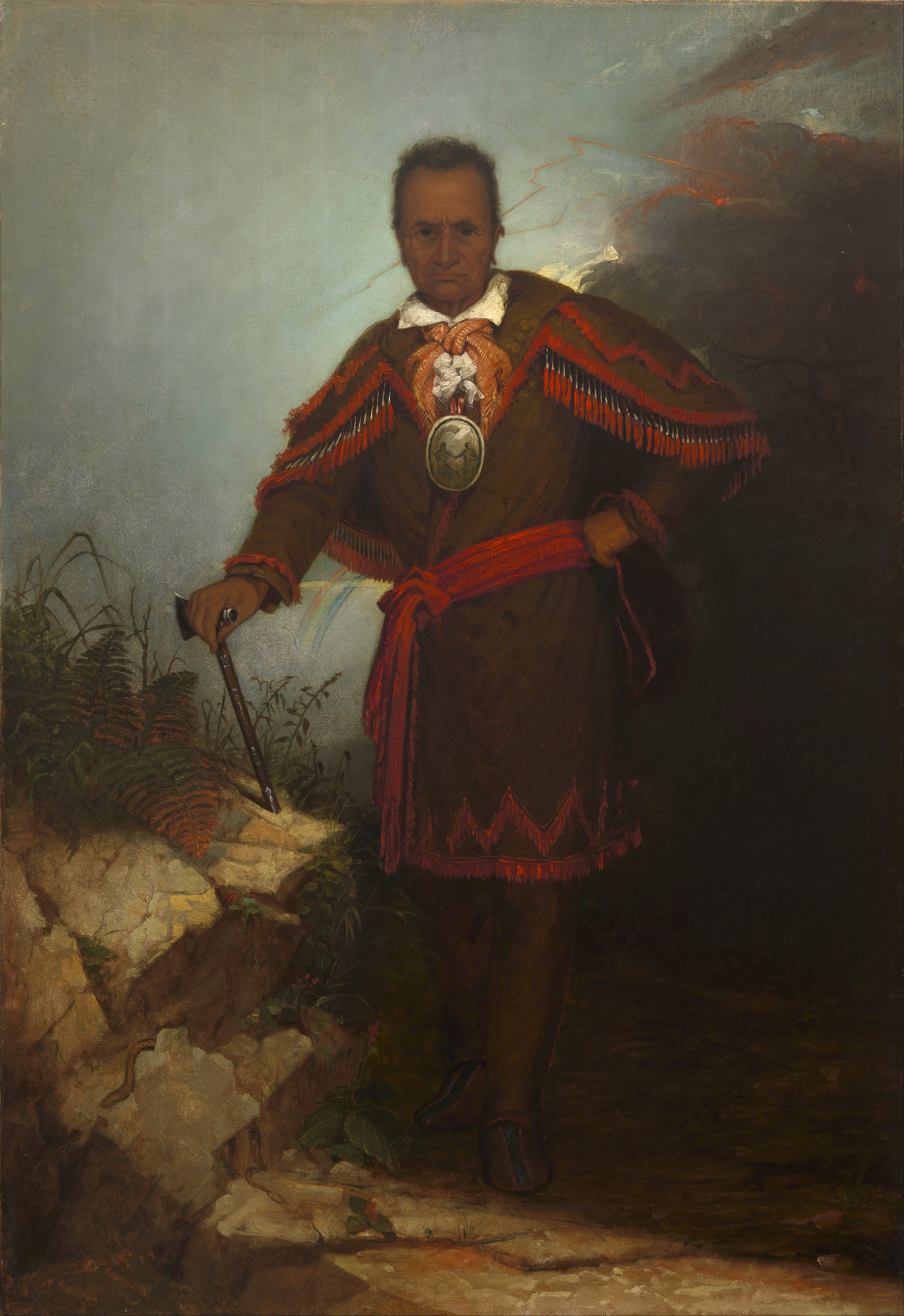
Portrait by Thomas Hicks (1868), National Portrait Gallery

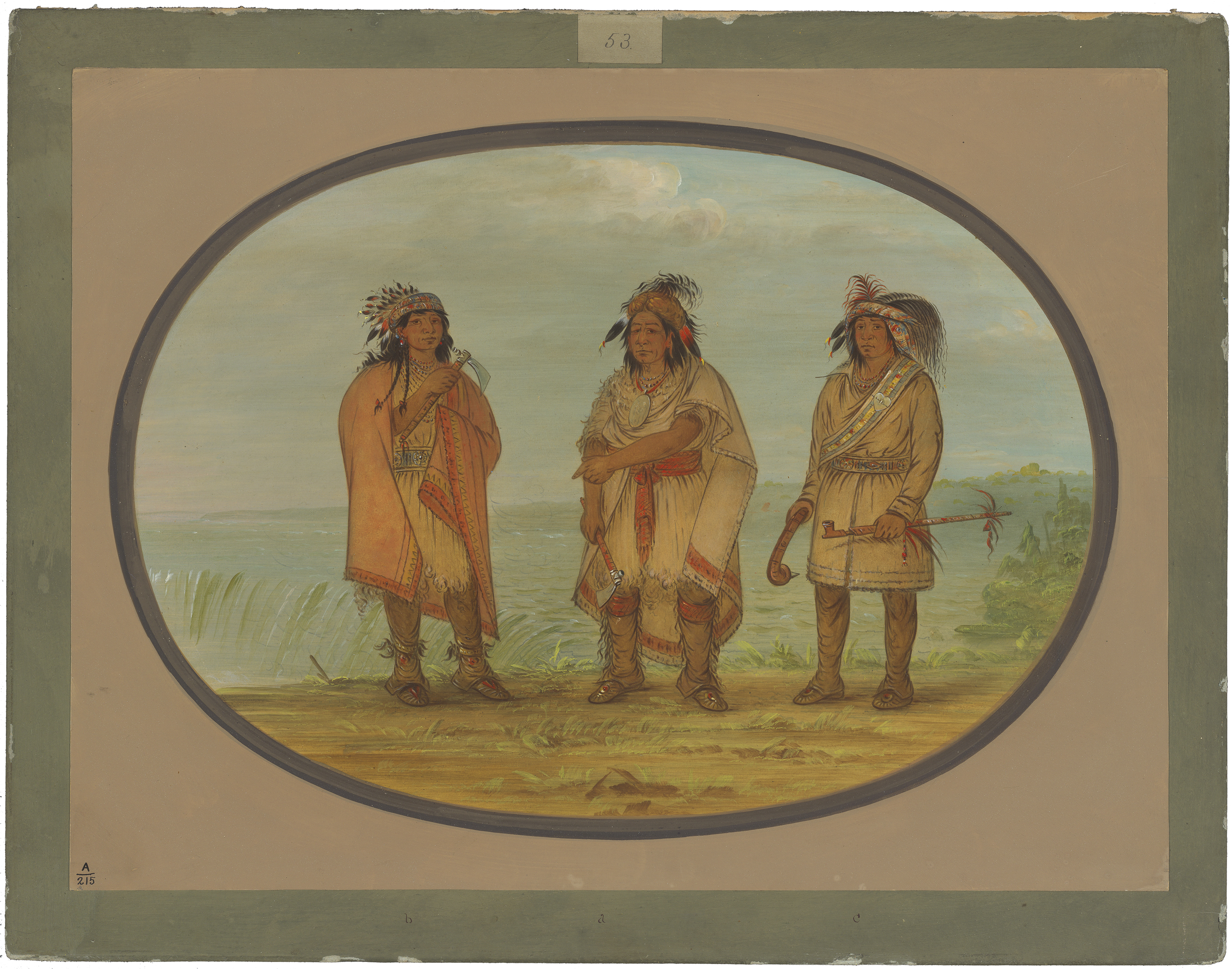
Chief Red Jacket, with Two Warriors, by George Catlin

== See also ==
- U.S. Constitution, Native American influence
