= Eleanor D. Acheson =

American lawyer

United States Assistant Attorney General for the Office of Policy Development
- In office 1993-2001
- President: Bill Clinton
- Preceded by: Stephen Markman
- Succeeded by: Viet D. Dinh

Personal details
- Born: Eleanor Dean Acheson; 1947 (age 78–79)
- Party: Democratic
- Spouse: Emily C. Hewitt
- Parent(s): David Acheson; Patricia James Castles
- Relatives: Dean Acheson (grandfather); Ed Acheson (great-grandfather); Will Gooderham (3x great grandfather)
- Education: Wellesley College (BA); George Washington University (JD)

Eleanor Dean Acheson (born 1947) is an American lawyer who served as Assistant Attorney General of the United States for the Office of Policy Development as part of the Clinton administration.

== Early life ==
Acheson is the daughter of David Campion Acheson (1921–2018) and Patricia James Castles (1925–2000) who married in 1943. Her mother was from New York and was a graduate of Bryn Mawr College. She taught at the Cathedral School from 1959 until the mid-1960s and had earlier taught at the Potomac and Madeira Schools. She wrote books for students of American history including America's Colonial Heritage, Our Federal Government, and The Supreme Court.

Her father, David Campion Acheson, was an American attorney who worked for the United States Atomic Energy Commission and served as an assistant to former Treasury secretary Henry H. Fowler. Her grandfather was the former United States Secretary of State Dean Acheson. Acheson's great-grandfather was Edward Campion Acheson (1858–1934), an English-born Church of England priest who moved to the U.S. to become Episcopal Bishop of Connecticut. Acheson's great-grandmother was Eleanor Gertrude Gooderham, the Canadian-born granddaughter of prominent Canadian distiller William Gooderham (1790–1881), who was a founder of the Gooderham and Worts Distillery. Her grandmother, Alice Acheson, a painter and graduate of Wellesley College, was the daughter of Louis Stanley, a railroad lawyer and Jane C. Stanley, a watercolorist. Alice's grandfather was John Mix Stanley, a renowned painter of American Indian life in the Wild West.

She had two siblings:

- David Campion Acheson Jr., an architect and principal of Acheson Doyle Partners Architects, who married Susan D. Sturges in 1986
- Peter W. Acheson, an independent film maker who married Mary Vaux, a freelance writer

Acheson attended the Westover School graduating in 1965, followed by Wellesley College, graduating in 1969. She then attended the George Washington University Law School, graduating in 1973.

== Career ==
As Assistant Attorney General, Acheson worked on the Year 2000 readiness and responsibility act (H.R. 775) also known as the "Y2K Act".

She was public policy and government affairs director at the National Gay and Lesbian Task Force until January 2007, in which capacity she led efforts on Capitol Hill to secure funds for the LGBT community. Although she left that job after her appointment in 2007 as vice president and general counsel of Amtrak, she continues to be a strategy advisor to the National Gay and Lesbian Task Force, representing the group in key meetings on Capitol Hill.

Acheson attended Wellesley College with Hillary Clinton who, in her 1969 student commencement speech, acknowledges the influence of Acheson in helping Clinton become the first student in Wellesley College history to deliver its commencement address. Acheson received her JD from George Washington University Law School and went on to serve as a law clerk to U.S. District Court Judge Edward T. Gignoux in Maine from 1973 to 1974. She then practiced for 19 years with the Boston-based firm Ropes & Gray, becoming a litigation partner in 1983.

During her confirmation process she came under criticism because of her longtime membership in an exclusive club that had no black members. Senator Kennedy (D-MA), a member of the Senate Judiciary Committee, said that Ms. Acheson "clearly meets the Senate Judiciary Committee standard on the club issue".

== Personal life ==
Acheson is married to Emily C. Hewitt, the former chief judge of the United States Court of Federal Claims.

== See also ==
- David Campion Acheson
- Dean Acheson
- Emily C. Hewitt
