= Alice Stanley =

Alice Spencer may refer to:

- Alice Acheson (1895–1996), born Alice Stanley, painter
- Alice Spencer (1559–1637), married name Alice Stanley, Countess of Derby
- Alice Stanley, Countess of Derby (1862–1957)
