= David Campion Acheson =

American attorney

- Born: November 4, 1921; Washington, D.C., U.S.
- Died: August 16, 2018 (aged 96); Washington, D.C., U.S.
- Education: Yale University (BA); Harvard University (LLB)
- Spouse: Patricia Castles (m. 1943; died 2000)
- Children: Eleanor D. Acheson; David C. Acheson Jr.; Peter W. Acheson
- Parents: Dean Gooderham Acheson; Alice Stanley
- Relatives: Edward Campion Acheson (grandfather); William Gooderham (2x great grandfather); William Bundy (brother-in-law); Emily C. Hewitt (daughter-in-law)

David Campion Acheson (November 4, 1921 – August 16, 2018) was an American attorney. Son of United States Secretary of State Dean Acheson, he worked for the United States Atomic Energy Commission and served as an assistant to Treasury Secretary Henry H. Fowler.

== Early life and education ==
David Campion Acheson was born in Washington, D.C., on November 4, 1921, to Dean Acheson (1893–1971) and Alice Caroline Stanley (1895–1996). At the time of his birth, Acheson's father was a clerk for Supreme Court Justice Louis Brandeis. His parents had three children: (1) Jane Acheson (1919–2003), who married Dudley Brown (?-1975), (2) David Campion Acheson, and (3) Mary Eleanor Acheson (born 1924), who married William Bundy (1917–2000), an attorney, analyst with the CIA, and foreign affairs adviser to presidents John F. Kennedy and Lyndon B. Johnson

Acheson attended the Groton School, graduating in 1939. That fall, Acheson entered Yale University and joined the Naval ROTC. While he was at Yale, he was inducted in the honor society of Skull and Bones, ultimately graduating in 1942. In 1948, Acheson received a LL.B. from Harvard Law School.

=== Family ===
Acheson's paternal grandfather was Edward Campion Acheson (1858–1934), an English-born Church of England priest who, after several years in Canada, moved to the U.S. to become Episcopal Bishop of Connecticut. Acheson's paternal grandmother was Eleanor Gertrude Gooderham, the Canadian-born granddaughter of prominent Canadian distiller William Gooderham (1790–1881), who was a founder of the Gooderham and Worts Distillery.

Acheson's mother, Alice, was a painter, and his maternal grandparents were Louis Stanley, a railroad lawyer, and Jane C. Stanley, a watercolorist. His great-grandfather was John Mix Stanley (1814–1872), a renowned painter of American Indian life in the Wild West. Alice graduated from Wellesley College and over the years exhibited her oil paintings and watercolors at New York's Wildenstein and Washington's Franz Bader Gallery, and in such museums as the Corcoran and the Phillips Collection. Her subjects included scenes of Washington, portraits and landscapes of exotic lands she visited over the years.

== Career ==
=== Military service ===
In 1942, Acheson was commissioned in the United States Naval Reserve and served until 1946 in the Pacific theater, seeing action in the Solomon Islands, New Guinea and the Philippines. He served on destroyer escorts from 1943 through 1945 and rose from ensign to lieutenant. For his service, he was awarded four battle stars.

=== Government service ===
From 1948 until 1950, worked as an attorney for the United States Atomic Energy Commission. From 1961 until 1965, he was the United States Attorney for the District of Columbia. In 1965, President Lyndon B. Johnson announced that Acheson was resigning from the U.S. Attorney's office to become a special assistant in the United States Secretary of the Treasury, under Henry H. Fowler. From 1965 until he left the Treasury in 1967, Acheson was responsible for coordinating the Treasury's law enforcement activity. The job included overseeing the Secret Service and the Bureau of Narcotics as well as providing technical guidance for enforcement activities of the Bureau of Customs, Coast Guard and Internal Revenue Service.

=== Post-government service ===
After he left the Treasury Department, he served as senior vice president of Communications Satellite Corporation, until he left for the law firm of Jones, Day, Reavis & Pogue in 1974. From 1989 until 1991, he was a director of the Institute for Technology and Strategic Research with George Washington University. From 1991 until 1992, Acheson was a consultant to the Atlantic Council and in 1993, through 1999, he served as its president and chief executive officer, as well as serving its board of directors.

Acheson practiced law for many years at various firms in Washington, DC.

- 1950–1958 - Covington & Burling (Associate)
- 1958–1961 - Covington & Burling (Partner)
- 1974–1978 - Jones, Day, Reavis & Pogue (Partner)
- 1978–1988 - Drinker Biddle & Reath (Partner)

Acheson was also selected to serve on the Rogers Commission that investigated the cause of the Space Shuttle Challenger disaster.

== Personal life ==
In 1943, Acheson married Patricia James Castles who was from New York and a graduate of Bryn Mawr College. Together they had 3 children:

- Eleanor Dean Acheson (born 1947), an American lawyer who served as Assistant Attorney General of the United States in the Clinton Administration, who married Emily C. Hewitt (born 1944), former Judge and Chief Judge of the United States Court of Federal Claims
- David Campion Acheson Jr., an architect and principal of Acheson Doyle Partners Architects, who married Susan D. Sturges in 1986
- Peter W. Acheson, an independent film maker who married Mary Vaux, a freelance writer

Patricia taught at the Cathedral School from 1959 until the mid-1960s and had earlier taught at the Potomac and Madeira Schools. She wrote books for students of American history including America's Colonial Heritage, Our Federal Government, and The Supreme Court. She died of emphysema on March 7, 2000.

Acheson resided in the Foggy Bottom section of Washington, D.C., and served on many government committees including the Presidential Commission on the space shuttle Challenger accident.

Acheson died at home in Washington, D.C., on August 16, 2018, at the age of 96.

== Published works ==
- This Vast External Realm (1973, W. W. Norton)
- Among Friends (1980, Dodd, Mead and Company)
- Effective Washington Representation (1983, Harcourt Brace Jovanovich)
- Acheson Country: A Memoir (1993, W. W. Norton)
- Affection and Trust: The Personal Correspondence of Harry S. Truman and Dean Acheson, 1953-1971 (2010, Alfred A. Knopf)
