= James G. C. Hamilton =

American sculptor

James Gilbert Claude Hamilton (18 May 1851 – 26 March 1926) was a Scottish-American sculptor active in Cleveland, Ohio from about 1887-1898. According to Artists in Ohio, he was said to be a graduate of the Pennsylvania Academy of the Fine Arts, and according to the Building News and Engineering Journal, he served as an assistant to Alexander Milne Calder for sculptures in the Philadelphia City Hall. Hamilton was a Freemason as a member of Franklin Ledge #20.

Hamilton was born in Scotland to James Hamilton and Margaret Hood and immigrated to the United States in 1862. In 1851, he married Elizabeth Dalzell in Philadelphia. They resided in New York City. He died in 1926 in Detroit.

His other notable works include:

- Monument to 1st New York Independent Battery Light Artillery, "Cowan's Battery," 1887, Gettysburg, Pennsylvania
- Gen. Moses Cleaveland, 1888, Public Square, Cleveland, Ohio
- Major John Mason, 1889, Mystic, Connecticut (Statue of John Mason)
- Red Jacket Monument, 1890, Forest Lawn Cemetery, Buffalo, New York
- Harvey Rice Monument, 1900, Wade Park, Cleveland, Ohio

Hamilton sculpted these works while under contract to the Smith Granite Company of Westerly, Rhode Island.

== Works ==
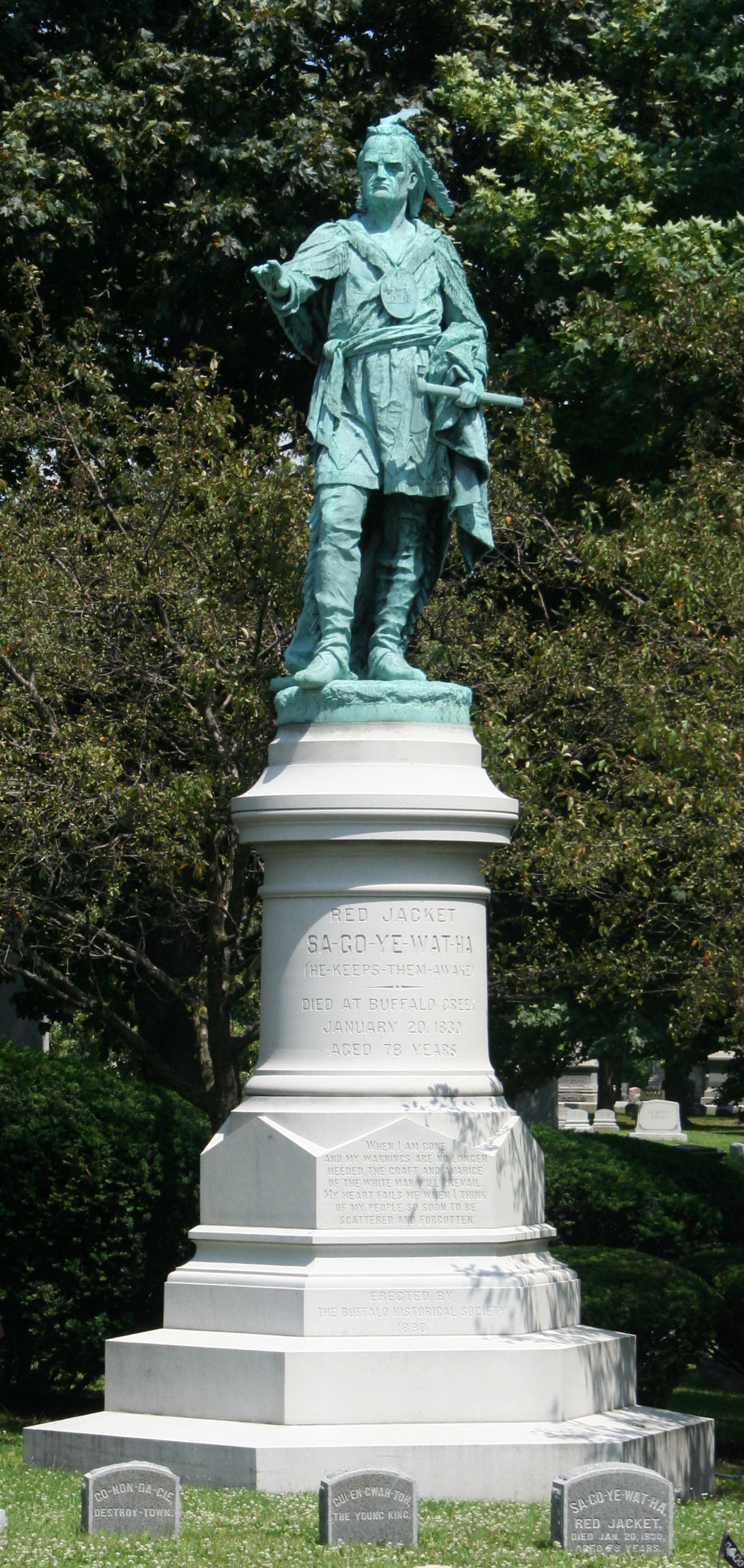
Red Jacket Monument, 1890, Forest Lawn Cemetery in Buffalo, New York.

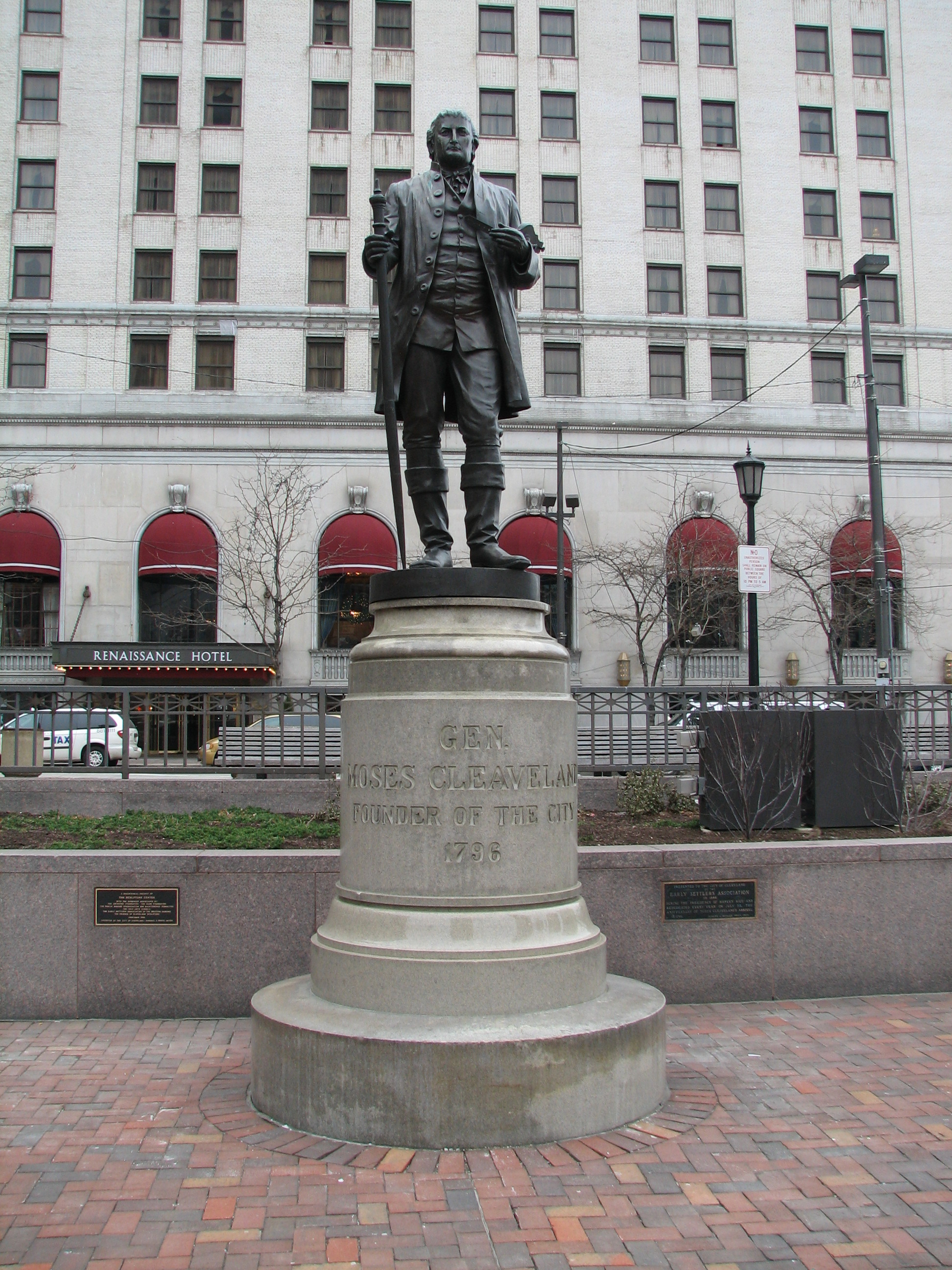
Moses Cleaveland statue, 1888, Public Square in Cleveland, Ohio.

== Sources ==
- Artists in Ohio, 1787-1900: A Biographical Dictionary, by Jeffrey Weidman, Oberlin College. Library, Kent State University Press, 2000, page 369.
- The Monumental News, Volume 12, 1900, page 275.
- The Building News and Engineering Journal, Volume 46, Office for Publication and advertisements, 1884, page 972.
