= Moses Cleaveland =

Founder of Cleveland, Ohio (1754–1806)

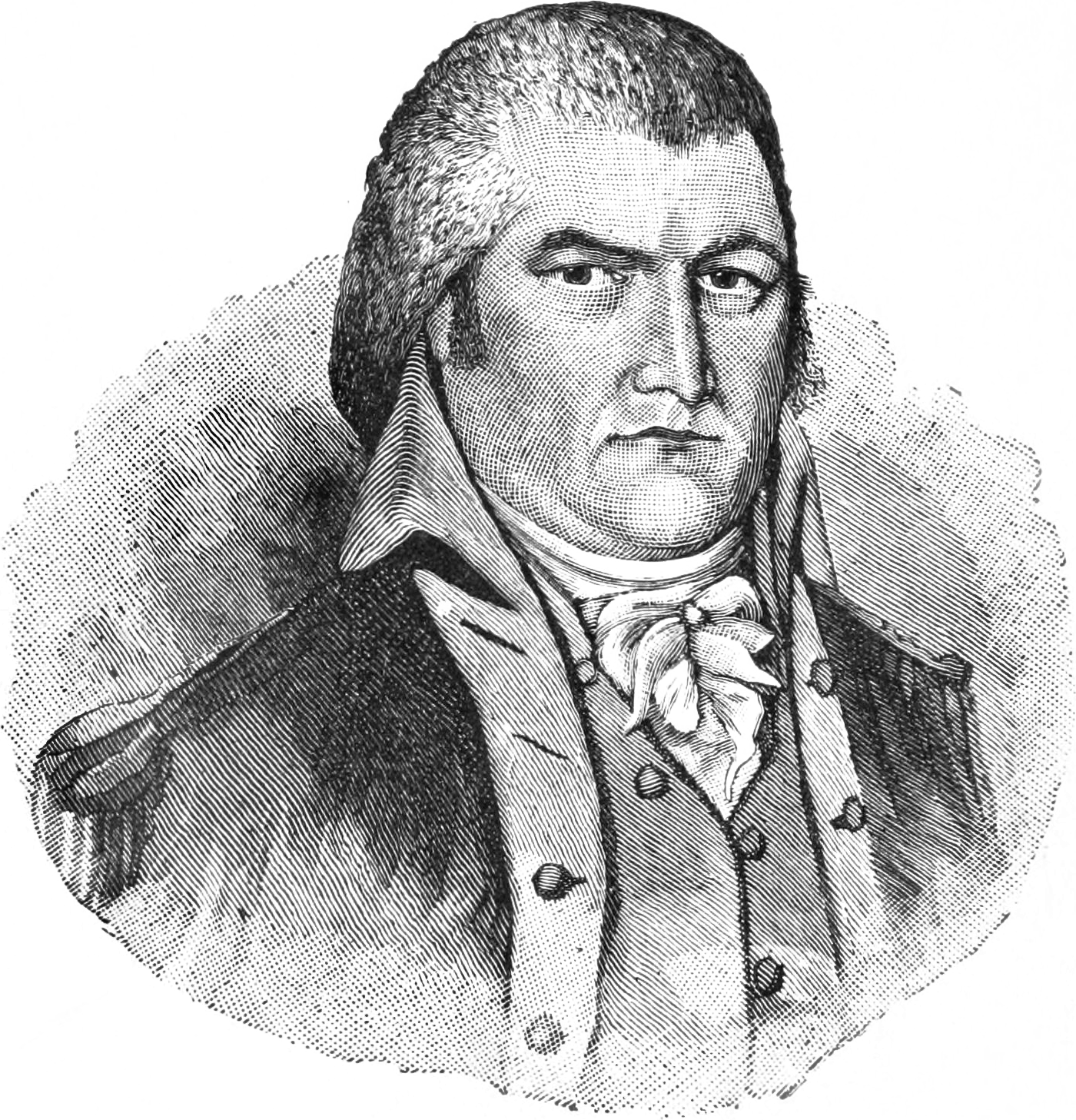
- General Moses Cleaveland
- Born: January 29, 1754; Canterbury, Connecticut Colony, British America
- Died: November 16, 1806 (aged 52); Canterbury, Connecticut, U.S.
- Known for: Founder of Cleveland, Ohio

Moses Cleaveland (January 29, 1754 – November 16, 1806) was an American lawyer, politician, soldier, and surveyor from Connecticut who founded the city of Cleveland, Ohio, while surveying the Connecticut Western Reserve in 1796. During the American Revolution, Cleaveland was the brigadier general of the Connecticut militia.

== Early life ==
Cleaveland was born in Canterbury, Connecticut Colony, to Colonel Aaron Cleaveland (1725–1785) and Thankful Cleaveland (1733–1822). He studied law at Yale College, where he was a member of Brothers in Unity, graduating in 1777. He was commissioned as an ensign in the 2nd Connecticut Regiment of the Continental Army in 1777 during the American Revolution. In 1779, he was promoted to captain of a company of "sappers and miners" (combat engineers) in the newly formed Corps of Engineers. He resigned from the army on June 7, 1781, and started a legal practice in Canterbury.

== Militia career ==
Cleaveland was a member of the Connecticut convention that ratified the United States Constitution. He was elected to the Connecticut General Assembly several times and was commissioned brigadier general of militia in 1796. He was a shareholder in the Connecticut Land Company which had purchased land from Connecticut located in northeastern Ohio for $1,200,000. The land was reserved to Connecticut by Congress and was initially known as New Connecticut, but it came to be known as the Western Reserve.

Cleaveland was approached by the directors of the company in May 1796 and asked to lead the survey of the tract and the location of purchases. He was also responsible for the negotiations with the Native Americans living on the land. In June 1796, he set out from Schenectady, New York. His party was composed of 50 people, including six surveyors, a physician, a chaplain, a boatman, 37 employees, a few emigrants, and two women who accompanied their husbands. Some journeyed by land with the horses and cattle, while the main body went in boats up the Mohawk River, down the Oswego River, along the shore of Lake Ontario, and up the Niagara River, carrying their boats over the seven-mile (11 km) portage at Niagara Falls.

== Personal life ==
Cleaveland married Esther Champion on March 2, 1797, with whom he had four children.

== Founding of Cleveland ==
At Buffalo, a delegation from the nearby Mohawk and Seneca tribes opposed the party's entrance into the Western Reserve, claiming it as their territory, but they waived their rights on the receipt of goods valued at $1,200. The expedition then coasted along the shore of Lake Erie and landed at the mouth of Conneaut Creek on July 4, 1796, which they named Port Independence. Nearby Native Americans were upset at the encroachment on their land, but they were appeased with gifts of beads and whiskey and allowed the surveys to proceed.

General Cleaveland coasted along the shore with a surveying party and landed at the mouth of the Cuyahoga River on July 22, 1796. He ascended the bank and determined that the spot was a favorable site for a city, with the river on the west and Lake Erie on the north. He had it surveyed into town lots, and the employees named the place Cleaveland in his honor. There were four settlers the first year, and growth was slow initially, reaching only 150 inhabitants in 1820. Cleaveland went home to Connecticut after the 1796 expedition and never returned to Ohio or the city that bears his name. He died in Canterbury, Connecticut, where he is also buried, but a statue of him stands in the Cleveland Public Square.

The settlement of "Cleaveland" eventually became known as "Cleveland". One theory is that Cleaveland's surveying party misspelled the name on their original map. In the early 1800s a local newspaper, the Cleveland Advertiser, chose the "Cleveland" spelling, which was then adopted by the Cleveland Herald and the Cleveland Gazette. One explanation for the spelling change is that the newspaper dropped the letter because it wouldn't fit on is masthead, but that story is generally understood to be an urban myth.

== Moses Cleaveland Trees ==
Moses Cleaveland is not only remembered through the city's name but through living monuments in the form of trees throughout the Greater Cleveland area. As part of the 150-year anniversary of Moses Cleaveland's party coming to the mouth of the Cuyahoga River, Arthur B. Williams of the Cleveland Museum of Natural History proposed that trees should be identified and labeled if they were alive when Moses Cleaveland came to the region where the city would be. In 1946, 242 trees from 23 different tree species were nominated to become an official Moses Cleaveland Tree.

Each tree's age was verified, and the list of Moses Cleaveland Trees was reduced to 150 trees that were accessible to the public. Each tree was fashioned with a commemorative metal plaque that identified it as one of the Moses Cleaveland Trees. Since this project began in 1946, more trees have been designated as Moses Cleaveland Trees in part due to some of the first designated trees dying. There are around 270 Moses Cleaveland Trees as of 2024.

== Commemorations ==
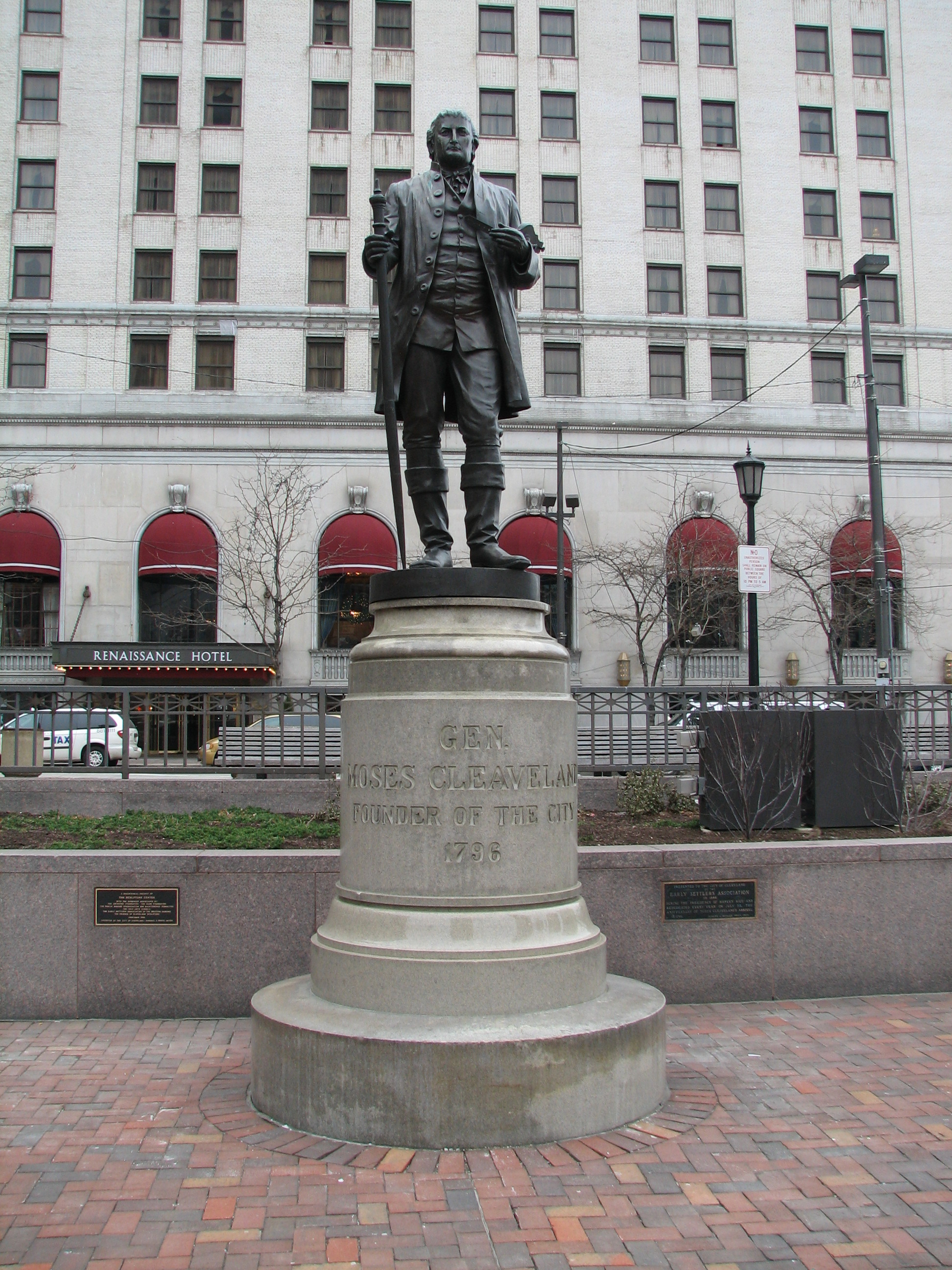
Gen. Moses Cleaveland statue sculpted by James G. C. Hamilton located on Public Square in downtown Cleveland.

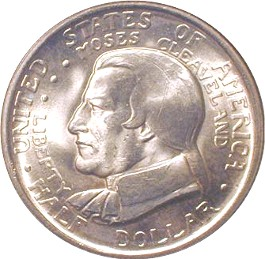
1936 commemorative Cleveland Centennial half dollar issued at the Great Lakes Exposition

== Resources ==
- "Moses Cleaveland". Ohio History Central.
- "Cleaveland, Moses" at the Encyclopedia of Cleveland History
