= Statue of John Mason =

Statue in Windsor, Connecticut, U.S.

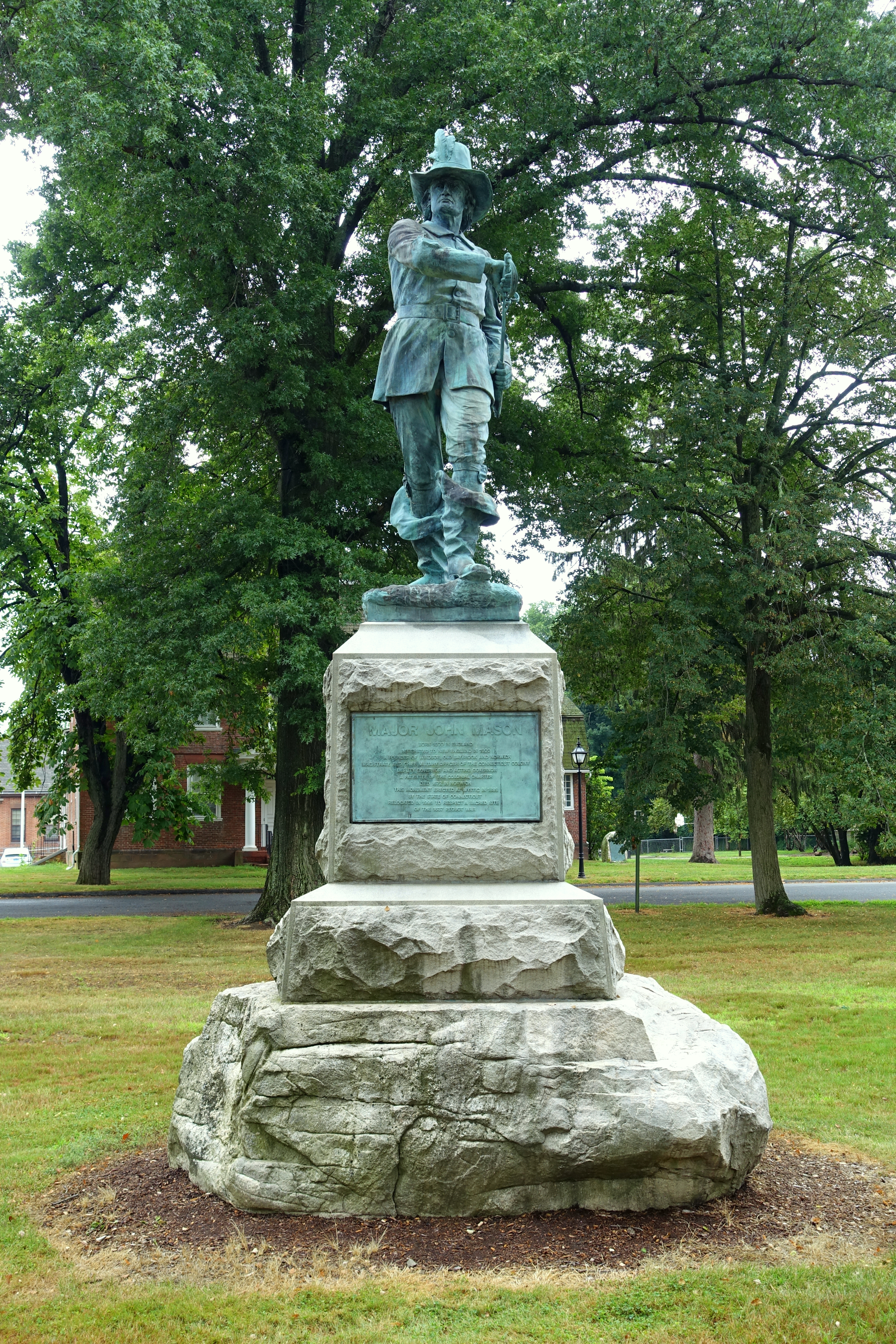
- The statue in 2016
- Artist: James G. C. Hamilton
- Subject: John Mason
- Location: Windsor, Connecticut, U.S.; 41.85803°N 72.63663°W

A statue of John Mason is installed in Windsor, Connecticut, United States. The memorial is slated for removal, as of July 2020. As of January 2024, it has yet to be removed. The sculptor was James G. C. Hamilton.

== See also ==
- List of monuments and memorials removed during the George Floyd protests
