= Viet D. Dinh =

American lawyer (born 1968)

Viet Dinh
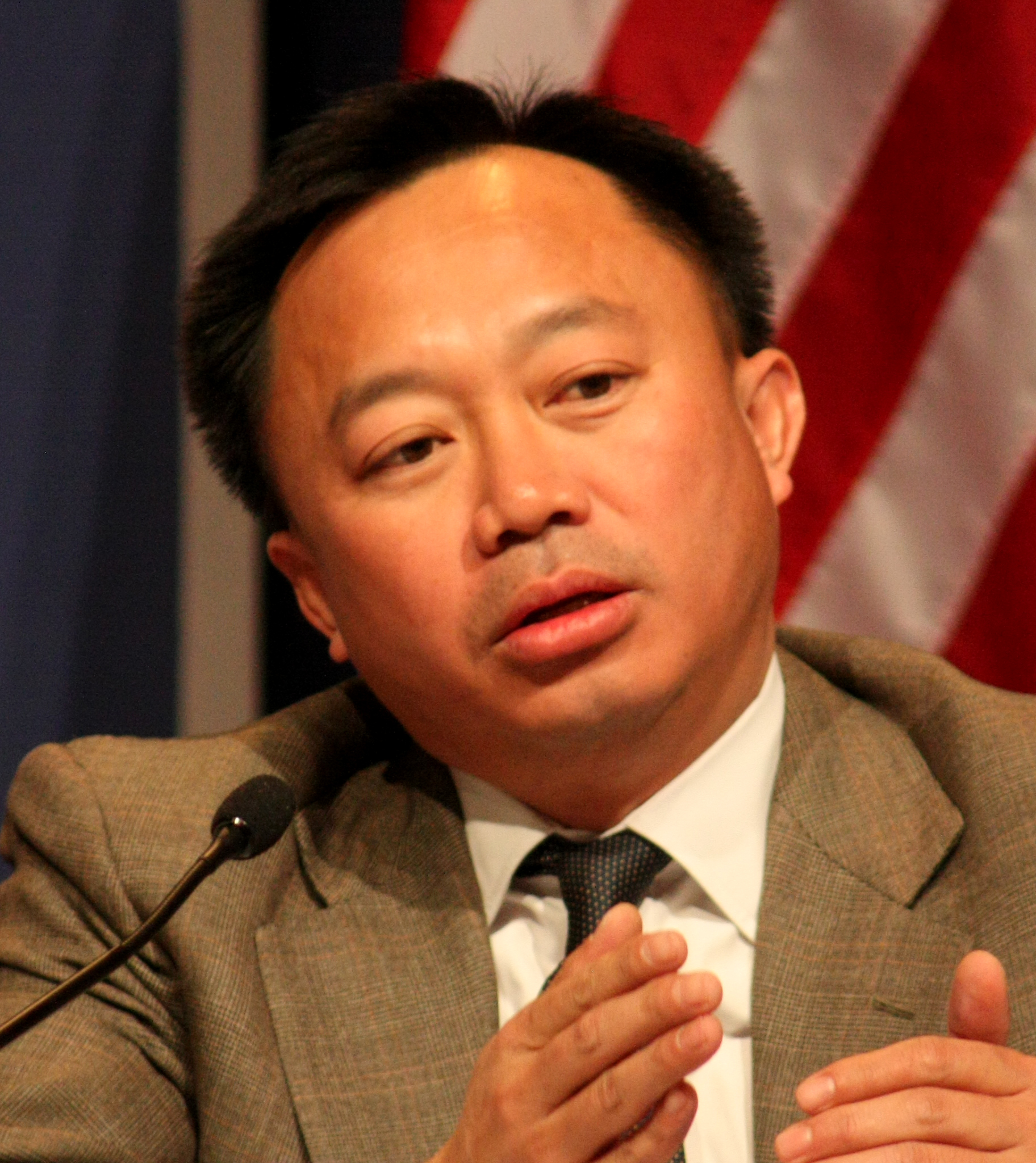

United States Assistant Attorney General for the Office of Legal Policy
- In office May 31, 2001 – May 31, 2003
- President: George W. Bush
- Preceded by: Eleanor D. Acheson
- Succeeded by: Daniel Bryant

Personal details
- Born: Đinh Đồng Phụng Việt; February 22, 1968 (age 58) Saigon, South Vietnam (now Ho Chi Minh City, Vietnam)
- Party: Republican
- Education: Harvard University (BA, JD)

Viet D. Dinh (Vietnamese: Đinh Đồng Phụng Việt; born February 22, 1968) is a Vietnamese-born American legal scholar who is on the board of Strategic Education. He was also the Chief Legal and Policy Officer of Fox Corporation where he leads all legal, government and regulatory and government affairs. He served as an Assistant Attorney General of the United States from 2001 to 2003, under the presidency of George W. Bush. Previously, Dinh was a partner at two leading law firms, Kirkland & Ellis LLP and Bancroft PLLC, the latter of which he founded. Born in Saigon, in former South Vietnam, he was a major contributor to the Patriot Act and is a former member of the Board of Directors of News Corporation.

== Early life and education ==
Dinh was born in Saigon, South Vietnam. He and his family emigrated to the United States in 1978, three years after Vietnam had fully embraced communism. They initially settled in Portland, Oregon, but moved to Fullerton, California, two years later. Dinh joined the restarted debate team at Fullerton Union High School under coaches Gary Reed and Jacqueline Reedy as a senior, who encouraged him to apply to Harvard University.

Dinh graduated magna cum laude from Harvard University in 1990 with a B.A. in government and economics. While at Harvard, he was a member of the Phoenix S.K. Club. He then attended Harvard Law School, where he was a Class Marshal, an Olin Research Fellow in Law and Economics, and Bluebook editor of the Harvard Law Review. He received his Juris Doctor (J.D.) magna cum laude in 1993.

== Career ==
=== Law ===
After graduating from law school, Dinh served as a law clerk to Judge Laurence H. Silberman of the U.S. Court of Appeals for the D.C. Circuit and to U.S. Supreme Court Justice Sandra Day O'Connor during the 1994 Term.

Dinh has served as Associate Special Counsel to the U.S. Senate Whitewater Committee, as Special Counsel to Senator Pete V. Domenici for the Impeachment Trial of President Bill Clinton, and as counsel to the Special Master in re Austrian and German Bank Holocaust Litigation.

He is a member of the District of Columbia and Supreme Court bars.

In late 2003, he was one of a group of prominent U.S. security officials hired by ChoicePoint to advise the company on developing its government homeland security contracts.

In 2006 he joined Kenneth Starr in challenging the constitutionality of the Sarbanes–Oxley Act.

Dinh currently serves on or has served on the boards of the News Corporation, The Orchard Enterprises, Inc. (NASDAQ; ORCD), Liberty's Promise, the American Judicature Society, the Transition Committee for California Governor Arnold Schwarzenegger, the Section on National Security Law of the Association of American Law Schools, the ABA Section on Administrative Law, Revlon, LPL Financial, and McAndrews and Forbes Worldwide.

Dinh has taught at Georgetown University Law Center, and became a partner at Kirkland & Ellis in September 2016, when Kirkland hired all of the attorneys at the firm Dinh founded, Bancroft PLLC. Dinh left Kirkland in 2018.

Dinh's representative publications include "Defending Liberty: Terrorism and Human Rights" in the Helsinki Monitor, "Codetermination and Corporate Governance in a Multinational Business Enterprise" in the Journal of Corporation Law, and "Financial Sector Reform and Economic Development in Vietnam" in Law and Policy in International Business. He published The USA Patriot Act: Preserving Life and Liberty in 2008.

In September 2006 Dinh received publicity for representing Tom Perkins, a former Hewlett-Packard director involved in the company's pretexting scandal. The emails between Perkins and Larry Sonsini, a corporate lawyer involved with Board of Directors decisions for many corporations were eventually forwarded to reporters and became public.

Dinh, along with fellow News Corp. board member, fellow lawyer, and Corporation executive Joel Klein, took over the investigation of the News of the World phone hacking affair and related Corporation issues in July, 2011, from News International UK Chief Executive, Rebekah Brooks. Brooks' own possible involvement in the phone hacking scandal made her unable to continue as an impartial investigator. Tom Perkins, also on the News Corp. board, was one who recommended Dinh for the investigation role.

It emerged after he was appointed to the board investigation that Dinh is godfather to one of Lachlan Murdoch's children and a friend of Lachlan since 2003. Further, in 1992, a decade before he met Lachlan, Dinh wrote of his sister, held in a Hong Kong refugee camp, in the New York Times, which led to NBC TV coverage and then to a series of articles in the South China Morning Post. The Post was owned by Rupert Murdoch, and Dinh's articles there were credited with helping free his sister. The personal ties to Murdoch's interests and family were debated as Dinh took the role in the phone-hacking investigation.

Dinh was mentioned as a potential nominee to the Supreme Court of the United States in a Republican administration.

In September 2026, Dinh joined the law firm Sullivan & Cromwell as an advisor.

=== Department of Justice ===
Dinh served as Assistant Attorney General of the Office of Legal Policy at the Department of Justice from 2001 to 2003, under the presidency of George W. Bush. He was confirmed in the Senate by a vote of 96 to 1, with the sole No vote coming from Hillary Clinton. As the official responsible for federal legal policy, Dinh worked with issues of illicit drugs, racial profiling in federal law enforcement, exploitation of children, human trafficking, DNA technology, gun violence, and civil and criminal justice procedural reform. Dinh was also involved in the selection and confirmation of 100 district and 23 appellate judges in his role representing the U.S. Department of Justice. After 9/11, Dinh conducted a comprehensive review of DOJ priorities, policies, and practices, and played a key role in developing the USA PATRIOT Act and revising the Attorney General's Guidelines, which govern federal law enforcement activities and national security investigations.

=== Georgetown University Law Center ===
Dinh has been a Professor of Law at Georgetown University Law Center. His expertise lies in constitutional law, corporations law, and the law and economics of development. He was also currently the Co-Director of the Asian Law & Policy Studies Program. He previously served as Co-Director of the Joint Program in Law and Business Administration, from 1998 to 1999.

=== Fox Corporation ===
In September 2018, Dinh was appointed as Chief Legal and Policy Officer of Fox Corporation and would report directly to CEO Lachlan Murdoch. Dinh is responsible for all legal, compliance, and regulatory matters, as well as oversight of government and public affairs.

In April 2020, it was announced that Dinh and a handful of other Fox Corp. executives would forgo their salaries for six months as a result of the COVID-19 pandemic.

On August 11, 2023, Fox announced that Dinh would be leaving the company's employ and become an outside advisor.

== Personal life ==
His family was separated in 1975 when his father, Phong Dinh, was being held as a political prisoner in the family's war-ravaged homeland after the fall of Saigon. He escaped in 1978, and remained a fugitive in Vietnam, when his mother, Nga Thu Nguyễn, and his older siblings got on a boat with 85 other people and set out. For 12 days Dinh was in a broken 15-foot-long boat, at one point with no food or water. They encountered a Thai fishing crew that gave them food and gas, and helped fix the boat and pointed them toward land. When they reached Malaysia they were met by gunshots from a patrol boat; the Malaysians did not want them. Their boat docked but Dinh's mother realized that the port police would force them to leave the next morning, so she sneaked back out to the boat alone that night with an axe and damaged the boat so as not to be sent back on it. After six months as refugees in Malaysia, Dinh's family arrived at Oregon in November 1978. They picked strawberries for menial wages, sending money back to Dinh's father and a sibling hiding out in Vietnam. After Mount St. Helens erupted in 1980, the crop damage forced his family to relocate to Fullerton.

Dinh was honored by his high school alma mater when he was added to Fullerton's wall of fame. He will share that wall with an ideological opposite, David Boies, former Vice President Al Gore's lawyer for the Florida recount.

Dinh was reunited with his father in 1982. In 1992, he was reunited with one of his sisters at a refugee camp in Hong Kong, a meeting filmed by the newsmagazine show Dateline NBC.

Dinh lives in Los Angeles, California, with his wife, Jennifer Ashworth Dinh, and their three sons.

== Articles, interviews, and testimony ==
- Pincus, Walter (2006-02-14). "Former Official Backs Lobbyists in Leak Case". Washington Post.
- Milbank, Dana (2006-02-11). "Bob Barr, Bane of the Right?". Washington Post.
- "The Patriot Act and Privacy Issues" (PDF). Hardball with Chris Matthews (Transcript). 2006-02-02. Archived from the original (PDF) on 2006-05-18.
- "The Patriot Act and Privacy Issues" (PDF). Hardball with Chris Matthews (Transcript). 2006-01-13. Archived from the original (PDF) on 2006-05-18.
- "Congress Has Jurisdiction on Hawaiians" (PDF). Honolulu Advertiser. 2005-11-01. Archived from the original (PDF) on 2006-03-19.
- "Enough Already" (PDF). Wall Street Journal. 2005-10-27. Archived from the original (PDF) on 2006-05-05.
- "Candor Needs Privacy" (PDF). USA Today. 2005-07-27. Archived from the original (PDF) on 2006-03-19.
- "Roberts Reviewed". Slate. July 2005.
- "Justice O'Connor's Indelible Stamp" (PDF). Washington Post. 2005-07-03. Archived from the original (PDF) on 2006-03-19.
- "No Place to Hide". Washington Post. 2005-02-18.
- Dinh, Viet D. (2004-12-19). "Detentions Are Appropriate". USA Today.
- "The Patriot Act Is Your Friend", Interview with Kim Zetter, Wired News, 2004-02-24
- "Justice for All" (PDF). Wall Street Journal. 2003-12-15. Archived from the original (PDF) on 2006-03-19.
- "Let Justice Take Its Course" (PDF). New York Times. 2003-10-02. Archived from the original (PDF) on 2006-05-18.
- "No Place to Hide". American RadioWorks.
- "Sacrifices of Security", Interview with Bryant Gumbel, PBS, 2003-07-15
- "At Home in War on Terror". Los Angeles Times. 2002-09-18. Archived from the original on 2006-05-21.
- "Once Upon a Time in Arkansas", Interview with Peter Boyer, Frontline, PBS, 1988

== See also ==
- List of law clerks for the eighth seat of the Supreme Court of the United States
- George W. Bush Supreme Court candidates

Legal offices
Preceded by Eleanor Acheson	Assistant Attorney General for the Office of Legal Policy; 2001–2003	Succeeded by Daniel Bryant
