= Red Jacket Mural =

The Red Jacket Mural, painted by Caine Mahoney (also known as Kean Mahaney or Kean Mahony), is a historical mural that once adorned the residence of Judge Theodore Hulett in Niagara Falls, New York. The mural, which dates back to the late 1800s, is a significant piece of local art history, reflecting the culture and heritage of the Niagara region. In 1958, under the coordination with the Niagara Falls Historical Society, the mural was rescued from the residence and displayed in various locations in the region. The current whereabouts of the mural are unknown, and it is believed to have been lost during a building renovation.

The life-size mural was painted above the fireplace in the home of Judge Theodore Hulett in Niagara Falls, New York. It was painted by Caine Mahoney in the late 1800s as payment for legal work performed by Judge Hulett. The painting portrays the Indian chief dressed in full tribal regalia, standing on a slight elevation in the foreground with Niagara Falls as the backdrop. Prominently displayed is a replica of the medal given to Red Jacket by George Washington, which hangs from a chain around his neck. The medal was awarded to him in recognition of his support for American colonists.

At some point between the late 1800s and 1939, the mural was covered with wallpaper, and the Hulett residence was sold. In 1939, Charles H. Piper, the great-grandson of Judge Hulett visited the location of the Hulett residence which was now the Marconi restaurant. While at the restaurant, Mr. Piper mentioned to the staff that there used to be a mural above the fireplace. Mr. Piper proceeded to scratch away some of the wallpaper with his penknife to reveal a very small section of the painting. Casore Polidori, the restaurant owner, had the wallpaper carefully removed, revealing the entire painting.

19 years later, in 1958, the building housing the mural (referred to then as the former Alps restaurant) was scheduled to be demolished. Saul C. Weinstein, president of the Frontier Salvage Corp., and responsible for the building demolition, along with Anthone Patrone, property owner, encouraged anyone with the means to do so, to rescue the mural. However, since the mural was painted on plaster over brick it would be a difficult task. Additionally, there was a 10-day deadline.

Hearing of the issue of the mural, a local artist, Arthur F. Barbezat, who came to this country in 1950 from Fleurier, Switzerland, volunteered to attempt to save the mural. Mr. Barbezat, a landscape artist and decorator, had experience in salvaging murals painted directly on walls in Europe. Mr. Barbezat coordinated with Miss Marjorie Williams, executive vice president of the Niagara Falls Historical Society and city historian to ensure the mural would have a home once rescued.

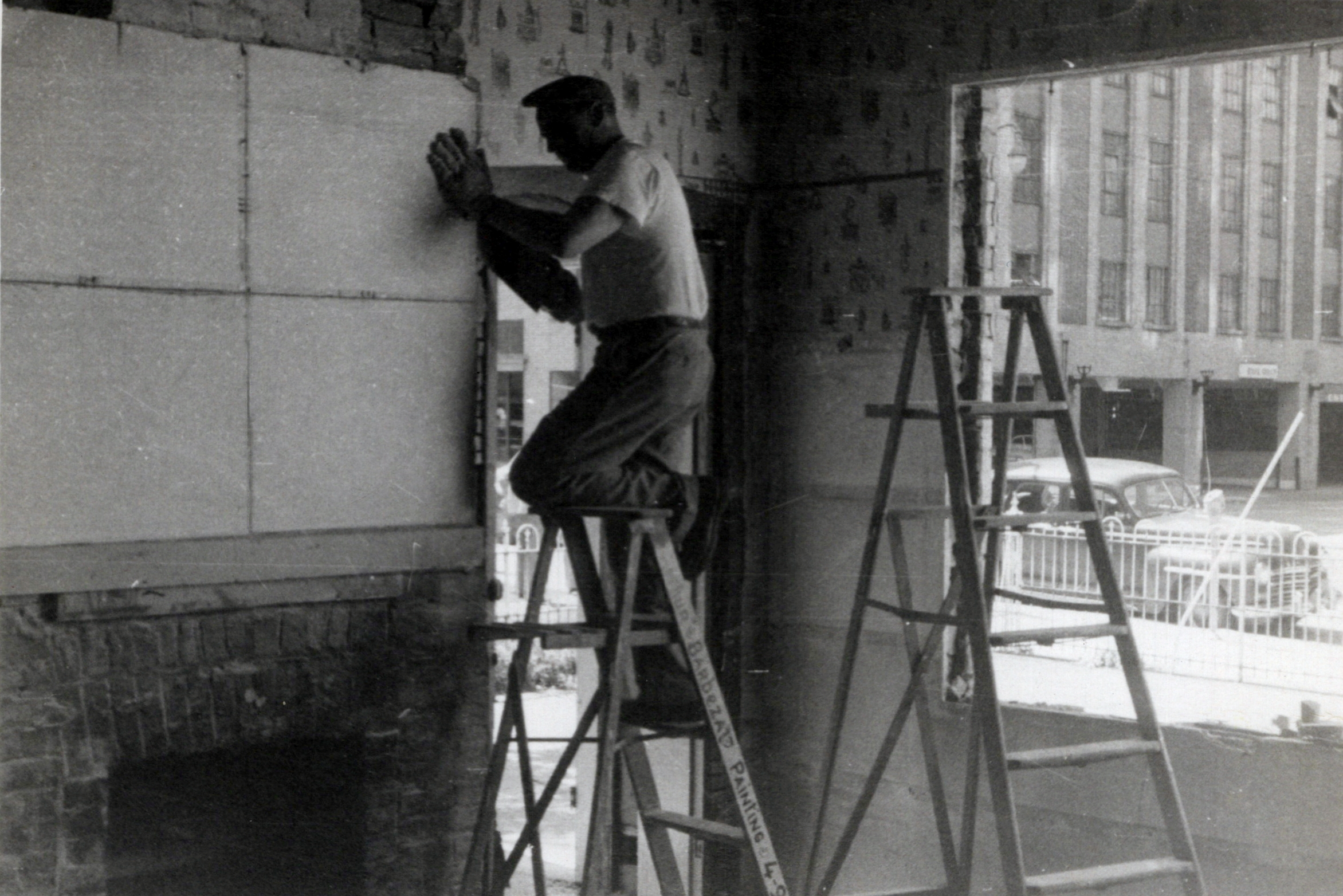
Arthur Barbezat removing Red Jacket mural from wall

The process of removing the mural from the wall was time-consuming as it could not be removed in one piece. The mural was divided into seven sections and each section was sawed off the brick chimney by hand. Mr. Barbezat worked night and day to carefully extract each section. The extraction was successful but now the mural would require restoration before being available for display.

Mr. Barbezat cemented the sections of the mural back together in a frame. And then used his skills as a painter/muralist himself to touch up the areas that were affected by the sectioning. The completed mural was presented to the Niagara Falls Historical Society which planned to exhibit the painting at hotels and public buildings. Example display locations in Niagara Falls, NY are Marine Trust Co. in 1958, and the old No. 2 police station in 1965.

The mural's current location remains unknown, and it is thought to have been lost during the demolition of the No. 2 police station along with other large pieces of Niagara Falls, New York history.
