= John Mix Stanley =

American artist (1814–1872)

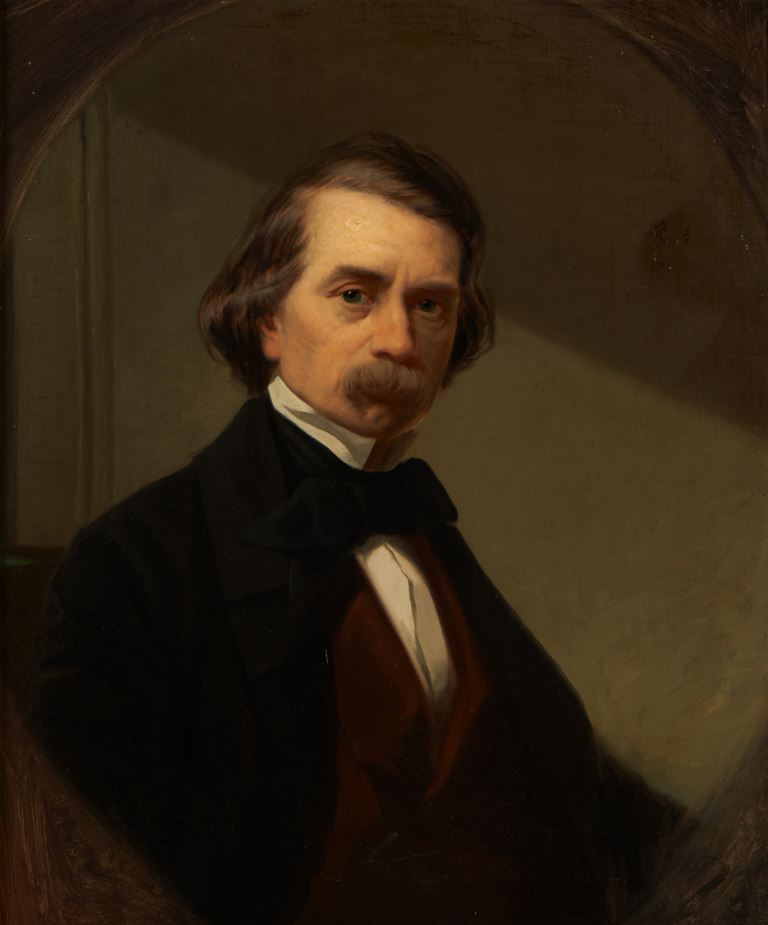
- Oil on canvas self-portrait, c. 1860
- Born: January 17, 1814; Canandaigua, New York, U.S.
- Died: April 10, 1872 (aged 58); Detroit, Michigan, U.S.
- Known for: Painting
- Spouse: Alice C. English (m. 1854)
- Children: 5
- Relatives: Alice Acheson (granddaughter); David Campion Acheson (great-grandson)

John Mix Stanley (January 17, 1814 – April 10, 1872) was an artist-explorer, an American painter of landscapes, and Native American portraits and tribal life. Born in the Finger Lakes region of New York, he started painting signs and portraits as a young man. In 1842 he traveled to the American West to paint Native American life. In 1846 he exhibited a gallery of 85 of his paintings in Cincinnati and Louisville. During the Mexican–American War, he joined Colonel Stephen Watts Kearney's expedition to California and painted accounts of the campaign, as well as aspects of the Oregon Territory.

Stanley continued to travel and paint in the West, and mounted a major exhibit of more than 150 works at the Smithsonian Institution in 1852. Although he had some Congressional interest in purchasing the collection, he was unsuccessful in completing a sale to the government. He never recovered his expenses for a decade of intensive work and travel.

In 1854 he exhibited a 42-scene panorama of western scenes in Washington, DC; Baltimore, New York and London, but it has been lost. More than 200 of his paintings, maps and other work being held at the Smithsonian were lost in an 1865 fire. The irreparable loss of most of his works caused the eclipse of Stanley's reputation for some time in American art history. His appreciation and portrayal of the American West is valued, and today his few surviving works are held by national and numerous regional museums.

== Early life and education ==
John Mix Stanley was born in Canandaigua, New York, to Seth and Sally (McKinney) Stanley. He was orphaned at the age of 12. At age 14, Stanley was apprenticed to a coach maker. He taught himself painting skills, and at the age of 20 moved to Detroit, the largest city in the Michigan Territory, and started doing itinerant work.

== Career ==
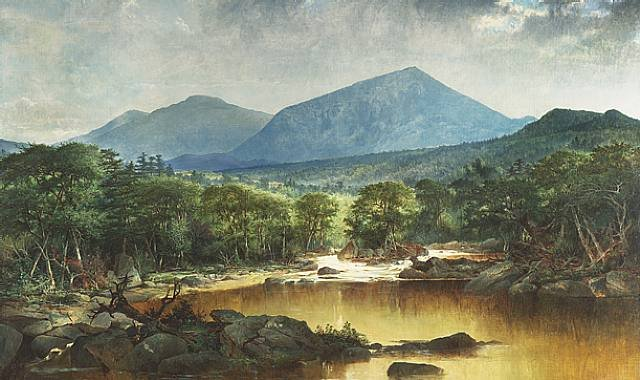
River in a Mountain Landscape, oil on canvas painting by John Mix Stanley, c. 1840s

Stanley moved to what was considered the frontier town of Detroit in 1832, where he became an itinerant painter of signs and portraits. He traveled also to Fort Snelling, Galena and Chicago. In the latter part of the decade, he returned East, apparently to Washington, D.C., where he briefly had a studio.

In 1842, accompanied by Sumner Dickerman of Troy, New York, as an assistant, Stanley went to the American Southwest expressly to paint Native Americans, perhaps inspired by the work of the artist George Catlin. They settled at Fort Gibson in Indian Territory (present-day Oklahoma); the community was a crossroads of many Indian nations. In the summer of 1843, Stanley went to the council at Tahlequah called by the Cherokee chief John Ross and the Republic of Texas. An estimated 10,000 Native Americans of 17 tribes attended to negotiate peace with Texas, as did many European Americans. Stanley spent four weeks there and worked intensely through the next three months to complete his numerous paintings of individuals and tribal groups. He also spent more time with Cherokee and Creek groups, painting portraits. That fall he accompanied the party of the US Indian agent Pierce M. Butler to a council with Comanche and other Plains Indians, probably in southwest Oklahoma near present-day Texas. In early 1846 in Cincinnati, Ohio, he and Dickerman exhibited a gallery of 85 paintings of Indians, which received favorable reviews there and in Louisville, Kentucky. Stanley left Dickerman in charge and returned to the West.

At the outbreak of the Mexican War in 1846, Stanley was appointed a draftsman for the Corps of Topographical Engineers to Colonel Stephen Watts Kearney's expedition to California and the Oregon Territory. He produced many sketches and paintings of the campaign, making more finished paintings after reaching San Francisco in early 1847. Some works were reproduced as engravings. He traveled further north to the Oregon and Washington territories to paint landscapes and various Native American tribes, and worked through part of 1848.

That year Stanley traveled to Hawaii, where he spent nearly twelve months painting portraits of King Kamehameha III, his wife, and the royal family. After his return to the East, he organized his large gallery of Indian portraits and paintings to be mounted in several cities, including New York. In 1852, he gained a major exhibit in Washington, DC, at the Smithsonian Institution of his Native American Gallery, which attracted much attention in the city. As he noted in the preface to the catalogue published by the Smithsonian, Stanley portrayed 43 tribes. His paintings represented a decade of work, with extensive travel in the West and the Hawaiian Islands. His collection numbered nearly 200 works and was celebrated at the time. Seth Eastman, also an artist of Native American life, wrote to Stanley of his gallery: "that I consider the artistic merits of yours far superior to Mr. Catlin's; and they give a better idea of the Indian than any works in Mr. Catlin's collection." Stanley interested members of the US Senate Committee on Indian Affairs in purchasing his gallery, but could not gain approval; and the Smithsonian did not have sufficient funds to purchase it. He struggled financially, trying to keep his collection together in hopes of gaining Congressional support, rather than sell it privately.

In 1853, Stanley was appointed chief artist at a salary of $125 per month for Isaac I. Stevens' expedition to survey a northern railroad route to the Pacific Coast; he made the most of this chance for travel and work in the Northwest. They traveled from St. Paul Minnesota Territory, to the Washington Territory. Stanley observed gatherings of nearly 1,500 Assiniboine, traveled to a distant Blackfoot (Piegan) village, and saw a large hunting party of several hundred, including families from the Pembina area near the Canada–US border.

The latter were known as the Red River of the North hunters. They were generations of European and mixed-race trappers who lived on the frontier and had Indian wives and mixed-race children. (In Canada, descendants of such families have achieved recognition as the Métis ethnic group.) They had come to the area for bison hunting, as the herds were still vast on the prairies. Stanley painted and sketched many Northwest landmarks, which were reproduced in lithographs for inclusion in Stevens' last volume of the Pacific Railroad Reports. These gained wide circulation and added to Stanley's reputation. His portraits of two early Oregon settlers are held by the Oregon Historical Society. Later in the West, he painted Comanche warriors in their natural environment. The party returned that year to the East, crossing the Isthmus of Panama from the west and arriving by ship in New York in January 1854.

After his return, Stanley worked intensely at painting and organizing a large panorama of western scenes from the northern survey route. His exhibition of 42 scenes went on display in Washington, DC, on September 1, 1854, accompanied by a 23-page booklet of descriptions. Visitors said they needed two hours to see everything in the panorama. This exhibit represented the last of Stanley's great western adventures and was highly praised by Washington papers. It was shown in Baltimore for three weeks, and went on tour to New York and London. The panorama later disappeared, and historians have not been able to trace it.

Stanley returned to Detroit in 1864, where he set up his art studio. He essentially remained in Detroit the rest of his life, helping to found a forerunner of the Detroit Institute of Arts and its School of Arts. He also helped incorporate the National Gallery of Art in Washington, DC; originally he had hoped his Indian gallery would be the basis of its collection. More than 200 of his works, as well as many of his maps and other documentation, were destroyed in the Smithsonian fire of 1865.

=== Indian atlas ===
Stanley intended to produce an atlas of the American Indian but, after the loss of most of his paintings in 1865, never completed it. Only eight leaves exist. Probably written in the winter of 1868–1869, these include his preface, as well as pages describing three plates: a Plains Indian encampment, Chinook burial ground, and a buffalo hunt. Stanley described what the plates represent and also provided historical and cultural information about each tribe or area.

=== Maps ===
As an artist-explorer, Stanley had traveled extensively, especially in the American West. He created a large collection of maps, which was held by the Smithsonian Institution. They were also destroyed in the 1865 fire.

== Paintings of Native Americans ==
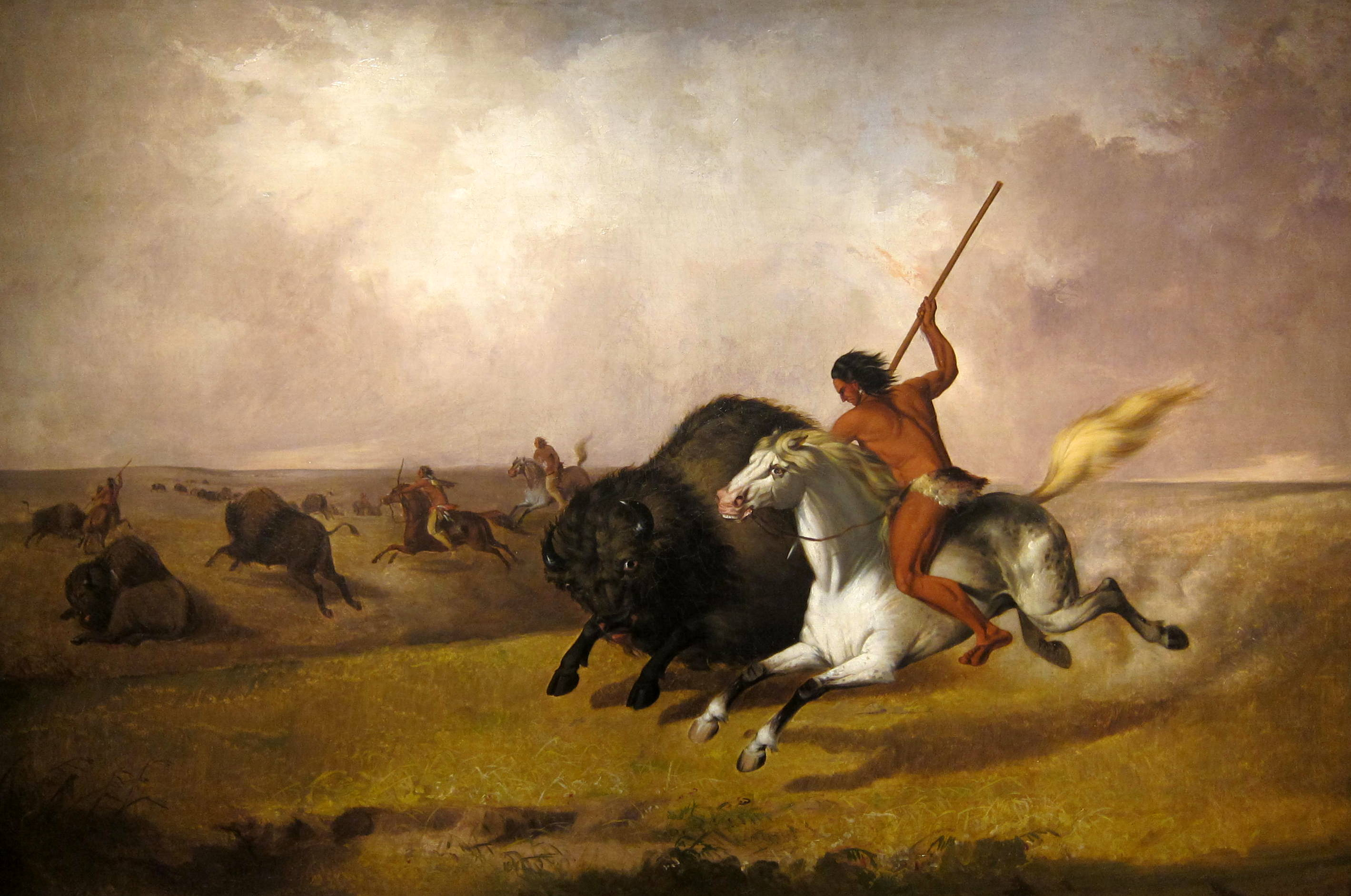
Buffalo Hunt on the Southwestern Prairies, 1845, Smithsonian American Art Museum

Stanley's primary interest and sympathies were with the American Indians. The Smithsonian had a large and successful exhibit of his paintings in 1852, but Congress never appropriated monies to acquire them. More than 200 of his works, as well as many of his maps and other documentation, were destroyed in the Smithsonian fire of 1865. This loss likely contributed to the decline in his reputation and lack of knowledge about him in later American art history.

His surviving works are held by national museums as well as numerous regional institutions: National:

- Corcoran Gallery of Art (Washington, D.C.),
- Metropolitan Museum of Art (New York City),
- National Gallery of Art, (Washington, D.C.),
- National Portrait Gallery (Washington, D.C.), and
- Smithsonian American Art Museum (Washington, D.C.)

Regional:

- Amon Carter Museum (Fort Worth, Texas),
- Arizona State University Art Museum (Tempe, Arizona),
- Buffalo History Museum (Buffalo, NY),
- Buffalo Bill Historical Center (Cody, Wyoming),
- Denver Art Museum,
- Detroit Institute of Arts,
- Eiteljorg Museum of American Indians & Western Art (Indianapolis, Indiana),
- Galena Historical Museum (Galena, Illinois),
- Gilcrease Museum (Tulsa, Oklahoma),
- Honolulu Museum of Art,
- Joslyn Art Museum (Omaha, Nebraska),
- National Museum of Wildlife Art (Jackson Hole, Wyoming),
- Phoenix Art Museum (Phoenix, Arizona),
- https://www.120nhiggins.com Relic Gallery (Missoula, Montana),
- Rockwell Museum (Corning, New York),
- Stark Museum of Art (Orange, Texas),
- University of Arizona Museum of Art (Tucson, Arizona),
- University of Michigan Museum of Art (Ann Arbor, Michigan),
- Westervelt Warner Museum of American Art (Tuscaloosa, Alabama),
- William L. Clements Library (University of Michigan, Ann Arbor, Michigan),
- Worcester Art Museum (Worcester, Maine), and
- Yale University Art Gallery (New Haven, Connecticut).

=== Works ===
- Stanley, John Mix and Sumner Dickerman (1846), Catalogue: North American Indian Portrait Gallery; J. M. Stanley, Artist (Cincinnati)
- Stanley, John Mix (1852), Preface and Catalogue: Portraits of North American Indians, with Sketches of Scenery, Washington, D.C.: Smithsonian Institution.
- Stanley (1870), "Atlas of American Indians: Proof Sheets", Ithaca, NY: Cornell University Kroch Library Rare & Manuscripts, Archives.

=== Exhibitions ===
Stanley's art was celebrated in an exhibition entitled "Painted Journeys-The Art of John Mix Stanley" that opened June 2015 at the Buffalo Bill Center of the West in Cody, Wyoming. The exhibit contained more than 60 of Stanley's works from the 227 known to survive today. The exhibit traveled to the Gilcrease Museum in Tulsa, Oklahoma and Tacoma Art Museum in Tacoma, Washington.

== Marriage and family ==
Stanley married Alice C. English in 1854, when he was 40 and essentially finished with his western travels. They had five children together, two of whom died as infants. Their son, L. C. Stanley, published a biographical account of his father, entitled "John Mix Stanley, Artist-Explorer," in the 1924 Annual Report Smithsonian Institution, edited by David I. Bushnell, Jr. Another son, Louis Stanley, was a railroad lawyer who married Jane C. Stanley, a watercolorist. Their daughter, Stanley's granddaughter, was fellow artist and painter Alice Caroline Stanley (1895–1996), the wife of former Secretary of State Dean Acheson (1893–1971) and mother to David Campion Acheson (born 1921).

== Gallery ==
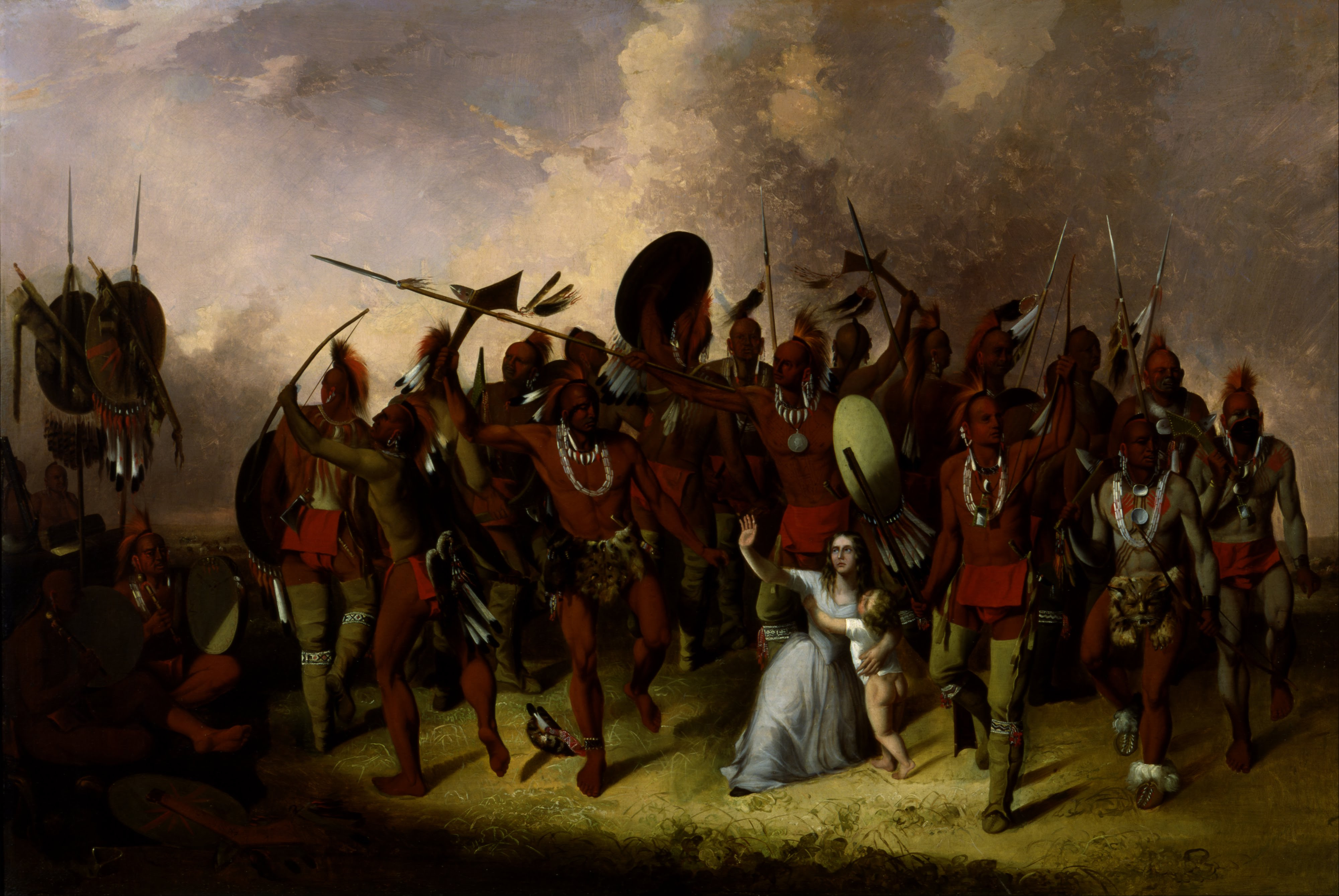
Osage Scalp Dance (1845)

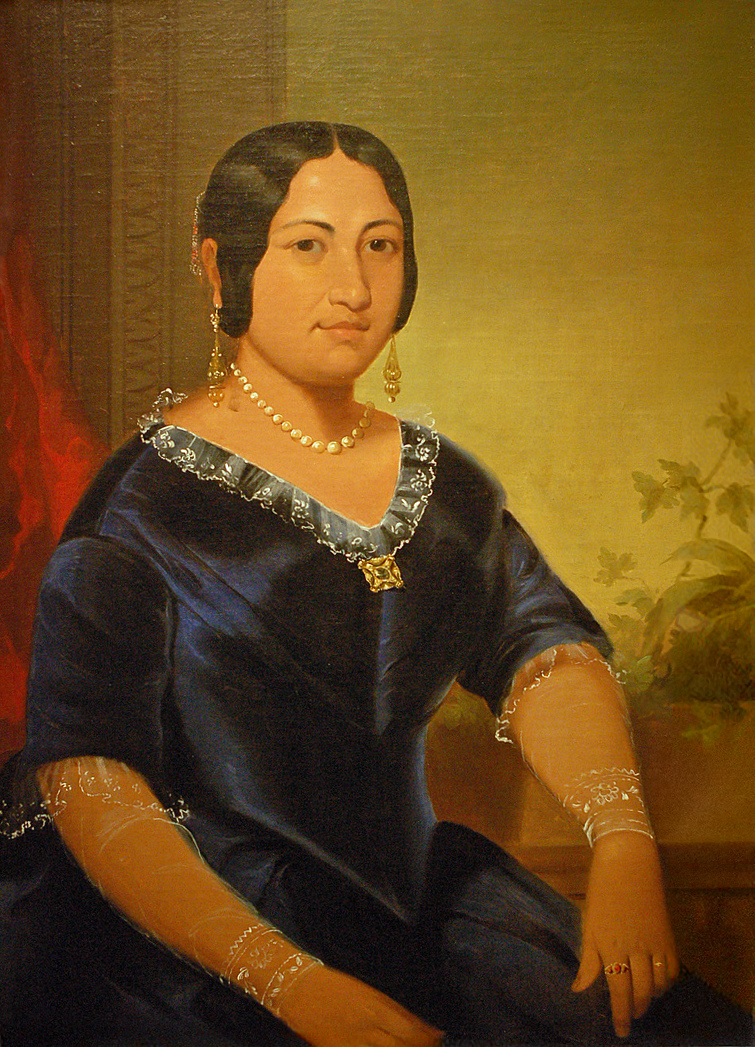
Portrait of Princess Manaiula Tehuiarii (c. 1848)

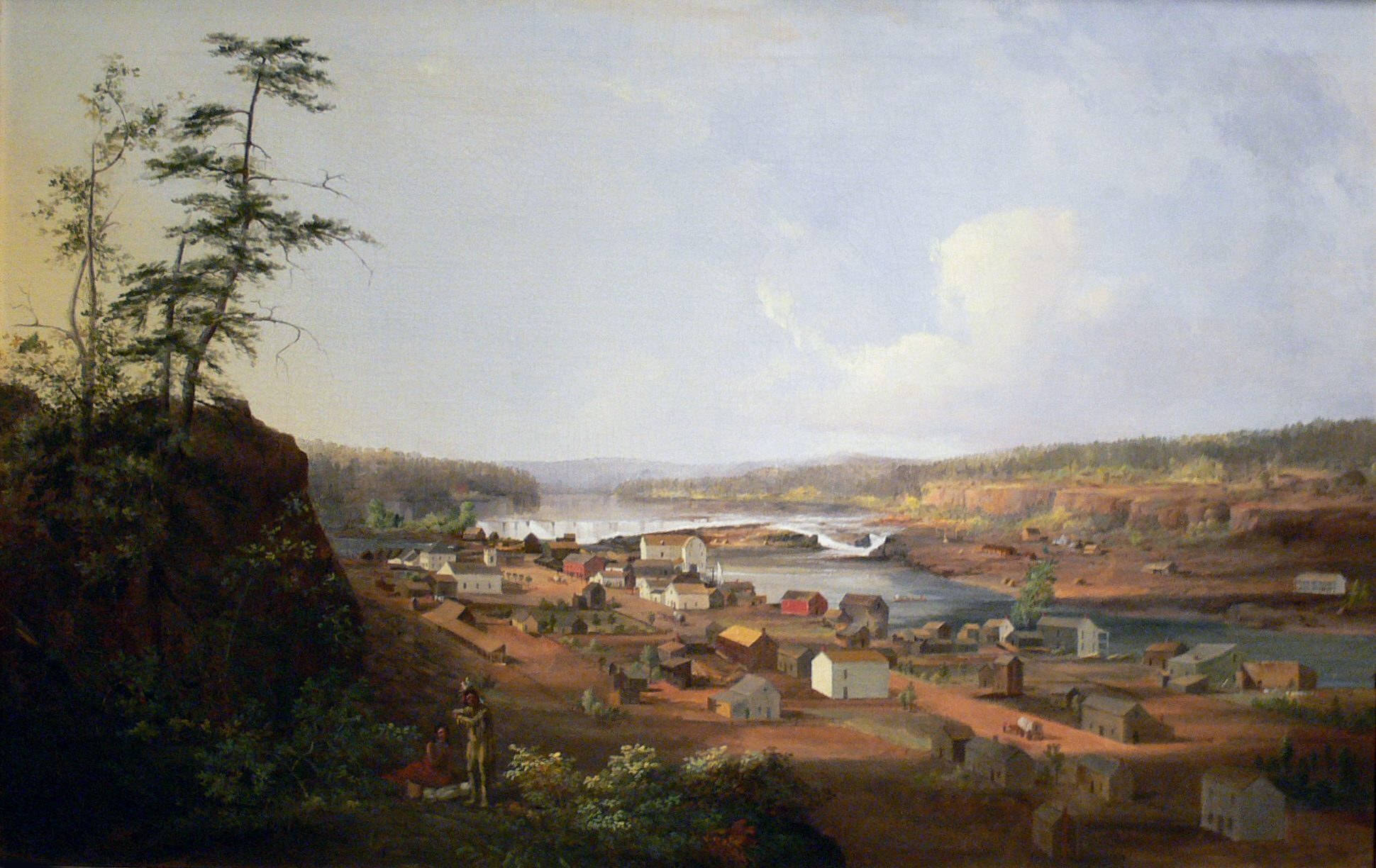
Oregon City on the Willamette River (1850–1852)

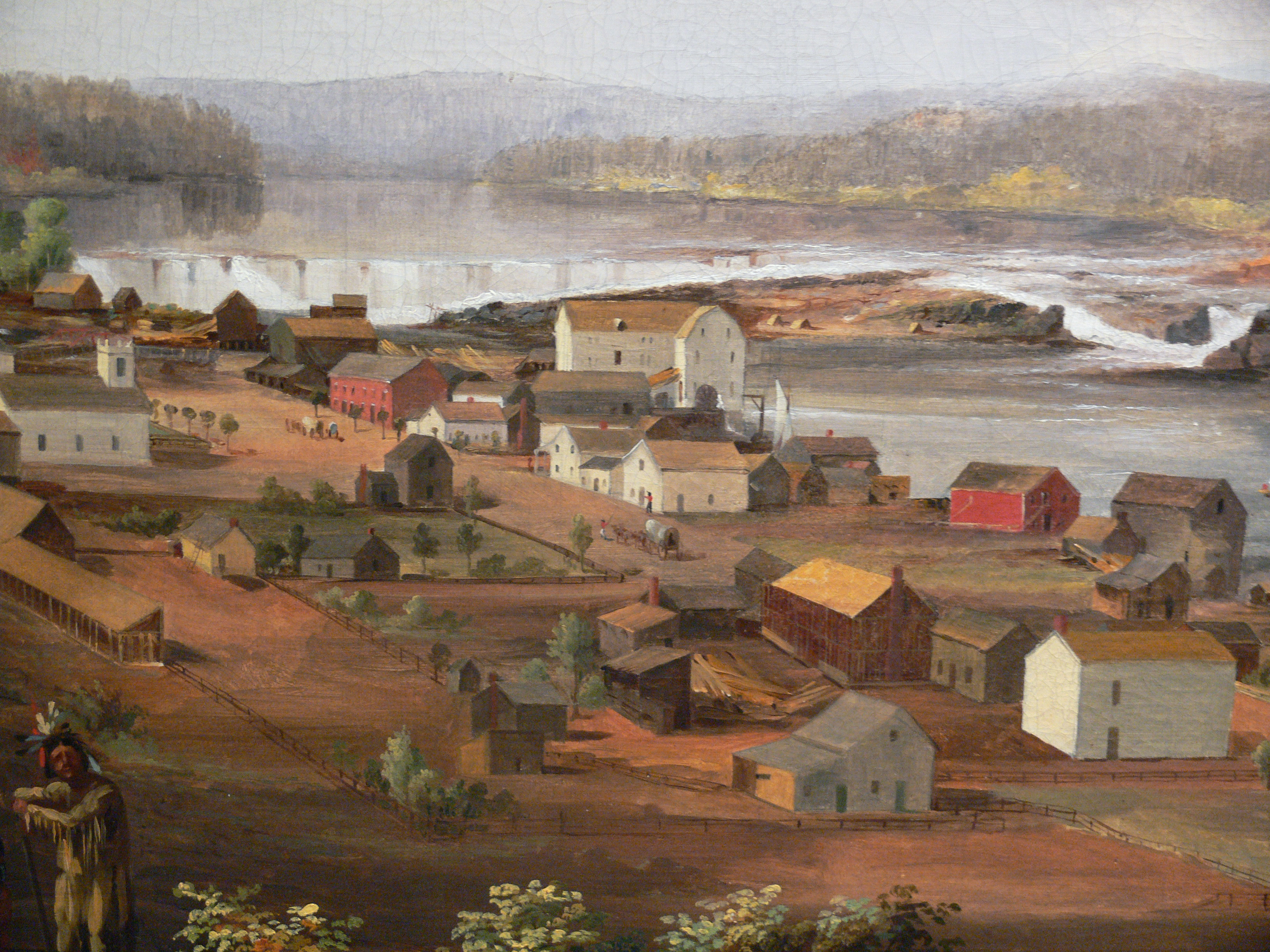
Oregon City on the Willamette River detail (1850–1852)

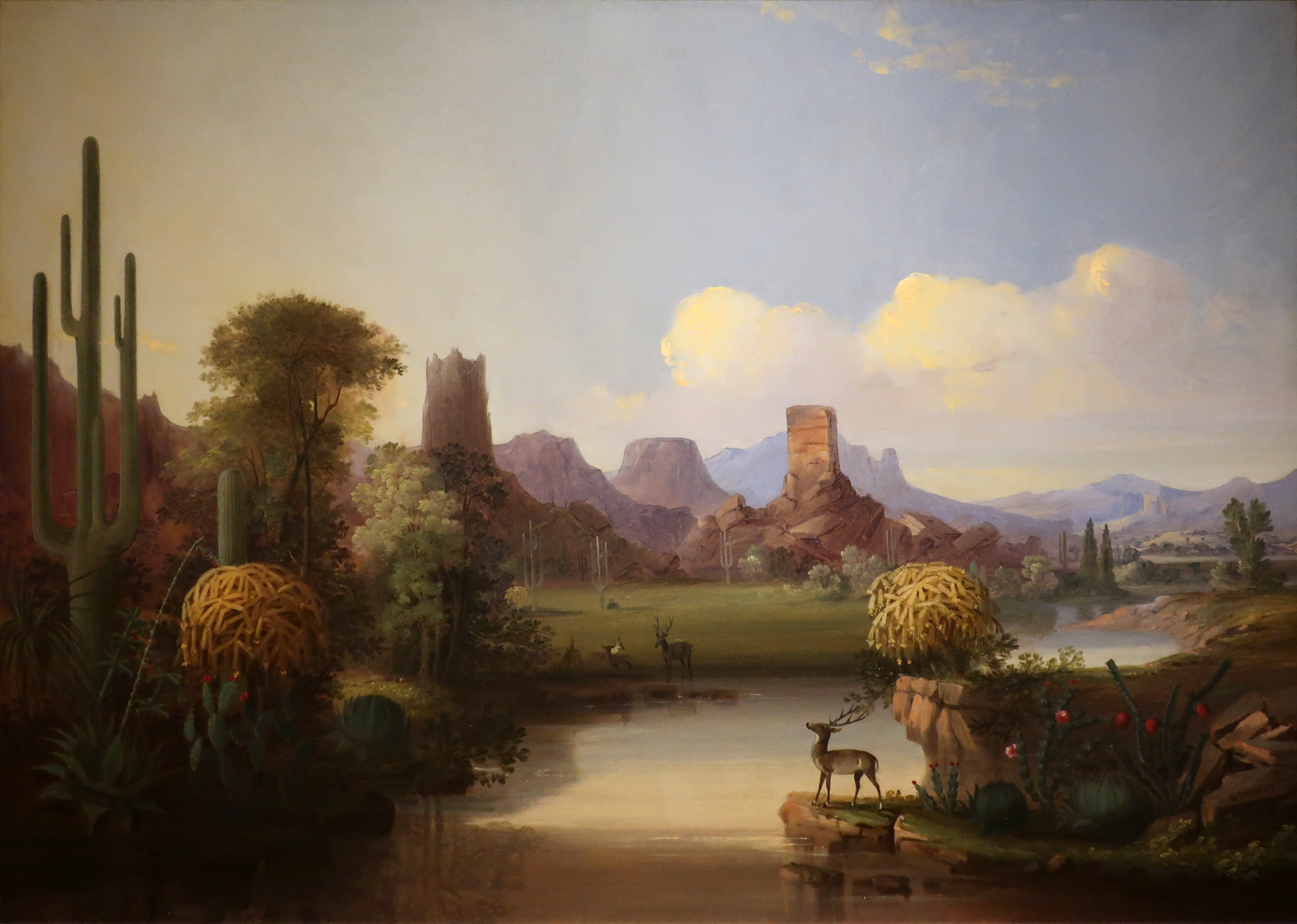
Chain of Spires Along the Gila River (1855)

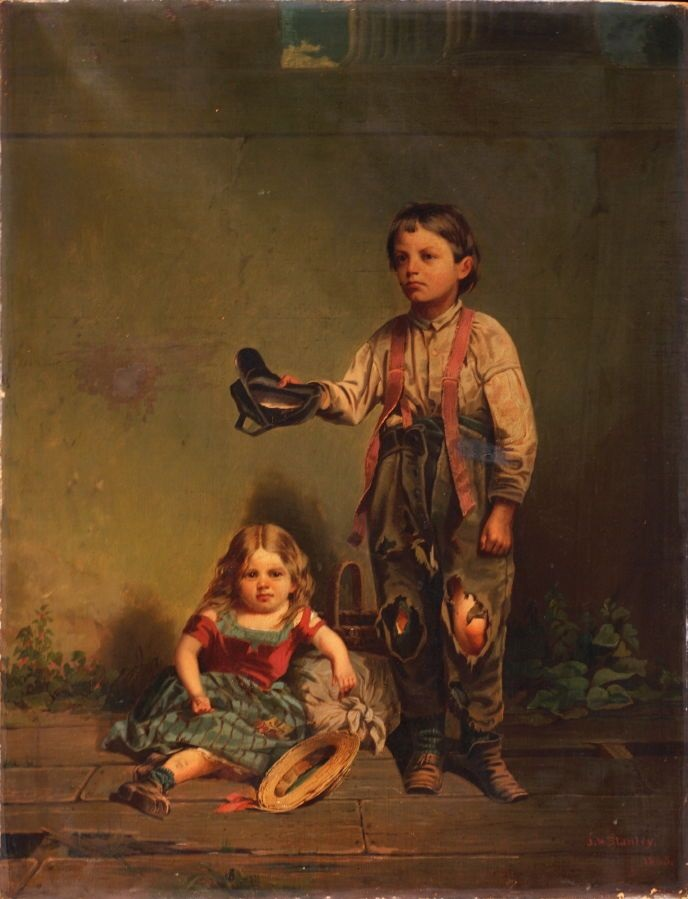
Beggar Boy (1865)

== See also ==
- Elbridge Ayer Burbank
- George Catlin
- Seth Eastman
- Paul Kane
- W. Langdon Kihn
- Charles Bird King
- Joseph Henry Sharp
