= Alice Acheson =

American painter (1895–1996)

- Born: Alice Stanley; August 12, 1895; Charlevoix, Michigan, U.S.
- Died: January 20, 1996 (aged 100); Washington, D.C., U.S.
- Resting place: Oak Hill Cemetery; Washington, D.C., U.S.
- Education: Wellesley College
- Known for: Painting, Printmaking
- Spouse: Dean Acheson (m. 1917; died 1971)
- Children: 3

Alice Acheson (née Stanley; August 12, 1895 – January 20, 1996) was an American painter and printmaker.

== Life ==
Born in Charlevoix, Michigan, the daughter of artist Jane C. Stanley and the granddaughter of John Mix Stanley; her father, Louis Stanley, was a railroad lawyer. She grew up in Detroit.

She majored in art at Wellesley College, where among her classmates was the sister of Dean Acheson, who introduced the couple; the two married in May 1917, the same month she graduated from college.

She continued her artistic studies both before and after moving to Washington, D.C., with her husband, taking lessons at the School of the Museum of Fine Arts, Boston, the Corcoran School of Art, and the school at the Phillips Collection. From 1919, she was active as an artist in Washington, eventually joining and exhibiting with the Society of Washington Artists, from which she received an honorable mention in 1940. She was also an active member of the Washington Water Color Club, the Artists Guild of Washington, and the National Association of Women Artists.

For the duration of World War II, she abandoned painting to pursue agriculture in support of the war effort, also teaching painting and drawing to wounded servicemen at the Forest Glen annex of Walter Reed Army Medical Center. She took it up again when her husband was appointed United States Secretary of State, but she refused to exhibit until he returned to private life, feeling she would be using his fame to further her own career. During the war, she worked with the Woman's Land Army of America and was the chair of its Women's Advisory Committee.

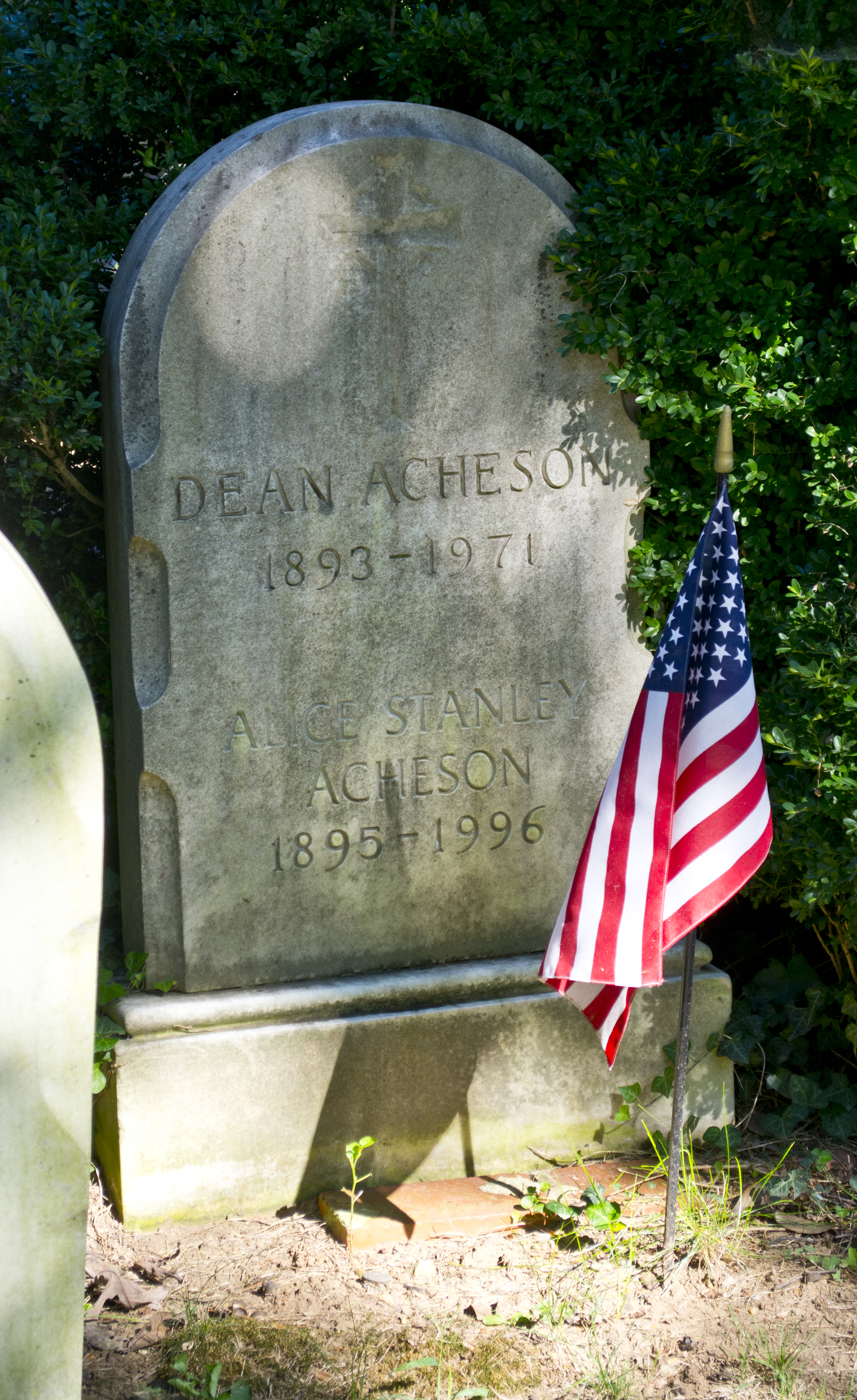
Grave of Alice Acheson in Oak Hill Cemetery.

Acheson was described as a fashionable woman who, though she took scant interest in foreign affairs, was devoted to her husband and would defend him against any ill feeling. The couple were the parents of three children, all of whom survived her, as did six grandchildren and six great-grandchildren.

She was noted for her passion for Scrabble and for her independent spirit, at 85 telling off a teenage mugger who attempted to rob her. Acheson died at her home in Washington, and was buried in Oak Hill Cemetery alongside her husband.

== Works ==
Acheson worked in pastels, watercolor, and oils during her career, progressing from a representational style to something approaching abstraction. Four of her works are in the collection of the Hirshhorn Museum and Sculpture Garden, part of the original bequest by Joseph Hirshhorn; they include a still-life in oil, dated before 1956; an undated landscape in oil; a 1975 watercolor view of Phnom Penh; and a 1970 collage titled The City. Two undated watercolors are owned by the Smithsonian American Art Museum. Other pieces are owned by the Phillips Collection, the National Museum of Women in the Arts, and the Harry S. Truman Presidential Library and Museum. Her work was formerly in the collection of the Corcoran Gallery of Art, and may be found as well at American University and in the Barnett-Aden Collection. Several of her linoleum cut prints were used to illustrate New Roads in Old Virginia by Agnes Rothberg in 1937. A vertical file pertaining to Acheson's work is at the library of the Phillips Collection; other papers may be found with her husband's private documents at the Yale University Library. She is also featured in some materials held among her husband's official papers at the Harry S. Truman Presidential Library and Museum. Paintings and further biographical details can be found on the website of Simonis & Buunk.
