= Gooderham =

Gooderham is a surname. Notable people with the surname include:

- Albert Gooderham (1861–1935), Canadian distiller and financier
- Bill Gooderham (1919–1979), Canadian sailor
- George Horace Gooderham (1868–1942), Canadian businessman and politician
- Hector Gooderham (1909–1977), Scottish Episcopalian priest
- Peter Gooderham (born 1954), British diplomat
- William Gooderham, Sr. (1790–1881), Canadian distiller, businessman, and banker

== See also ==
- Gooderham and Worts, Canadian distillery company
- Gooderham Building, prominent landmark in Toronto
- Gooderham, Ontario, a community in Highlands East, Ontario
  - Gooderham/Pencil Lake Water Aerodrome, aerodrome near Gooderham, Ontario
