= Bill Gooderham =

Canadian sailor

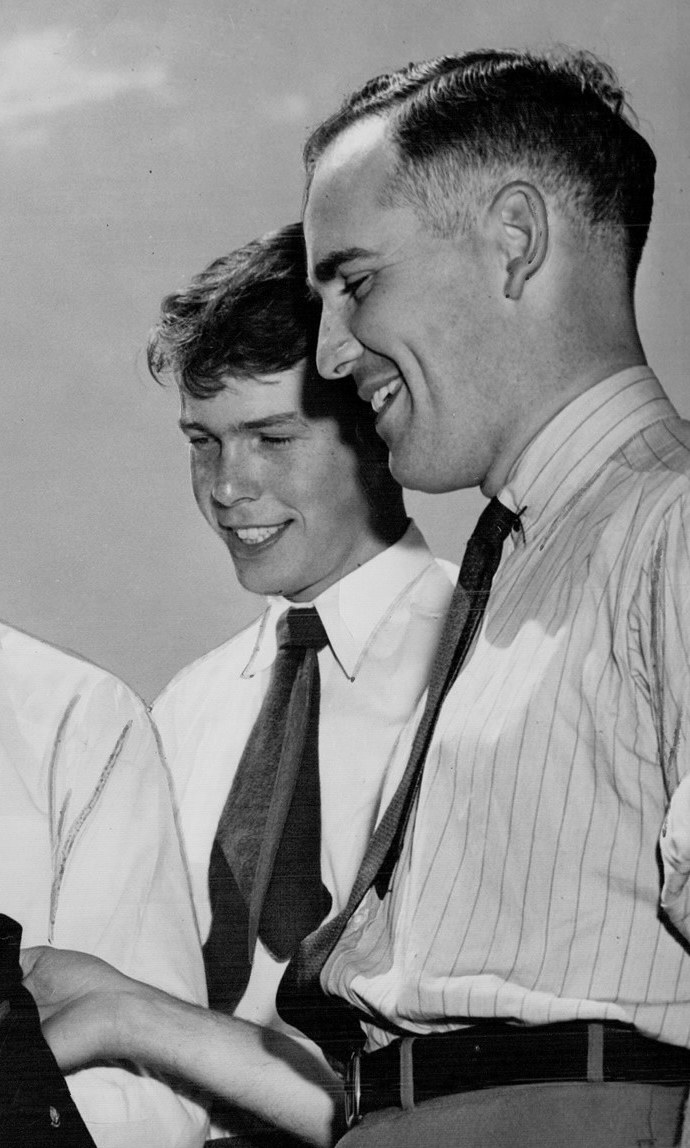
- Gooderham (right) in 1948

Personal information
- Born: 12 May 1919 Toronto, Ontario, Canada
- Died: 15 December 1979 (aged 60) Lambton Shores, Ontario, Canada

Sport
- Sport: Sailing
- Club: Royal Canadian Yacht Club

Norman William Gooderham (12 May 1919 – 15 December 1979) was a Canadian sailor. He competed at the 1948 Summer Olympics in the Star class and at the 1952 Summer Olympics in the 6 meter category and finished seventh-eights.

Gooderham trained at the Royal Canadian Yacht Club and later served as its Commodore. He came from a family of prominent businessmen and sailors that included George Horace Gooderham, Albert Gooderham and William Gooderham Sr. Besides his ancestors, his sisters Audrey and Ruth, his wife JoAnne, his son Bryan and grandchildren Yolande and Billy, all competed in sailing. In 1949, during their honeymoon, Gooderham and his wife placed fourth at an international regatta in Bermuda.
