= Young Centre for the Performing Arts =

Coordinates: 43°39′03″N 79°21′27″W

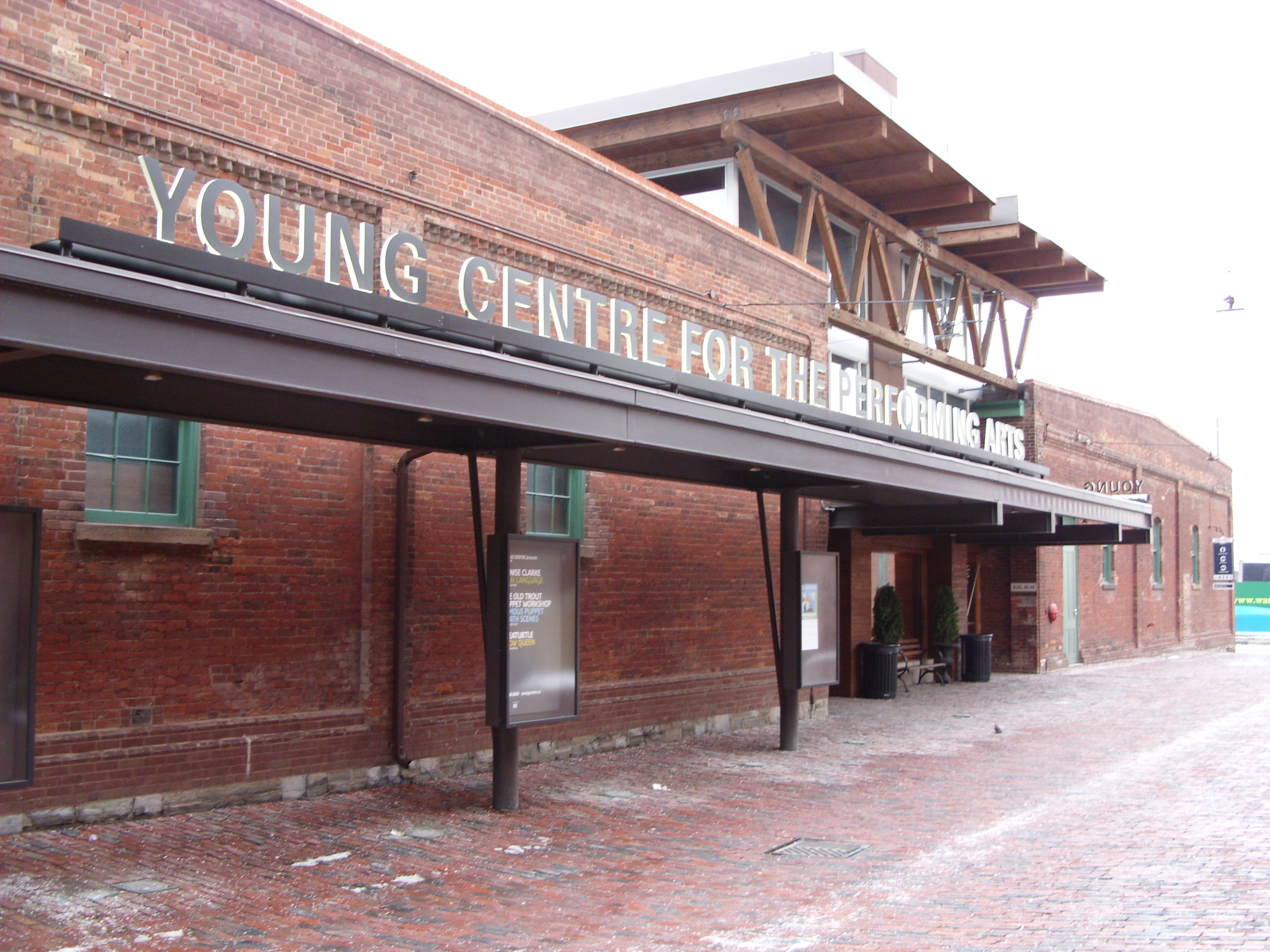
Young Centre for the Performing Arts

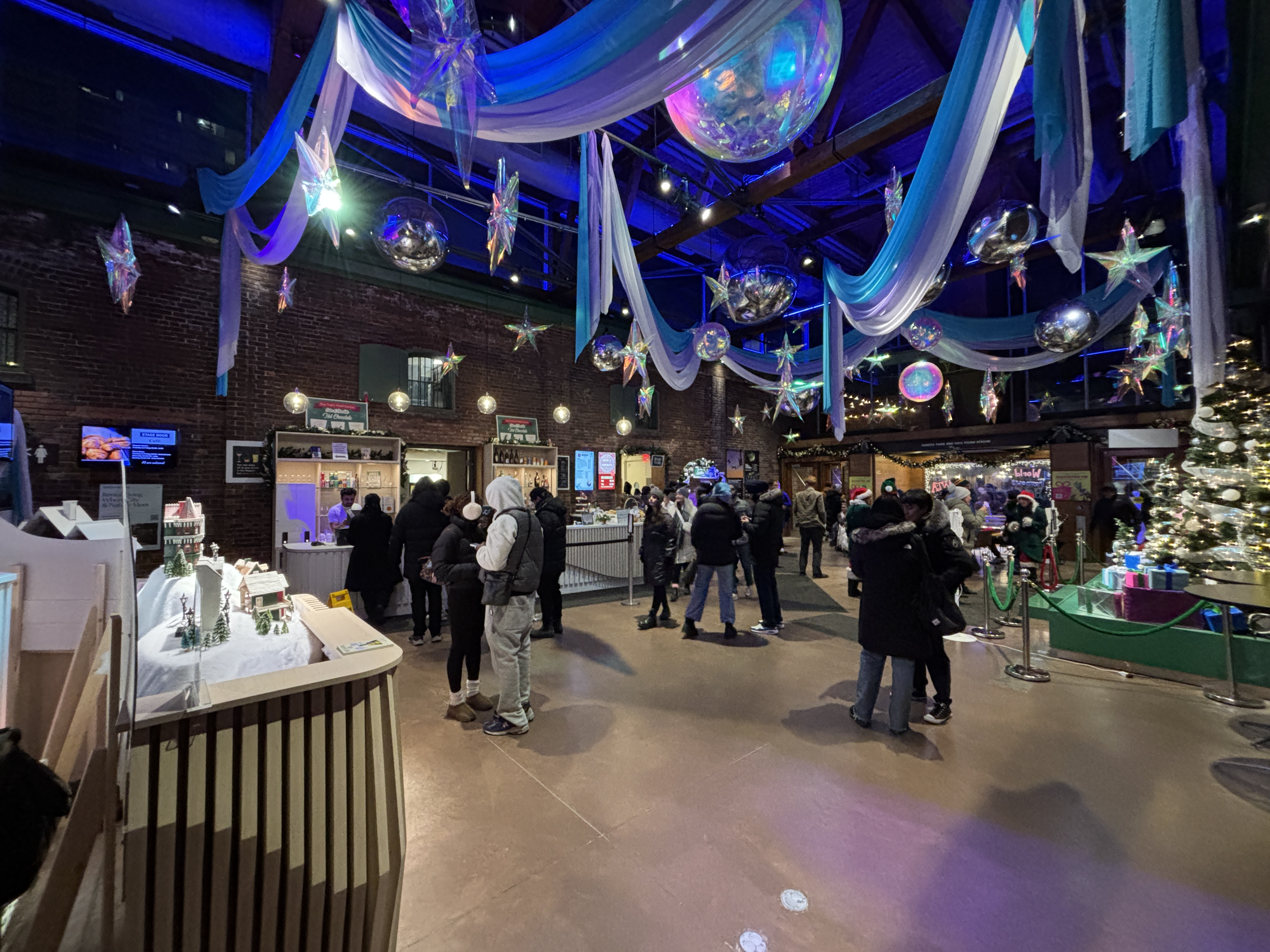
Lobby

The Young Centre for the Performing Arts is a theatre in the Distillery District in downtown Toronto, Canada. It is a brand-new theatre built into 19th-century-era Victorian industrial buildings. It is home to the Soulpepper Theatre Company and the theatre school at George Brown College.

== History ==
Gooderham and Worts was founded by James Worts, a British immigrant, in 1832. The company became one of the world's largest distilleries, and in 1859 it constructed the largest distillery in Canada, also one of the largest in North America. This distillery is what remains today of the 'Distillery District' at the bottom of Trinity Street in Toronto, Ontario. In the first year of the new distillery, G&W produced 849,700 U.S. gallons of proof spirits, a value equivalent to one quarter of the entire Canadian production at that time. What is now known as the Young Center For the Performing Arts was originally built as tank house 9 and tank house 10, part of the Gooderham and Worts Distillery. The buildings were constructed in 1888 following the 1885 passage of the Canadian law which required that all whisky must be aged for two years before being consumed. Prior to this law change, whisky was often consumed quickly after it was distilled; the law change meant that Gooderham and Worts needed to increase storage space for their product. Both structures were designed by David Roberts Jr., who designed many of the Distillery's buildings.

== Current use ==
Currently the two tank houses with their additions/renovations house a performance center which combines studio spaces with theatre spaces. The building is a partnership between the Soulpepper Theatre company and the George Brown Theatre School. The building houses four theaters and four studio spaces, all of which are shared by the two entities that make up the owners of the complex.

In December 2000 Paul Carder, then the Dean of Business and Creative Arts at George Brown College, approached Albert Schultz the Artistic Director of Soulpepper Theatre Company with the suggestion that a partnership be struck between Soulpepper and the George Brown Theatre School.

In November 2001, the Distillery Historic District Project was announced and the partnership of George Brown College (GBC) and Soulpepper immediately began negotiations with the Cityscape Development group to take possession of Tank Houses 9 and 10 creating what would become the Young Centre for the Performing Arts.

The vision of this partnership was to create a performing arts, education and community outreach facility that would be home to George Brown Theatre School's celebrated three-year professional actor training program; Soulpepper Theatre Company with its three-tiered mandate of performance, artist training and youth outreach; and Toronto's independent arts community. This facility, in which the performance and education of all performing disciplines would be undertaken, would be unique in the world.

In 2002, the architectural firm of KPMB Architects was hired to design the centre with Thomas Payne as the principal architect, Chris Couse as senior associate and Mark Jaffar as project architect. The design created four flexible, dedicated, indoor performance venues, an outdoor concert venue and artist garden, four studios, two classrooms, a wardrobe production facility, a student lounge, administration for GBC and Soulpepper. At the centre of the building is a soaring public space, which includes a café/bar, a bookstore and a reference library. The total cost of the facility is $14 million and GBC and Soulpepper Theatre Company have equally shared the cost. The shared dream became a reality in 2003, when David Young through the Michael Young Family Foundation contributed a lead gift of $3 million to what is now known as the Young Centre for the Performing Arts.

Shortly thereafter, the Government of Ontario through the Ministry of Culture made a $2 million contribution and the Government of Canada through the Department of Heritage Cultural Spaces Program contributed $600,000.

George Brown College and Soulpepper Theatre undertook separate capital campaigns to fund their respective shares in the project.

In June 2004, Anne Sado, President of George Brown College, and Albert Schultz, Soulpepper's Artistic Director, presided over a groundbreaking ceremony for the Young Centre for the Performing Arts. On January 15, 2006 the Young Centre for the Performing Arts officially opened to the public.
