= William Henry Beatty =

Canadian businessman and lawyer (1833-1912)

- Born: December 10, 1833
- Died: November 20, 1912 (aged 78)
- Education: Upper Canada College
- Occupations: lawyer and businessman

William Henry Beatty (December 10, 1833 – November 20, 1912), was a Canadian lawyer and businessman.

William Henry Beatty was the eldest of three sons and five daughters of James Beatty, an Irish-born Toronto merchant. James had operated the British Woollen and Cotton Warehouse on the south side of King Street and had served in the militia, rising to the rank of colonel. In 1832, he had married Ann, the daughter of James McKowen of Dublin. He was educated at Upper Canada College from 1842 to 1845. Some years later Beatty decided to study law. He articled with John Leys and attended lectures at Osgoode Hall. He was admitted to the Bar February 5, 1863, and entered into partnership with Edward Marion Chadwick who was from an important Guelph family also of Irish origin and his future brother-in-law. On Tuesday June 28, 1864, Chadwick married Beatty's sister, Ellen at St. James Cathedral. Regrettably Ellen, the woman who had brought the two partners together, died suddenly in February of the following year, after only a few hours of illness. Chadwick's short-lived marriage to Ellen may have helped cement the partnership, but the success of the firm was intimately connected with Beatty's marriage. In April 1865, Beatty remarried Charlotte Louisa Worts at Little Trinity Anglican Church. She was the eldest daughter of James Gooderham Worts, was one of the two partners in the Gooderham & Worts distillery and milling business and an important figure in a number of other businesses.

Beatty and Chadwick remained partners for almost 50 years. Of the two, it was Beatty who made the firm Canada's largest law firm, numbering 16 lawyers in 1901. As a lawyer, Beatty helped his clients establish and manage their businesses. He remained the managing partner of the firm until 1906, personally overseeing the many details of its operation.

Beatty employed future business magnate David Fasken and mentored him.

Beatty was also a businessman. By 1890 he had become the principal legal and business adviser to the Gooderham and Worts business empire and was one of the most prominent members of the developing Canadian financial community. At various times, he served as a director of Gooderham & Worts, Limited. (the company he incorporated on Worts' death to continue the partnership business), Vice-President of London and Ontario Investment Company and Canada's first trust company, the Toronto General Trusts Company, and was President of the Bank of Toronto, the Toronto Silver Plate Company, the Canada Permanent Mortgage Corporation and the Confederation Life Association, an insurance company that he helped found in 1871 and manage for over forty years .

He was active in the Toronto Board of Trade, co-authoring with Wallace Nesbitt a set of arbitration rules for the board. He also represented the Board in 1896 at the Congress of the Chambers of Commerce of the British Empire in London, England.

Although, in his words he did not take "any active interest in politics", he was a "true blue Conservative" and when he thought it necessary, he used his political connections and his personal friendship with Sir John A. Macdonald and Sir Charles Tupper to assist his clients.
