= Protestant Federation of Patriotic Women =

Canadian organization

- Abbreviation: Protestant Women's Federation
- Established: March 1922
- Founded at: Toronto, Canada
- Purpose: To provide an organization of women to take prompt and united action whenever the interests of Canada and the Empire require it; to promote the study of the fundamental principles of the christian faith and Protestantism in irs relation to the development and maintenance of civil and religious liberty; to encourage the exercise of the franchise; and to advocate the adoption of policies and usages beneficial to the interests of Canada as a whole, with power to take over the property, assets and liabilities of the existing voluntary association known as "The Protestant Women's Federation".
- Professional title: Protestant Federation of Patriotic Women of Canada
- Region served: Canada
- Official language: English
- President: Mary Reford Gooderham

The Protestant Federation of Patriotic Women (commonly known as the Protestant Women's Federation; legal name after incorporation Protestant Federation of Patriotic Women of Canada) was established in March 1922, in Toronto, Canada. It was described as "An association of women of the Protestant communions for the purpose of maintaining our British institutions which guarantee civil and religious liberty to all citizens".

== Organization ==
The federation comprised local branches, General Council, and an executive board.

In January 1923, the organization published a notification of its application to the Parliament of Canada for an Act to incorporate "The Protestant Federation of Patriotic Women of Canada" (Protestant Women's Federation) for the following purposes: To provide an organization of women to take prompt and united action whenever the interests of Canada and the Empire require it; to promote the study of the fundamental principles of the christian faith and Protestantism in irs relation to the development and maintenance of civil and religious liberty; to encourage the exercise of the franchise; and to advocate the adoption of policies and usages beneficial to the interests of Canada as a whole, with power to take over the property, assets and liabilities of the existing voluntary association known as "The Protestant Women's Federation". It was assented to by an Act of Parliament on June 13, 1923.

== History ==
The organization was initially headed by Mary Reford Gooderham. The first meeting was convened on April 25, 1922. In the same month, a second branch was established in Ottawa. By 1926, a third branch, at St. Catharines, had been formed.

The federation worked along philanthropic, missionary and educational lines, arranging for lectures and addresses on subjects consonant with its general aims, and circulating Protestant pamphlets. The St. Catharines Branch had its Home for Aged Protestant Women; and the Toronto Branch, which received at each meeting an average of twelve new members, gave assistance to the Ukrainian newspaper, Faith and Knowledge. In Toronto, a special collection was made at each meeting for sending the Bible, or portions of the Bible, to foreign settlements in Western Canada, to Ukraine, Russia and Czechoslovakia.

Its work expanded to include the Eskimos, medical missions in Ireland, the Veterans' Children, the Committee on Faith and Order in Switzerland, and the Ukrainian Autocephalous Greek Orthodox Church in North America.

In 1964, it campaigned against making English and French both official languages in Canada.

== Objectives ==
The objects of the federation were to:

1. Provide an organization of women who will be prepared to take prompt and united action whenever the Interests of Canada and the Empire appear to demand it.
2. Promote the study of the fundamental principles of the Protestant faith and their relation to the development and maintenance of religious liberty.
3. Provide a common meeting ground for all women of the Protestant faith.
4. Encourage all Protestant women to exercise the franchise in the best interests of Canada.
5. Foster a sound and intelligent tolerance of one another's conscientious religious convictions.
6. Promote, within Canada, the study of questions affecting Canada and the Empire.
7. Arrange for lectures and addresses by competent persons on subjects of Canadian and Imperial importance, and for the furtherance of the objects referred to in paragraph 2, and to disseminate information with kindred organizations for these purposes.
8. Urge that the National Anthem be taught and sung in schools in Canada, and be used at all public services and public meetings.
9. Urge that every public school be required to keep the Union Jack flying during the period in which the children are in attendance at such school, and that members of the federation display the Union Jack on all holidays and during events of national importance.
10. Advocate a selected immigration policy, for the purpose of keeping out undesirable aliens, whose presence proved a menace to the safety and well-being of Canada.
11. Promote the use of the English language in the public schools of Canada
12. Advocate that public moneys be spent on public institutions only.
