= Stone Distillery =

Industrial building in Ontario, Canada

Coordinates: 43.6498°N 79.3600°E

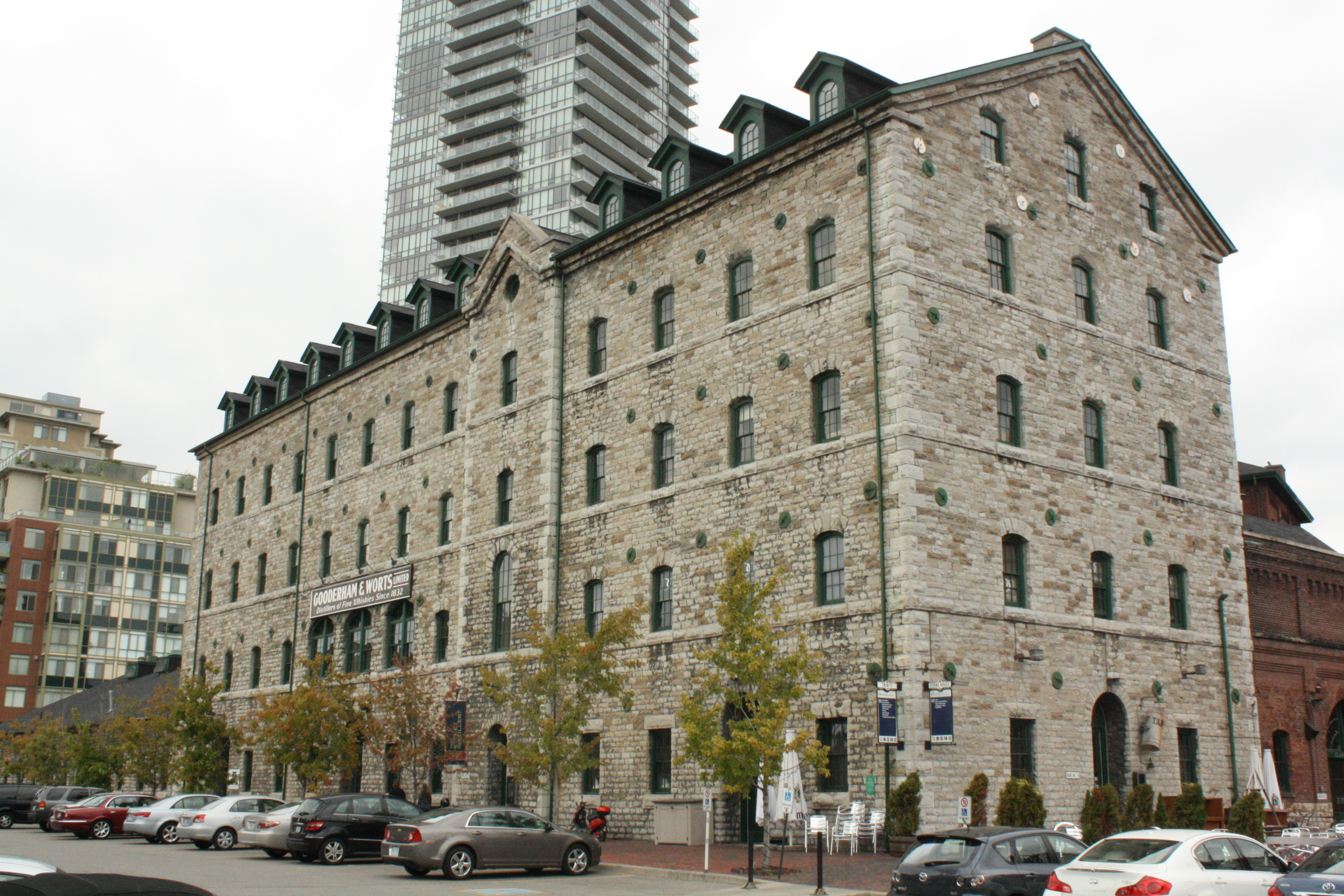
The Stone Distillery, View from south-east

The Stone Distillery is an 1859 heritage industrial building in Toronto, Ontario, Canada. It is the oldest and largest building in the Distillery District complex of Gooderham & Worts Distillery buildings.

== Description ==
Designed by David Roberts, Sr. the building was constructed between 1858 and 1861 using limestone shipped from nearby Kingston, Ontario and double-timber beams for a total of $150,000, the equivalent of $3,800,000 in 2015. The building was constructed to house a grist mill, power house, and mashing and distilling functions in the five-storey main building, and fermenting in the one-storey western extension.

The Stone Distillery has a dominating presence in the Distillery District, owing largely to its massive size and materials. The 300 by 80-foot (24 m) building is an outstanding representation of Victorian industrial architecture, while also echoing ancient Florentine architecture. Each storey in the main building is separated by a course of stone, and the larger first floor and square windows seat it firmly to the ground. The simple facade is punctuated by a rhythmic pattern of windows separated by circular iron tie plates. The entire building is also tied together by a simple colour scheme of warm grey limestone with dark green accents on the windows, doors, and other ornamentation.

== History ==
In 1869, an explosion in the fermenting cellar caused a massive fire to engulf the building, destroying the wooden interior, but leaving the stone and machinery largely undamaged. The building was reconstructed and reopened in May 1870.

During World War I and World War II, the distillery was used to produce explosive agents for the war effort, but returned to distilling in 1945 and remained productive until 1990. For the next ten years the distillery no longer produced alcohol, but instead served as the backdrop for hundreds of movies, such as Chicago and X-Men, in part helping to earn Toronto the name "Hollywood North".

In 2001 a major revitalization project began in the Distillery District, and in 2003 it was opened as a pedestrian-only arts and cultural centre. Today the building is home to restaurants, galleries, offices, and other services.

== See also ==
- List of oldest buildings and structures in Toronto
