= Distillery District =

The Distillery District
- Neighbourhood
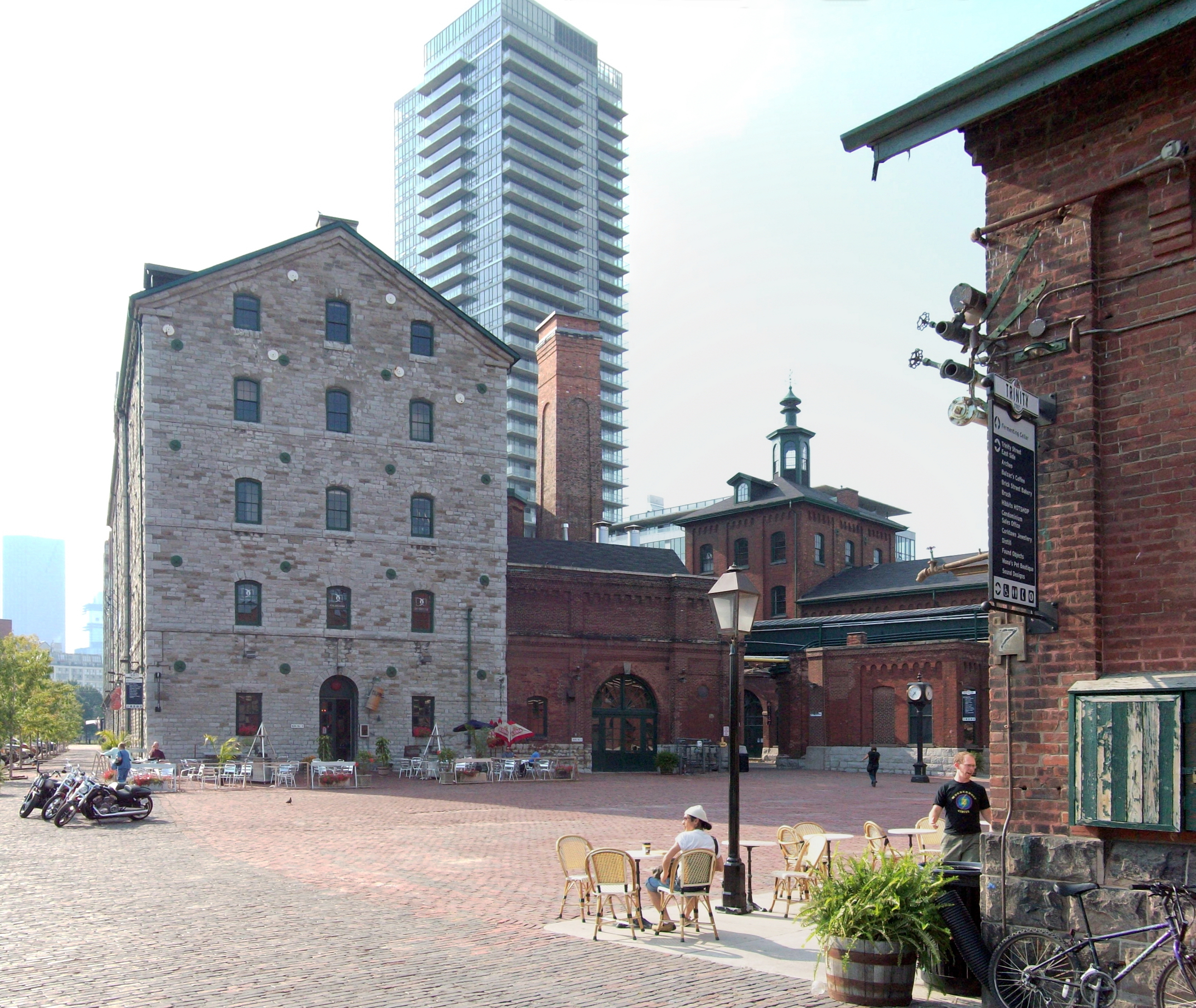
- The Distillery District street level

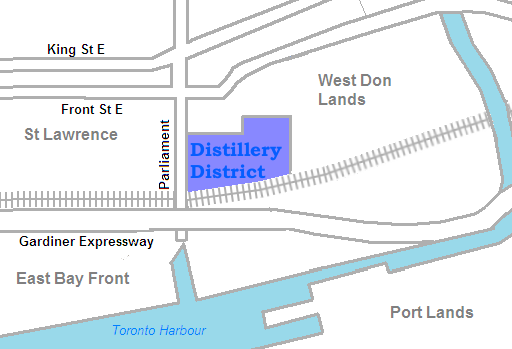
- Country: Canada
- Province: Ontario
- City: Toronto
- Time zone: UTC−5 (Eastern)
  - Summer (DST): UTC−4 (EDT)

National Historic Site of Canada
- Official name: Gooderham and Worts Distillery National Historic Site of Canada
- Designated: 11 November 1988

Ontario Heritage Act
- Designated: 1976

The Distillery District is a commercial and residential district in Toronto, Ontario, Canada, located in the lower east side of downtown. It contains numerous cafés, restaurants, and shops housed within heritage buildings of the former Gooderham and Worts Distillery. The 13 acres (5.3 ha) district comprises more than forty heritage buildings and ten streets, and is the largest collection of Victorian-era industrial architecture in North America.

The district was designated a National Historic Site of Canada in 1988.

== History ==
The Gooderham and Worts Distillery was founded in 1832. Once providing over 2 million US gallons (7,600,000 L) of whisky, mostly for export on the world market, the company was bought out in later years by rival Hiram Walker Co., another large Canadian distiller. Its location on the side of the Canadian National Railway mainline and its proximity to the mouth of the original route of the Don River outlet into Lake Ontario created a hard edge which separated the district from neighbouring communities. These did, however, allow for a facilitated transport connection to the rest of Canada and the world and acted as Toronto's domination as an industrial centre or transshipping hub.

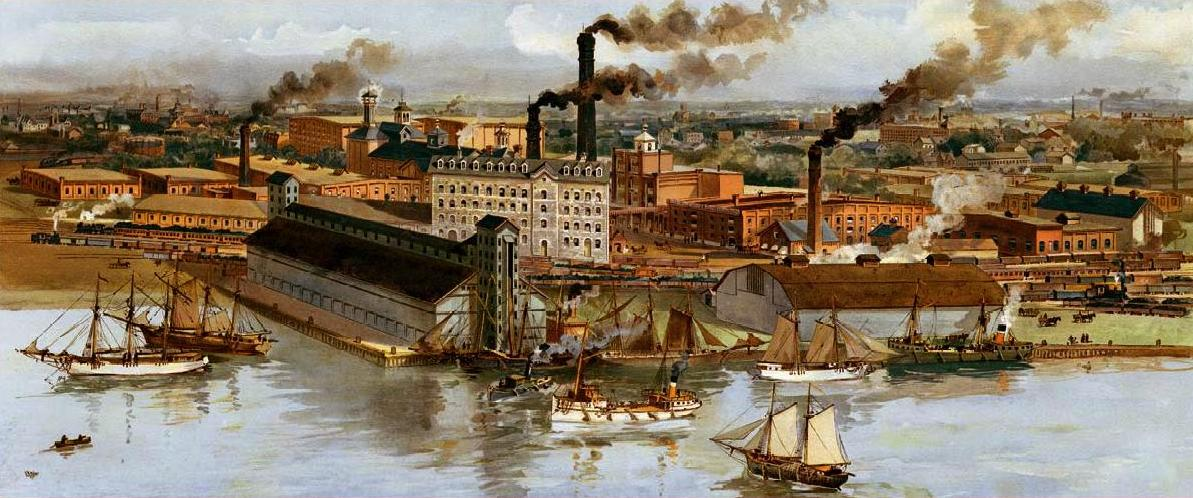
The Distillery District was home to the Gooderham and Worts distillery in the 1860s.

With the deindustrialization of the surrounding area in the late 20th century, and the winding-down of the distillery operations, the district was left increasingly derelict. Surrounding industrial and commercial buildings and structures were often demolished, leaving the former distillery surrounded primarily by empty lots. Nonetheless, the closing of the remaining distillery operations in 1990 created redevelopment and investment opportunities for a district that contained the largest and best preserved collection of Victorian-era industrial architecture in North America. The Distillery District was designated as a National Historic Site, and has been protected under the Ontario Heritage Act since 1976. It was listed by National Geographic magazine as a "top pick" in Canada for travellers.

The economic recession of the early 1990s, however, and the resulting crash in residential condominium prices and office lease rates in downtown Toronto, delayed efforts to revitalize the district. Nonetheless, two residential condominium buildings were constructed on the periphery of the district during the late 1990s.

While the site awaited redevelopment and reinvestment, the district's ambiance began to attract numerous film shoots. Since 1990, the site has served as a location for over 800 film and television productions.

=== 21st century ===
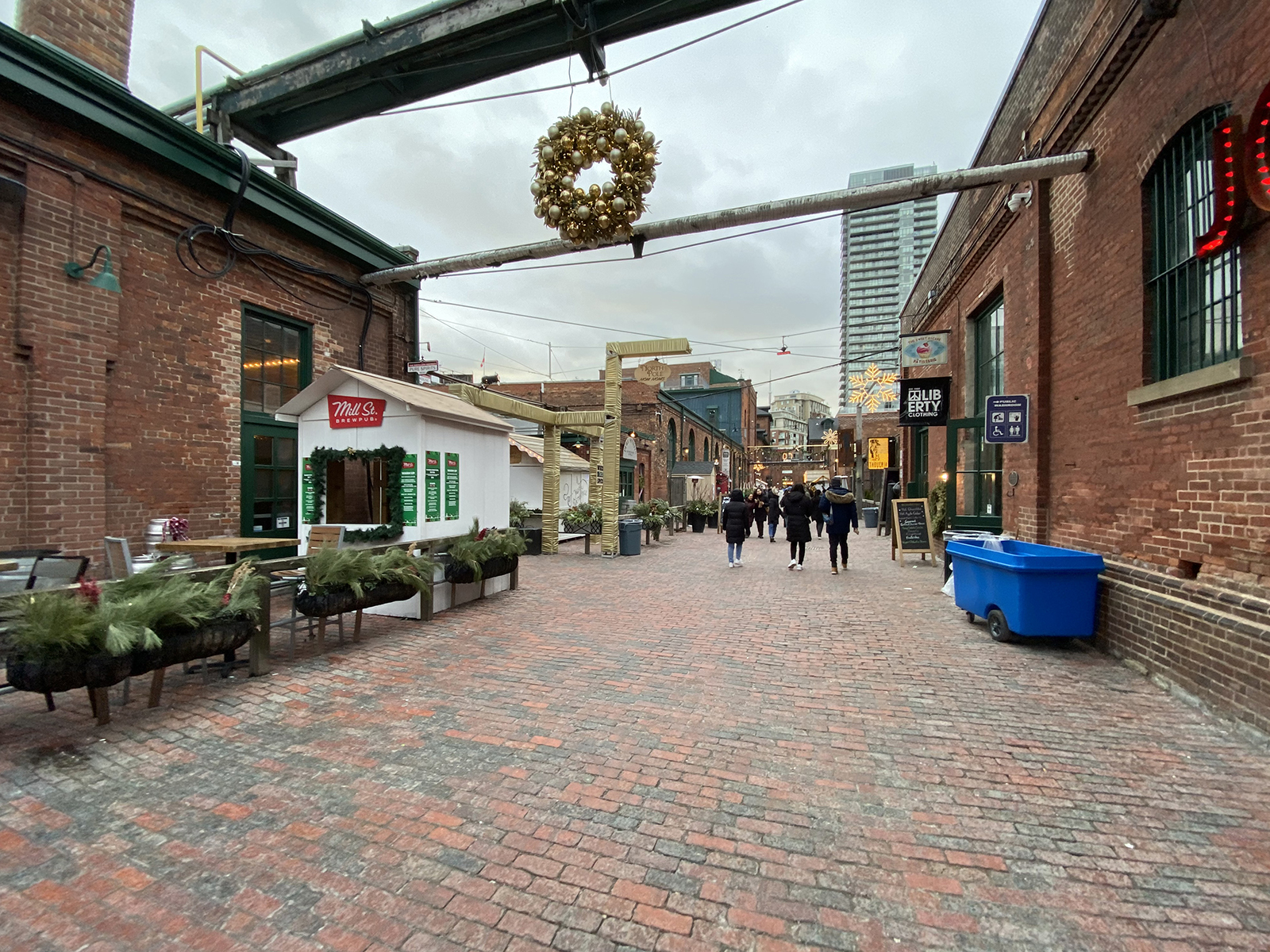
In 2001, the neighbourhood was made into a pedestrian-oriented area.

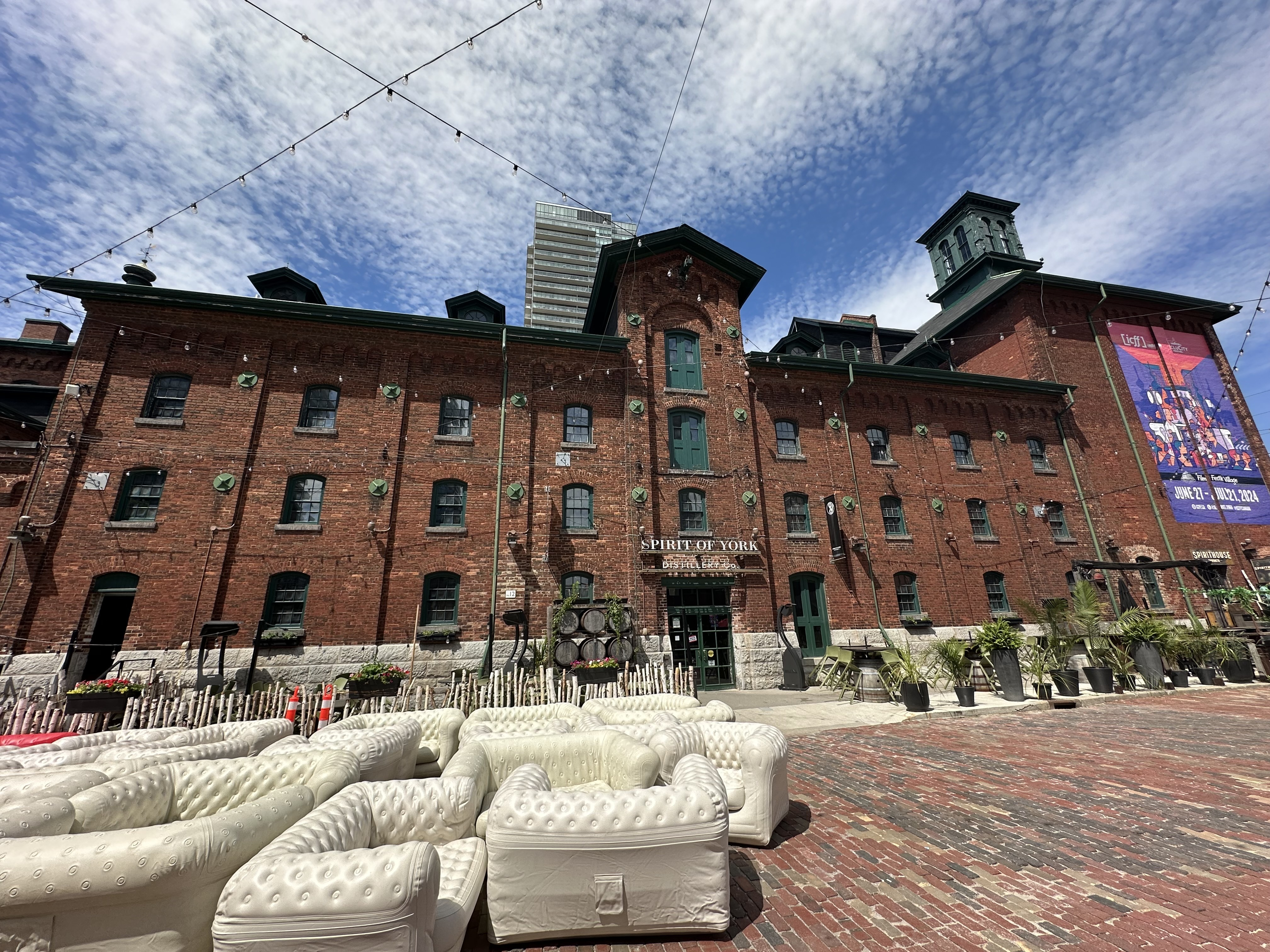
Spirit of York Distillery Co. building in July 2024

In 2001, the site was purchased by Cityscape Holdings Inc., who transformed the district into a pedestrian-orientated area. Work was completed and the district reopened to the public on May 22, 2003. The new owners refused to lease any of the retail and restaurant space to chains or franchises, and accordingly, the majority of the buildings are occupied with boutiques, art galleries, restaurants, jewellery stores, cafés, and coffeehouses, including a well-known microbrewery, the Mill Street Brewery. The upper floors of a number of buildings have been leased to artists as studio spaces and to office tenants with a "creative focus". A new theatre, the Young Centre for the Performing Arts, has opened on the site and serves as the home of the Soulpepper Theatre Company and the George Brown Theatre School. There are plans to develop residential condominiums, offices, and more retail space on the vacant lands that surround the district.

New condominium developments will be located at the south-east corner of the neighbourhood, bordering on Cherry Street and Tank House Lane.

The Pan American Games' Athletes' Village was built in the area in 2015, in conjunction with an extension to the streetcar network constructed along Cherry Street. After the games, the athletes village was converted to townhouses, condos, affordable housing, and retail space.

=== Toronto Christmas Market ===
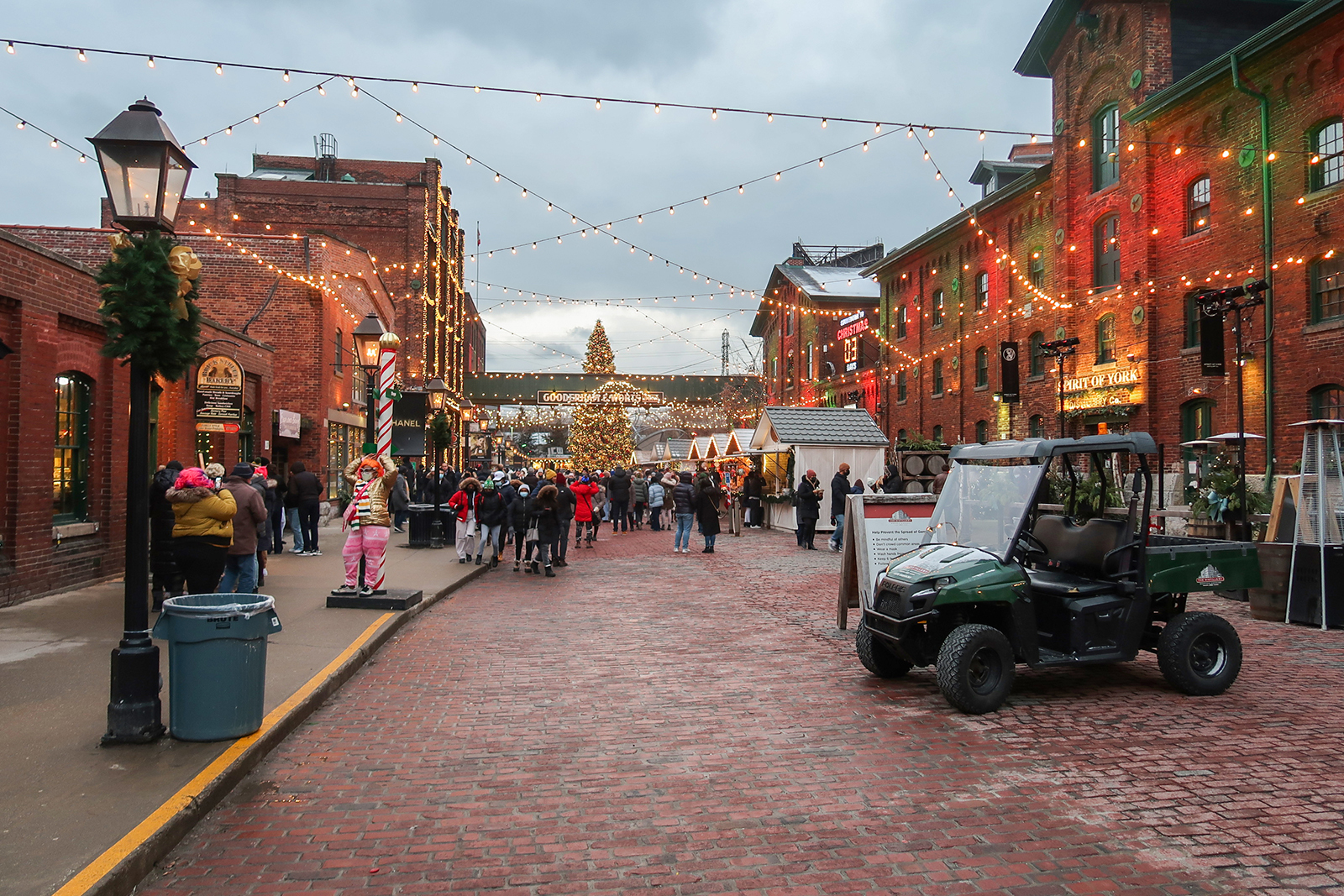
Christmas Market in 2021

The Toronto Christmas Market has been an annual outdoor tradition run within the Distillery District since 2010. Beth Edney has been the designer since this event began. She also does designs around the Distillery District throughout the year. The market includes "Santa's house", an Indigo pop-up shop, pet photos with Santa, a Ferris wheel and themed entertainment each day. There are food vendors and dining locations that are popular tourist attractions.

The 2020 edition of the event was cancelled due to the COVID-19 pandemic in Toronto. The event returned for 2021, under the new name "The Distillery Winter Village".

== Urban design ==
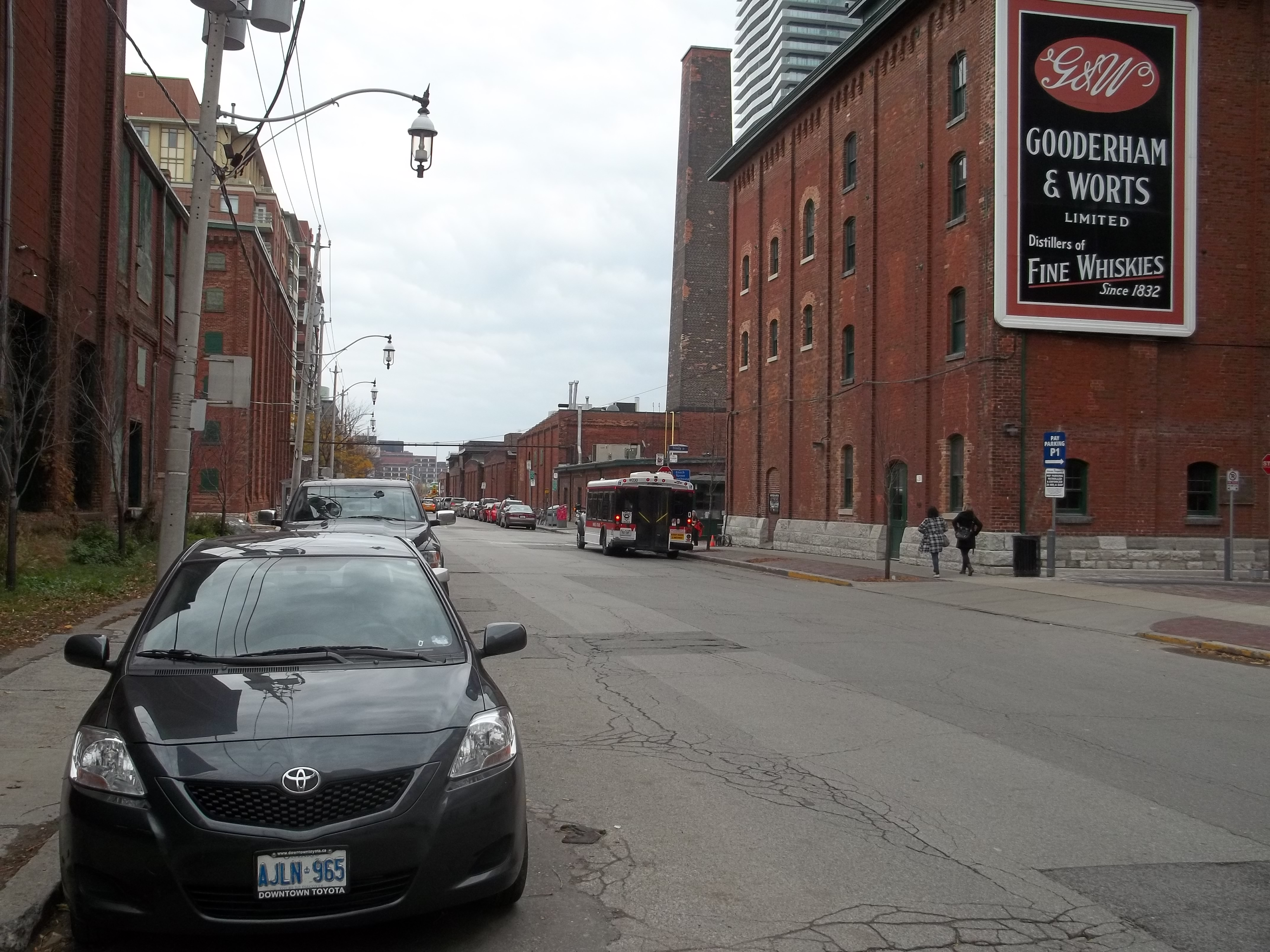
Motor vehicle traffic is restricted to the outer areas of the Distillery District, with most of the neighbourhood designated as a pedestrian zone.

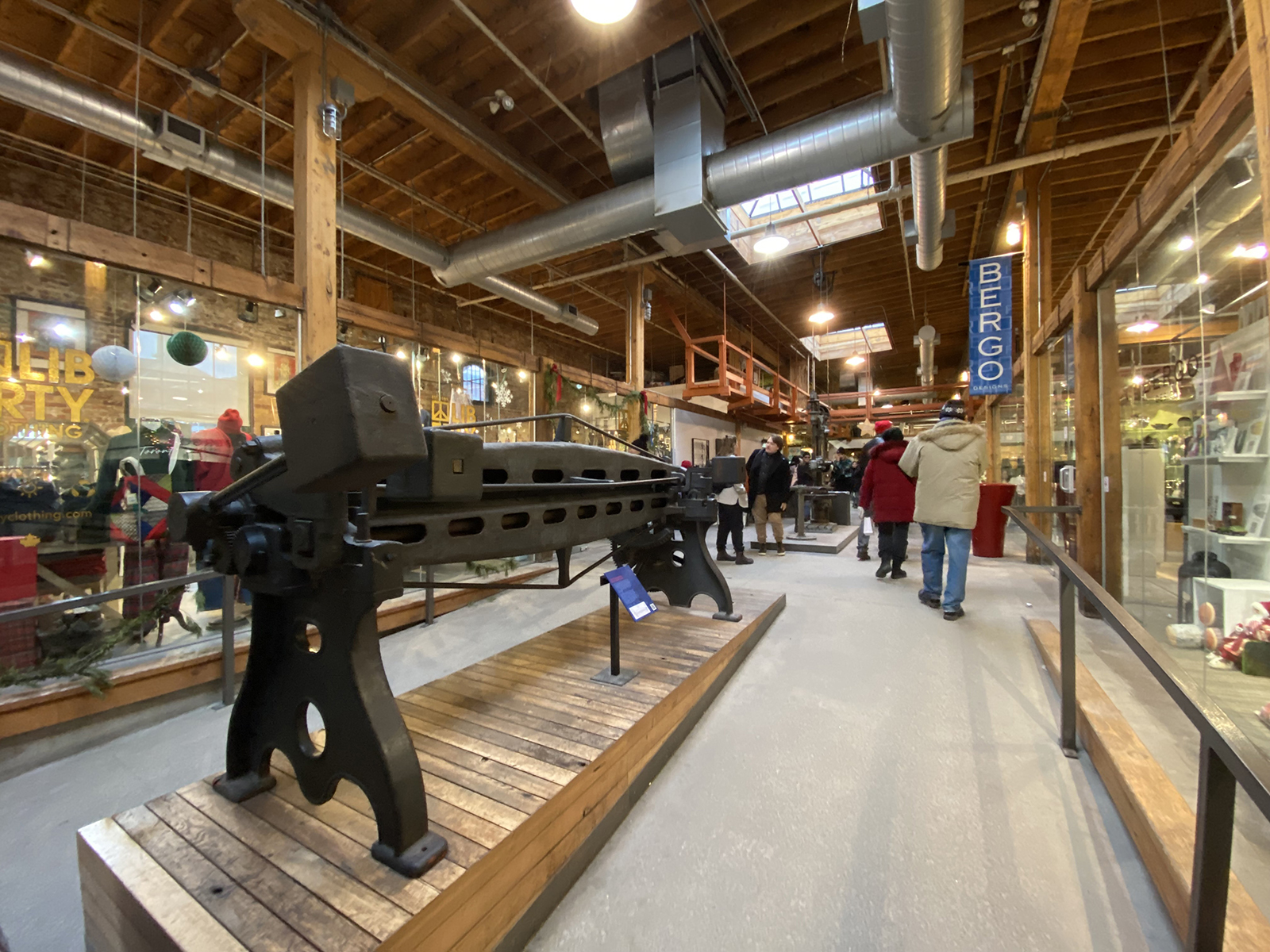
28 Tank House Lane display some items in the past

The Distillery District's traditional brick-paved streets and lanes are restricted to pedestrians and cyclists, with general motor vehicle traffic restricted to streets and parking areas outside of the district's historic centre. Several large sculptures installed along the lanes enliven its streetscapes, three being on Distillery Lane and the final one at the parking area at the end of Trinity Street. Another primary landmark is the chimney stack atop the Boiler House complex. There are informal public spaces on the pedestrianized streets with chairs and tables for general use, as well as formal patios for some of its coffee houses and restaurants.

Trinity Street is the widest street in the district and often functions as a public square for events such as market days. The main thoroughfares within the district are Distillery Lane from Parliament Street running southeast to Trinity Street, Trinity Street from Mill Street at its north end to the motor vehicle parking area at its south end, and Tank House Lane from Trinity Street east to Cherry Street. The four borders of the Distillery District are Parliament Street to the west, Mill Street to the north, Cherry Street to the east, and the parking area to the south with the condominiums along Distillery Lane forming hard edges to pedestrians.

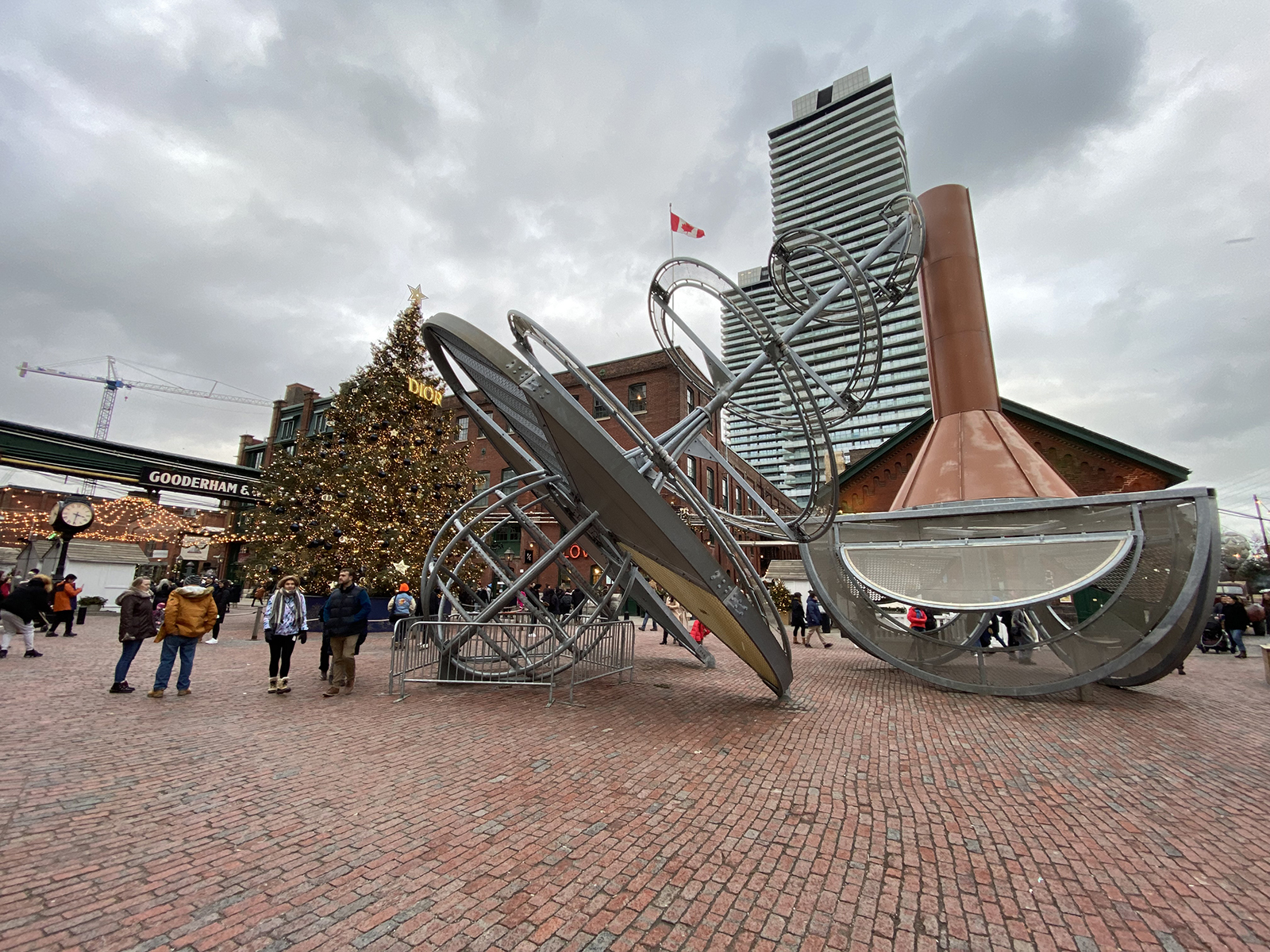
Trinity Street is the Distillery District's widest street and serves as a public square for the community.

Public transit access to the district is provided by the Toronto Transit Commission's 121 Fort York-Esplanade bus route, 504 King streetcar line (A branch only), and seasonally by its 202 Cherry Beach bus route.

The surrounding lands are animated with a mix of uses: residential areas at Parliament and Distillery and at the eastern end of Mill Street up to Cherry, restaurants along Trinity Street, Tank House Lane, Brewery Lane, and Case Goods Lane, and education uses at the eastern end of Tank House Lane.

=== Government policy ===
Toronto's Official Plan designates the Distillery District as a mixed-use land parcel, which is an area that includes a combination of land uses such as commercial, residential, entertainment facilities and art galleries. In order to provide additional details regarding the breakdown of the types of mixed uses in the area, the King-Parliament Secondary Plan is used to determine the locations of the commercial, residential, and other land uses.

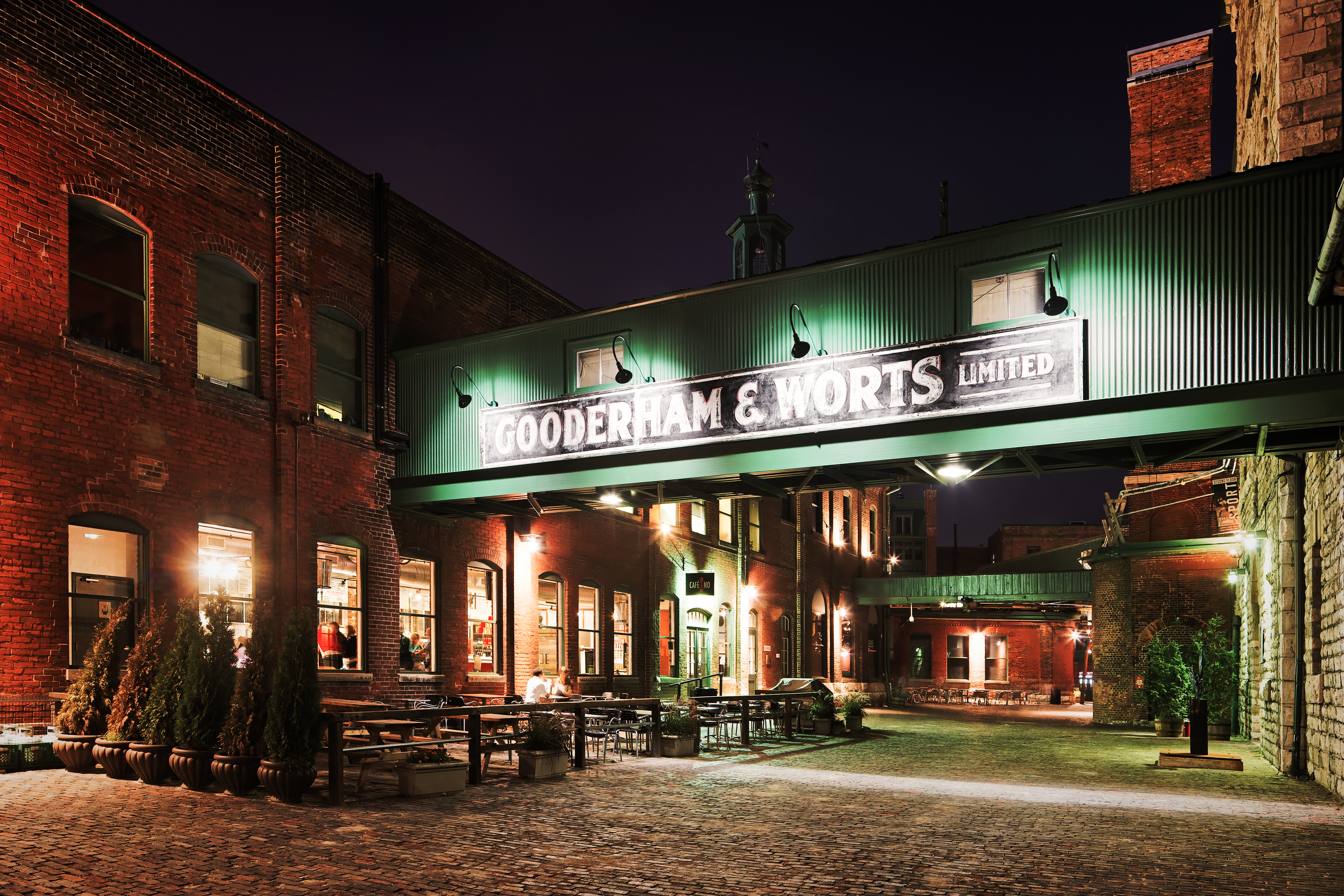
The Distillery District is a historic district that sees land use for residential, commercial, and entertainment purposes.

In addition, the plan also outlines design guidelines and places emphasis on enhancing the existing historical buildings. The plan divides the 13-acre area into three different mixed-use designations. This includes the incorporation of a bike lane and private roadway where the current southern park lot is located. The remaining existing structures within the District all comply with the outlined land uses within the Secondary Plan.

In addition, the Ontario Heritage Act, 1990 is a governing document for the historical buildings that have been redeveloped on the site. Any amendments to this act must be proposed to the Conservation Review Board for approval. In particular, the Secondary Plan reinforces these notions by stating that any additions to existing buildings within mixed-use areas 2 and 3 "may be permitted only if it has been demonstrated that they respect the three-dimensional integrity of the heritage building and the quality and the character of both the historic building being added to and its relationship to adjacent historical buildings within the area". The Secondary Plan is important for guiding how development occurs within the area. It provides the course of action for what the future image of the Distillery should look like and ensures that development at a small scale (such as the 13-acre area of the Distillery) is compliant with plans outlined in the city's master plan (official plan) and is reflective of the province's Planning Act (1990), which sets out the ground rules for land use planning.

Various buildings on the site are protected under part IV of the Ontario Heritage Act since 1976. The property at 70 Mill Street is protected under a heritage easement since April 3, 1996.

== Buildings ==
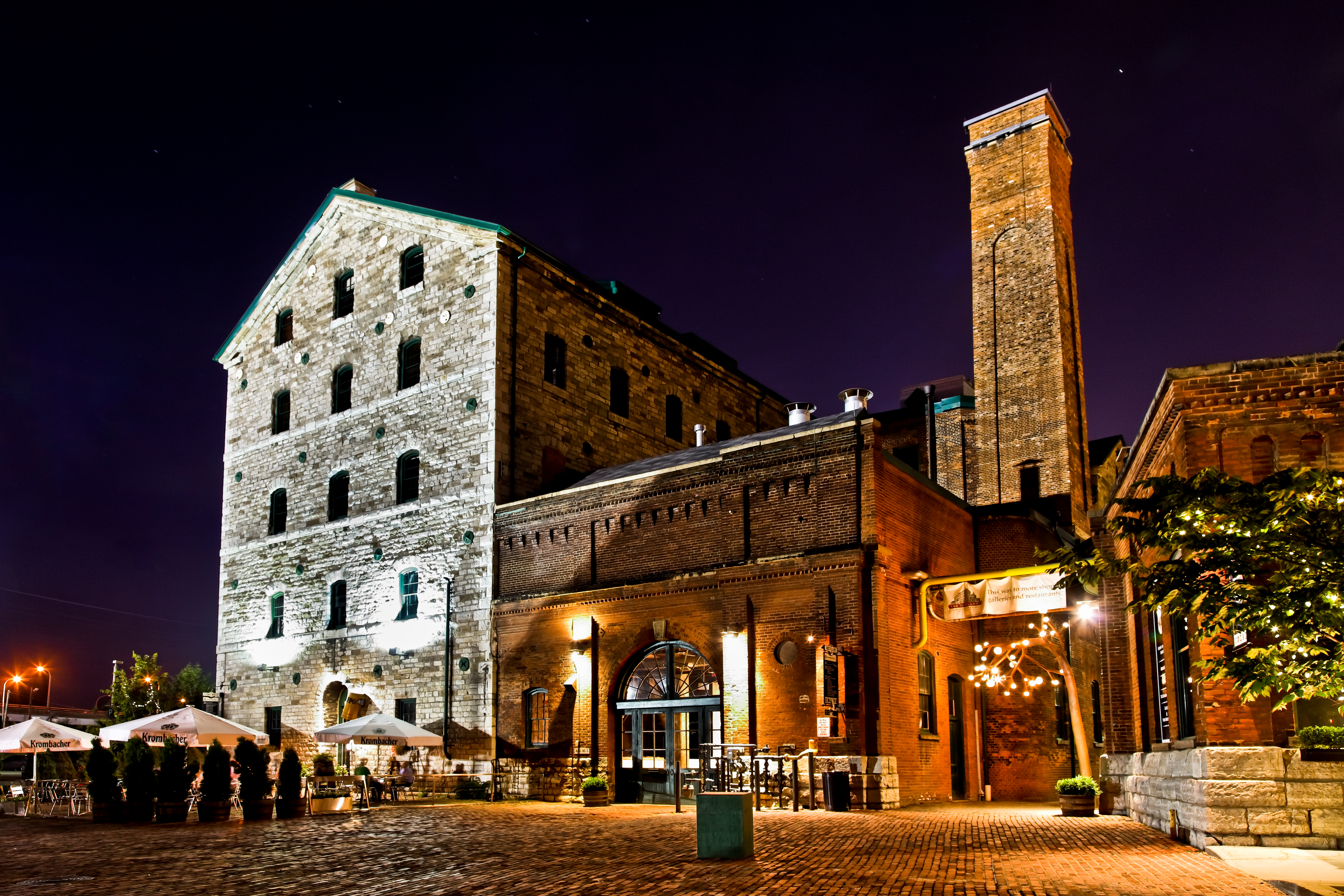
The Stone Distillery (left) next to the Boiler House (centre-right).

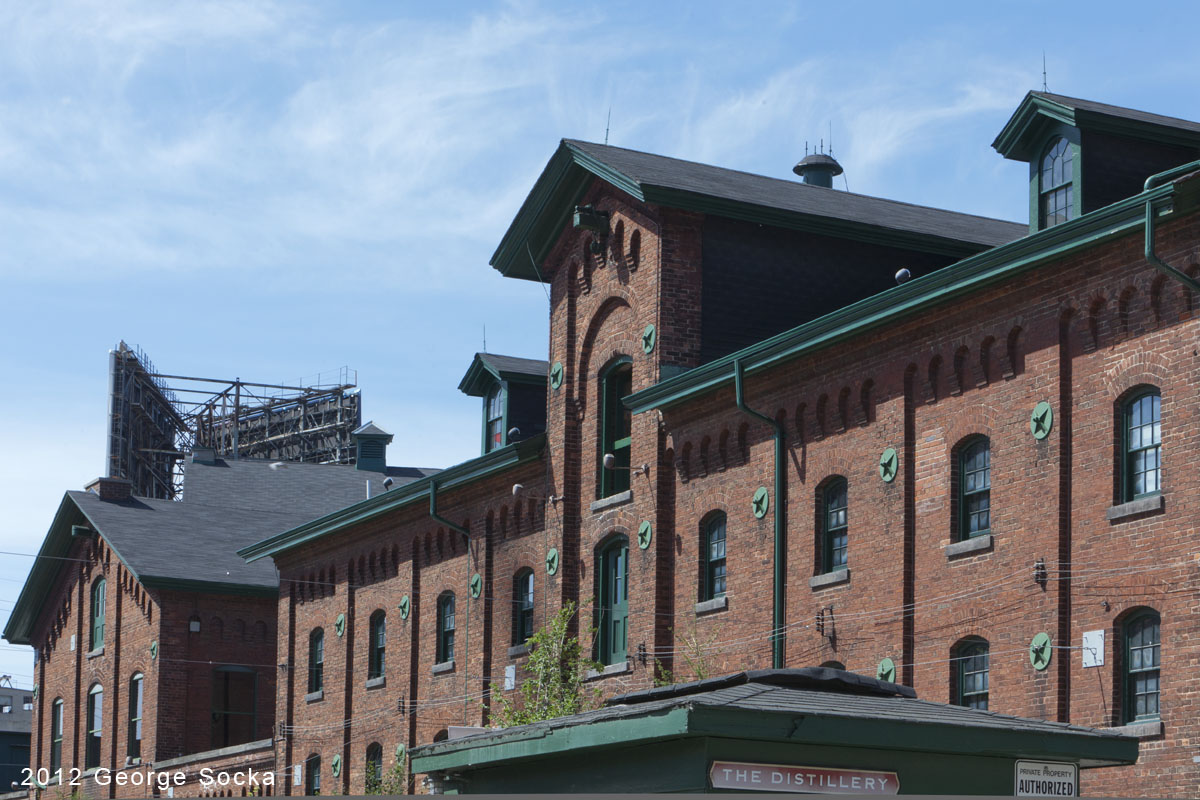
The Malt House, or the Maltings building. The Cooperage is visible in the background.

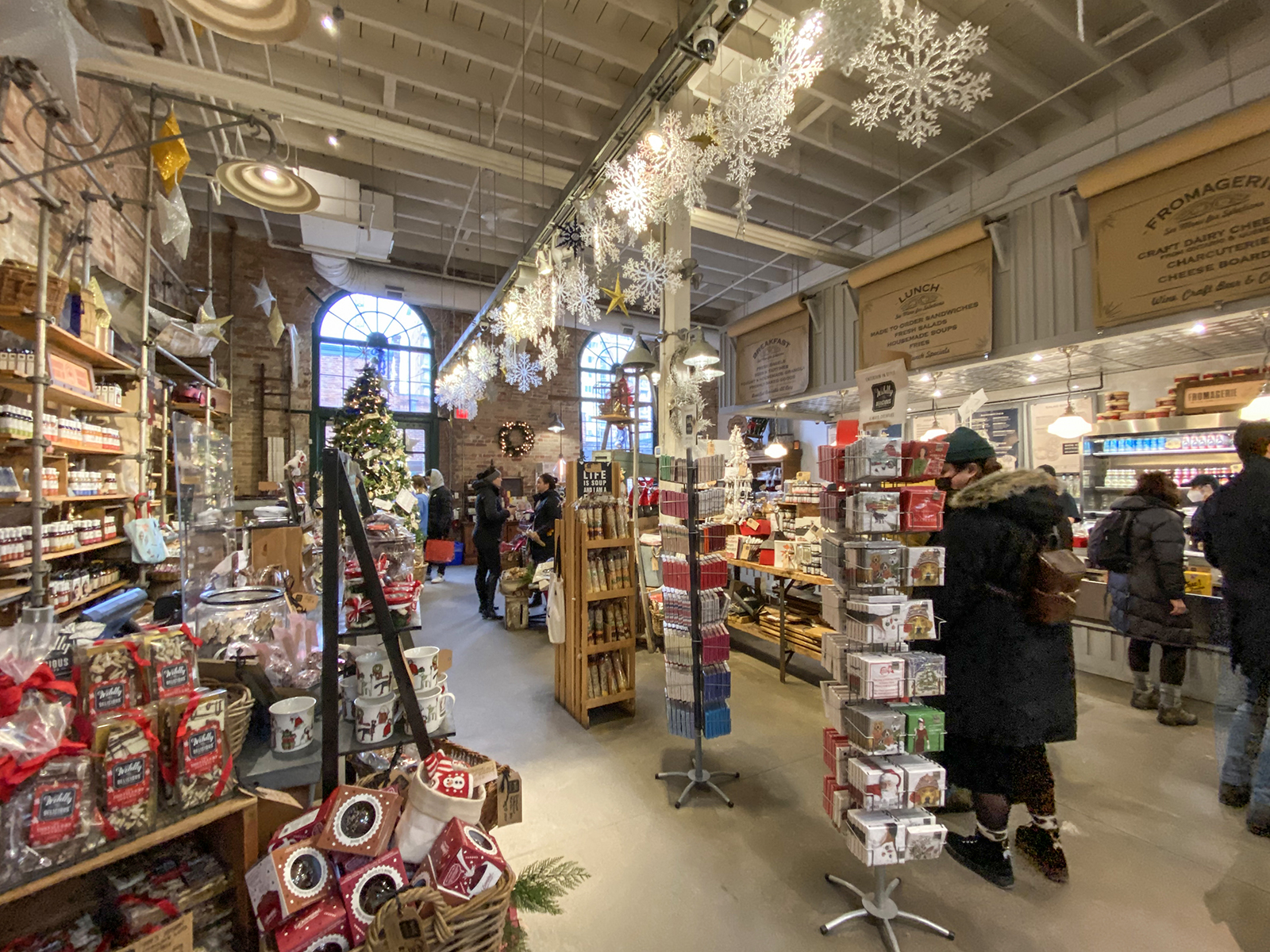
Wildly Delicious Fine Foods

The former distillery consisted of a series of buildings, centred around a seven-storey windmill and wharf. Although the windmill and wharf have long since been demolished, a number of buildings from distillery operations remain. These historical buildings include:

- Stone Distillery, 1859
- Boiler House, c. 1859–1860
- Boiler House/Drying Annex, c. 1859–1860
- Yeast Store, c. 1859–1860
- Malt House, c. 1863
- Paint House, c. 1863–1864
- Cooperage Building, c. 1863–1864
- Office, c. 1863–1864
- Rectifying Building, c. 1863–1864
- Carpenter's Shop, c. 1863–1864
- Cooper's Yard, c. 1863–1864
- Kilns Building, c. 1863–1864
- Fermenting cellar, 1869
- Cannery buildings, 1873
- Pure Spirits buildings, 1873
- Pure Spirits tank houses, 1873
- Maintenance Shop, c. 1877–1880
- Paint Shop, c. 1877–1880
- Stables buildings, 1877–1880
- Denaturing Room, c. 1884
- Molasses Tank, c. 1884–1889
- Tank House 4, c. 1884–1889
- East Boiler House, 1886
- Office and Cooperage, 1886
- Lunch Room, c. 1887
- Tank House 9, 1889
- Tank House 10, 1889
- Long Room, c. 1884–1891
- Rack House D, c. 1884–1891
- Rack House G, c. 1884–1891
- Rack House H, c. 1884–1891
- Rack House I, c. 1884–1891
- Rack House J, c. 1884–1891
- Pump House, 1896
- Case Goods House, 1927
- Rack House M, 1927

== Demographics ==
The 2006 Census revealed that the population of the Distillery is largely composed of young adult to middle aged persons aged twenty to fifty-nine. Most households contain one to two persons. The immigrant population of the area is largely made up of persons of European descent with the overwhelming majority of the population not being visible minorities. The occupation data for the neighbourhood shows that almost a fifth of the residents work in social science/education/government service/religion. Those with jobs in sales and service, business, and arts/culture/recreation/and sports make up a total of 48% of the occupation categories, with an even split of 16% to each job category.

== See also ==
- Gooderham Building, offices for the Gooderham & Worts distillery in Toronto's St. Lawrence neighbourhood
- List of oldest buildings and structures in Toronto
