= Mary Reford Gooderham =

American-Canadian philanthropist (1863-1955)

Lady Mary Reford Gooderham
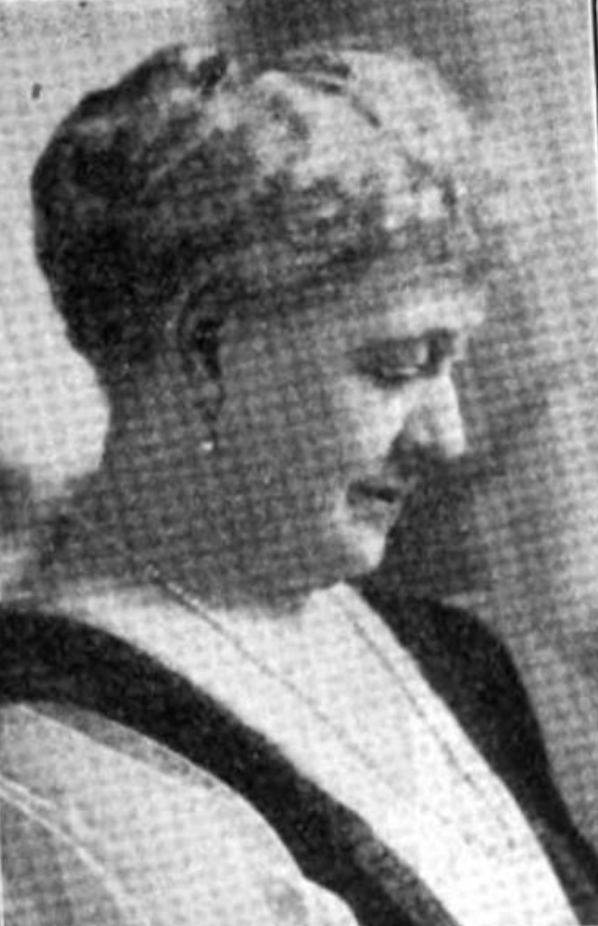
- Gooderham in 1925
- Born: Marietta Reford Duncanson; September 28, 1863; Trenton, Michigan, U.S.
- Died: March 18, 1955 (aged 91); Toronto, Canada
- Occupation: philanthropist

Lady Mary Reford Gooderham (September 28, 1863 - March 18, 1955) was an American-born Canadian philanthropist. She served as National President of the Imperial Order Daughters of the Empire (IODE).

== Early life and education ==
Marietta Reford Duncanson was born in Trenton, Michigan, on September 28, 1863. Her parents were Andrew Duncanson of Argyleshire, Scotland, and Melinda (Nutson) Duncanson. She was brought to Canada at the age of two.

Gooderham was educated in Windsor, Ontario, Canada.

== Career ==
In 1901, Gooderham became a member of the National Executive of the IODE. She served as Treasurer of its South African Graves Committee, 1902–1918; and National Secretary, National Vice-president, and National President, 1912–19. She organized the Royal Grenadiers Chapter, Toronto Border Chapter, Malden Chapter, Amherstburg, and Sir John Gibson Chapter, Toronto.

In 1913, with her husband, Colonel Albert Gooderham, she established the IODE Preventorium (later renamed the IODE Hospital for Convalescents). Also jointly with her husband, she equipped the Daughters of the Empire Hospital for Officers, No. 1 Hyde Park Place, London, England, during World War I. The couple founded the Canadian Academy of Music, which later became the Royal Conservatory of Music.

She organized the Protestant Federation of Patriotic Women(later renamed Protestant Women's Federation), and was President of the council.

She served as Honorary President of the Social Hygiene Club, Toronto; Honorary Vice-president, Women's Auxiliary Conservative Association; and Honorary Vice-president, Toronto and York Command, GWVA Auxiliary. She was a member of the executive committee of the Dominion Branch of Canadian Women's Army Corps (CWCA); Executive Committee, New Symphony Orchestra; and Board of Directors, St. James' Women's Club.

She was a Member of the Ladies' Committee Canadian Red Cross, which was organized on the outbreak of the South African War, and thereafter, served as a Member of the Red Cross Executive Committee until after World War I.

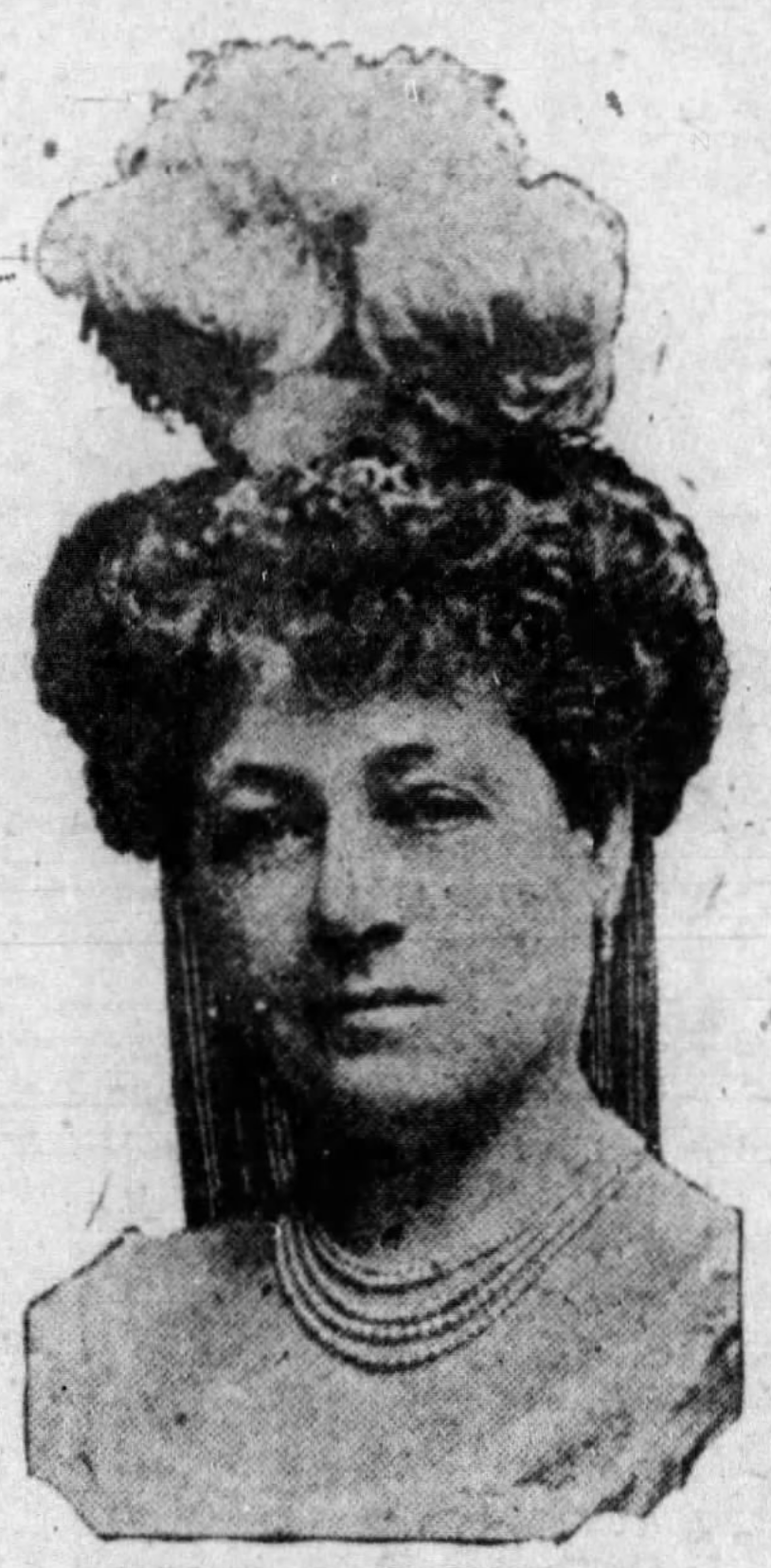
Gooderham in 1922

She was also a Member of the Royal Canadian Institute, 1912–18; Royal Canadian Institute, 1912–18; and Women's Auxiliary Central Branch, Great War Veterans' Association (GWVA). Gooderham was also affiliated with several other clubs, including, Rosedale Golf, Toronto Hunt, Toronto Ladies, Ladies' Empire (London, England), Women's Art Association, Toronto Women's Musical, and Women's Canadian.

She inaugurated the celebration of Queen Alexandra Rose Day in Canada, which became national, and in 1918, she funded the Ukrainian translation of the Canadian Book of Common Prayer.

== Awards and honours ==
- Created Lady of Grace of the Order of the Hospital of St. John of Jerusalem, 1913
- Presented by the Government of France with a Medal, in recognition of war services (one of four only presented in the Dominion)
- Presented with Medal of the Secours National from Académie Française, in recognition of war services, 1917
- Received Special Service Decoration from the Navy League in England

== Personal life ==
On October 25, 1883, she married Albert E. Gooderham. They had two sons and three daughters.

In 1935, after Mr. Gooderham was knighted, Mary became Lady Gooderham.

In politics, she was Conservative. In religion, she was Anglican. Her residence, "Deancroft" was in Rosedale, Toronto.

She was invited by Royal Command to attend Coronation of King George V. at Westminster Abbey, 1911.

== Death and legacy ==
Mary Gooderham died March 18, 1955, in Toronto.

In March 1914, the Mary Gooderham Chapter of the IODE was established.
