= James Gooderham Worts =

Canadian businessman

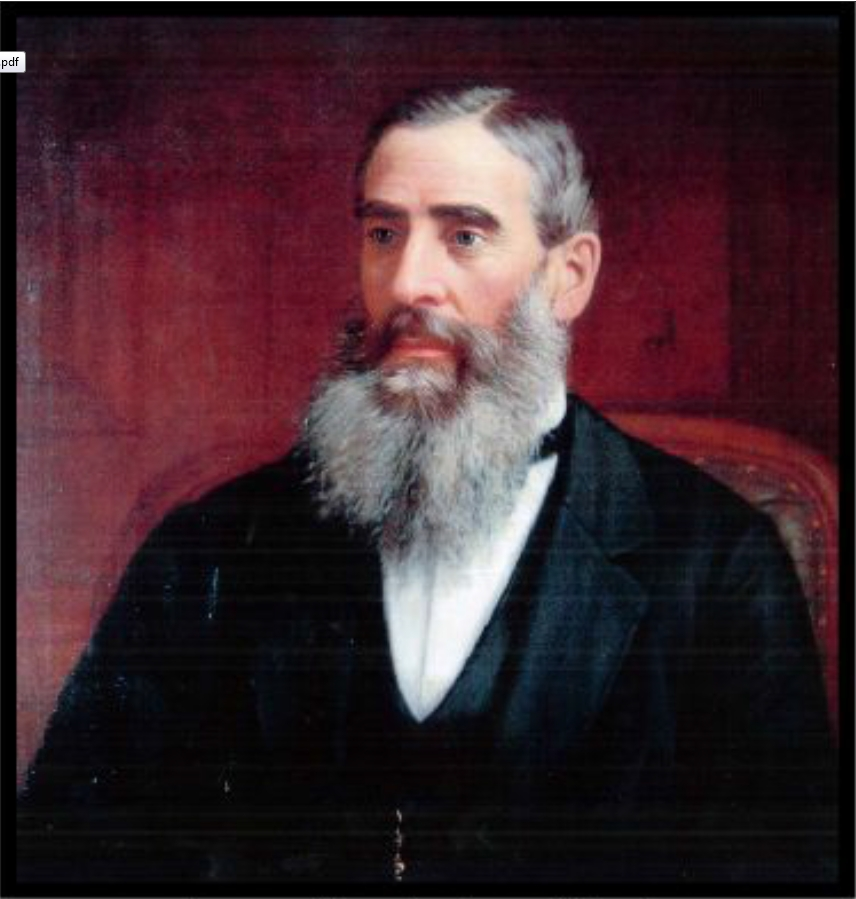
- Born: 1818-06-04; Great Yarmouth, Norfolk, United Kingdom
- Died: 1882-06-20; Toronto, Ontario, Dominion of Canada
- Occupations: distiller, businessman
- Known for: partner in the distiller Gooderham and Worts
- Spouse: Sarah Bright (m. 1840)
- Parent(s): James Worts and Elizabeth Gooderham

James Gooderham Worts (June 4, 1818 - June 20, 1882) was the eldest son of James Worts and Elizabeth Gooderham.

James and his father emigrated from England to York, Upper Canada (now Toronto) in 1831, where his father constructed a flour mill at the mouth of the Don River; the rest of their family remained in the United Kingdom. His father's partner in the undertaking was his uncle, his mother's brother William Gooderham who joined them from England in 1832.

His father gave James considerable independent authority, even though he was a teenager, including overseeing the difficult transport of millstones by water, up the St. Lawrence River and across Lake Ontario from Montreal. His mother died in childbirth in 1834 and his father committed suicide two weeks later by drowning himself in a well on his own company's property.

William Gooderham took charge of the business and responsibility for his nephew after James Worts death. In 1837 a distillery was added and in 1845 Worts became a partner in his uncle's firm, which was renamed Gooderham and Worts.

Worts children included:

- James Gordon Worts 1843-1846
- James Gooderham 1853-1884 - whose son James-Gooderham Worts II was named for James Goodherham
- Thomas Frederick Worts 1857-?
- Charlotte Louisa Worts - married William Henry Beatty
