= James Worts =

English businessman (c.1792–1834)

James Worts (c. 1792 – February 18, 1834) was one of the co-founders of the Gooderham and Worts partnership with his brother-in-law, William Gooderham. After Worts death, Gooderham & Worts evolved from a simple mill into a prosperous distilling company that eventually became the largest in the world.

Worts was born in Bungay Parish, Suffolk, England to William Worts and Mary Murfield.

Having first constructed a flour mill in his hometown in Suffolk, England, he eventually moved to York, Upper Canada with his eldest son, James Gooderham Worts in 1831. Once there, he set up another windmill which was completed in 1832.

In February 1834, the wife of James Worts named Elizabeth Gooderham Worts died during childbirth. Elizabeth was the sister of James Worts's partner and brother-in-law William Gooderham Sr. Several weeks later, Worts committed suicide by drowning himself in a well located on the grounds of his own company.
