= Albert Gooderham =

Canadian distiller and financier (1861–1935)

Sir Albert Gooderham
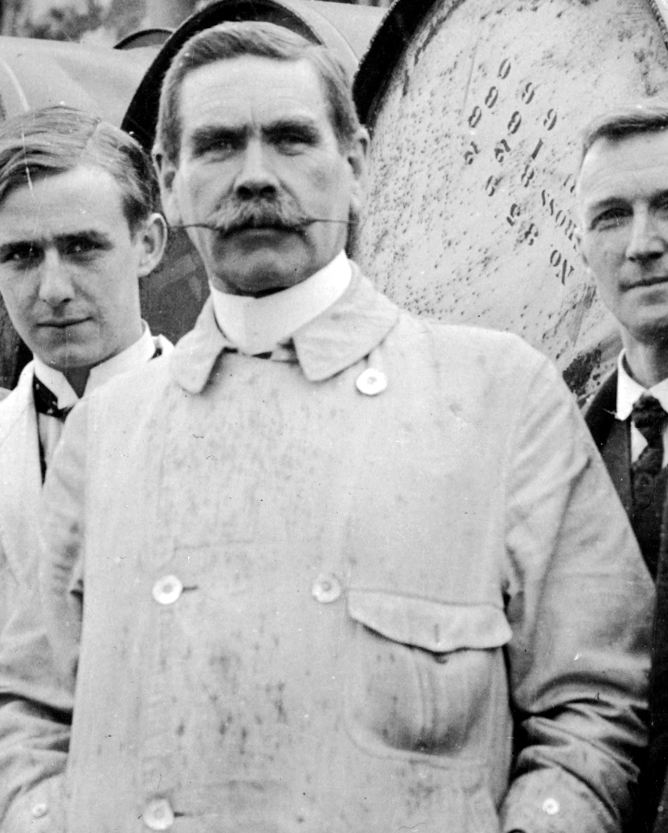
- Born: June 2, 1861; Toronto, Province of Canada
- Died: April 25, 1935 (aged 73); Toronto, Ontario, Canada
- Occupations: distiller, financier, soldier, and philanthropist
- Known for: Member of the Gooderham family of Gooderham and Worts fame
- Spouse: Mary Reford Gooderham
- Parent(s): George Gooderham Sr. Harriet Dean

Colonel Sir Albert Edward Gooderham, KCMG (June 2, 1861 – April 25, 1935) was a Canadian distiller, financier, soldier, and philanthropist.

== Life and career ==
Born in Toronto, he was a son of George Gooderham Sr. (1830–1905), an eminent businessman, and his wife Harriet Dean. His grandfather was William Gooderham, a founder of the Gooderham and Worts distillery.

Gooderham became a managing director at Gooderham and Worts in 1905, and vice-president in 1912. His brother, George Horace Gooderham, also worked at the company. Outside of the family business, Gooderham served in various corporations, including the Bank of Toronto, the Canada Permanent Mortgage Corporation, the Confederation Life Association, and the Dominion of Canada Guarantee and Accident Company.

Gooderham joined the 10th Royal Grenadiers as a second lieutenant in 1885 and later commanded the unit. He was also the chairman of the Ontario branch of the Red Cross, and he donated farm land for the establishment of Connaught Laboratories north of Toronto.

Gooderham founded the Canadian Academy of Music in 1911, and he invited Luigi von Kunits to Canada to teach at the academy. In 1929, Gooderham survived the stock market crash with his fortune largely intact. During the financial crisis that followed, he kept the Toronto Symphony Orchestra from bankruptcy.

Gooderham was made a Knight Commander of the Order of St Michael and St George (KCMG) in the 1935 New Year Honours list. He died later that year on April 25, 1935.
