= Bank of Toronto =

Canadian bank (1855–1955)

- Industry: Banking
- Founded: 18 March 1855
- Defunct: 31 January 1955
- Fate: Merged with the Dominion Bank
- Successor: Toronto-Dominion Bank
- Headquarters: 55 King Street W, Toronto, Ontario

The Bank of Toronto was a Canadian bank that was founded in 1855 by a group of grain dealers and flour millers. On February 1, 1955, it merged with the Dominion Bank to form the Toronto-Dominion Bank. Its first president was James Grant Chewett, whose support was sought by financier Thomas Clarkson.

== History ==
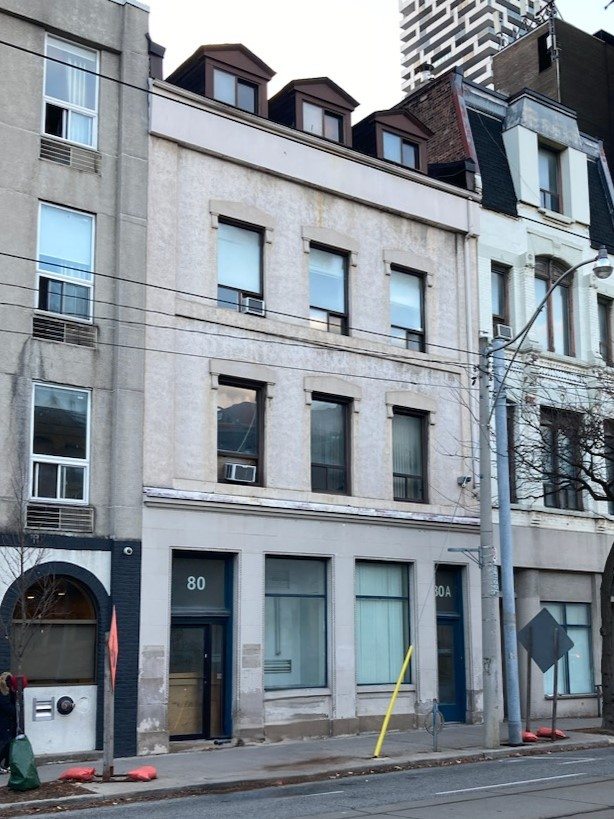
From 1855 to 1893, the bank was headquartered at 78 Church Street (now renumbered 80 Church)

In July 1856, the Bank of Toronto opened its offices at 78 Church Street, Toronto, with a staff of three and immediately began development of a provincial network of branches. Thomas Clarkson, a major participant in the growing Toronto commerce, served as one of the first directors from 1856 through to 1858, steering the Bank through the depression of 1857. In 1860, it opened its first branch outside of Ontario (then as Canada West), in Montreal, Canada East.

The Bank of Toronto established itself as an efficient, profitable, but essentially conservative bank through the 19th century. It maintained a very high reserve against its capital and enjoyed the highest share price of any bank in Canada. Growth was very slow and deliberate, with a few new branches opened in emerging regional centres. Core customers remained farmers, merchants, and processors of farm products (millers, brewers, distillers).

With the maturing of the Canadian economy and the opening of northern Ontario and the West in the 1880s and 1890s, the banks became more aggressive in loans to resource industries, utilities, and manufacturing. In 1899, the Bank of Toronto opened a branch in the British Columbia mining town of Rossland. In the first decade of the twentieth century, the banks rapidly expanded their branch networks in central Canada and across the west.

To mark their rise as significant national institutions, the Bank of Toronto moved into a large new head office building at the corner of King and Bay Streets in Toronto in 1913.

World War I brought new challenges for the two banks when they were called upon to finance war expenditures and to support the innovation of war bonds marketed to the general public. Half of the staff of the two banks served in the armed forces. Except for some contraction in the western provinces due to drought, the decade following the war was one of expansion and increasing profitability due to resource development and industrial expansion. The bank weathered the storm of depression in the 1930s without great difficulty, despite a decline in earnings. Like all Canadian banks, they endured criticism of its credit policies and resisted the introduction of a central bank to control the money supply and advise on fiscal policy. Ultimately the Bank of Canada was established and the banks relinquished their right to issue their own currency.

The coming of the Second World War involved the banks, once again, in the marketing of war bonds and in participation in the control of foreign exchange, rationing, and other financial war measures. Approximately 500 staff, or almost half the total, entered the armed forces.

The Bank of Toronto emerged from the war in 1945 stronger than ever, with assets more than doubled since 1939. With the post-war boom they became more active in business lending and in the penetration of new markets. However, they quickly realized that the costs of expansion and competition with much larger rivals made their objectives difficult to realize. Neither bank had engaged in acquisitions or mergers in order to grow, but both determined that a union with a bank of equal size would place them in a much stronger position to take advantage of the opportunities of the post-war economy.

== Amalgamation ==
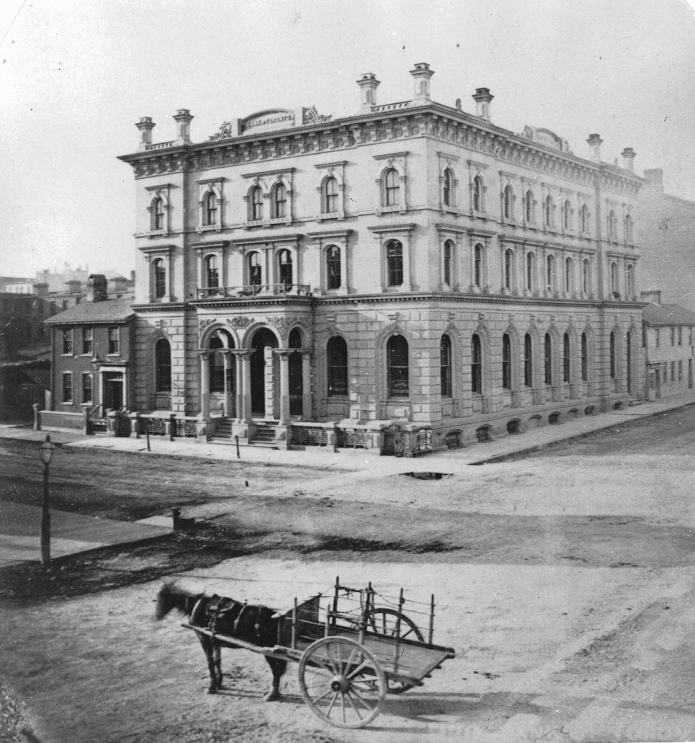
The bank's 1893 headquarters at 60 Wellington St East, designed by William Kauffmann. It was demolished in 1961.

In 1954, negotiations began between the Bank of Toronto and the Dominion Bank, and by the end of the year, an amalgamation agreement was reached. In their brief to the Minister of Finance, the banks stated: "It is more burdensome for a small bank to keep pace with the development of our country than for a large bank, with the result that the effective growth and comparative influence of smaller banks will probably in the future decline in comparison with that of the larger banks."

On November 1, 1954, Canada's minister of finance announced that the amalgamation was accepted and shareholders were asked for their approval. This was forthcoming in December and on February 1, 1955, the Bank of Toronto and the Dominion Bank became the Toronto-Dominion Bank.

The building at 78 Church Street was listed on the City of Toronto Heritage Property Inventory on August 14, 1991, in hopes of preserving some of its historical physical attributes.

== Leadership ==
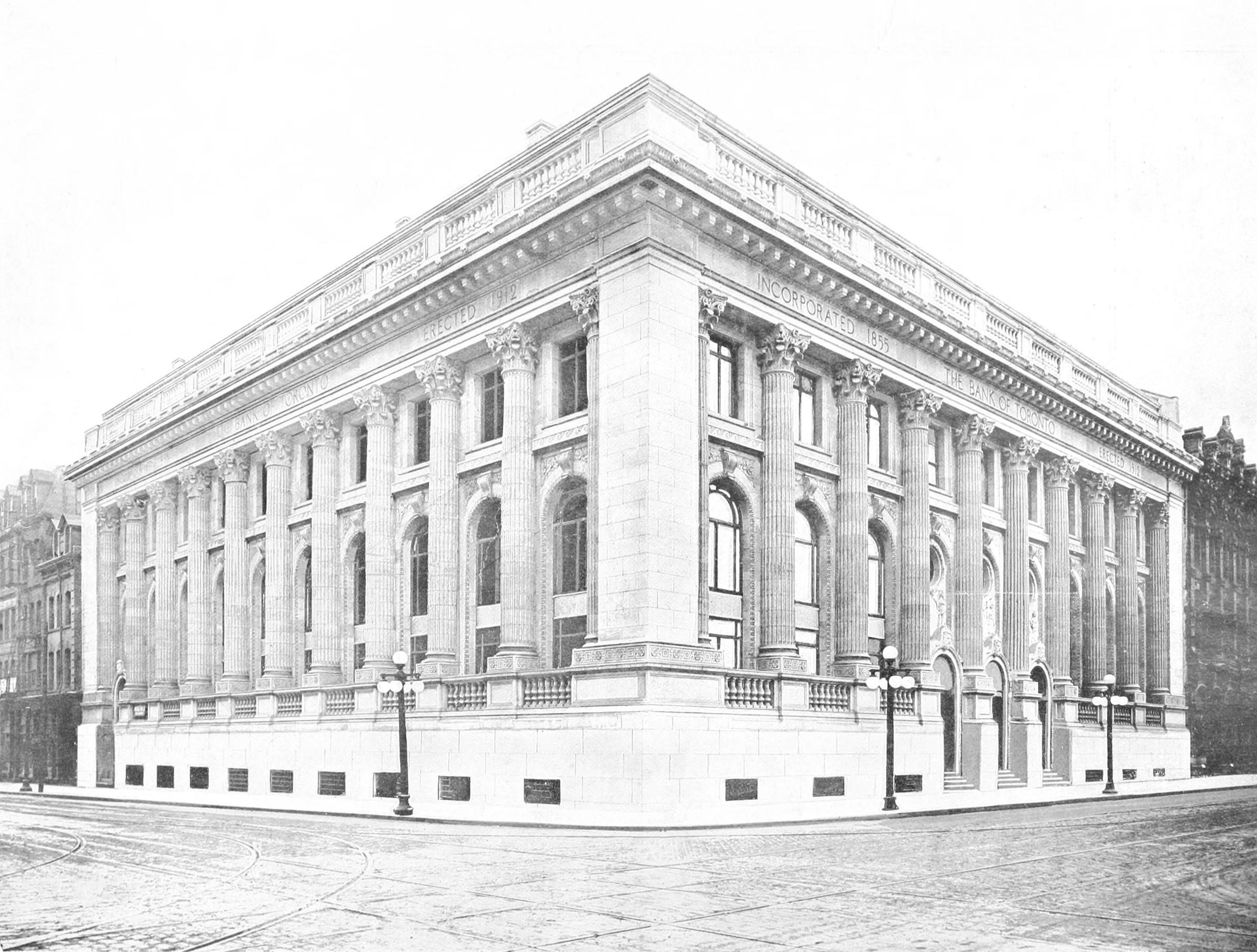
The bank's 1912 headquarters at 55 King West, designed by Carrère and Hastings with Eustace G. Bird. It was demolished in 1966 to make way for the Toronto-Dominion Centre.

The bank's presidents and chairmen were:

=== President ===
1. James Grant Chewett, 1850–1862
2. Angus Cameron, 1863–1864
3. William Gooderham, 1864–1881
4. George Gooderham, 1881–1905
5. William Henry Beatty, 1905–1910
6. Duncan Coulson, 1910–1916
7. William George Gooderham, 1916–1934
8. John Robert Lamb, 1934–1941
9. Francis Hedley Marsh, 1941–1947
10. James Laurie Carson, 1947–1951
11. Byron Samuel Vanstone, 1951–1955

=== Chairman of the Board ===
1. John Robert Lamb, 1941–1944
2. Francis Hedley Marsh, 1947–1949
3. James Laurie Carson, 1951–1955

== Architecture ==
The following Bank of Toronto buildings are on the Registry of Historic Places in Canada:

- Bank of Toronto at 205 Yonge Street in Toronto, Ontario built in 1905
- Bank of Toronto in Winnipeg, Manitoba erected in 1905-1906
- Bank of Toronto Building in Chaplin, Saskatchewan built in 1915
- Bank of Toronto Vault in Turtle Mountain, Manitoba, completed in 1919
- Bank of Toronto Building in Victoria, British Columbia built in 1951

Andrew Taylor designed the Bank of Toronto at St. James Street & McGill Street, which was erected in 1893-1894.

== Gallery of branches ==
Toronto (Yonge)

Toronto (Queen & Spadina)

Toronto (College & Dovercourt)

Toronto (Dundas & Ossington)

Hamilton

Kitchener

Winnipeg

Galt

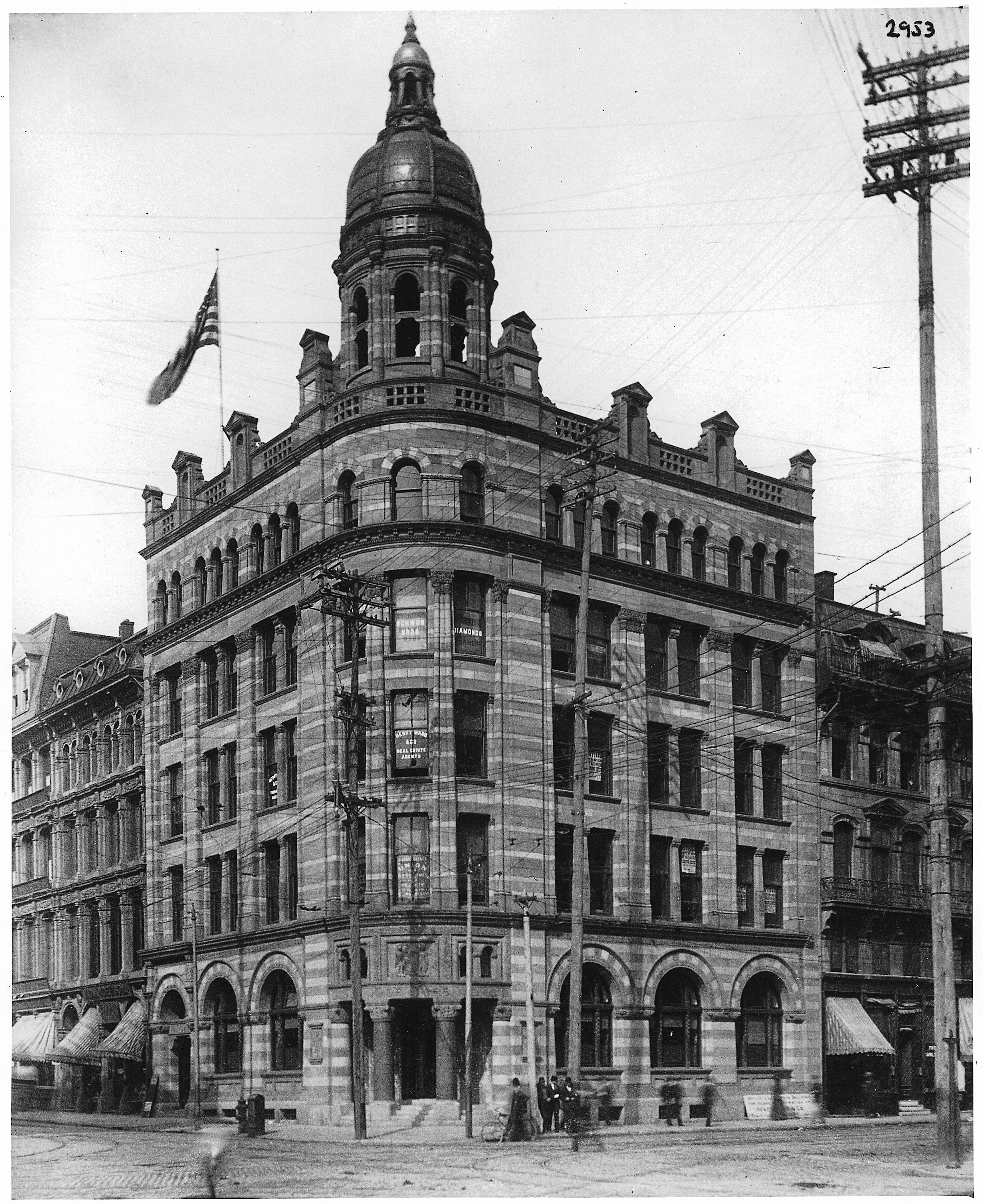
Montreal (first main)

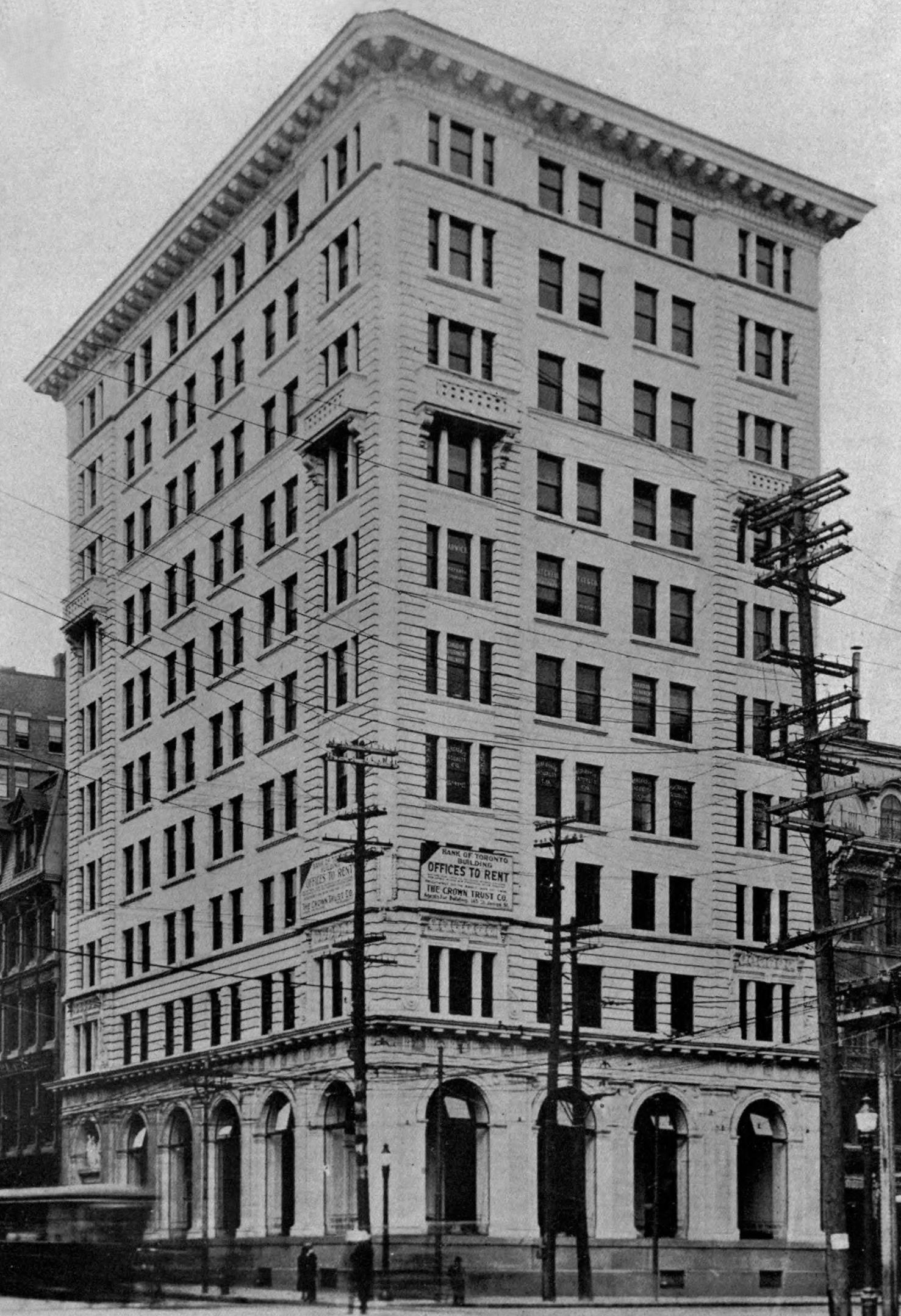
Montreal (second main)

Montreal (St Catherine & Guy)

Maisonneuve

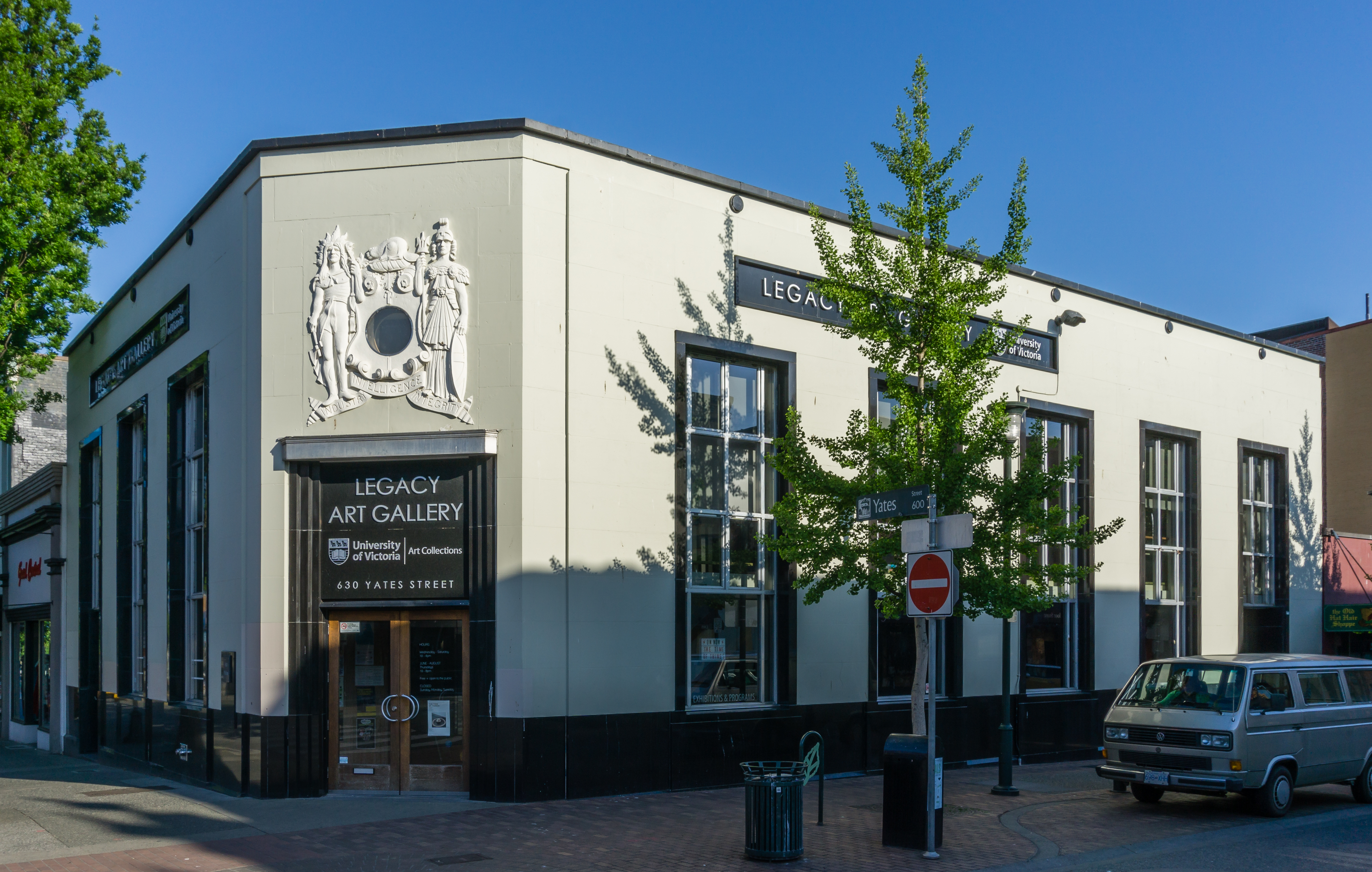
Victoria

== See also ==
- List of Canadian banks

== Bibliography ==
- "The Distillery Historic District". Archived from the original on 15 November 2010.
- "The Bank of Toronto 1857 Annual Report (PDF)" (PDF). Archived from the original (PDF) on May 15, 2011.
- R. J. Graham `Canadian Bank Notes 6th Edition: A Charlton Standard Catalogue` Charlton Press July 17, 2008
