= William Gooderham Sr. =

Canadian distiller and banker (1790–1881)

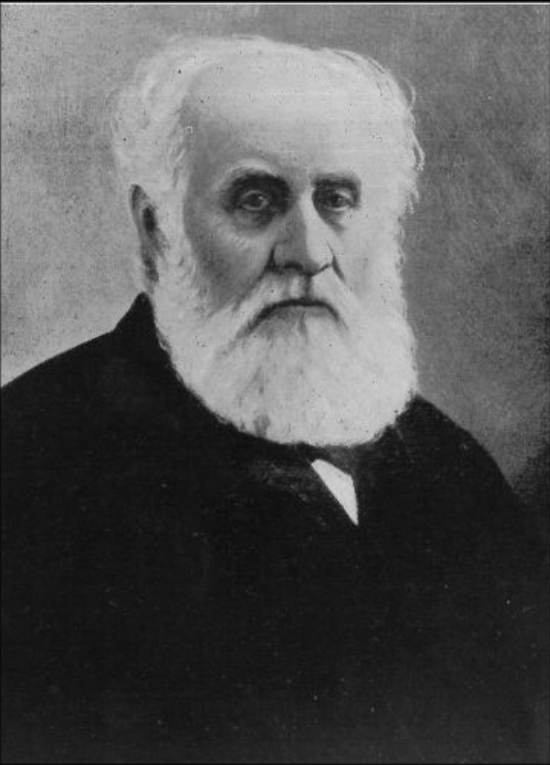
- Born: August 29, 1790; Scole, Norfolk, England
- Died: August 20, 1881 (aged 90); Toronto, Ontario, Canada
- Occupations: Distiller, businessman, and banker
- Known for: Founder of Gooderham and Worts distillery
- Children: 15, including: William Gooderham Jr. George Gooderham; James Gooderham; Charles Horace Gooderham
- Relatives: Albert Gooderham, grandson; George Horace Gooderham, grandson; James Gooderham Worts, nephew

William Gooderham Sr. (August 29, 1790 – August 20, 1881) was a British-born Canadian distiller, businessman, and banker. He was a founder of the Gooderham and Worts distillery.

== Life and career ==
Born in Scole, Norfolk, England, the son of James and Sarah Gooderham, he immigrated to York, Upper Canada (now Toronto) in 1832 to invest and partner in a wind-powered flour mill with his brother-in-law, James Worts. Briefly operating as Worts and Gooderham until Worts' death in 1834, Gooderham continued to operate the mill as the William Gooderham Company.

In 1837, he added a distillery to make efficient use of surplus and second-grade grain. Having taken Worts' son, James Gooderham Worts, under his guidance since Worts' death, they became partners in 1845 and renamed the company as Gooderham and Worts.

Expanding their business, they introduced gas for illumination, expanded the use of steam power in the plants and built their own wharf to ship their consignments. By the 1860s, they owned schooners on the Great Lakes. During the 1860s and 1870s, Gooderham was a community and business leader in the Toronto industrial landscape and in transportation and financial services, as well as on the stock exchange, and in the council and the board of arbitration of the Toronto Board of Trade.

In the summer of 1842, he participated with Bishop John Strachan in the founding meeting of Little Trinity Anglican Church, where he later was a warden for 30 years. A marble memorial for Gooderham is mounted on the west wall inside the church.

In 1864, he was appointed president of the Bank of Toronto.

== Descendants ==
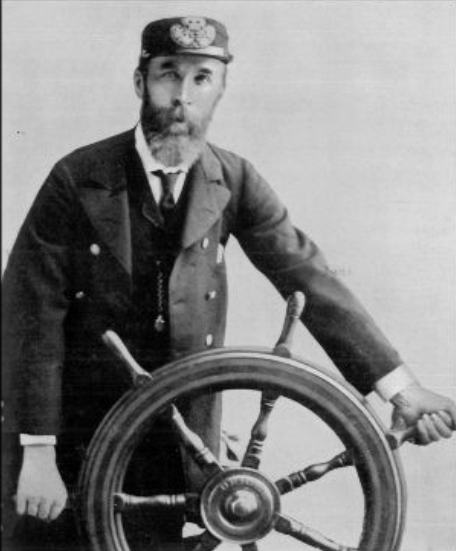
George Gooderham (1830–1905)

His son George Gooderham (1830–1905) was a businessman and philanthropist, his grandson George Horace Gooderham was a businessman and politician, and another grandson, Albert Gooderham, was a financier and philanthropist. His descendants' significance was not limited to Canada – his great-grandson, Dean Gooderham Acheson, born and raised in Connecticut, would serve as the U.S. Secretary of State. Eldest son William George Gooderham (1853-1935) was also a businessman and operating Mineral Springs Limited (later York Springs Bottling and Okeefe Springs) in Hoggs Hollow near his 1907 home on Yonge Street. He was also the president of the Bank of Toronto until his death.

In 1870, his son Charles Horace Gooderham (1844–1904) built a residence in Meadowvale (now part of Mississauga) – a Georgian Revival manor at 929 Old Derry Road. It was sold in 1884 and is now the Rotherglen School's Meadowvale Elementary Campus, a private Montessori school.

Charles Horace Gooderham also built a Queen Anne Revival mansion in Toronto at 592 Sherbourne Street in 1883, which became the Selby Hotel in 1912. The historic building was moved a short distance on its site in 2015 in order to incorporate it into a new apartment complex called The Selby.

== See also ==
- York-Durham Heritage Railway
- Northern Railway of Canada
- Toronto and Nipissing Railway
- Toronto Harbour Commission
