= Gooderham and Worts =

Canadian alcoholic beverage distiller

Gooderham & Worts Limited
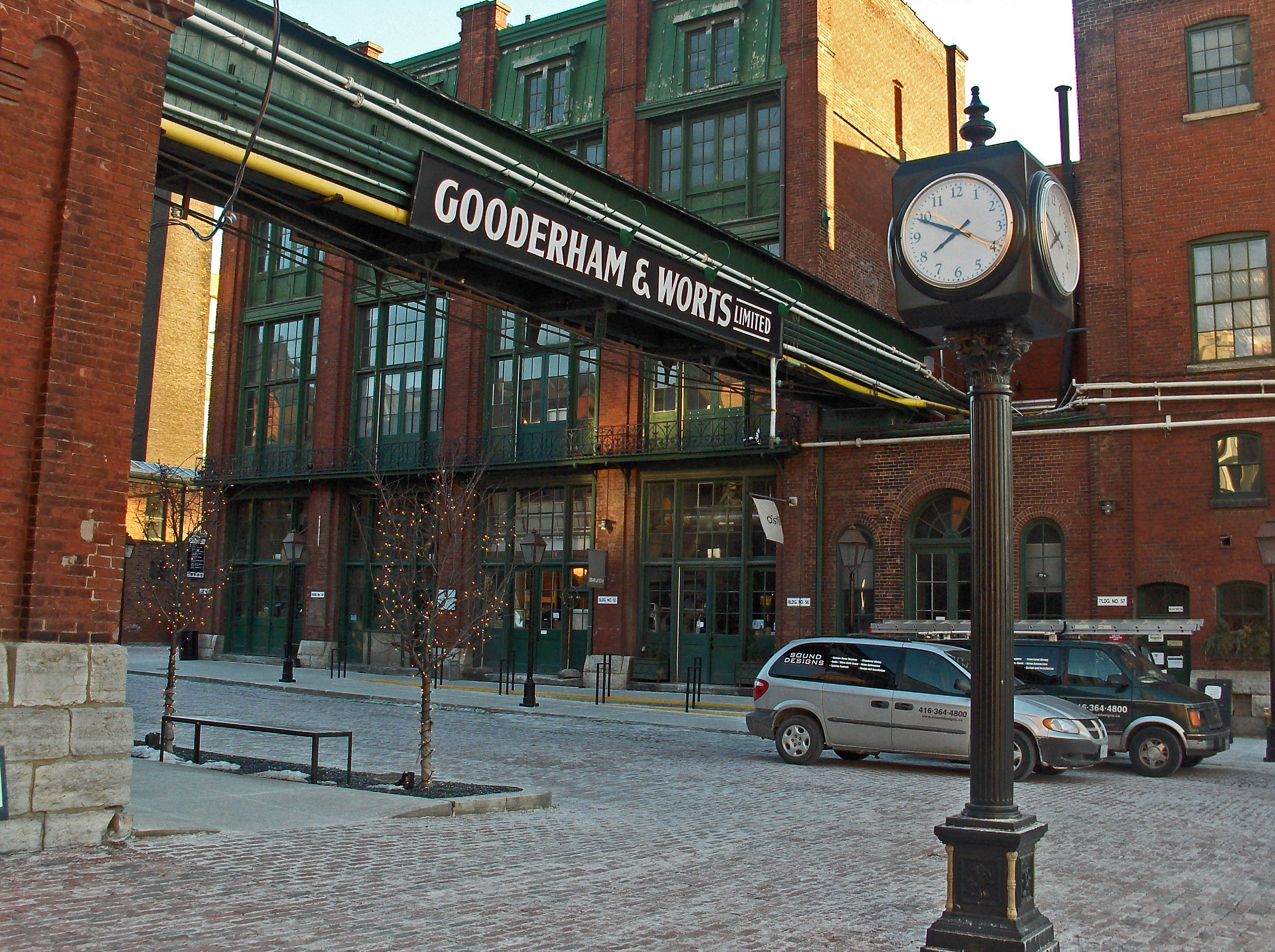
- Industry: Distiller of alcoholic beverages
- Founded: 1869
- Fate: Merged with Hiram Walker & Sons Ltd. in 1926; sold to Allied Lyons in 1987, itself now owned by Pernod Ricard
- Headquarters: Toronto, Ontario, Canada
- Key people: James Worts; William Gooderham Sr.; James Gooderham Worts; Albert Gooderham; George H. Gooderham

Gooderham and Worts, also known as Gooderham & Worts Limited, was a Canadian distiller of alcoholic beverages. It was once one of the largest distillers in Canada. The company was merged in 1926 with Hiram Walker & Sons Ltd., and the merged firm was eventually sold to Allied Lyons in 1987.

The company's distillery facility was named one of the National Historic Sites of Canada in 1988. The company's on site operations ceased in the 1990s and the facility on the Toronto waterfront was closed. The buildings, dating to the 1860s, were preserved and repurposed as an arts and entertainment district called the Distillery District.

== Early history ==
The business was founded by James Worts and his brother-in-law, William Gooderham. Worts had owned a mill in Diss, England, then moved to Toronto in 1831 and established himself in the same line of work. He built a prominent windmill on the Toronto waterfront, near the mouth of the Don River. The next year, Gooderham joined him in Toronto and in the business. The business prospered, processing grain from Ontario farmers and then shipping it out via the port of Toronto.

In 1834, Worts's wife, Elizabeth, died during childbirth. Two weeks later, Worts killed himself by throwing himself into the windmill's well and drowning. Gooderham continued the business himself. With a surplus of wheat, Gooderham expanded in 1837 into brewing and distilling, and soon this lucrative trade became the primary focus of the business. Gooderham served as the sole manager of the business until 1845, when he made Worts's eldest son, James Gooderham Worts, co-manager.

In 1859, work began on a new distillery complex, the area that today is the Distillery District. It was built on the waterfront, with easy access to Toronto's main train lines. In 1862, its first full year of production, the facility made some 700,000 imperial gallons (3,180,000 litres) of spirits. At that time, it was a full quarter of all the spirits produced in Canada.

== Expansion ==
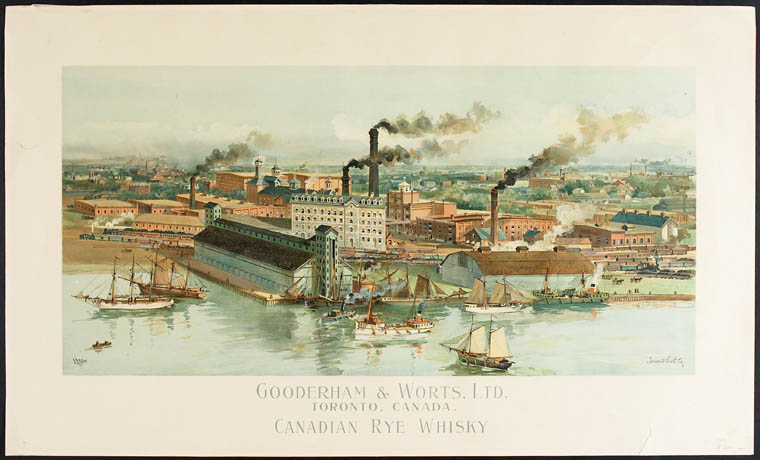
Gooderham and Worts distillery complex

In the second half of the 19th century, the firm rose to become one of Canada's most prominent industrial concerns. Under the control of William's son, George Gooderham (1830–1905), production increased to over two million gallons a year, half of the entire spirits production of Canada. The distillery itself expanded, becoming one of Toronto's largest employers.

As well as keeping interests in the milling and brewing trades, the company expanded into other ventures. It had a controlling interest in the Toronto and Nipissing Railway, one of the main lines that transported grain from the rural regions north of Toronto. In 1892, the company constructed the Gooderham Building, still a notable Toronto landmark, as its new headquarters.

By the end of the nineteenth century, the company's growth began to slow. Beer and wine became more popular in Canada, reducing sales of whisky. The rise of the temperance movement also harmed the company, with the Ontario Temperance Act of 1916 banning the sale of alcohol in the province. The company survived by exporting alcohol beyond Ontario, such as to Quebec, where a good portion would then make its way back to Ontario. The firm also relied on its other ventures, most notably the production of antifreeze, which was essential to the war effort and to the growing number of automobiles.

== Later history ==
In 1923, the company was sold to Harry C. Hatch for $1.5 million. The company gained a large share of the United States market during prohibition, legally manufacturing it in Canada and then selling it to resellers, who would smuggle it into the United States.

In 1926, Hatch purchased Canada's second-largest distiller, Hiram Walker & Sons Ltd., the makers of Canadian Club. The new company was named Hiram Walker-Gooderham & Worts Ltd. It continued manufacturing spirits at the Toronto distillery, but production gradually declined.

In 1927, at a hearing on tax evasion charges against Gooderham and Worts, notorious bootlegger Rocco Perri admitted buying whisky from the distiller from 1924 to 1927. Gooderham and Worts was convicted of tax evasion in 1928 and had to pay a fine of $439,744.

In 1987, the firm was sold to the British concern Allied Lyons. By 1990, the manufacturing facility had been closed down because it was obsolete. During the years the site was vacant, it was used for filming movies and commercials. Some of the films that used the location include Tommy Boy, X-Men, The Hurricane and Chicago. Also used for 40's Harlem in the PAX TV series Twice in A Lifetime and exterior sets for Friday the 13th: The Series.

The site would eventually be converted into the Distillery District, including the Young Centre for the Performing Arts that opened in 2006. The complex has been owned by a group called Cityscape since 2002; the owners were responsible for converting 24 buildings into spaces for artist and galleries.

The Hiram Walker & Sons Distillery, now owned by Pernod Ricard, makes Gooderham & Worts brand whiskies but does so at its plant in Windsor, Ontario. The production of the American bourbon whiskies formerly owned by Gooderham and Worts has since been taken over by Laird & Company.

The distillery complex, and the 30 buildings on the property, were designated as a National Historic Site of Canada in 1988 because "it is an imposing landmark, containing a number of buildings that collectively bear witness to the evolution of the Canadian distilling industry".
