= George Horace Gooderham =

Canadian politician (1868–1942)

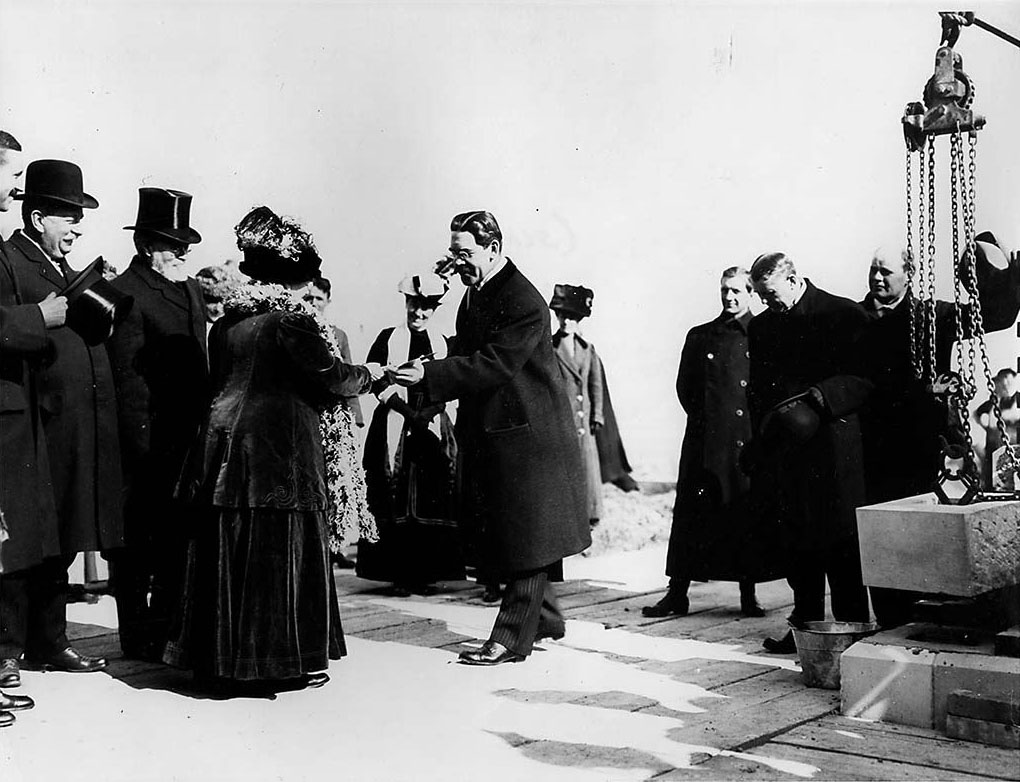
- Gooderham in 1908 (centre of photo), assisting with the laying of a cornerstone

Ontario MPP
- In office 1914–1919
- Preceded by: Riding established
- Succeeded by: John Carman Ramsden
- Constituency: Toronto Southwest (Seat A)
- In office 1908–1914
- Preceded by: J.J. Foy (Note: In 1908, the riding supported two members, denoted by Seat A and Seat B. Foy was the sole representative before 1908.)
- Succeeded by: Riding abolished
- Constituency: Toronto South (Seat B)

Personal details
- Born: April 18, 1868; Toronto, Ontario
- Died: December 22, 1942 (aged 74); Toronto, Ontario
- Political party: Conservative
- Spouse: Cora Maude Northrop
- Occupation: Businessman

George Horace Gooderham (April 18, 1868 – December 22, 1942) was a Canadian businessman and politician. From 1908 to 1919, he was a Conservative member in the Legislative Assembly of Ontario, representing Toronto South and then Toronto Southwest.

== Life and career ==
Born in Toronto, his father was George Gooderham Sr. (1830–1905), a prominent businessman, and his mother was Harriet Dean. He married Cora Maude Northrop.

He worked in the business founded by his grandfather, William Gooderham, which was the Gooderham & Worts distillery. His brother, Albert Gooderham, also worked in the family business.

Gooderham was Commodore of the Royal Canadian Yacht Club in Toronto and served on the school board for Toronto, serving as chair in 1904. He died on December 22, 1942, at Toronto.

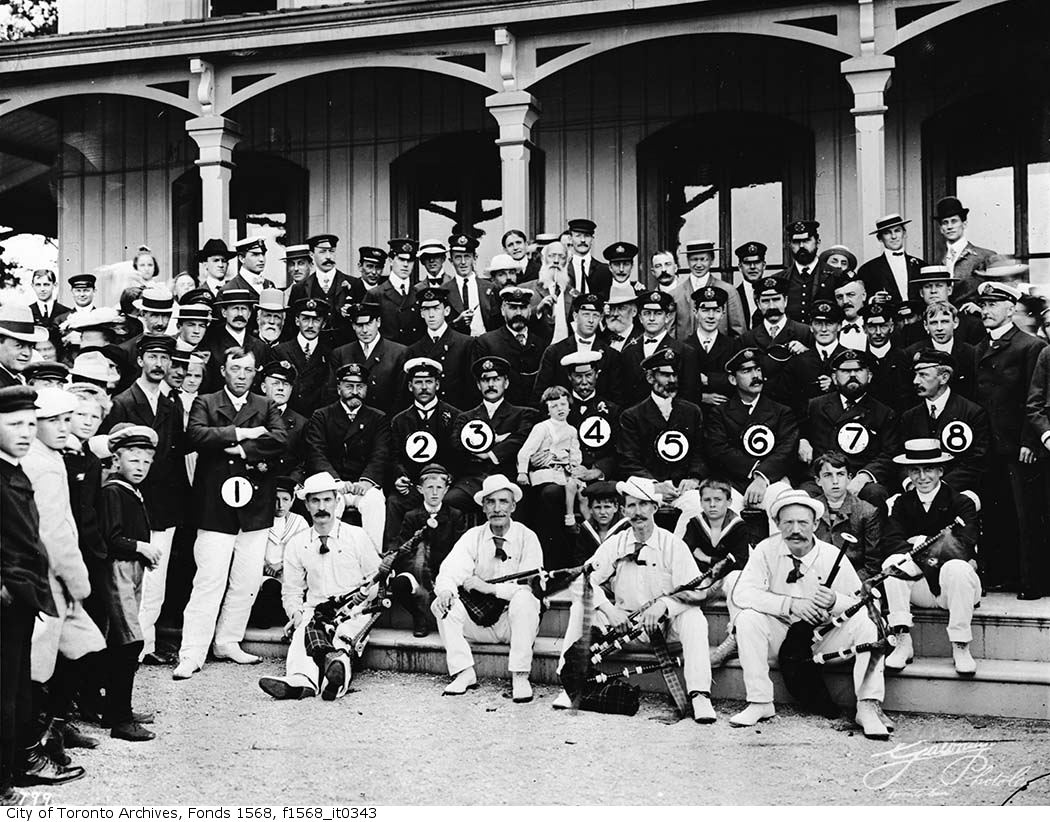
Sir Thomas Lipton (4) at the Royal Canadian Yacht Club in 1903, with Commodore Aemilius Jarvis (5), Vice-Commodore Stephen Haas (3), and George H. Gooderham (6).
