= 2018 Wirral Metropolitan Borough Council election =

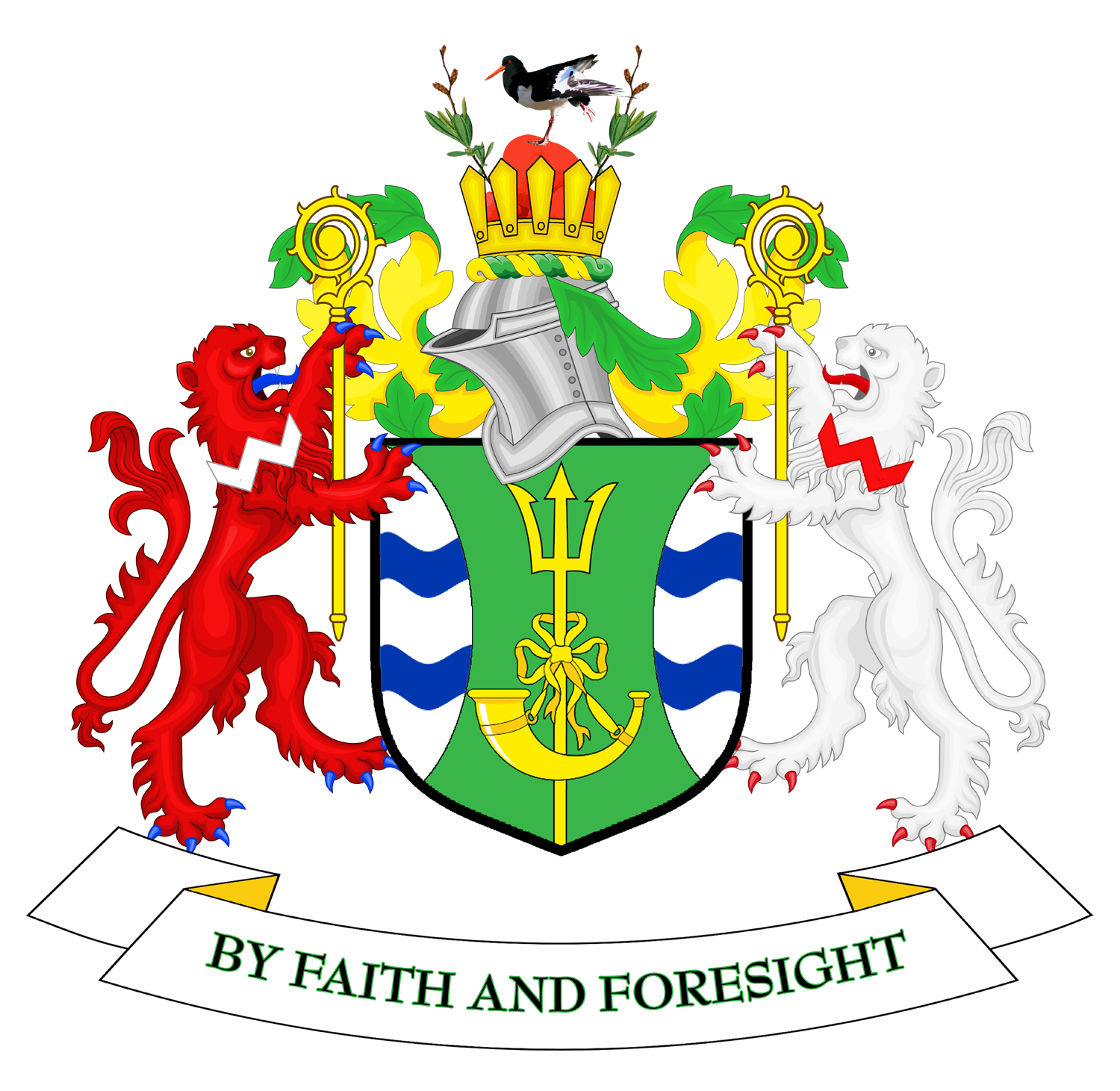
- 3 May 2018

23 of 66 seats (One Third and one by-election) to Wirral Metropolitan Borough Council 34 seats needed for a majority
- Turnout: 36.3% (▲0.7%)
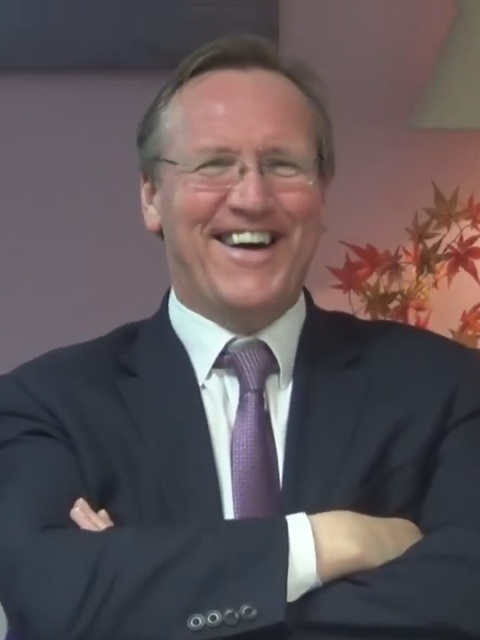

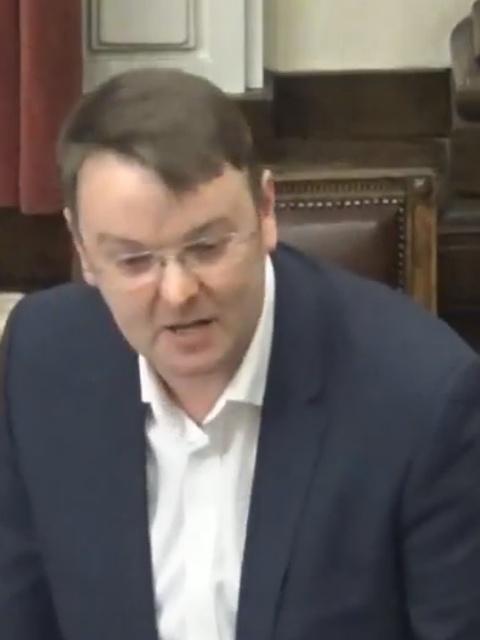

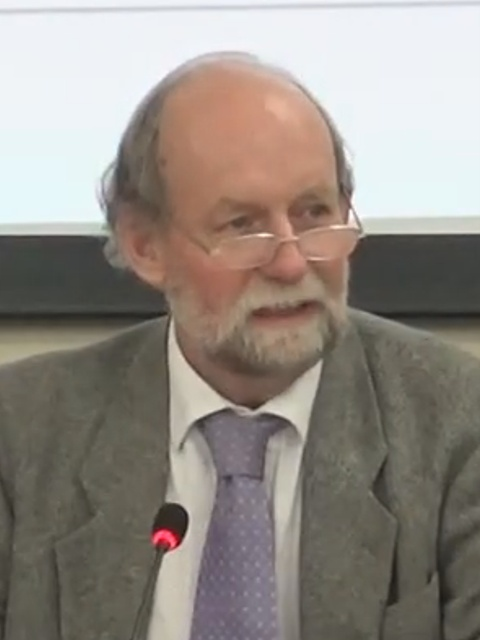

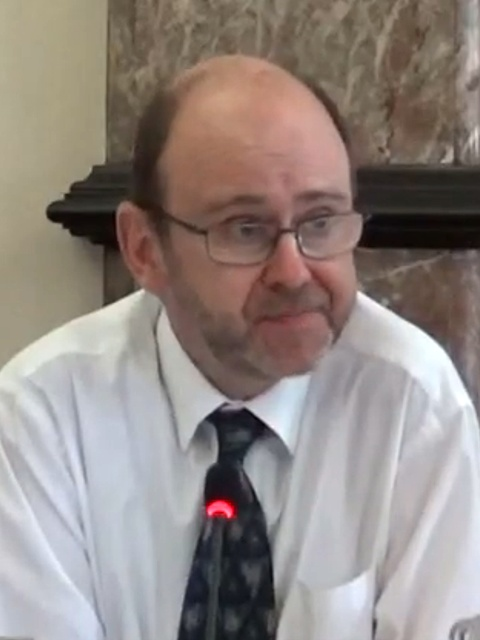
	First party	Second party
Leader	Phil Davies	Ian Lewis
Party	Labour	Conservative
Leader since	29 March 2012	8 May 2017
Leader's seat	Birkenhead and Tranmere	Wallasey
Last election	14 seats, 46.1%	7 seats, 30.8%
Seats before	39	21
Seats won	12	8
Seats after	39	21
Seat change	Steady	Steady
Popular vote	40,092	31,122
Percentage	45.5%	35.3%
Swing	▼0.6%	▲4.5%
	Third party	Fourth party
Leader	Phil Gilchrist	Pat Cleary (Note: As the only Green on the council prior to the election, Pat Cleary was their de facto group leader.)
Party	Liberal Democrats	Green
Leader since	16 May 2013	22 May 2014
Leader's seat	Eastham	Birkenhead and Tranmere
Last election	2 seats, 10.9%	0 seats, 6.8%
Seats before	5	1
Seats won	2	1
Seats after	5	1
Seat change	Steady	Steady
Popular vote	8,993	7,545
Percentage	10.2%	8.6%
Swing	▼0.7%	▲1.8%
- Map of results of 2018 election
Leader of the Council before election
Phil Davies
Labour
Leader of the Council after election
Phil Davies
Labour

The 2018 Wirral Metropolitan Borough Council election took place on 3 May 2018 to elect members of Wirral Metropolitan Borough Council in England. This election was held on the same day as other local elections.

After the election, the composition of the council was:

Party	Seats	±
Labour	39	Steady
Conservative	21	Steady
Liberal Democrat	5	Steady
Green	1	Steady
Source: BBC

== Election results ==
=== Overall election result ===
Overall result compared with 2016.

Wirral Metropolitan Borough Council election result, 2018
Party	Candidates						Votes		
Party	Stood	Elected	Gained	Unseated	Net	% of total	%	No.	Net %
Labour	23	12	0	0	Steady	54.5	45.5	40,092	▼0.6
Conservative	23	8	0	0	Steady	31.8	35.3	31,122	▲4.5
Liberal Democrats	22	2	0	0	Steady	9.1	10.2	8,993	▼0.7
Green	23	1	0	0	Steady	4.5	8.6	7,545	▲1.8
TUSC	3	0	0	0	Steady	0.0	0.3	239	▼0.2
UKIP	1	0	0	0	Steady	0.0	0.1	107	▼3.6
Independent	1	0	0	0	Steady	0.0	0.1	92	▼1.1

(Note: % of total refers to % of wards won.)

=== Results by constituency ===
==== Birkenhead constituency ====
Birkenhead consists of the wards of Bidston and St James, Birkenhead and Tranmere, Claughton, Oxton, Prenton and Rock Ferry.

Wirral Metropolitan Borough Council Election Results, 2018 (Birkenhead)
Party	Candidates						Votes		
Party	Stood	Elected	Gained	Unseated	Net	% of total	%	No.	Net %
Labour	6	4	0	0	Steady	66.7	54.7	11,169	▼1.0
Green	6	1	0	0	Steady	16.7	19.2	3,916	▲6.9
Liberal Democrats	5	1	0	0	Steady	16.7	14.1	2,875	▼2.2
Conservative	6	0	0	0	Steady	0.0	11.3	2,307	▲1.0
TUSC	2	0	0	0	Steady	0.0	0.7	150	▼0.3

==== Wallasey constituency ====
Wallasey consists of the wards of Leasowe and Moreton East, Liscard, Moreton West and Saughall Massie, New Brighton, Seacombe and Wallasey.

Wirral Metropolitan Borough Council Election Results, 2018 (Wallasey)
Party	Candidates						Votes		
Party	Stood	Elected	Gained	Unseated	Net	% of total	%	No.	Net %
Labour	6	4	0	0	Steady	66.7	52.2	12,201	▼0.1
Conservative	6	2	0	0	Steady	33.3	38.1	8,898	▲3.5
Green	6	0	0	0	Steady	0.0	4.8	1,121	Steady
Liberal Democrats	6	0	0	0	Steady	0.0	4.0	934	▲1.6
UKIP	1	0	0	0	Steady	0.0	0.5	107	▼5.1
Independent	1	0	0	0	Steady	0.0	0.4	92	N/A

==== Wirral South constituency ====
Wirral South consists of the wards of Bebington, Bromborough, Clatterbridge, Eastham, and Heswall.

Wirral Metropolitan Borough Council Election Results, 2018 (Wirral South)
Party	Candidates						Votes		
Party	Stood	Elected	Gained	Unseated	Net	% of total	%	No.	Net %
Labour	5	2	0	0	Steady	40.0	40.4	8,803	▲2.9
Conservative	5	2	0	0	Steady	40.0	39.5	8,602	▲6.8
Liberal Democrats	5	1	0	0	Steady	20.0	15.7	3,418	▼2.1
Green	5	0	0	0	Steady	0.0	4.4	966	Steady

==== Wirral West constituency ====
Wirral West consists of the wards of Greasby, Frankby and Irby, Hoylake and Meols, Pensby and Thingwall, Upton, and West Kirby and Thurstaston.

Wirral Metropolitan Borough Council Election Results, 2018 (Wirral West)
Party	Candidates						Votes		
Party	Stood	Elected	Gained	Unseated	Net	% of total	%	No.	Net %
Conservative	6	4	0	0	Steady	60.0	50.0	11,315	▲6.1
Labour	6	2	0	0	Steady	40.0	35.0	7,919	▼4.0
Liberal Democrats	6	0	0	0	Steady	0.0	7.8	1,766	▼0.7
Green	6	0	0	0	Steady	0.0	6.8	1,542	▲0.6
TUSC	1	0	0	0	Steady	0.0	0.4	89	Steady

=== Changes in council composition ===
Prior to the election the composition of the council was:

↓
38	20	5	1	2
Lab	Con	LD	G	V

After the election the composition of the council was:

↓
39	21	5	1
Lab	Con	LD	G

Wirral Metropolitan Borough Council composition after the 2018 election

=== Votes summary ===
Popular vote
Labour	45.5%
Conservative	36.3%
Liberal Democrats	10.2%
Green	8.6%
Others	0.5%

=== Seats summary ===
Wards won
Labour	54.5%
Conservative	31.8%
Liberal Democrats	9.1%
Green	4.5%
Others	0.0%

=== Proportionality ===
The disproportionality of the 2018 election was 7.49 using the Gallagher Index.

Political Party	Vote Share	Seat Share	Difference	Difference²
Labour	45.46	54.55	▲9.09	82.63
Conservative	35.29	31.82	▼3.47	12.04
Liberal Democrat	10.20	9.09	▼1.11	1.23
Green	8.56	4.55	▼4.01	16.08
TUSC	0.27	0.00	▼0.27	0.07
UKIP	0.12	0.00	▼0.12	0.01
Independent	0.10	0.00	▼0.10	0.01
			TOTAL	112.07
			TOTAL /2	56.04
			$\sqrt{\frac{\text{TOTAL}}{2}}$	7.49

(Note: Seat share refers to % of wards won.)

== Parties and candidates ==
=== Contesting political parties ===
Party	Leader	Leader since	Leader's ward	Up for re-election?	Last election		This election	
Party	Leader	Leader since	Leader's ward	Up for re-election?	% of votes	Wards	Defending	Prior Composition
Labour	Phil Davies	29 March 2012	Birkenhead and Tranmere	✗	46.1%	13	12	39 / 66
Conservative	Ian Lewis	8 May 2017	Wallasey	✗	30.8%	7	7	21 / 66
Liberal Democrats	Phil Gilchrist	16 May 2013	Eastham	✗	10.9%	2	2	5 / 66
Green	Pat Cleary	22 May 2014	Birkenhead and Tranmere	✓	6.8%	0	1	1 / 66

There were in total 96 candidates (down 7 from 2016). As per 2016, both Labour and The Conservative Party contested all 23 seats up for election. The Green Party also stood 23 (up 2), the Liberal Democrats, 22 (up 3) and TUSC, 3 (down 4). UKIP stood 1 candidate (down 8) with 1 Independent also standing.

=== Policies ===
Labour Party

Wirral Labour's local election campaign was launched on 10 April 2018 at The Engineering College in Monk's Ferry with the help of the Liverpool City Region Metro Mayor, Steve Rotheram.

Wirral Labour's key priorities were to protect services; work with the police and social services to clamp down on anti-social behaviour and to work with the Metro Mayor to access funds to improve roads and highways.

Wirral Labour received criticism by its own LCF (Local Campaign Forum) for only having one target seat, the Green held ward of Birkenhead and Tranmere. Their campaign in Birkenhead included "Super Saturdays", personal attacks against the Green candidate Pat Cleary and suspected Green voting Labour members put on a list and threatened with suspension. The Greens held the seat with an increased vote share. Other targets were later added.

Conservative Party

The Wirral Conservative's key priorities were to cut spending on consultants and senior directors; abolish country park and coastal area parking charges; scrap the Wirral View newspaper and use the money to reinstate school crossing patrols; scrap plans for food waste bins and instead do more to reduce packaging and plastic waste; ban lending to other councils and scrap plans to build on the Green belt.

Liberal Democrats

The Wirral Liberal Democrat's key priorities were to focus on getting basic services right; secure grants from the government that will recognise Wirral's needs; give local people a greater say, particularly over the Wirral Growth Company; "leave nobody out", particularly in the example of health and social services; make sure money from the sale of council assets is put back into the community; better maintain the road network with more 20 mph zones to improve safety and to scrap the Wirral View.

Green Party

The Wirral Green Party's key priorities were to clamp down on waste and invest more in "key public services"; scrap the Wirral View newspaper and invest savings made in improving the environment; freeze executive pay and introduce measures to address the "obscene pay gap" between the lowest and highest paid council staff; prioritise key brownfield sites for regeneration and housing to end the threat to Wirral's Green belt; transform democratic structures to secure "a more inclusive and transparent council in contrast to the rigid closed shop operated by the Labour Party" and to prioritise investment in active travel with pedestrians, cyclists and cleaner air.

Other parties

The sole UKIP candidate, Paula Walters, was urged to withdraw her nomination by The Labour Party due to a series of "hate-filled" tweets from an account under her name that compared migrants to terrorists.

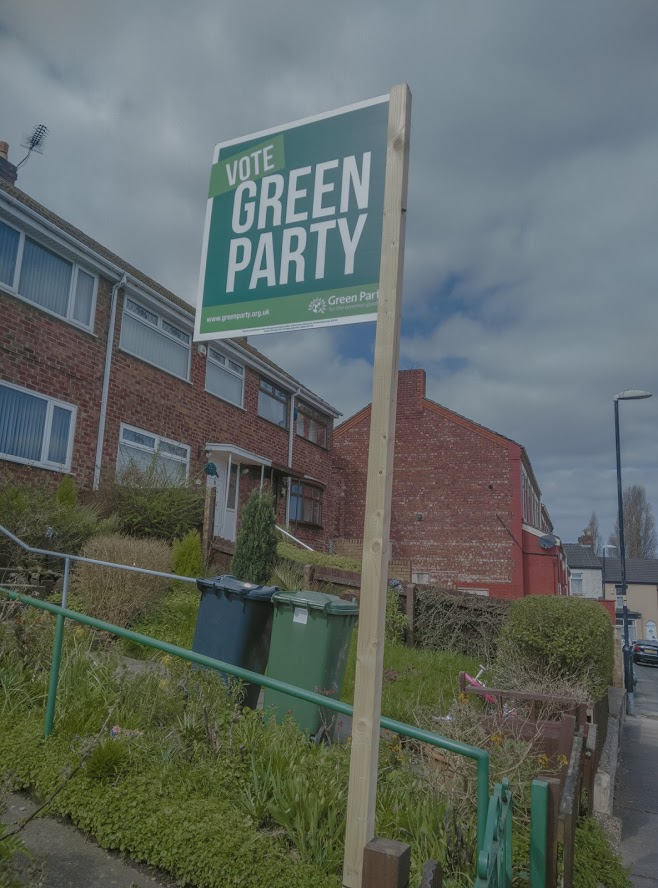
A Green stake board in Birkenhead and Tranmere

== Retiring councillors ==
Ward	Departing Councillor	Party
Bebington	Walter Smith	Labour (died on 9 November 2017)
Bidston and St James	Ann McLachlan	Labour
Clatterbridge	Tracey Pilgrim	Conservative
Hoylake and Meols	Eddie Boult	Conservative
Hoylake and Meols	John Hale	Conservative (retired on 12 March 2018)
Leasowe and Moreton East	Treena Johnson	Labour
Oxton	Alan Brighouse	Liberal Democrat
Pensby and Thingwall	Louise Reecejones	Labour
Prenton	Denise Realey	Labour

== Ward results ==
Results compared directly with the last local election in 2016.

=== Bebington ===
Bebington
Party	Candidate	Votes	%	±%
Labour	Tony Cottier	2,660	59.6	▲2.6
Conservative	Des Drury	1,355	30.3	▲8.6
Liberal Democrats	Chris Britton	235	5.3	Steady
Green	Rachel Heydon	215	4.8	▲0.5
Majority		1,305	29.3	▼6.0
Registered electors		12,086		
Turnout		4,473	37.0	▼0.1
Rejected ballots		8	0.2	▼0.5
Labour hold		Swing	▼3.0	

=== Bidston and St James ===
Bidston and St James
Party	Candidate	Votes	%	±%
Labour	Liz Grey	1,866	75.7	▲6.6
Conservative	Nick Hanna	303	12.3	▲4.6
Green	Jamie Parkhouse	119	4.8	▲0.5
Liberal Democrats	Michael Parsons	92	3.7	▲0.4
TUSC	Warwick Roberts	84	3.4	▲1.3
Majority		1,563	63.4	▲7.7
Registered electors		10,294		
Turnout		2,469	24.0	▼0.8
Rejected ballots		5	0.2	▼0.3
Labour hold		Swing	▲3.9	

=== Birkenhead and Tranmere ===
Birkenhead and Tranmere
Party	Candidate	Votes	%	±%
Green	Pat Cleary	1,881	49.7	▲7.1
Labour	Paul Jobson	1,810	47.8	▼0.1
Conservative	June Cowin	96	2.5	▲0.7
Majority		71	1.9	N/A
Registered electors		10,281		
Turnout		3,793	36.9	▲3.3
Rejected ballots		6	0.2	▼0.4
Green hold		Swing	▲3.6	

=== Bromborough ===
Bromborough
Party	Candidate	Votes	%	±%
Labour	Irene Williams	2,120	61.1	▲10.6
Conservative	Peter Taylor	768	22.1	▲9.7
Liberal Democrats	Vicky Downie	386	11.1	▲6.9
Green	Susan Braddock	198	5.7	▲2.0
Majority		1,352	39.0	▲16.1
Registered electors		11,756		
Turnout		3,483	29.6	▼2.0
Rejected ballots		11	0.3	▼0.4
Labour hold		Swing	▲8.1	

=== Clatterbridge ===
Clatterbridge
Party	Candidate	Votes	%	±%
Conservative	Mary Jordan	2,735	55.3	▲3.6
Labour	Giuseppe Roberto	1,674	33.9	▼3.1
Liberal Democrats	Colin Thompson	322	6.5	▼0.9
Green	Jim McGinley	211	4.3	▲0.4
Majority		1,061	21.4	▲6.7
Registered electors		11,528		
Turnout		4,952	43.0	▲3.4
Rejected ballots		10	0.2	▼0.4
Conservative hold		Swing	▲3.4	

=== Claughton ===
Claughton
Party	Candidate	Votes	%	±%
Labour	Gillian Wood	2,079	58.9	▼7.7
Conservative	Suzanne Downward	795	22.5	▲4.6
Liberal Democrats	David Evans	426	12.1	▲5.3
Green	Liz Heydon	231	6.5	▲0.3
Majority		1,284	36.4	▼12.3
Registered electors		11,549		
Turnout		3,541	30.7	▼0.9
Rejected ballots		10	0.3	▼0.3
Labour hold		Swing	▼6.2	

=== Eastham ===
Eastham
Party	Candidate	Votes	%	±%
Liberal Democrats	Chris Carubia	2,083	48.2	▼18.8
Labour Co-op	Jo Bird	1,561	36.1	▲12.5
Conservative	Allan Guy	564	13.0	▲5.7
Green	Percy Hogg	115	2.7	▲0.6
Majority		522	12.1	▼31.3
Registered electors		11,150		
Turnout		4,330	38.8	▲2.0
Rejected ballots		7	0.2	▼0.5
Liberal Democrats hold		Swing	▼15.7	

=== Greasby, Frankby and Irby ===
Greasby, Frankby and Irby
Party	Candidate	Votes	%	±%
Conservative	Wendy Clements	3,046	58.8	▲10.3
Labour	Katherine Stuart	1,238	23.9	▼4.9
Liberal Democrats	Andy Corkhill	717	13.8	▼3.8
Green	Cathy Page	176	3.4	▼1.8
Majority		1,808	34.9	▲15.2
Registered electors		11,500		
Turnout		5,184	45.1	▲5.3
Rejected ballots		7	0.1	▼0.5
Conservative hold		Swing	▲7.6	

=== Heswall ===
Heswall
Party	Candidate	Votes	%	±%
Conservative	Les Rowlands	3,180	69.3	▲4.3
Labour	Christine Trenery	788	17.2	▼3.1
Liberal Democrats	Robert Thompson	392	8.5	▲1.7
Green	Barbara Burton	227	4.9	▼2.9
Majority		2,392	52.1	▲7.4
Registered electors		10,950		
Turnout		4,595	42.0	▲2.0
Rejected ballots		8	0.2	▼0.4
Conservative hold		Swing	▲3.7	

=== Hoylake and Meols ===
Hoylake and Meols (2)
Party	Candidate	Votes	%	±%
Conservative	Tony Cox (Note: Elected to serve a 4-year term.)	2,441	53.9	▼0.2
Conservative	Andrew Gardner (Note: Elected to serve a 2-year term.)	2,378	52.6	▼1.5
Labour	Tony Murphy	1,346	29.7	▼0.5
Labour	Matthew Daniel	1,191	26.3	▼3.9
Green	Alix Cockcroft	526	11.6	▲2.4
Liberal Democrats	Peter Reisdorf	298	6.6	▲0.1
Green	Mark Wilde	259	5.7	▼3.5
Liberal Democrats	Alexander Clark	222	4.9	▼1.6
Majority		1,095	23.7	▼0.2
Registered electors		10,586		
Turnout		4,537	42.9	▲3.9
Rejected ballots		12	0.3	▼0.3
Conservative hold		Swing		
Conservative hold		Swing	–	

=== Leasowe and Moreton East ===
Leasowe and Moreton East
Party	Candidate	Votes	%	±%
Labour	Sharon Jones	2,067	58.6	▼10.7
Conservative	Debbie Caplin	1,185	33.6	▲9.9
Green	Michael Dixon	116	3.3	▼3.8
Independent	Mike Holt	92	2.6	New
Liberal Democrats	David Tyrrell	65	1.8	New
Majority		882	25.0	▼20.6
Registered electors		10,782		
Turnout		3,534	32.8	▲0.9
Rejected ballots		9	0.3	▼0.3
Labour hold		Swing	▼10.3	

=== Liscard ===
Liscard
Party	Candidate	Votes	%	±%
Labour	Janette Williamson	2,241	63.6	▲8.3
Conservative	Margaret Kalil	756	21.5	▲4.5
Liberal Democrats	Susan Arrowsmith	337	9.6	▲2.7
Green	Perle Sheldricks	190	5.4	▼2.9
Majority		1,485	42.1	▲3.8
Registered electors		11,091		
Turnout		3,542	31.9	▼0.9
Rejected ballots		18	0.5	▲0.2
Labour hold		Swing	▲1.9	

=== Moreton West and Saughall Massie ===
Moreton West and Saughall Massie
Party	Candidate	Votes	%	±%
Conservative	Bruce Berry	2,711	61.6	▲4.8
Labour	Bill McGenity	1,464	33.3	▼0.7
Green	Helen O'Donnell	135	3.1	▲1.1
Liberal Democrats	Amanda Crowfoot	92	2.1	New
Majority		1,247	28.3	▲5.5
Registered electors		10,688		
Turnout		4,409	41.3	▲1.9
Rejected ballots		7	0.2	▼0.2
Conservative hold		Swing	▲2.8	

=== New Brighton ===
New Brighton
Party	Candidate	Votes	%	±%
Labour	Christine Spriggs	2,402	59.1	▲7.2
Conservative	William Raybould	1,048	25.8	▼8.3
Green	Cynthia Stonall	326	8.0	▲3.4
Liberal Democrats	Adam Keenan	184	4.5	▲2.3
UKIP	Paula Walters	107	2.6	▼3.4
Majority		1,354	33.3	▲15.5
Registered electors		11,267		
Turnout		4,076	36.2	▼2.9
Rejected ballots		9	0.2	▼0.2
Labour hold		Swing	▲7.8	

=== Oxton ===
Oxton
Party	Candidate	Votes	%	±%
Liberal Democrats	Allan Brame	2,073	47.6	▼6.4
Labour	Jeff Davies	1,700	39.0	▲3.4
Conservative	Hilary Jones	376	8.6	▲2.4
Green	Moira Gommon	205	4.7	▲0.5
Majority		373	8.6	▼9.8
Registered electors		11,135		
Turnout		4,359	39.1	▼1.0
Rejected ballots		5	0.1	▼0.5
Liberal Democrats hold		Swing	▼4.9	

=== Pensby and Thingwall ===
Pensby and Thingwall
Party	Candidate	Votes	%	±%
Labour	Kate Cannon	1,878	43.9	▼4.6
Conservative	Michael Collins	1,855	43.4	▲10.1
Liberal Democrats	Lucy Johnson	298	7.0	▲0.6
Green	Allen Burton	244	5.7	▲3.0
Majority		23	0.5	▼14.7
Registered electors		10,473		
Turnout		4,282	40.9	▼3.9
Rejected ballots		7	0.2	▼0.4
Labour hold		Swing	▼7.4	

=== Prenton ===
Prenton
Party	Candidate	Votes	%	±%
Labour	Samantha Frost	1,914	49.4	▼10.9
Green	Chris Cooke	1,322	34.1	▲24.2
Conservative	Tom Bottom	470	12.1	▼7.1
Liberal Democrats	Mark Forshaw	172	4.4	▼6.2
Majority		592	15.3	▼25.8
Registered electors		10,995		
Turnout		3,891	35.4	▲3.6
Rejected ballots		19	0.5	▼0.6
Labour hold		Swing	▼12.9	

=== Rock Ferry ===
Rock Ferry
Party	Candidate	Votes	%	±%
Labour	Moira McLaughlin	1,800	74.9	▲8.2
Conservative	Sue Hemmings	267	11.1	▲2.6
Green	Sheena Hatton	158	6.6	▲0.2
Liberal Democrats	Edward Smith	112	4.7	▲1.2
TUSC	Mark Hazlehurst	66	2.7	▲1.2
Majority		1,533	63.8	▲10.4
Registered electors		10,113		
Turnout		2,409	23.8	▼1.9
Rejected ballots		6	0.2	▼0.6
Labour hold		Swing	▲5.2	

=== Seacombe ===
Seacombe
Party	Candidate	Votes	%	±%
Labour	Adrian Jones	2,003	77.1	▼8.2
Conservative	John Laing	337	13.0	▼1.7
Green	Peter Lageard	174	6.7	New
Liberal Democrats	Christopher Teggin	85	3.3	New
Majority		1,666	64.1	▼6.5
Registered electors		10,366		
Turnout		2,605	25.1	▼1.6
Rejected ballots		6	0.2	▼2.0
Labour hold		Swing	▼3.3	

=== Upton ===
Upton
Party	Candidate	Votes	%	±%
Labour	Stuart Whittingham	2,289	58.2	▼2.8
Conservative	Alison Wright	1,125	28.6	▲3.9
Green	Lily Clough	265	6.7	▼0.3
Liberal Democrats	Alan Davies	166	4.2	▼0.4
TUSC	John Murray	89	2.3	▼0.3
Majority		1,164	29.6	▼6.7
Registered electors		12,471		
Turnout		3,945	31.6	▲1.3
Rejected ballots		11	0.3	▼1.2
Labour hold		Swing	▼3.4	

=== Wallasey ===
Wallasey
Party	Candidate	Votes	%	±%
Conservative	Lesley Rennie	2,861	54.6	▲4.5
Labour	Paul Martin	2,024	38.7	▲3.6
Green	James Brady	180	3.4	▼2.0
Liberal Democrats	John Codling	171	3.3	▼1.0
Majority		837	15.9	▲0.9
Registered electors		11,823		
Turnout		5,243	44.3	▲5.7
Rejected ballots		7	0.1	▼0.3
Conservative hold		Swing	▲0.4	

=== West Kirby and Thurstaston ===
West Kirby and Thurstaston
Party	Candidate	Votes	%	±%
Conservative	Jeff Green	2,848	61.5	▲4.0
Labour	James Laing	1,168	25.2	▼3.4
Green	Yvonne McGinley	331	7.1	▼0.6
Liberal Democrats	Michael Redfern	287	6.2	Steady
Majority		1,680	36.3	▲7.4
Registered electors		10,328		
Turnout		4,642	44.9	▲4.1
Rejected ballots		8	0.2	▼0.4
Conservative hold		Swing	▲3.7	

== Changes between 2018 and 2019 ==
=== Bromborough by-election 2018 ===
Cllr Warren Ward, elected in 2016, announced his resignation on 9 July 2018. A casual vacancy was announced the next day.

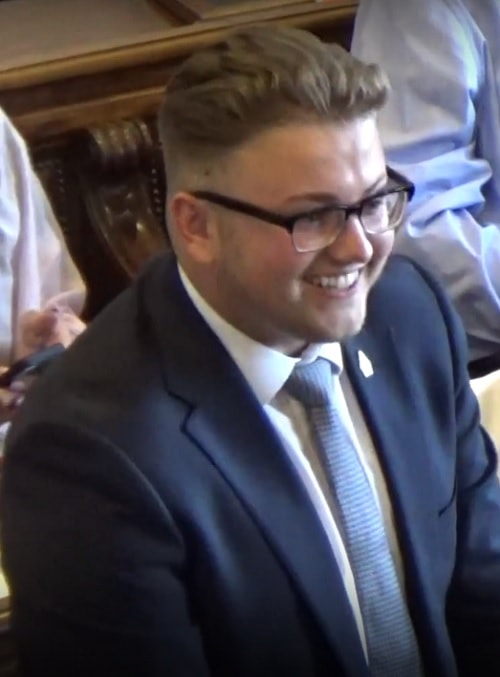
Outgoing councillor Warren Ward.

By-election, 23 August 2018: Bromborough
Party	Candidate	Votes	%	±%
Labour Co-op	Jo Bird	1,253	47.1	▼14.0
Conservative	Des Drury	749	28.1	▲6.0
Liberal Democrats	Vicky Downie	454	17.1	▲6.0
Independent	Steve Niblock	147	5.5	New
Green	Susan Braddock	59	2.2	▼3.5
Majority		504	19.0	▼20.0
Registered electors		11,760		
Turnout		2,664	22.7	▼6.9
Rejected ballots		2	0.1	▼0.2
Labour hold		Swing	▼10.0	

=== Campaign ===
On 20 July, Conservative candidate Des Drury sent a printed letter to nearly 1,200 residents about a planning application being approved for the ex-Bromborough Secondary School site that borders the south of the ward. The letter mentions a "More than 1,000" signature strong petition opposing the application. The lead petitioner, who spoke in front of the planning committee when the application was considered on 19 July, was future Labour candidate Jo Bird. This was despite the fact that all 7 Labour councillors on the committee (a majority on the committee as a whole) voted to approve the application.

=== Upton by-election 2018 ===
Cllr Matthew Patrick, first elected in 2013, announced his resignation on 21 September 2018. He formally resigned on 7 October 2018 with a casual vacancy announced the following day.

By-election, 22 November 2018: Upton
Party	Candidate	Votes	%	±%
Labour	Jean Robinson	1,490	61.3	▲3.1
Conservative	Emma Sellman	705	29.0	▲0.4
Green	Lily Clough	151	6.2	▼0.5
Liberal Democrats	Alan Davies	83	3.4	▼0.8
Majority		785	32.3	▲2.7
Registered electors		12,040		
Turnout		2,434	20.2	▼11.4
Rejected ballots		5	0.2	▼0.1
Labour hold		Swing	▲1.4	

=== Other changes ===
Date	Ward	Name	Previous affiliation	New affiliation	Circumstance
28 August 2018	Pensby and Thingwall	Mike Suillvan	Labour	Independent	Resigned.
25 October 2018	Rock Ferry	Moira McLaughlin	Labour	Independent	Resigned.
January 2019	Rock Ferry	Chris Meaden	Labour	Independent	Resigned.
4 March 2019	Bromborough	Jo Bird	Labour Co-op	Independent	Suspended.
14 March 2019	Bromborough	Jo Bird	Independent	Labour Co-op	Reinstated.
18 March 2019	Rock Ferry	Bill Davies	Labour	Independent	Resigned.
April 2019	Oxton	Paul Doughty	Labour	Independent	Suspended.

On 22 February 2019, Moira McLaughlin was announced as leader of an Independent group composed of the three Labour defections.

== Notes ==
• italics denote the sitting councillor • bold denotes the winning candidate
