= 2007 Wirral Metropolitan Borough Council election =

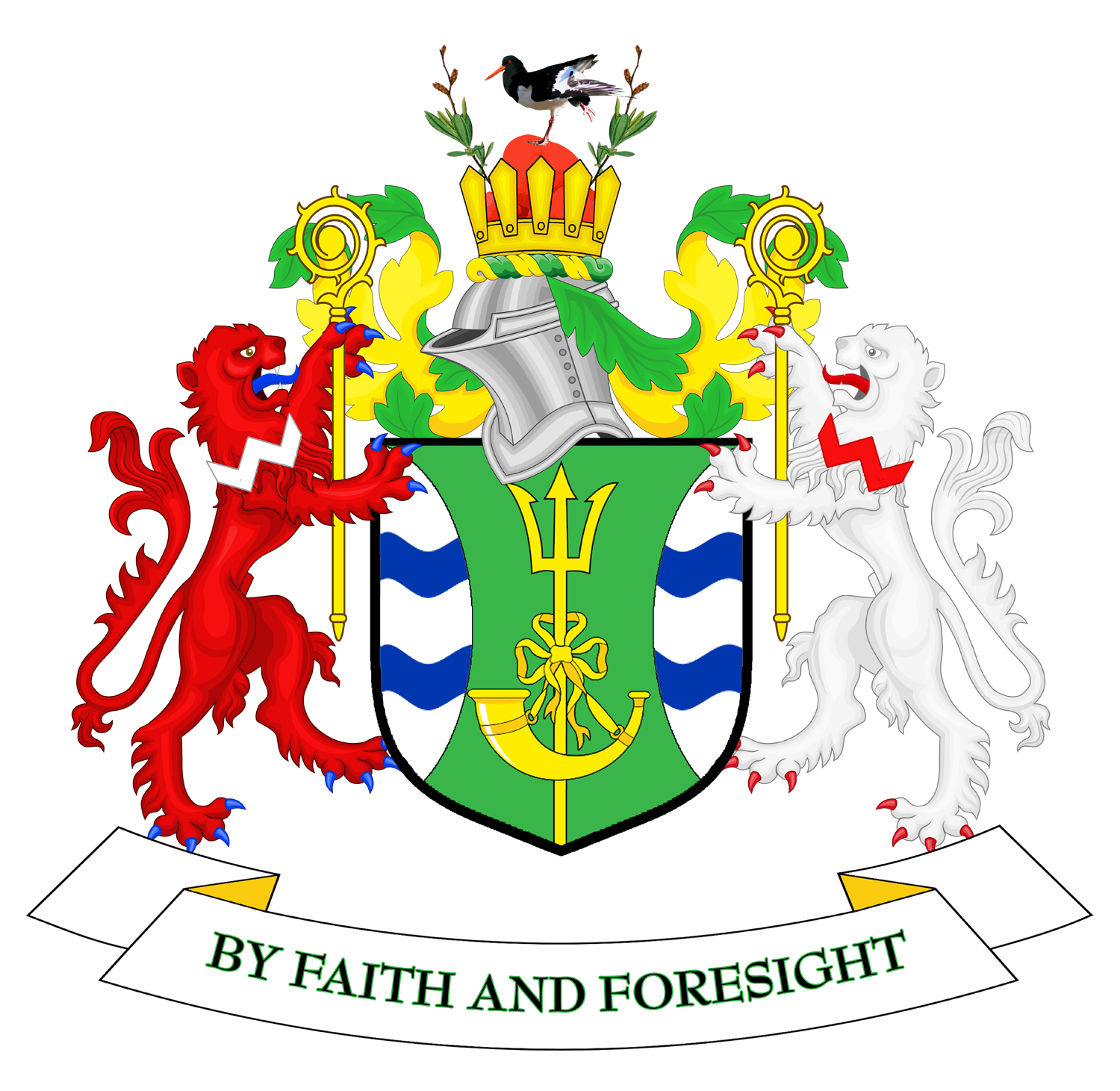
- 3 May 2007

22 of 66 seats (One Third) to Wirral Metropolitan Borough Council 34 seats needed for a majority
- Turnout: 36.1% (▲0.9%)
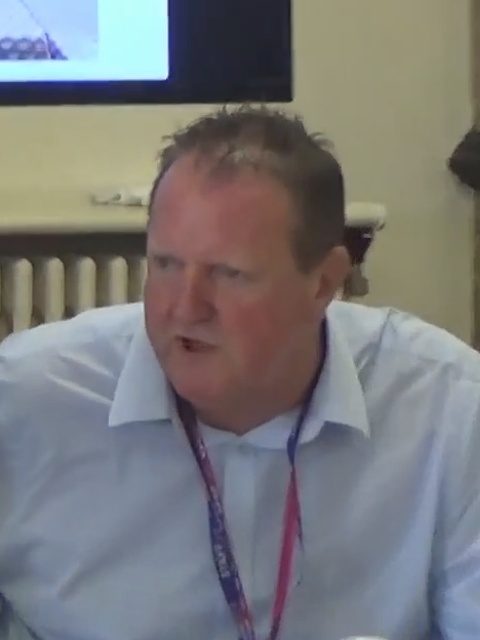

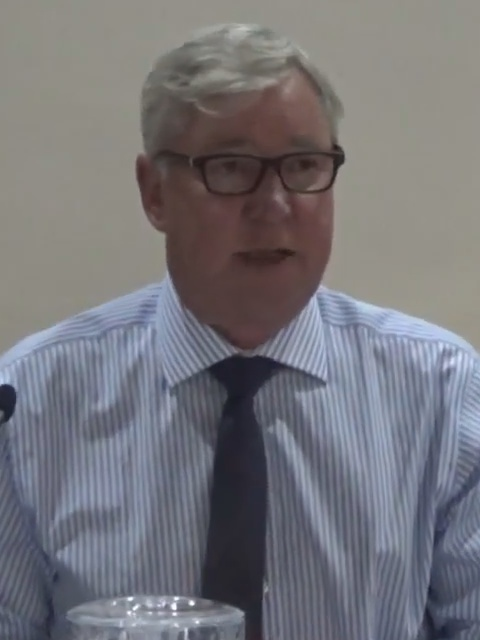

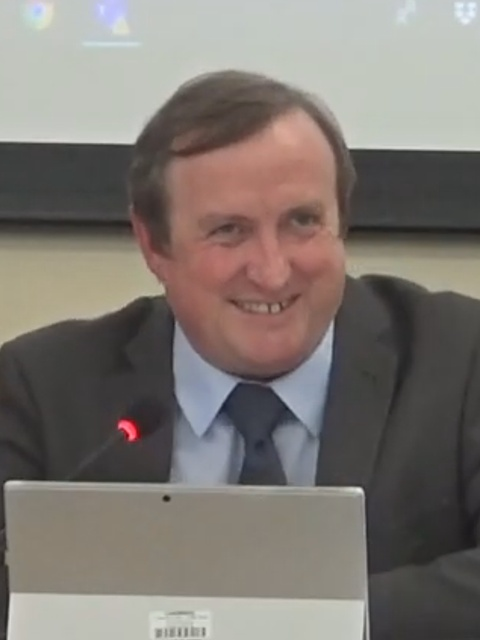
	First party	Second party	Third party
Leader	Steve Foulkes	Jeff Green	Stuart Kelly
Party	Labour	Conservative	Liberal Democrats
Leader's seat	Claughton	West Kirby and Thurstaston	Oxton
Last election	8 seats, 27.5%	7 seats, 37.3%	7 seats, 27.1%
Seats before	26	21	19
Seats won	8	7	7
Seats after	25	21	20
Seat change	▼1	Steady	▲1
Popular vote	25,399	34,081	22,289
Percentage	28.7%	38.6%	25.2%
Swing	▲1.2%	▲1.3%	▼1.9%
- Map of results of 2007 election
Leader of the Council before election
Steve Foulkes (Labour)
No Overall Control
Leader of the Council after election
Steve Foulkes (Labour)
No Overall Control

The 2007 Wirral Metropolitan Borough Council election took place on 3 May 2007 to elect members of Wirral Metropolitan Borough Council in England. This election was held on the same day as other local elections.

After the election, the composition of the council was:

Party	Seats	±
Labour	25	▼1
Conservative	21	Steady
Liberal Democrat	20	▲1

== Election results ==
=== Overall election result ===
Overall result compared with 2006.

Wirral Metropolitan Borough Council election result, 2007
Party	Candidates						Votes		
Party	Stood	Elected	Gained	Unseated	Net	% of total	%	No.	Net %
Conservative	22	7	1	1	Steady	31.8	38.6	34,081	▲1.3
Labour	22	8	0	1	▼1	36.4	28.7	25,399	▲1.2
Liberal Democrats	22	7	1	0	▲1	31.8	25.2	22,289	▼1.9
Green	22	0	0	0	Steady	0.0	5.4	4,809	▼0.9
UKIP	6	0	0	0	Steady	0.0	1.7	1,475	▲0.7
Independent	1	0	0	0	Steady	0.0	0.4	311	N/A

== Ward results ==
Results compared directly with the last local election in 2006.

=== Bebington ===
Bebington
Party	Candidate	Votes	%	±%
Labour	Jerry Williams	2,201	43.7	▲8.3
Conservative	Les Thomas	1,554	30.9	▼1.8
Liberal Democrats	Christopher Jackson	580	11.5	▼6.9
UKIP	Hilary Jones	514	10.2	▲1.1
Green	Michael Harper	187	3.7	▼0.8
Majority		647	12.8	▲10.1
Registered electors		12,020		
Turnout			41.9	▲0.7
Labour hold		Swing	▲5.1	

=== Bidston and St James ===
Bidston and St James
Party	Candidate	Votes	%	±%
Labour	Harry Smith	1,384	59.7	▼4.0
Independent	George Thomas	311	13.4	New
Conservative	Fiona Marsh	292	12.6	▼1.7
Liberal Democrats	John Brace	215	9.3	▼4.9
Green	George Bowler	116	5.0	▼2.8
Majority		1,073	46.3	▼3.1
Registered electors		10,380		
Turnout			22.4	▲1.9
Labour hold		Swing	▼1.6	

=== Birkenhead and Tranmere ===
Birkenhead and Tranmere
Party	Candidate	Votes	%	±%
Labour	Phillip Davies	1,399	62.4	▲9.2
Liberal Democrats	Alan Brighouse	333	14.9	▲0.5
Conservative	June Cowin	255	11.4	▲2.2
Green	Catherine Page	254	11.3	▲3.2
Majority		1,066	47.5	▲9.4
Registered electors		10,374		
Turnout			21.7	▲0.8
Labour hold		Swing	▲4.7	

=== Bromborough ===
Bromborough
Party	Candidate	Votes	%	±%
Liberal Democrats	Robert Moon	1,753	48.3	▼5.0
Labour	Audrey Moore	1,002	27.6	▲0.6
Conservative	Mark Gibson	684	18.8	▲4.6
Green	Joyce Hogg	192	5.3	▼0.2
Majority		751	20.7	▼5.6
Registered electors		10,953		
Turnout			33.3	▲1.3
Liberal Democrats hold		Swing	▼2.8	

=== Clatterbridge ===
Clatterbridge
Party	Candidate	Votes	%	±%
Liberal Democrats	Alan Jennings	2,401	44.7	▼0.6
Conservative	Cherry Povall	2,152	40.1	▲2.1
Labour	Ethel Morgan	643	12.0	▼1.5
Green	Jim McGinley	173	3.2	Steady
Majority		249	4.6	▼2.7
Registered electors		11,856		
Turnout			45.4	▲1.3
Liberal Democrats hold		Swing	▼1.4	

=== Claughton ===
Claughton
Party	Candidate	Votes	%	±%
Labour	Stephen Foulkes	1,784	52.0	▲2.7
Conservative	Barbara Sinclair	943	27.5	▲0.2
Liberal Democrats	Anna Blumenthal	485	14.1	▼2.4
Green	Garnette Bowler	218	6.4	▼0.5
Majority		841	24.5	▲2.5
Registered electors		11,553		
Turnout			29.8	▲1.5
Labour hold		Swing	▲1.3	

=== Eastham ===
Eastham
Party	Candidate	Votes	%	±%
Liberal Democrats	Dave Mitchell	3,067	70.3	▲1.9
Conservative	Graham Davies	661	15.2	▲0.3
Labour	Christopher Lawler	518	11.9	▼1.2
Green	Brian Gibbs	114	2.6	▼1.0
Majority		2,406	55.1	▲1.6
Registered electors		11,164		
Turnout			39.1	▲0.4
Liberal Democrats hold		Swing	▲0.8	

=== Greasby, Frankby and Irby ===
Greasby, Frankby and Irby
Party	Candidate	Votes	%	±%
Liberal Democrats	Peter Reisdorf	2,552	47.3	▼1.6
Conservative	Vida Wilson	1,846	34.2	▼2.7
Labour	Barbara Moores	553	10.3	▼0.4
UKIP	Mike Pepler	309	5.7	New
Green	Perle Sheldricks	132	2.4	▼1.1
Majority		706	13.1	▲1.1
Registered electors		11,607		
Turnout			46.2	▼1.3
Liberal Democrats hold		Swing	▲0.5	

=== Heswall ===
Heswall
Party	Candidate	Votes	%	±%
Conservative	Andrew Hodson	3,385	69.3	▼0.3
Liberal Democrats	David Evans	618	12.7	▲0.5
Labour	Philip Waterfield	589	12.1	▲1.0
Green	Anne Rosseinsky	292	6.0	▼1.1
Majority		2,767	56.6	▼0.8
Registered electors		11,136		
Turnout			44.0	▼0.5
Conservative hold		Swing	▼0.4	

=== Hoylake and Meols ===
Hoylake and Meols
Party	Candidate	Votes	%	±%
Conservative	Gerry Ellis	2,944	66.7	▲7.7
Labour	Alan Milne	665	15.1	▼2.9
Liberal Democrats	Alexander Clark	457	10.3	▼3.9
Green	Hara Willow	350	7.9	▼1.0
Majority		2,279	51.6	▲10.6
Registered electors		10,606		
Turnout			41.7	▲1.5
Conservative hold		Swing	▲5.3	

=== Leasowe and Moreton East ===
Leasowe and Moreton East
Party	Candidate	Votes	%	±%
Labour	Ron Abbey	1,682	44.3	▼1.3
Conservative	Ian Lewis	1,664	43.9	▲10.3
Liberal Democrats	Gerald Hainsworth	244	6.4	▼6.6
Green	Rosemary Bland	204	5.4	▼2.4
Majority		18	0.4	▼11.6
Registered electors		11,087		
Turnout			34.3	▲5.7
Labour hold		Swing	▼5.8	

=== Liscard ===
Liscard
Party	Candidate	Votes	%	±%
Conservative	Karen Hayes	2,116	49.7	▼0.2
Labour	Gary Leech	1,609	37.8	▲3.8
Liberal Democrats	Daniel Clein	244	5.7	▼1.3
UKIP	Phil Griffiths	149	3.5	▼0.5
Green	Rebecca Koncienzcy	143	3.4	▼1.7
Majority		507	11.9	▼4.0
Registered electors		11,418		
Turnout			37.4	▲1.0
Conservative gain from Labour		Swing	▼2.0	

=== Moreton West and Saughall Massie ===
Moreton West and Saughall Massie
Party	Candidate	Votes	%	±%
Conservative	Suzanne Moseley	2,365	60.5	▲3.5
Labour	Darren Dodd	943	24.1	▼1.6
Liberal Democrats	Eric Copestake	306	7.8	▼2.8
Green	James Drew	160	4.1	▼2.5
UKIP	Natasha Minns	136	3.5	New
Majority		1,422	36.4	▲5.1
Registered electors		11,087		
Turnout			35.3	▲0.6
Conservative hold		Swing	▲2.6	

=== New Brighton ===
New Brighton
Party	Candidate	Votes	%	±%
Conservative	Tony Pritchard	1,814	45.7	▲3.9
Labour	Anne McArdle	1,256	31.6	▼0.2
Green	Cynthia Stonall	534	13.4	▼0.7
Liberal Democrats	Nicol Hick	368	9.3	▼3.0
Majority		558	14.1	▲4.1
Registered electors		11,095		
Turnout			35.7	▲0.4
Conservative hold		Swing	▲2.1	

=== Oxton ===
Oxton
Party	Candidate	Votes	%	±%
Liberal Democrats	Stuart Kelly	2,007	54.8	▼0.6
Labour	David Barden	693	18.9	▲1.6
Conservative	Marcus Bleasdale	611	16.7	▲1.6
Green	Marilyn Jones	193	5.3	▲0.3
UKIP	Cathy Williams	158	4.3	▼2.9
Majority		1,314	35.9	▼2.2
Registered electors		11,278		
Turnout			32.6	▼0.8
Liberal Democrats hold		Swing	▼1.1	

=== Pensby and Thingwall ===
Pensby and Thingwall
Party	Candidate	Votes	%	±%
Liberal Democrats	Sarah Quinn	2,110	44.0	▲3.6
Conservative	Jacquie McKelvie	1,777	37.0	▼0.5
Labour	John Cunningham	742	15.5	▼1.0
Green	Allen Burton	170	3.5	▼2.1
Majority		333	7.0	▲4.1
Registered electors		10,743		
Turnout			44.8	▲2.2
Liberal Democrats gain from Conservative		Swing	▲2.1	

=== Prenton ===
Prenton
Party	Candidate	Votes	%	±%
Liberal Democrats	Simon Holbrook	2,148	52.3	▲10.8
Labour	Denise Realey	1,105	26.9	▼5.4
Conservative	Andrew Burns	677	16.5	▼3.5
Green	Mark Mitchell	177	4.3	▼1.9
Majority		1,043	25.4	▲16.2
Registered electors		11,141		
Turnout			36.9	▲2.7
Liberal Democrats hold		Swing	▲8.1	

=== Rock Ferry ===
Rock Ferry
Party	Candidate	Votes	%	±%
Labour	Chris Meaden	1,474	59.6	▲1.6
Conservative	Joanne Suffield	433	17.5	▲0.8
Liberal Democrats	Peter Heppinstall	342	13.8	▼2.9
Green	Peter Exley	224	9.1	▲0.5
Majority		1,041	42.1	▲0.8
Registered electors		10,292		
Turnout			24.1	▲0.3
Labour hold		Swing	▲0.4	

=== Seacombe ===
Seacombe
Party	Candidate	Votes	%	±%
Labour	Denis Knowles	1,447	59.5	▲1.3
Conservative	Bernie Howden	527	21.7	▲3.8
Liberal Democrats	Steve Pitt	299	12.3	▼2.6
Green	Beverley Kells	160	6.6	▼2.3
Majority		920	37.8	▼2.5
Registered electors		10,614		
Turnout			23.0	▲0.8
Labour hold		Swing	▼1.3	

=== Upton ===
Upton
Party	Candidate	Votes	%	±%
Labour	Tony Smith	1,931	43.1	▲4.0
Conservative	Julie Kirwan	1,734	38.7	▲6.3
Liberal Democrats	Christopher Beazer	575	12.8	▼9.8
Green	Marian Hussenbux	244	5.4	▼0.6
Majority		197	4.4	▼2.3
Registered electors		12,311		
Turnout			36.4	▲0.2
Labour hold		Swing	▼1.2	

=== Wallasey ===
Wallasey
Party	Candidate	Votes	%	±%
Conservative	Paul Hayes	2,801	58.3	▼0.8
Labour	Christine Jones	1,138	23.7	▲4.2
Liberal Democrats	John Uriel	466	9.7	▼1.4
UKIP	Ian Watson	209	4.4	New
Green	Percy Hogg	189	3.9	▼0.7
Majority		1,663	34.6	▼5.0
Registered electors		11,979		
Turnout			40.1	▼1.0
Conservative hold		Swing	▼2.5	

=== West Kirby and Thurstaston ===
West Kirby and Thurstaston
Party	Candidate	Votes	%	±%
Conservative	David Elderton	2,846	62.0	▼0.4
Liberal Democrats	John Cresswell	719	15.7	▼0.4
Labour	James Brown	641	14.0	▲0.7
Green	Patrick Cleary	383	8.3	▲0.1
Majority		2,127	46.3	Steady
Registered electors		10,493		
Turnout			43.9	▲1.0
Conservative hold		Swing	Steady	

== Changes between 2007 and 2008 ==
Date	Ward	Name	Previous affiliation	New affiliation	Circumstance
May 2007	Clatterbridge	Isabel Moon	Liberal Democrats	Ind. Lib Dem	Resigned.
June 2007	Hoylake and Meols	David Kirwan	Conservative	Ind. Conservative	Resigned.

== Notes ==
• italics denote the sitting councillor • bold denotes the winning candidate
