= Oxton (ward) =

Local council ward in Wirral, England

Oxton within Wirral

Oxton (previously Grange and Oxton, 1973 to 1979) is a Wirral Metropolitan Borough Council ward in the Birkenhead Parliamentary constituency.

== Councillors ==
Council	Wirral Metropolitan Borough Council				Merseyside County Council		
Election	Councillor (Party)	Councillor (Party)	Councillor (Party)	Ref.	Election	Councillor (Party)	Ref.
1973	Gordon Lindsay (Liberal /Alliance /Liberal Democrats)	A. Halliday (Liberal)	Truffet (Liberal)		1973	Gordon Lindsay (Liberal)	
1975	Gordon Lindsay (Liberal /Alliance /Liberal Democrats)	A. Halliday (Liberal)	R. Hodkinson (Conservative)		1973	Gordon Lindsay (Liberal)	
1976	Gordon Lindsay (Liberal /Alliance /Liberal Democrats)	M. Hesketh (Conservative)	R. Hodkinson (Conservative)		1973	Gordon Lindsay (Liberal)	
1976	Gordon Lindsay (Liberal /Alliance /Liberal Democrats)	M. Hesketh (Conservative)	R. Hodkinson (Conservative)		1977	F. Morton (Conservative)	
1978	Gordon Lindsay (Liberal /Alliance /Liberal Democrats)	M. Hesketh (Conservative)	R. Hodkinson (Conservative)		1977	F. Morton (Conservative)	
1979	Gordon Lindsay (Liberal /Alliance /Liberal Democrats)	Mike Cooke (Liberal /Alliance /Liberal Democrats)	A. Halliday (Liberal /Alliance)		1977	F. Morton (Conservative)	
1980	Gordon Lindsay (Liberal /Alliance /Liberal Democrats)	Mike Cooke (Liberal /Alliance /Liberal Democrats)	A. Halliday (Liberal /Alliance)		1977	F. Morton (Conservative)	
1980	Gordon Lindsay (Liberal /Alliance /Liberal Democrats)	Mike Cooke (Liberal /Alliance /Liberal Democrats)	A. Halliday (Liberal /Alliance)		1981	Allan Brame (Liberal /Alliance)	
1982	Gordon Lindsay (Liberal /Alliance /Liberal Democrats)	Mike Cooke (Liberal /Alliance /Liberal Democrats)	A. Halliday (Liberal /Alliance)		1981	Allan Brame (Liberal /Alliance)	
1983	Gordon Lindsay (Liberal /Alliance /Liberal Democrats)	Mike Cooke (Liberal /Alliance /Liberal Democrats)	L. Egdell (Alliance)		1981	Allan Brame (Liberal /Alliance)	
1984	Gordon Lindsay (Liberal /Alliance /Liberal Democrats)	Mike Cooke (Liberal /Alliance /Liberal Democrats)	L. Egdell (Alliance)		1981	Allan Brame (Liberal /Alliance)	
1984	Gordon Lindsay (Liberal /Alliance /Liberal Democrats)	Mike Cooke (Liberal /Alliance /Liberal Democrats)	L. Egdell (Alliance)		Council abolished 1986–present		
1986	Gordon Lindsay (Liberal /Alliance /Liberal Democrats)	Mike Cooke (Liberal /Alliance /Liberal Democrats)	L. Egdell (Alliance)		Council abolished 1986–present		
1987	Gordon Lindsay (Liberal /Alliance /Liberal Democrats)	Mike Cooke (Liberal /Alliance /Liberal Democrats)	Pat Williams (Alliance /Liberal Democrats)		Council abolished 1986–present		
1988	Gordon Lindsay (Liberal /Alliance /Liberal Democrats)	Mike Cooke (Liberal /Alliance /Liberal Democrats)	Pat Williams (Alliance /Liberal Democrats)		Council abolished 1986–present		
1990	Gordon Lindsay (Liberal /Alliance /Liberal Democrats)	Mike Cooke (Liberal /Alliance /Liberal Democrats)	Pat Williams (Alliance /Liberal Democrats)		Council abolished 1986–present		
1991	Gordon Lindsay (Liberal /Alliance /Liberal Democrats)	Mike Cooke (Liberal /Alliance /Liberal Democrats)	Pat Williams (Alliance /Liberal Democrats)		Council abolished 1986–present		
1992	Gordon Lindsay (Liberal /Alliance /Liberal Democrats)	Alec Dunn (Liberal Democrats)	Pat Williams (Alliance /Liberal Democrats)		Council abolished 1986–present		
1994	Gordon Lindsay (Liberal /Alliance /Liberal Democrats)	Alec Dunn (Liberal Democrats)	Pat Williams (Alliance /Liberal Democrats)		Council abolished 1986–present		
1995	Gordon Lindsay (Liberal /Alliance /Liberal Democrats)	Alec Dunn (Liberal Democrats)	Pat Williams (Alliance /Liberal Democrats)		Council abolished 1986–present		
1996	Gordon Lindsay (Liberal /Alliance /Liberal Democrats)	Alec Dunn (Liberal Democrats)	Pat Williams (Alliance /Liberal Democrats)		Council abolished 1986–present		
1998	Stuart Kelly (Liberal Democrats)	Freda Anderson (Liberal Democrats)	Pat Williams (Alliance /Liberal Democrats)		Council abolished 1986–present		
1999	Stuart Kelly (Liberal Democrats)	Freda Anderson (Liberal Democrats)	Pat Williams (Alliance /Liberal Democrats)		Council abolished 1986–present		
2000	Stuart Kelly (Liberal Democrats)	Freda Anderson (Liberal Democrats)	Pat Williams (Alliance /Liberal Democrats)		Council abolished 1986–present		
2002	Stuart Kelly (Liberal Democrats)	Freda Anderson (Liberal Democrats)	Pat Williams (Alliance /Liberal Democrats)		Council abolished 1986–present		
2003	Stuart Kelly (Liberal Democrats)	Freda Anderson (Liberal Democrats)	Pat Williams (Alliance /Liberal Democrats)		Council abolished 1986–present		
2004	Stuart Kelly (Liberal Democrats)	Freda Anderson (Liberal Democrats)	Pat Williams (Alliance /Liberal Democrats)		Council abolished 1986–present		
2006	Stuart Kelly (Liberal Democrats)	Paula Southwood (Liberal Democrats)	Pat Williams (Alliance /Liberal Democrats)		Council abolished 1986–present		
2007	Stuart Kelly (Liberal Democrats)	Paula Southwood (Liberal Democrats)	Pat Williams (Alliance /Liberal Democrats)		Council abolished 1986–present		
2008	Stuart Kelly (Liberal Democrats)	Paula Southwood (Liberal Democrats)	Pat Williams (Alliance /Liberal Democrats)		Council abolished 1986–present		
2010	Stuart Kelly (Liberal Democrats)	Alan Brighouse (Liberal Democrats)	Pat Williams (Alliance /Liberal Democrats)		Council abolished 1986–present		
2011	Stuart Kelly (Liberal Democrats)	Alan Brighouse (Liberal Democrats)	Pat Williams (Alliance /Liberal Democrats)		Council abolished 1986–present		
2012	Stuart Kelly (Liberal Democrats)	Alan Brighouse (Liberal Democrats)	Pat Williams (Alliance /Liberal Democrats)		Council abolished 1986–present		
2014	Stuart Kelly (Liberal Democrats)	Alan Brighouse (Liberal Democrats)	Pat Williams (Alliance /Liberal Democrats)		Council abolished 1986–present		
2015	Paul Doughty (Labour /Independent)	Alan Brighouse (Liberal Democrats)	Pat Williams (Alliance /Liberal Democrats)		Council abolished 1986–present		
2016	Paul Doughty (Labour /Independent)	Alan Brighouse (Liberal Democrats)	Stuart Kelly (Liberal Democrats)		Council abolished 1986–present		
2018	Paul Doughty (Labour /Independent)	Allan Brame (Liberal Democrats)	Stuart Kelly (Liberal Democrats)		Council abolished 1986–present		
2019	Andy Corkhill (Liberal Democrats)	Allan Brame (Liberal Democrats)	Stuart Kelly (Liberal Democrats)		Council abolished 1986–present		
2021	Andy Corkhill (Liberal Democrats)	Allan Brame (Liberal Democrats)	Stuart Kelly (Liberal Democrats)		Council abolished 1986–present		
2021 by-election	Orod Osanlou (Liberal Democrats)	Allan Brame (Liberal Democrats)	Stuart Kelly (Liberal Democrats)		Council abolished 1986–present		
2022	Orod Osanlou (Liberal Democrats)	Allan Brame (Liberal Democrats)	Stuart Kelly (Liberal Democrats)		Council abolished 1986–present		

== Election results (2004 to present) ==
=== Elections of the 2020s ===
==== November 2021 ====
By-election, 25 November 2021: Oxton
Party	Candidate	Votes	%	±%
Liberal Democrats	Orod Osanlou	1,666	68.3	▲11.3
Labour Co-op	Sue Mahoney	460	18.8	▼7.1
Conservative	Philip Merry	168	6.9	▼1.2
Green	Mary Heydon	147	6.0	▼1.5
Majority		1,206	49.4	▲18.3
Registered electors		10,795		
Turnout		22.7	2,447	▼14.5
Rejected ballots		6	0.2	▼0.9
Liberal Democrats hold		Swing	▲9.2	

==== May 2021 ====
Wirral Metropolitan Borough Council election, 6 May 2021: Oxton
Party	Candidate	Votes	%	±%
Liberal Democrats	Stuart Kelly	2,311	57.0	▼2.8
Labour	Paul Jobson	1,050	25.9	▼3.7
Conservative	Phil Merry	328	8.1	▲3.1
Green	Judith Grier	306	7.5	New
Reform	Philip Griffiths	58	1.4	New
Majority		1,261	31.1	▲0.8
Registered electors		11,020		
Turnout		37.2	4,097	▼3.0
Rejected ballots		44	1.1	▲0.8
Liberal Democrats hold		Swing	▲0.5	

=== Elections of the 2010s ===
==== May 2019 ====
Wirral Metropolitan Borough Council election, 2 May 2019: Oxton
Party	Candidate	Votes	%	±%
Liberal Democrats	Andy Corkhill	2,627	59.8	▲12.2
Labour	Jeff Davies	1,298	29.6	▼9.4
UKIP	Chris Bunker	245	5.6	New
Conservative	Tina McDonnell	220	5.0	▼3.6
Majority		1,329	30.3	▲21.7
Registered electors		10,950		
Turnout		4,405	40.2	▲1.1
Rejected ballots		15	0.3	▲0.2
Liberal Democrats gain from Independent		Swing	▲10.8	

==== May 2018 ====
Wirral Metropolitan Borough Council election, 3 May 2018: Oxton
Party	Candidate	Votes	%	±%
Liberal Democrats	Allan Brame	2,073	47.6	▼6.4
Labour	Jeff Davies	1,700	39.0	▲3.4
Conservative	Hilary Jones	376	8.6	▲2.4
Green	Moira Gommon	205	4.7	▲0.5
Majority		373	8.6	▼9.8
Registered electors		11,135		
Turnout		4,359	39.1	▼1.0
Rejected ballots		5	0.1	▼0.5
Liberal Democrats hold		Swing	▼4.9	

==== May 2016 ====
Wirral Metropolitan Borough Council election, 5 May 2016: Oxton
Party	Candidate	Votes	%	±%
Liberal Democrats	Stuart Kelly	2,381	54.0	▲18.1
Labour	Vicky Nowak	1,568	35.6	▼4.1
Conservative	Philip Merry	275	6.2	▼4.8
Green	Liz Heydon	183	4.2	▼1.3
Majority		813	18.4	N/A
Registered electors		11,044		
Turnout		4,434	40.1	▼29.3
Rejected ballots		27	0.6	
Liberal Democrats hold		Swing	▲11.1	

==== May 2015 ====
Wirral Metropolitan Borough Council election, 7 May 2015: Oxton
Party	Candidate	Votes	%	±%
Labour	Paul Doughty	3,085	39.7	▲4.6
Liberal Democrats	Stuart Kelly	2,788	35.9	▼2.4
Conservative	Hilary Jones	854	11.0	▲3.7
UKIP	David Martin	615	7.9	▼5.4
Green	Liz Heydon	424	5.5	▼0.4
Majority		297	3.8	N/A
Registered electors		11,236		
Turnout			69.4	▲31.9
Labour gain from Liberal Democrats		Swing	▲3.5	

==== May 2014 ====
Wirral Metropolitan Borough Council election, 22 May 2014: Oxton
Party	Candidate	Votes	%	±%
Liberal Democrats	Alan Brighouse	1,620	38.3	▼7.5
Labour	Angela Davies (Note: Councillor for Prenton, 2015 to 2019.)	1,483	35.1	▼4.7
UKIP	David Martin	563	13.3	▲7.5
Conservative	Peter Hartley	310	7.3	▲2.1
Green	Liz Heydon	250	5.9	▲2.5
Majority		137	3.2	▼2.8
Registered electors		11,281		
Turnout			37.5	▼2.4
Liberal Democrats hold		Swing	▼1.4	

==== May 2012 ====
Wirral Metropolitan Borough Council election, 3 May 2012: Oxton
Party	Candidate	Votes	%	±%
Liberal Democrats	Pat Williams	2,026	45.8	▲6.0
Labour	Matthew Patrick (Note: Councillor for Upton, 2013 to 2018.)	1,763	39.8	▲2.6
UKIP	Philip Grittiths	258	5.8	▲0.9
Conservative	Tina McDonnell	232	5.2	▼8.4
Green	Elisabeth Heydon	149	3.4	▼1.2
Majority		263	6.0	▲3.4
Registered electors		11,140		
Turnout			39.9	▼3.7
Liberal Democrats hold		Swing	▲1.7	

==== May 2011 ====
Wirral Metropolitan Borough Council election, 5 May 2011: Oxton
Party	Candidate	Votes	%	±%
Liberal Democrats	Stuart Kelly	1,918	39.8	▼0.7
Labour	Matthew Patrick	1,792	37.2	▲5.4
Conservative	Tina McDonnell	655	13.6	▼6.0
UKIP	Catherine Williams	234	4.9	▲0.7
Green	Garnette Bowler	222	4.6	▲0.8
Majority		126	2.6	▼6.1
Registered electors		11,108		
Turnout			43.6	▼21.5
Liberal Democrats hold		Swing	▼3.1	

==== May 2010 ====
Wirral Metropolitan Borough Council election, 6 May 2010: Oxton
Party	Candidate	Votes	%	±%
Liberal Democrats	Alan Brighouse	2,941	40.5	▼12.7
Labour	David Barden	2,310	31.8	▲14.7
Conservative	Tina McDonnell	1,425	19.6	▲1.2
UKIP	Catherine Williams	301	4.2	▼0.8
Green	Garnette Bowler	276	3.8	▼0.1
Majority		631	8.7	▼23.7
Registered electors		11,237		
Turnout			65.1	▲32.7
Liberal Democrats hold		Swing	▼11.9	

=== Elections of the 2000s ===
==== May 2008 ====
Wirral Metropolitan Borough Council election, 1 May 2008: Oxton
Party	Candidate	Votes	%	±%
Liberal Democrats	Pat Williams	1,910	53.2	▼1.6
Conservative	Marcus Bleasdale	748	20.8	▲4.1
Labour	David Barden	614	17.1	▼1.8
UKIP	Cathy Williams	179	5.0	▲0.7
Green	Garnette Bowler	139	3.9	▼1.4
Majority		1,162	32.4	▼3.5
Registered electors		11,141		
Turnout			32.4	▼0.2
Liberal Democrats hold		Swing	▼1.8	

==== May 2007 ====
Wirral Metropolitan Borough Council election, 3 May 2007: Oxton
Party	Candidate	Votes	%	±%
Liberal Democrats	Stuart Kelly	2,007	54.8	▼0.6
Labour	David Barden	693	18.9	▲1.6
Conservative	Marcus Bleasdale	611	16.7	▲1.6
Green	Marilyn Jones	193	5.3	▲0.3
UKIP	Cathy Williams	158	4.3	▼2.9
Majority		1,314	35.9	▼2.2
Registered electors		11,278		
Turnout			32.6	▼0.8
Liberal Democrats hold		Swing	▼1.1	

==== May 2006 ====
Wirral Metropolitan Borough Council election, 4 May 2006: Oxton
Party	Candidate	Votes	%	±%
Liberal Democrats	Paula Southwood	2,067	55.4	▼3.2
Labour	David Barden	646	17.3	▼0.5
Conservative	Tina McDonnell	565	15.1	▲0.1
UKIP	Michael Pepler	267	7.2	New
Green	Garnette Bowler	185	5.0	▼3.7
Majority		1,421	38.1	▼2.7
Registered electors		11,190		
Turnout			33.4	▼4.8
Liberal Democrats hold		Swing	▼1.4	

==== June 2004 ====
Wirral Metropolitan Borough Council election, 10 June 2004: Oxton
Party	Candidate	Votes	%	±%
Liberal Democrats	Patricia Williams (Note: Elected to serve a 4-year term.)	3,295	58.6	N/A
Liberal Democrats	Stuart Kelly (Note: Elected to serve a 3-year term.)	3,074	–	–
Liberal Democrats	Freda Anderson (Note: Elected to serve a 2-year term.)	2,924	–	–
Labour	David Barden	999	17.8	N/A
Labour	Michael Eastwood	997	–	–
Labour	John Mitchell	985	–	–
Conservative	Leonard Moore	843	15.0	N/A
Conservative	Barbara Evans	663	–	–
Conservative	June Cowan	661	–	–
Green	Garnette Bowler	489	8.7	N/A
Majority		2,296	40.8	N/A
Registered electors		11,269		
Turnout			42.7	N/A
Liberal Democrats win (new seat)				
Liberal Democrats win (new seat)				
Liberal Democrats win (new seat)				

== Notes ==
• italics denotes the sitting councillor • bold denotes the winning candidate
