= Upton (Wirral ward) =

Electoral ward of Wirral, Merseyside, England

Upton is a Wirral Metropolitan Borough Council ward in the Wirral West Parliamentary constituency.

== Councillors ==
Election	Councillor (Party)	Councillor (Party)	Councillor (Party)	Ref.
1973	S. Hibbert (Conservative)	Lowe (Conservative)	J. Roberts (Conservative)	
1975	S. Hibbert (Conservative)	Lowe (Conservative)	J. Roberts (Conservative)	
1976	S. Hibbert (Conservative)	M. Winter (Conservative)	J. Roberts (Conservative)	
1978	S. Hibbert (Conservative)	M. Winter (Conservative)	J. Roberts (Conservative)	
1979	S. Hibbert (Conservative)	M. Winter (Conservative)	Peter Corcoran (Labour)	
1980	S. Hibbert (Conservative)	Keith Rimmer (Labour)	Peter Corcoran (Labour)	
1982	Colin Penfold (Labour)	Keith Rimmer (Labour)	Peter Corcoran (Labour)	
1983	Colin Penfold (Labour)	Keith Rimmer (Labour)	Peter Corcoran (Labour)	
1984	Colin Penfold (Labour)	Keith Rimmer (Labour)	Peter Corcoran (Labour)	
1986	Hugh Lloyd (Labour)	Keith Rimmer (Labour)	Peter Corcoran (Labour)	
1987	Hugh Lloyd (Labour)	Keith Rimmer (Labour)	Peter Corcoran (Labour)	
1988	Hugh Lloyd (Labour)	Keith Rimmer (Labour)	Peter Corcoran (Labour)	
1990	Hugh Lloyd (Labour)	Keith Rimmer (Labour)	Peter Corcoran (Labour)	
1991	Hugh Lloyd (Labour)	Keith Rimmer (Labour)	Peter Corcoran (Labour)	
1992	Hugh Lloyd (Labour)	L. Turnball (Conservative)	Peter Corcoran (Labour)	
1994	Hugh Lloyd (Labour)	L. Turnball (Conservative)	Peter Corcoran (Labour)	
1995	Hugh Lloyd (Labour)	L. Turnball (Conservative)	Peter Corcoran (Labour)	
1996	Hugh Lloyd (Labour)	A. Bell (Labour)	Peter Corcoran (Labour)	
1998	Hugh Lloyd (Labour)	A. Bell (Labour)	Peter Corcoran (Labour)	
1999	Hugh Lloyd (Labour)	A. Bell (Labour)	Peter Corcoran (Labour)	
2000	Hugh Lloyd (Labour)	Sue Brown (Labour)	Peter Corcoran (Labour)	
2002	John George (Labour)	Sue Brown (Labour)	Peter Corcoran (Labour)	
2003	John George (Labour)	Sue Brown (Labour)	Peter Corcoran (Labour)	
2004	John George (Labour)	Sue Brown (Labour)	Tony Smith (Labour)	
2006	John George (Labour)	Sue Brown (Labour)	Tony Smith (Labour)	
2007	John George (Labour)	Sue Brown (Labour)	Tony Smith (Labour)	
2008	John George (Labour)	Tom Anderson (Conservative)	Tony Smith (Labour)	
2010	Stuart Whittingham (Labour)	Tom Anderson (Conservative)	Tony Smith (Labour)	
2011	Stuart Whittingham (Labour)	Tom Anderson (Conservative)	Tony Smith (Labour)	
2012	Stuart Whittingham (Labour)	Sylvia Hodrien (Labour)	Tony Smith (Labour)	
2013 by-election	Stuart Whittingham (Labour)	Matthew Patrick (Labour)	Tony Smith (Labour)	
2014	Stuart Whittingham (Labour)	Matthew Patrick (Labour)	Tony Smith (Labour)	
2015	Stuart Whittingham (Labour)	Matthew Patrick (Labour)	Tony Smith (Labour)	
2016	Stuart Whittingham (Labour)	Matthew Patrick (Labour)	Tony Smith (Labour)	
2018	Stuart Whittingham (Labour)	Matthew Patrick (Labour)	Tony Smith (Labour)	
2018 by-election	Stuart Whittingham (Labour)	Jean Robinson (Labour)	Tony Smith (Labour)	
2019	Stuart Whittingham (Labour)	Jean Robinson (Labour)	Tony Smith (Labour)	
2021	Stuart Whittingham (Labour)	Jean Robinson (Labour)	Tony Smith (Labour)	
2022	Stephen Bennett (Labour)	Jean Robinson (Labour)	Tony Smith (Labour)	
