= Heswall (ward) =

Ward of Wirral, Merseyside, UK

Heswall (previously Barnston-Gayton-Heswall-Oldfield; 1973 to 1979) is a Wirral Metropolitan Borough Council ward in the Wirral South Parliamentary constituency in England.

== Councillors ==
Election	Councillor (Party)	Councillor (Party)	Councillor (Party)	Ref.
1973	Harding (Conservative)	Clarke (Conservative)	Crowe (Conservative)	
1975	Harding (Conservative)	Clarke (Conservative)	V. Robertson (Conservative)	
1976	M. Gates (Conservative)	A. Maddox (Conservative)	V. Robertson (Conservative)	
1978	P. Wilson (Conservative)	A. Maddox (Conservative)	V. Robertson (Conservative)	
1979	P. Wilson (Conservative)	A. Maddox (Conservative)	V. Robertson (Conservative)	
1980	P. Wilson (Conservative)	A. Maddox (Conservative)	V. Robertson (Conservative)	
1982	P. Wilson (Conservative)	A. Maddox (Conservative)	V. Robertson (Conservative)	
1983	P. Wilson (Conservative)	A. Maddox (Conservative)	V. Robertson (Conservative)	
1984	P. Wilson (Conservative)	M. Banks (Conservative)	V. Robertson (Conservative)	
1986	T. Price (Conservative)	M. Banks (Conservative)	V. Robertson (Conservative)	
1987	T. Price (Conservative)	M. Banks (Conservative)	V. Robertson (Conservative)	
1988	T. Price (Conservative)	M. Banks (Conservative)	V. Robertson (Conservative)	
1990	T. Price (Conservative)	Ian MacKenzie (Conservative)	V. Robertson (Conservative)	
1991	T. Price (Conservative)	Ian MacKenzie (Conservative)	Peter Johnson (Conservative)	
1992	T. Price (Conservative)	Ian MacKenzie (Conservative)	Peter Johnson (Conservative)	
1994	T. Price (Conservative)	Andrew Hodson (Conservative)	Peter Johnson (Conservative)	
1995	T. Price (Conservative)	Andrew Hodson (Conservative)	Peter Johnson (Conservative)	
1996	T. Price (Conservative)	Andrew Hodson (Conservative)	Peter Johnson (Conservative)	
1998	Les Rowlands (Conservative)	Andrew Hodson (Conservative)	Peter Johnson (Conservative)	
1999	Les Rowlands (Conservative)	Andrew Hodson (Conservative)	Peter Johnson (Conservative)	
2000	Les Rowlands (Conservative)	Andrew Hodson (Conservative)	Peter Johnson (Conservative)	
2002	Les Rowlands (Conservative)	Andrew Hodson (Conservative)	Peter Johnson (Conservative)	
2003	Les Rowlands (Conservative)	Andrew Hodson (Conservative)	Peter Johnson (Conservative)	
2004	Les Rowlands (Conservative)	Andrew Hodson (Conservative)	Peter Johnson (Conservative)	
2006	Les Rowlands (Conservative)	Andrew Hodson (Conservative)	Peter Johnson (Conservative)	
2007	Les Rowlands (Conservative)	Andrew Hodson (Conservative)	Peter Johnson (Conservative)	
2008	Les Rowlands (Conservative)	Andrew Hodson (Conservative)	Peter Johnson (Conservative)	
2010	Les Rowlands (Conservative)	Andrew Hodson (Conservative)	Peter Johnson (Conservative)	
2011	Les Rowlands (Conservative)	Andrew Hodson (Conservative)	Peter Johnson (Conservative)	
2012	Les Rowlands (Conservative)	Andrew Hodson (Conservative)	Peter Johnson (Conservative)	
2013 by-election	Les Rowlands (Conservative)	Andrew Hodson (Conservative)	Kathy Hodson (Conservative)	
2014	Les Rowlands (Conservative)	Andrew Hodson (Conservative)	Kathy Hodson (Conservative)	
2015	Les Rowlands (Conservative)	Andrew Hodson (Conservative)	Kathy Hodson (Conservative)	
2016	Les Rowlands (Conservative)	Andrew Hodson (Conservative)	Kathy Hodson (Conservative)	
2018	Les Rowlands (Conservative)	Andrew Hodson (Conservative)	Kathy Hodson (Conservative)	
2019	Les Rowlands (Conservative)	Andrew Hodson (Conservative)	Kathy Hodson (Conservative)	
2021	Les Rowlands (Conservative)	Andrew Hodson (Conservative)	Kathy Hodson (Conservative)	
2021	Paul Connolly (Conservative)	Andrew Hodson (Conservative)	Kathy Hodson (Conservative)	
