= 2014 Wirral Metropolitan Borough Council election =

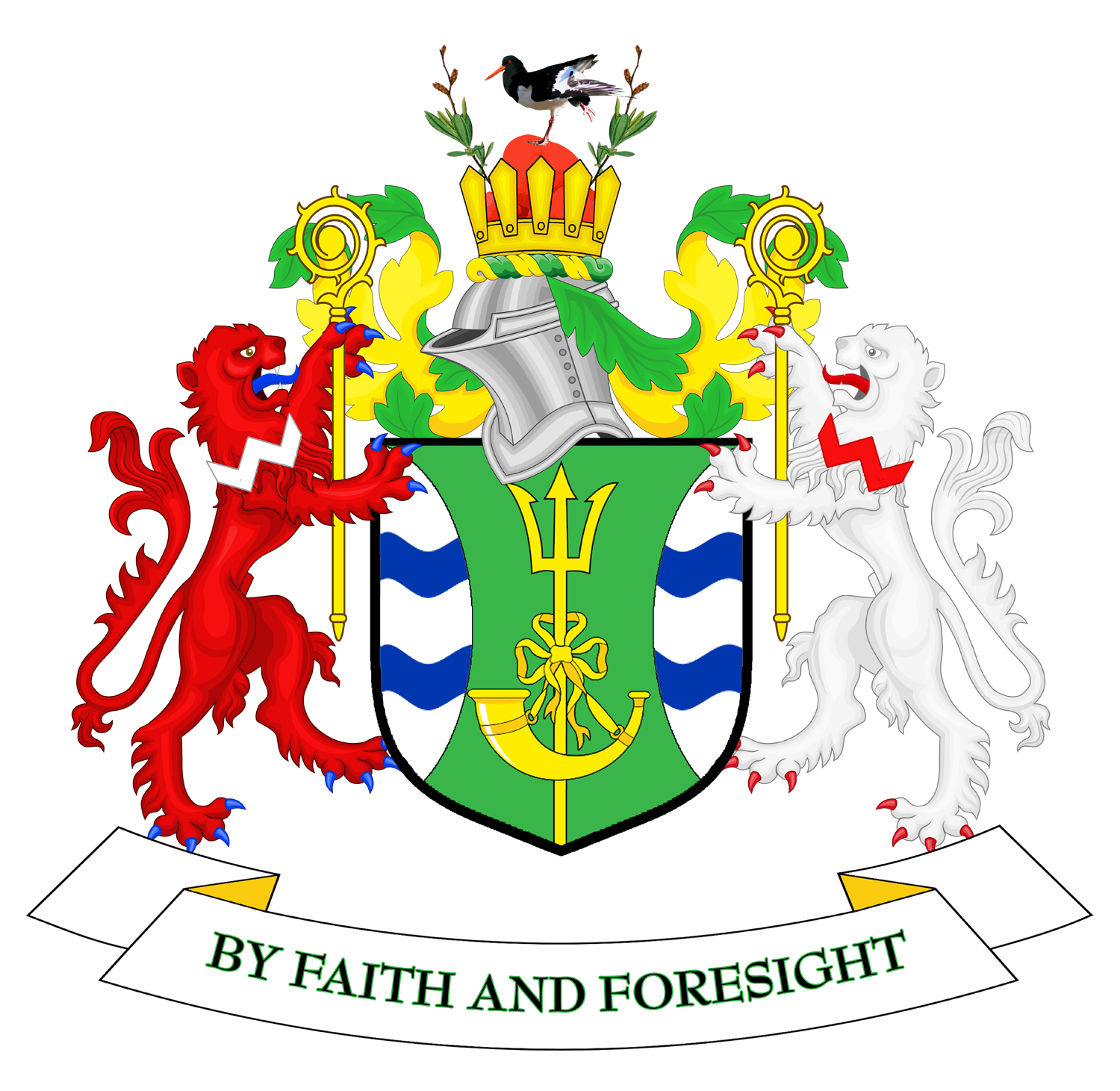
- 22 May 2014

23 of 66 seats (One Third and one by-election) to Wirral Metropolitan Borough Council 34 seats needed for a majority
- Turnout: 35.6% (▼0.8%)
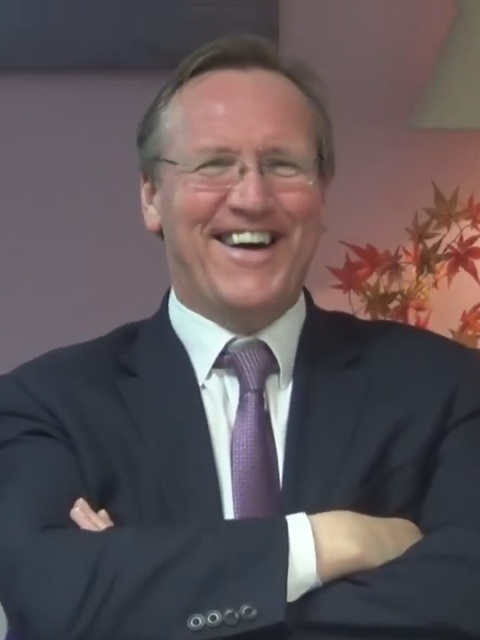

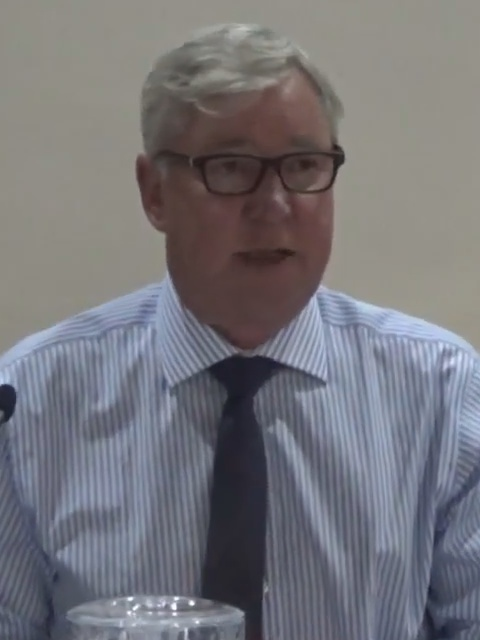

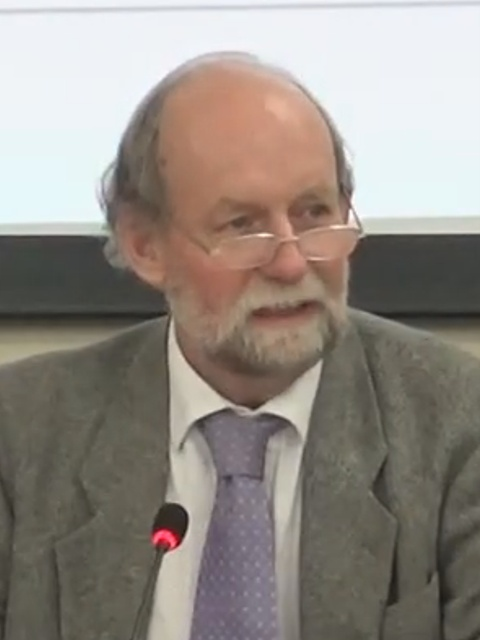

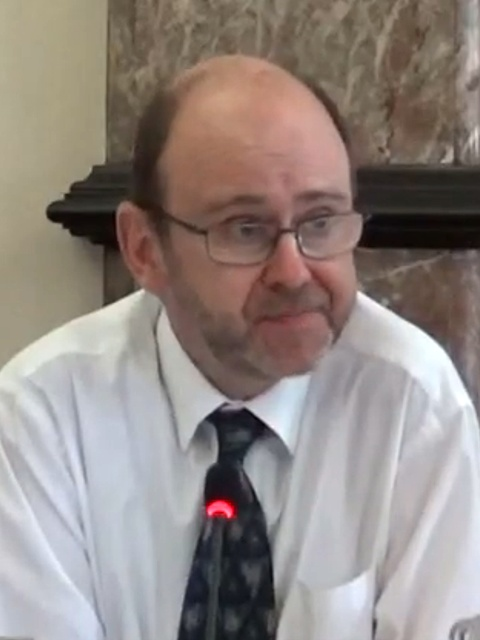
	First party	Second party
Leader	Phil Davies	Jeff Green
Party	Labour	Conservative
Leader's seat	Birkenhead and Tranmere	West Kirby and Thurstaston
Last election	13 seats, 44.6%	6 seats, 30.6%
Seats before	37	22
Seats won	12	8
Seats after	38	21
Seat change	▲1	▼1
Popular vote	33,145	24,105
Percentage	38.6%	28.0%
Swing	▼6.0%	▼2.6%
	Third party	Fourth party
Leader	Phil Gilchrist	Pat Cleary
Party	Liberal Democrats	Green
Leader's seat	Eastham	Birkenhead and Tranmere
Last election	2 seats, 10.9%	0 seats, 5.9%
Seats before	6	0
Seats won	2	1
Seats after	6	1
Seat change	Steady	▲1
Popular vote	6,728	6,835
Percentage	7.8%	8.0%
Swing	▼3.1%	▲2.1%
- Map of results of 2014 election
Leader of the Council before election
Phil Davies
Labour
Leader of the Council after election
Phil Davies
Labour

The 2014 Wirral Metropolitan Borough Council election took place on 22 May 2014 to elect members of Wirral Metropolitan Borough Council in England. This election was held on the same day as other local elections.

After the election, the composition of the council was:

Party	Seats	±
Labour	38	▲1
Conservative	21	▼1
Liberal Democrat	6	Steady
Green	1	▲1
Independent	0	▼1

== Election results ==
=== Overall election result ===
Overall result compared with 2012.

Wirral Metropolitan Borough Council election result, 2014
Party	Candidates						Votes		
Party	Stood	Elected	Gained	Unseated	Net	% of total	%	No.	Net %
Labour	23	12	2	1	▲1	54.5	38.6	33,145	▼6.0
Conservative	23	8	0	1	▼1	31.8	28.0	24,105	▼2.6
UKIP	22	0	0	0	Steady	0.0	17.2	14,793	▲9.8
Green	22	1	1	0	▲1	4.5	8.0	6,835	▲2.1
Liberal Democrats	18	2	0	0	Steady	9.1	7.8	6,728	▼3.1
Independent	3	0	0	1	▼1	0.0	0.3	239	▼0.1
TUSC	2	0	0	0	Steady	0.0	0.1	91	▼0.1

(Note: % of total refers to % of wards won.)

=== Changes in council composition ===
Prior to the election the composition of the council was:

↓
37	22	6	1
Lab	Con	LD	I

After the election the composition of the council was:

↓
38	21	6	1
Lab	Con	LD	G

== Ward results ==
Results compared directly with the last local election in 2012.

=== Bebington ===
Bebington
Party	Candidate	Votes	%	±%
Labour	Walter Smith	2,165	48.7	▼5.1
Conservative	Des Drury	1,013	22.8	▼8.8
UKIP	Hilary Jones	873	19.6	▲11.5
Green	Anthony Smith	289	6.5	▲2.9
Liberal Democrats	Peter Faulkner	110	2.5	▼0.4
Majority		1,152	25.9	▲3.7
Registered electors		11,956		
Turnout			37.3	▼3.1
Labour hold		Swing	▲1.9	

=== Bidston and St James ===
Bidston and St James
Party	Candidate	Votes	%	±%
Labour	Ann McLachlan	1,701	64.6	▼13.6
UKIP	Cathy Williams	540	20.5	▲15.2
Conservative	Geoffrey Dormant	190	7.2	▲0.2
Green	Colin Dignam-Gill	106	4.0	▲0.7
Liberal Democrats	Roy Wood	53	2.0	▼0.9
TUSC	Greg North	43	1.6	New
Majority		1,161	44.1	▼27.1
Registered electors		9,932		
Turnout			26.6	▲0.6
Labour hold		Swing	▼13.6	

=== Birkenhead and Tranmere ===
Birkenhead and Tranmere
Party	Candidate	Votes	%	±%
Green	Pat Cleary	1,658	47.6	▲6.6
Labour	Brian Kenny	1,421	40.8	▼8.9
UKIP	Laurence Sharpe-Stevens	334	9.6	▲6.3
Conservative	June Cowin	69	2.0	▲0.2
Majority		237	6.8	N/A
Registered electors		9,882		
Turnout			35.4	▲4.2
Green gain from Labour		Swing	▲7.8	

=== Bromborough ===
Bromborough
Party	Candidate	Votes	%	±%
Labour	Irene Williams	1,709	49.9	▼14.9
UKIP	Sue Colquhoun	772	22.6	▲14.2
Conservative	Peter Taylor	469	13.7	▲0.5
Liberal Democrats	Penelope Golby	247	7.2	▼1.2
Green	Percy Hogg	225	6.6	▲1.3
Majority		937	27.3	▼24.3
Majority		1,152	25.9	▲3.7
Registered electors		11,312		
Turnout			30.4	▼2.0
Labour hold		Swing	▼12.2	

=== Clatterbridge ===
Clatterbridge
Party	Candidate	Votes	%	±%
Conservative	Tracey Smith	1,911	40.6	▼6.4
Labour	Jenny Holliday	1,491	31.6	▼2.8
UKIP	Roger Jones	802	17.0	▲9.2
Liberal Democrats	Matthew Donnelly	266	5.6	▼1.5
Green	Colin Thompson	241	5.1	▲1.4
Majority		420	9.0	▼3.6
Registered electors		11,684		
Turnout			40.5	▼0.2
Conservative hold		Swing	▼1.8	

=== Claughton ===
Claughton
Party	Candidate	Votes	%	±%
Labour	Denise Roberts	1,912	53.3	▼12.3
UKIP	Philip Griffiths	760	21.2	▲12.8
Conservative	Barbara Sinclair	522	14.5	▼1.4
Green	Paul Cartlidge	222	6.2	▲1.3
Liberal Democrats	Chris Teggin	172	4.8	▼0.4
Majority		1,152	32.1	▼17.6
Registered electors		11,184		
Turnout			32.2	▼0.5
Labour hold		Swing	▼8.8	

=== Eastham ===
Eastham
Party	Candidate	Votes	%	±%
Liberal Democrats	Chris Carubia	1,558	39.5	▼10.8
Labour	Mike Thompson	1,180	29.9	▼6.1
UKIP	Ryan Bingham	592	15.0	▲9.9
Conservative	Keith Jack	469	11.9	▲4.5
Green	Oliver Downing	147	3.7	▲2.4
Majority		378	9.6	▼4.7
Registered electors		10,889		
Turnout			36.4	▼2.8
Liberal Democrats hold		Swing	▼2.4	

=== Greasby, Frankby and Irby ===
Greasby, Frankby and Irby
Party	Candidate	Votes	%	±%
Conservative	Wendy Clements (Note: Elected to serve a 4-year term.)	2,193	38.6	▲1.3
Conservative	Tom Anderson (Note: Elected to serve a 2-year term.)	1,687	–	–
Labour	Julie McManus	1,186	20.9	▼2.8
Liberal Democrats	Peter Reisdorf	1,076	19.0	▼7.1
Labour	Lee Rushworth	838	–	–
Liberal Democrats	John Creswell	749	–	–
UKIP	Derek Snowden	809	14.3	▲5.7
Green	Rachel Markey	208	7.3	▲3.0
Majority		1,007	17.7	▲6.5
Registered electors		11,501		
Turnout			43.0	▲0.4
Conservative hold		Swing	▲3.3	
Conservative hold		Swing	–	

=== Heswall ===
Heswall
Party	Candidate	Votes	%	±%
Conservative	Les Rowlands	2,398	55.7	▼7.0
UKIP	David Scott	773	17.9	▲8.5
Labour	Mike Holliday	668	15.5	▼2.3
Green	Barbara Burton	277	6.4	▲0.5
Liberal Democrats	David Tyrrell	191	4.4	▲0.2
Majority		1,625	37.8	▲0.6
Registered electors		10,894		
Turnout			39.7	▼0.8
Conservative hold		Swing	▼3.6	

=== Hoylake and Meols ===
Hoylake and Meols
Party	Candidate	Votes	%	±%
Conservative	Eddie Boult	1,912	46.7	▼6.9
Labour	Pat Glasman (Note: Incumbent councillor for New Brighton ward.)	1,075	26.2	▼0.3
UKIP	George Robinson	531	13.0	▲6.1
Green	Yvonne McGinley	423	10.3	▲1.9
Liberal Democrats	Joseph McDowell	155	3.8	▼0.9
Majority		837	20.5	▼6.6
Registered electors		10,403		
Turnout			39.5	▲0.7
Conservative hold		Swing	▼3.3	

=== Leasowe and Moreton East ===
Leasowe and Moreton East
Party	Candidate	Votes	%	±%
Labour	Treena Johnson	1,819	45.5	▼5.5
Conservative	Ian Lewis	1,633	40.8	▼2.5
UKIP	Frank Whitham	433	10.8	▲7.3
Green	David Dubost	116	2.9	▲0.7
Majority		186	4.7	▼3.2
Registered electors		10,691		
Turnout			37.5	▼1.8
Labour gain from Conservative		Swing	▼1.5	

=== Liscard ===
Liscard
Party	Candidate	Votes	%	±%
Labour	Matthew Daniel	1,619	46.9	▼3.0
UKIP	Lynda Williams	815	23.6	▲13.0
Conservative	Ann Lavin	649	18.8	▼14.6
Green	Craig Reynolds	273	7.9	▲1.8
Liberal Democrats	Daniel Clein	94	2.7	New
Majority		804	23.3	▲6.8
Registered electors		11,120		
Turnout			31.2	▼3.3
Labour hold		Swing	▲3.4	

=== Moreton West and Saughall Massie ===
Moreton West and Saughall Massie
Party	Candidate	Votes	%	±%
Conservative	Bruce Berry	1,817	43.9	▼13.5
Labour	Karl Greaney	1,484	35.9	▲1.3
UKIP	Susan Whitham	678	16.4	▲10.8
Green	Perle Sheldricks	160	3.9	▲1.5
Majority		333	8.0	▼14.8
Registered electors		10,885		
Turnout			38.1	▲0.9
Conservative hold		Swing	▼7.4	

=== New Brighton ===
New Brighton
Party	Candidate	Votes	%	±%
Labour	Christine Spriggs	1,658	42.3	▼10.5
Conservative	Tony Pritchard	1,348	34.4	▲5.9
UKIP	John Brown	492	12.6	▲2.5
Green	John Howe	418	10.7	▲2.2
Majority		310	7.9	▼16.4
Registered electors		10,823		
Turnout			36.3	▲2.3
Labour hold		Swing	▼8.2	

=== Oxton ===
Oxton
Party	Candidate	Votes	%	±%
Liberal Democrats	Alan Brighouse	1,620	38.3	▼7.5
Labour	Angela Davies	1,483	35.1	▼4.7
UKIP	David Martin	563	13.3	▲7.5
Conservative	Peter Hartley	310	7.3	▲2.1
Green	Liz Heydon	250	5.9	▲2.5
Majority		137	3.2	▼2.8
Registered electors		11,281		
Turnout			37.5	▼2.4
Liberal Democrats hold		Swing	▼1.4	

=== Pensby and Thingwall ===
Pensby and Thingwall
Party	Candidate	Votes	%	±%
Labour	Louise Reecejones	1,334	32.6	▼0.2
Conservative	Denis Knowles	1,172	28.7	▲0.3
UKIP	Jan Davison	916	22.4	▲13.2
Liberal Democrats	Damien Cummins	390	9.5	▼15.7
Green	Allen Burton	274	6.7	▲2.3
Majority		162	4.0	▼0.4
Registered electors		10,520		
Turnout			39.0	▼2.1
Labour gain from Independent		Swing	▼0.2	

=== Prenton ===
Prenton
Party	Candidate	Votes	%	±%
Labour	Denise Realey	1,731	47.0	▼6.9
UKIP	James Bradshaw	802	21.8	▲13.6
Conservative	Hilary Jones	578	15.7	▲6.4
Liberal Democrats	Allan Brame	310	8.4	▼15.0
Green	Moira Gommon	265	7.2	▲2.0
Majority		929	25.2	▼5.3
Registered electors		10,820		
Turnout			34.2	▼2.0
Labour hold		Swing	▼2.7	

=== Rock Ferry ===
Rock Ferry
Party	Candidate	Votes	%	±%
Labour	Moira McLaughlin	1,478	58.1	▼12.6
UKIP	Ann Flynn	531	20.9	▲13.8
Conservative	Barbara Poole	195	7.7	▲0.3
Green	Karl Cumings	164	6.4	▲2.2
Liberal Democrats	Brian Hall	64	2.5	▼0.6
Independent	James Pritchard	64	2.5	▼0.3
TUSC	Clay Brady	48	1.9	▼2.8
Majority		947	37.2	▼26.1
Registered electors		9,654		
Turnout			26.5	▼2.2
Labour hold		Swing	▼13.1	

=== Seacombe ===
Seacombe
Party	Candidate	Votes	%	±%
Labour	Adrian Jones	1,616	59.2	▼15.6
UKIP	Christopher Wellstead	688	25.2	▲14.8
Conservative	Suzanne Sheppick	211	7.7	▼2.0
Green	Jayne Clough	162	5.9	▲0.8
Independent	Karl Mercer	53	1.9	New
Majority		928	34.0	▼30.4
Registered electors		10,286		
Turnout			26.7	▲0.8
Labour hold		Swing	▼15.2	

=== Upton ===
Upton
Party	Candidate	Votes	%	±%
Labour	Stuart Whittingham	1,932	48.8	▼10.8
UKIP	Geoffrey Caton	942	23.8	▲14.7
Conservative	Geoffrey Gubb	760	19.2	▼3.4
Green	Jim McGinley	206	5.2	▲0.3
Liberal Democrats	Alan Davies	117	3.0	▼0.9
Majority		990	25.0	▼12.0
Registered electors		12,101		
Turnout			32.9	▼1.7
Labour hold		Swing	▼6.0	

=== Wallasey ===
Wallasey
Party	Candidate	Votes	%	±%
Conservative	Lesley Rennie	2,216	48.8	▼7.3
Labour	Paul Ronayne	1,291	28.5	▼5.1
UKIP	Brian Farrell	594	13.1	▲7.3
Green	Cynthia Stonall	288	6.3	▲1.9
Liberal Democrats	John Codling	148	3.3	New
Majority		925	20.3	▼2.2
Registered electors		11,752		
Turnout			38.7	▼1.3
Conservative hold		Swing	▼1.1	

=== West Kirby and Thurstaston ===
West Kirby and Thurstaston
Party	Candidate	Votes	%	±%
Conservative	Jeff Green	2,070	47.6	▼4.3
Labour	Helen Campbell	1,192	27.4	▲1.6
UKIP	David Evennett	553	12.7	▲7.2
Green	Shirley Johnson	259	5.9	▼0.5
Liberal Democrats	Mike Redfern	157	3.6	▼1.9
Independent	Charles Barnes	122	2.8	▼2.1
Majority		878	20.2	▼5.9
Registered electors		10,365		
Turnout			42.2	▲1.3
Conservative hold		Swing	▼3.0	

== Notes ==
• italics denote the sitting councillor • bold denotes the winning candidate
