= 2012 Wirral Metropolitan Borough Council election =

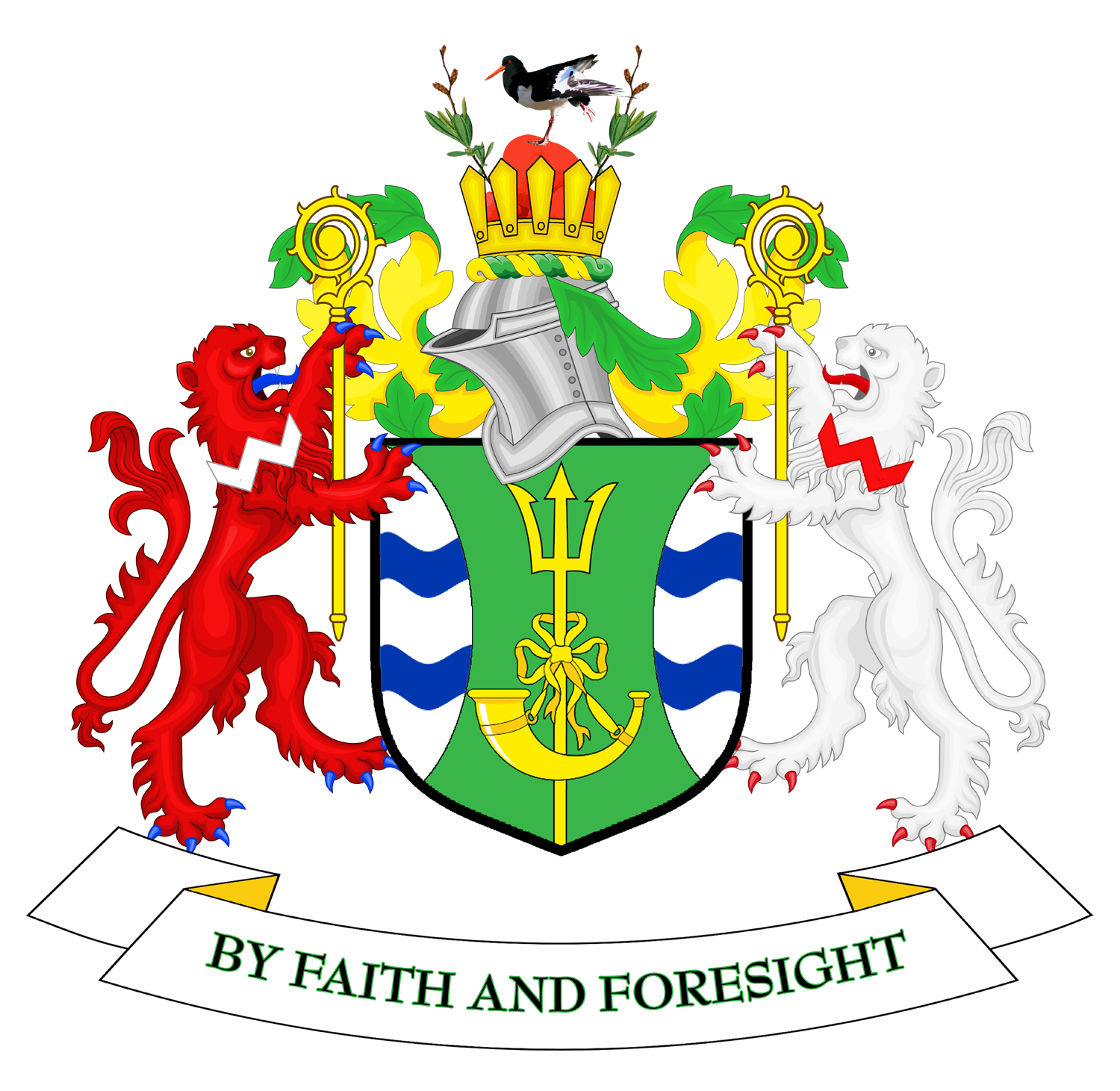
- 3 May 2012

22 of 66 seats (One Third) to Wirral Metropolitan Borough Council 34 seats needed for a majority
- Turnout: 36.4% (▼6.8%)
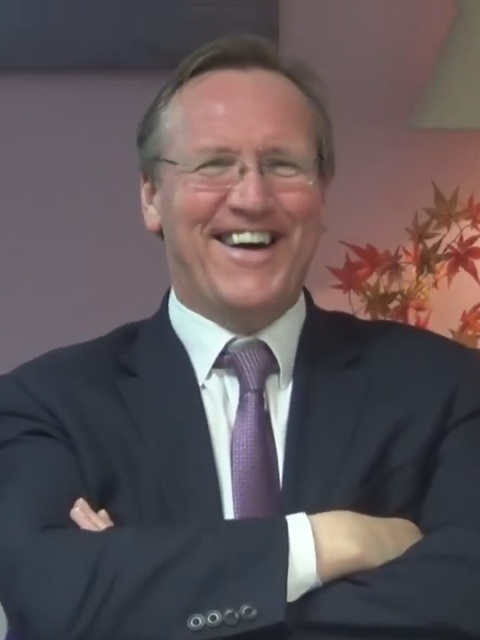

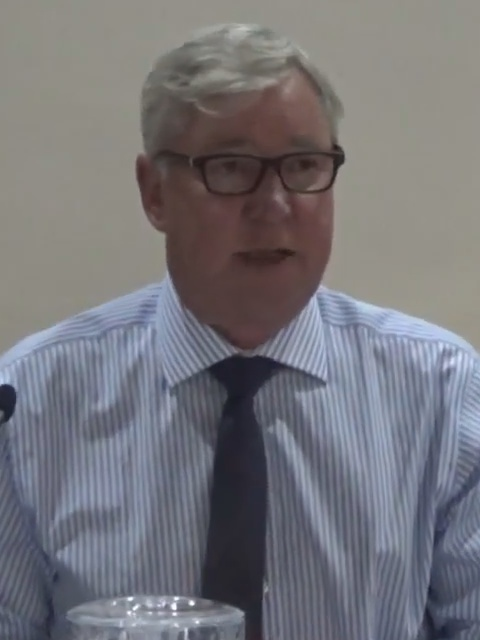

	First party	Second party	Third party
Leader	Phil Davies	Jeff Green	Tom Harney
Party	Labour	Conservative	Liberal Democrats
Leader's seat	Birkenhead and Tranmere	West Kirby and Thurstaston	Eastham
Last election	12 seats, 43.8%	9 seats, 33.8%	2 seats, 12.5%
Seats before	30	27	9
Seats won	13	7	2
Seats after	37	22	7
Seat change	▲7	▼5	▼2
Popular vote	38,455	26,426	9,375
Percentage	44.6%	30.6%	10.9%
Swing	▲0.8%	▼3.2%	▼1.6%
- Map of results of 2012 election
Leader of the Council before election
Jeff Green (Conservative)
No Overall Control
Leader of the Council after election
Phil Davies
Labour

The 2012 Wirral Metropolitan Borough Council election took place on 3 May 2012 to elect members of Wirral Metropolitan Borough Council in England. This election was held on the same day as other local elections.

Overall, Labour gained seven seats at the expense of the Conservatives and Liberal Democrats and gained overall control of the council, with a majority of eight.

After the election, the composition of the council was:

Party	Seats	±
Labour	37	▲7
Conservative	22	▼5
Liberal Democrat	7	▼2

== Election results ==
=== Overall election result ===
Overall result compared with 2011.

Wirral Metropolitan Borough Council election result, 2012
Party	Candidates						Votes		
Party	Stood	Elected	Gained	Unseated	Net	% of total	%	No.	Net %
Labour	22	13	7	0	▲7	59.1	44.6	38,455	▲0.8
Conservative	22	7	0	5	▼5	31.8	30.6	26,426	▼3.2
Liberal Democrats	16	2	0	2	▼2	9.1	10.9	9,375	▼1.6
UKIP	22	0	0	0	Steady	0.0	7.4	6,378	▲2.4
Green	22	0	0	0	Steady	0.0	5.9	5,064	▲1.1
Independent	3	0	0	1	Steady	0.0	0.4	364	▲0.3
TUSC	1	0	0	0	Steady	0.0	0.2	130	N/A
BNP	1	0	0	0	Steady	0.0	0.1	61	N/A

=== Changes in council composition ===
Prior to the election the composition of the council was:

↓
30	27	9
Lab	Con	LD

After the election the composition of the council was:

↓
37	21	7
Lab	Con	LD

== Ward results ==
Results compared directly with the last local election in 2011.

=== Bebington ===
Bebington
Party	Candidate	Votes	%	±%
Labour	Christina Muspratt	2,572	53.8	▼2.9
Conservative	Sheila Clarke	1,513	31.6	▲0.4
UKIP	Hilary Jones	386	8.1	▼0.2
Green	Michael Harper	173	3.6	▼0.2
Liberal Democrats	Peter Faulkner	40	2.9	New
Majority		1,059	22.2	▼3.3
Registered electors		11,886		
Turnout			40.4	▼7.8
Labour gain from Conservative		Swing	▼1.7	

=== Bidston and St James ===
Bidston and St James
Party	Candidate	Votes	%	±%
Labour	Jim Crabtree	1,992	78.2	▼1.2
Conservative	Peter Dawson	179	7.0	▼3.0
UKIP	Helen Romnes	136	5.3	▲0.3
Green	Colin Dignam-Gill	85	3.3	New
Independent	John Brace	82	3.2	New
Liberal Democrats	Roy Wood	73	2.9	▼2.7
Majority		1,813	71.2	▲1.8
Registered electors		9,817		
Turnout			26.0	▼3.3
Labour hold		Swing	▲0.9	

=== Birkenhead and Tranmere ===
Birkenhead and Tranmere
Party	Candidate	Votes	%	±%
Labour	Jean Stapleton	1,474	49.7	▼4.1
Green	Pat Cleary	1,215	41.0	▲6.1
UKIP	David Martin	99	3.3	▼0.3
Liberal Democrats	Allan Brame	61	2.1	▼0.9
BNP	Joe Killen	61	2.1	New
Conservative	June Cowin	54	1.8	▼2.7
Majority		259	8.7	▼10.3
Registered electors		9,527		
Turnout			31.2	▼2.0
Labour hold		Swing	▼5.1	

=== Bromborough ===
Bromborough
Party	Candidate	Votes	%	±%
Labour	Steve Niblock	2,292	64.8	▲6.9
Conservative	Kathryn Hodson	466	13.2	▼3.3
UKIP	Timothy Pass	298	8.4	▲3.4
Liberal Democrats	Penelope Golby	296	8.4	▼8.7
Green	Percy Hogg	187	5.3	▲1.8
Majority		1,826	51.6	▲10.8
Registered electors		10,969		
Turnout			32.4	▼9.6
Labour hold		Swing	▲5.4	

=== Clatterbridge ===
Clatterbridge
Party	Candidate	Votes	%	±%
Conservative	Cherry Povall	2,220	47.0	▲0.3
Labour	Phillip Brightmore	1,623	34.4	▲3.2
UKIP	Roger Jones	370	7.8	▲3.0
Liberal Democrats	Simon Thomson	337	7.1	▼7.1
Green	Jim McGinley	174	3.7	▲0.5
Majority		597	12.6	▼2.9
Registered electors		11,640		
Turnout			40.7	▼9.2
Conservative hold		Swing	▼1.5	

=== Claughton ===
Claughton
Party	Candidate	Votes	%	±%
Labour	George Davies	2,367	65.6	▲5.3
Conservative	Barbara Sinclair	575	15.9	▼6.1
UKIP	Bethan Williams	304	8.4	▲2.3
Liberal Democrats	Christopher Teggin	187	5.2	▼1.9
Green	Cathy Page	177	4.9	▲0.4
Majority		1,792	49.7	▲11.4
Registered electors		11,054		
Turnout			32.7	▼6.0
Labour hold		Swing	▲5.7	

=== Eastham ===
Eastham
Party	Candidate	Votes	%	±%
Liberal Democrats	Phillip Gilchrist	2,151	50.2	▲6.7
Labour	Mike Thompson	1,539	36.0	▲1.6
Conservative	Kevin Sharkey	315	7.4	▼9.5
UKIP	Laurence Jones	219	5.1	Steady
Green	Jackie Smith	55	1.3	New
Majority		612	14.3	▲5.1
Registered electors		10,964		
Turnout			39.2	▼4.7
Liberal Democrats hold		Swing	▲2.6	

=== Greasby, Frankby and Irby ===
Greasby, Frankby and Irby
Party	Candidate	Votes	%	±%
Conservative	Tony Cox	1,820	37.3	▼1.5
Liberal Democrats	Peter Reisdorf	1,277	26.1	▼0.5
Labour	Lee Rushworth	1,159	23.7	▼0.2
UKIP	Derek Snowden	421	8.6	▲3.3
Green	Rachel Markey	208	4.3	▼1.0
Majority		543	11.2	▼1.0
Registered electors		11,485		
Turnout			42.6	▼10.0
Conservative hold		Swing	▼0.5	

=== Heswall ===
Heswall
Party	Candidate	Votes	%	±%
Conservative	Peter Johnson	2,766	62.7	▼2.2
Labour	Audrey Moore	785	17.8	▼0.6
UKIP	David Scott	413	9.4	▲4.4
Green	Barbara Burton	261	5.9	▲1.0
Liberal Democrats	David Tyrrell	186	4.2	▼2.6
Majority		1,981	44.9	▼1.6
Registered electors		10,926		
Turnout			40.5	▼12.4
Conservative hold		Swing	▼0.8	

=== Hoylake and Meols ===
Hoylake and Meols
Party	Candidate	Votes	%	±%
Conservative	John Hale	2,134	53.6	▼3.3
Labour	Alan Milne	1,056	26.5	▲1.0
Liberal Democrats	Joseph McDowell	187	4.7	▼3.3
Green	Yvonne McGinley	334	8.4	▲1.5
UKIP	George Robinson	274	6.9	▲4.1
Majority		1,078	27.1	▼4.3
Registered electors		10,327		
Turnout			38.8	▼10.0
Conservative hold		Swing	▼2.2	

=== Leasowe and Moreton East ===
Leasowe and Moreton East
Party	Candidate	Votes	%	±%
Labour	Anita Leech	2,094	51.0	▼4.4
Conservative	Ian Lewis	1,776	43.3	▲7.8
UKIP	Catherine Williams	144	3.5	▲0.1
Green	Cynthia Stonall	89	2.2	▼1.0
Majority		318	7.7	▼12.2
Registered electors		10,466		
Turnout			39.3	▼2.5
Labour gain from Conservative		Swing	▼6.1	

=== Liscard ===
Liscard
Party	Candidate	Votes	%	±%
Labour	Janette Williamson	1,882	49.9	▼4.2
Conservative	James Keeley	1,261	33.4	▼2.4
UKIP	Lynda Williams	400	10.6	▲6.2
Green	Kenneth Peers	230	6.1	▲3.0
Majority		621	16.5	▼1.8
Registered electors		10,991		
Turnout			34.5	▼7.8
Labour gain from Conservative		Swing	▼0.9	

=== Moreton West and Saughall Massie ===
Moreton West and Saughall Massie
Party	Candidate	Votes	%	±%
Conservative	Chris Blakeley	2,269	57.4	▲6.9
Labour	Karl Greaney	1,369	34.6	▼5.1
UKIP	Susan Whitham	223	5.6	▲1.2
Green	Perle Sheldricks	95	2.4	▲0.3
Majority		900	22.8	▲12.0
Registered electors		10,655		
Turnout			37.2	▼4.5
Conservative hold		Swing	▲6.0	

=== New Brighton ===
New Brighton
Party	Candidate	Votes	%	±%
Labour	Robert Gregson	1,908	52.8	▲3.2
Conservative	Sue Taylor	1,032	28.5	▼6.7
UKIP	Bill Duffey	366	10.1	▲4.6
Green	James Brady	309	8.5	▲2.8
Majority		876	24.3	▲9.9
Registered electors		10,669		
Turnout			34.0	▼8.8
Labour gain from Conservative		Swing	▲5.0	

=== Oxton ===
Oxton
Party	Candidate	Votes	%	±%
Liberal Democrats	Pat Williams	2,026	45.8	▲6.0
Labour	Matthew Patrick	1,763	39.8	▲2.6
UKIP	Philip Grittiths	258	5.8	▲0.9
Conservative	Tina McDonnell	232	5.2	▼8.4
Green	Elisabeth Heydon	149	3.4	▼1.2
Majority		263	6.0	▲3.4
Registered electors		11,140		
Turnout			39.9	▼3.7
Liberal Democrats hold		Swing	▲1.7	

=== Pensby and Thingwall ===
Pensby and Thingwall
Party	Candidate	Votes	%	±%
Labour	Michael Sullivan	1,406	32.8	▲0.7
Conservative	Tom Anderson (Note: Incumbent councillor for Upton ward.)	1,217	28.4	▼8.5
Liberal Democrats	Damien Cummins	1,079	25.2	▲1.5
UKIP	Janet Davison	394	9.2	▲5.4
Green	Allen Burton	190	4.4	▲0.9
Majority		189	4.4	N/A
Registered electors		10,462		
Turnout			41.1	▼7.7
Labour gain from Liberal Democrats		Swing	▲4.6	

=== Prenton ===
Prenton
Party	Candidate	Votes	%	±%
Labour	Tony Norbury	2,061	53.9	▲2.7
Liberal Democrats	Frank Doyle	895	23.4	▼2.9
Conservative	Cyrus Ferguson	357	9.3	▼5.0
UKIP	James Bradshaw	313	8.2	▲3.1
Green	Mark Mitchell	200	5.2	▲2.1
Majority		1,166	30.5	▲5.6
Registered electors		10,595		
Turnout			36.2	▼6.9
Labour gain from Liberal Democrats		Swing	▲2.8	

=== Rock Ferry ===
Rock Ferry
Party	Candidate	Votes	%	±%
Labour	Bill Davies	1,941	70.7	▼0.6
Conservative	Barbara Poole	202	7.4	▼5.0
UKIP	Ann Flynn	195	7.1	▼0.4
TUSC	Morag Reid	130	4.7	New
Green	Joy Hogg	115	4.2	▲0.9
Liberal Democrats	Brian Hall	85	3.1	▼2.4
Independent	Jim Pritchard	76	2.8	New
Majority		1,739	63.3	▲4.4
Registered electors		9,564		
Turnout			28.7	▼2.5
Labour hold		Swing	▲2.2	

=== Seacombe ===
Seacombe
Party	Candidate	Votes	%	±%
Labour	John Salter	1,996	74.8	▲10.4
UKIP	Christopher Wellstead	278	10.4	▲1.7
Conservative	Ann Lavin	258	9.7	▼10.9
Green	Timothy Denton	135	5.1	▲1.9
Majority		1,718	64.4	▲20.6
Registered electors		10,338		
Turnout			25.9	▼5.6
Labour hold		Swing	▲10.3	

=== Upton ===
Upton
Party	Candidate	Votes	%	±%
Labour	Sylvia Hodrien	2,504	59.6	▲2.0
Conservative	Denis Knowles	948	22.6	▼7.6
UKIP	Patricia Lamb	381	9.1	▲4.6
Green	Lesley Hussenbux	205	4.9	▲1.7
Liberal Democrats	Alan Davies	164	3.9	▼0.7
Majority		1,556	37.0	▲9.6
Registered electors		12,171		
Turnout			34.6	▼6.5
Labour gain from Conservative		Swing	▲4.8	

=== Wallasey ===
Wallasey
Party	Candidate	Votes	%	±%
Conservative	Leah Fraser	2,652	56.1	▲6.9
Labour	Alan Hannaford	1,590	33.6	▼3.8
UKIP	Ian Watson	276	5.8	▲1.4
Green	Janet Wright	208	4.4	▲0.2
Majority		1,062	22.5	▲10.7
Registered electors		11,863		
Turnout			40.0	▼5.9
Conservative hold		Swing	▲5.4	

=== West Kirby and Thurstaston ===
West Kirby and Thurstaston
Party	Candidate	Votes	%	±%
Conservative	Geoffrey Watt	2,180	51.9	▼1.1
Labour	Louise Reecejones	1,082	25.8	▲0.3
Green	Shirley Johnson	270	6.4	▲1.2
Liberal Democrats	John Cresswell	231	5.5	▼3.6
UKIP	Frank Whitham	230	5.5	▲1.3
Independent	Charles Barnes	206	4.9	▲2.0
Majority		1,098	26.1	▼1.4
Registered electors		10,276		
Turnout			40.9	▼10.8
Conservative hold		Swing	▼0.7	

== Changes between 2012 and 2014 ==
=== Leasowe and Moreton East by-election 2013 ===
By-election, 17 January 2013: Leasowe and Moreton East
Party	Candidate	Votes	%	±%
Conservative	Ian Lewis	1,620	50.5	▲7.2
Labour	Pauline Daniels	1,355	42.2	▼8.8
UKIP	Susan Whitham	148	4.6	▲1.1
TUSC	Mark Halligan	31	1.0	New
Liberal Democrats	Daniel Clein	28	0.9	New
Green	Jim McGinley	28	0.9	▼1.3
Majority		265	8.3	N/A
Registered electors		10,551		
Turnout			30.5	▼8.8
Conservative gain from Labour		Swing	▲8.0	

=== Heswall by-election 2013 ===
By-election, 17 January 2013: Heswall
Party	Candidate	Votes	%	±%
Conservative	Kathryn Hodson	1,254	58.8	▼3.9
UKIP	David Scott	460	21.6	▲12.2
Labour	Mike Holliday	289	13.6	▼4.2
Green	Barbara Burton	110	5.2	▼0.7
TUSC	Greg North	19	0.9	New
Majority		794	37.2	▼7.7
Registered electors		10,855		
Turnout			19.7	▼20.8
Conservative hold		Swing	▼3.9	

=== Pensby and Thingwall by-election 2013 ===
By-election, 28 February 2013: Pensby and Thingwall
Party	Candidate	Votes	%	±%
Labour	Phillip Brightmore	1,411	38.5	▲5.7
Conservative	Sheila Clarke	868	23.7	▼4.7
Liberal Democrats	Damien Cummins	834	22.7	▼2.5
UKIP	Jan Davison	426	11.6	▲2.4
Green	Allen Burton	74	2.0	▼2.4
English Democrat	Neil Kenny	53	1.4	New
Majority		543	14.8	▲10.4
Registered electors		10,487		
Turnout			35.0	▼6.1
Labour gain from Conservative		Swing	▲5.2	

=== Upton by-election 2013 ===
By-election, 24 October 2013: Upton
Party	Candidate	Votes	%	±%
Labour	Matthew Patrick	1,954	65.4	▲5.8
Conservative	Geoffrey Gubb	762	25.5	▲2.9
Green	Jim McGinley	143	4.8	▼0.1
Liberal Democrats	Alan Davies	130	4.3	▲0.4
Majority		1,192	39.9	▲2.9
Registered electors		12,154		
Turnout		3,031	24.9	▼9.7
Rejected ballots		21	0.7	
Labour hold		Swing	▲1.5	

=== Other changes ===
Date	Ward	Name	Previous affiliation	New affiliation	Circumstance
30 April 2013	Pensby and Thingwall	Mark Johnston	Liberal Democrats	Independent	Resigned.

== Notes ==
• italics denote the sitting councillor • bold denotes the winning candidate
