= South Wirral High School =

Secondary comprehensive school in Wirral, England

Location
- Plymyard Avenue; Eastham, Merseyside, CH62 8EH; England; 53.3116°N 2.9777°W

Information
- Type: Foundation comprehensive
- Motto: "Raising Aspirations in Partnership with Families and the Community"
- Established: 1969
- Local authority: Wirral
- Department for Education URN: 105107 Tables
- Ofsted: Reports
- Chair of Governors: Richard Barker
- Head Teacher: M. Cloherty
- Deputy Head: G. Williams
- Gender: Mixed
- Age: 11 to 18
- Enrolment: apx 1100
- Houses: Laird; Wilson; Stanley; Mayer
- Colour: Red Turquoise Violet
- Website: http://www.southwirral.wirral.sch.uk/

South Wirral High School is a coeducational foundation secondary school and sixth form located in Eastham, Merseyside, England. It has specialisms in Visual & Performing Arts alongside ICT & Computing.

== History ==
South Wirral High School was established in 1985, by the merger of 'Eastham Secondary School' and 'Bromborough Secondary School'. It is situated on the former Eastham Secondary School site. Prior to being a high school, the site was a prisoner of war camp during the Second World War.

== Facilities ==
The school contains 2 large Sports Halls, Dance and Drama studios and 9 ICT suites. It has a SSAT Leading Edge status.

When the school became a Visual & Performing Arts College, a number of facilities were built or improved including a specialist 'VAPA Studio' often used for Performing Arts subjects and as a temporary Art Exhibition space to showcase GCSE and A Level students' work.

== Notable former students ==
- James Garner (footballer, born 2001)
