= 2011 Wirral Metropolitan Borough Council election =

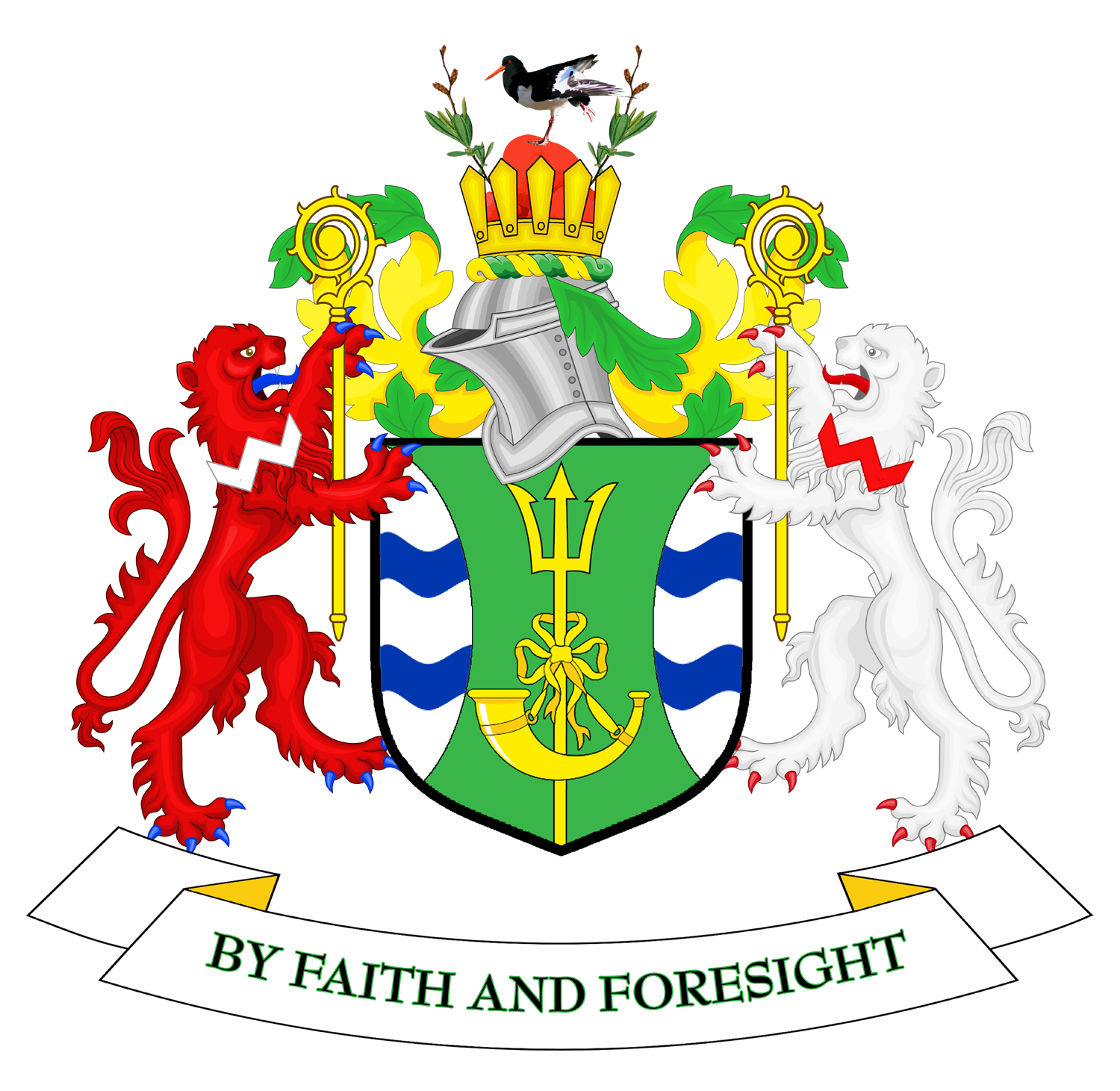
- 5 May 2011

23 of 66 seats (One Third and one by-election) to Wirral Metropolitan Borough Council 34 seats needed for a majority
- Turnout: 43.2% (▼22.1%)
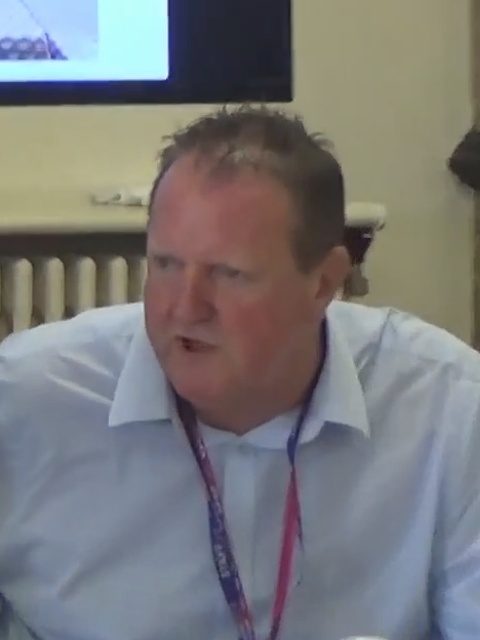

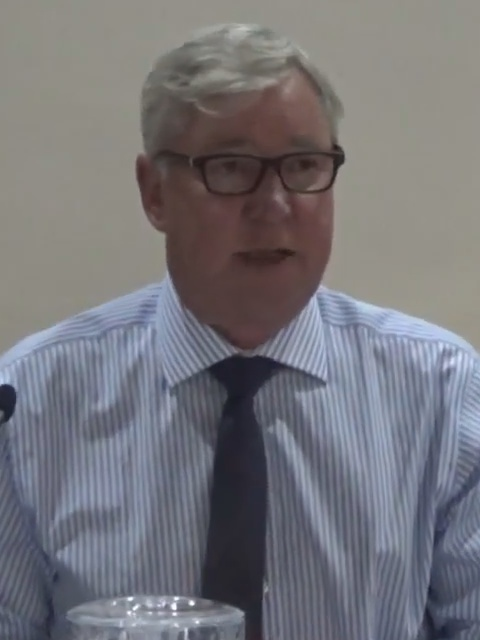

	First party	Second party	Third party
Leader	Steve Foulkes	Jeff Green	Simon Holbrook
Party	Labour	Conservative	Liberal Democrats
Leader's seat	Claughton	West Kirby and Thurstaston	Prenton (lost)
Last election	12 seats, 37.6%	8 seats, 32.1%	3 seats, 22.5%
Seats before	24	27	15
Seats won	12	9	2
Seats after	29	27	10
Seat change	▲5	Steady	▼5
Popular vote	45,006	34,738	12,815
Percentage	43.8%	33.8%	12.5%
Swing	▲6.2%	▲1.7%	▼10.0%
- Map of results of 2011 election
Leader of the Council before election
Jeff Green (Conservative)
No Overall Control
Leader of the Council after election
Steve Foulkes (Labour)
No Overall Control

The 2011 Wirral Metropolitan Borough Council election took place on 5 May 2011 to elect members of Wirral Metropolitan Borough Council in England. This election was held on the same day as other local elections.

The composition of the council after the election
Party	Seats	±
Labour	29	▲5
Conservative	27	Steady
Liberal Democrat	10	▼5

== Election results ==
=== Overall election result ===
Overall result compared with 2010.

Wirral Metropolitan Borough Council election result, 2011
Party	Candidates						Votes		
Party	Stood	Elected	Gained	Unseated	Net	% of total	%	No.	Net %
Labour	23	12	5	0	▲5	54.5	43.8	45,006	▲6.2
Conservative	23	9	3	3	Steady	36.4	33.8	34,738	▲1.7
Liberal Democrats	22	2	0	5	▼5	9.1	12.5	12,815	▼10.0
UKIP	23	0	0	0	Steady	0.0	5.0	5,165	▲1.6
Green	20	0	0	0	Steady	0.0	4.8	4,904	▲1.2
Independent	1	0	0	0	Steady	0.0	0.1	154	N/A

(Note: % of total refers to % of wards won.)

=== Changes in council composition ===
Prior to the election the composition of the council was:

↓
24	27	14	1
Lab	Con	LD	V

After the election the composition of the council was:

↓
29	27	10
Lab	Con	LD

== Ward results ==
Results compared directly with the last local election in 2010.

=== Bebington ===
Bebington
Party	Candidate	Votes	%	±%
Labour	Jerry Williams	3,200	56.7	▲10.8
Conservative	Kevin Sharkey	1,762	31.2	▲1.4
UKIP	Hilary Jones	466	8.3	▲2.1
Green	Michael Harper	212	3.8	▲1.6
Majority		1,438	25.5	▲9.4
Registered electors		11,756		
Turnout			48.2	▼23.2
Labour hold		Swing	▲4.7	

=== Bidston and St James ===
Bidston and St James
Party	Candidate	Votes	%	±%
Labour	Harry Smith	2,259	79.4	▲16.3
Conservative	Jerrold Vickers	284	10.0	▼0.8
Liberal Democrats	John Brace	160	5.6	▼9.4
UKIP	Helen Romnes	142	5.0	▲1.7
Majority		1,975	69.4	▲21.3
Registered electors		9,781		
Turnout			29.3	▼18.8
Labour hold		Swing	▲10.7	

=== Birkenhead and Tranmere ===
Birkenhead and Tranmere
Party	Candidate	Votes	%	±%
Labour	Phillip Davies	1,750	53.9	▲2.1
Green	Pat Cleary	1,133	34.9	▲11.3
Conservative	June Cowin	148	4.6	▼3.6
UKIP	David Martin	120	3.7	▼0.6
Liberal Democrats	Allan Brame	95	3.0	▼9.3
Majority		617	19.0	▼9.3
Registered electors		9,807		
Turnout			33.2	▼14.1
Labour hold		Swing	▼4.6	

=== Bromborough ===
Bromborough
Party	Candidate	Votes	%	±%
Labour	Joe Walsh	2,609	57.9	▲13.3
Liberal Democrats	Robert Moon	768	17.1	▼9.8
Conservative	Kathryn Hodson	742	16.5	▼4.6
UKIP	Timothy Pass	227	5.0	New
Green	Percy Hogg	157	3.5	▲1.0
Majority		1,841	40.8	▲23.1
Registered electors		10,762		
Turnout			42.0	▼21.7
Labour gain from Liberal Democrats		Swing	▲11.6	

=== Clatterbridge ===
Clatterbridge
Party	Candidate	Votes	%	±%
Conservative	Adam Sykes	2,688	46.7	▲3.3
Labour	Audrey Moore	1,798	31.2	▲7.8
Liberal Democrats	Simon Thomson	816	14.2	▼12.7
UKIP	Philip Griffiths	275	4.8	▲0.6
Green	Jim McGinley	182	3.2	▲1.0
Majority		890	15.5	▼1.0
Registered electors		11,611		
Turnout			49.9	▼24.8
Conservative gain from Liberal Democrats		Swing	▼0.5	

=== Claughton ===
Claughton
Party	Candidate	Votes	%	±%
Labour	Stephen Foulkes	2,613	60.3	▲8.8
Conservative	Barbara Sinclair	952	22.0	▼1.0
Liberal Democrats	Roy Wood	308	7.1	▼10.2
UKIP	Bethan Williams	265	6.1	▲1.4
Green	Cathy Page	197	4.5	▲1.0
Majority		1,661	38.3	▲9.8
Registered electors		11,272		
Turnout			38.7	▼22.3
Labour hold		Swing	▲4.9	

=== Eastham ===
Eastham
Party	Candidate	Votes	%	±%
Liberal Democrats	Dave Mitchell	2,091	43.6	▼6.4
Labour	Robert Gregson	1,648	34.4	▲9.0
Conservative	Colin Hughes	809	16.9	▼4.6
UKIP	Laurence Jones	244	5.1	▲2.0
Majority		443	9.2	▼15.4
Registered electors		10,977		
Turnout			43.9	▼25.3
Liberal Democrats hold		Swing	▼7.7	

=== Greasby, Frankby and Irby ===
Greasby, Frankby and Irby
Party	Candidate	Votes	%	±%
Conservative	Mike Hornby (Note: Elected to serve a 4-year term.)	2,409	38.8	▼1.5
Conservative	Tony Cox (Note: Elected to serve a 1-year term.)	2,292	–	–
Liberal Democrats	Peter Reisdorf	1,652	26.6	▼6.9
Labour	Andrew Hollingworth	1,483	23.9	▲3.4
Liberal Democrats	Frank Doyle	1,220	–	–
Labour	Lee Rushworth	1,208	–	–
UKIP	Patricia Lamb	331	5.3	▲2.0
Green	Kathryn Peers	327	5.3	▲2.8
UKIP	Timothy Crooke	246	–	–
Majority		757	12.2	▲5.4
Registered electors		11,497		
Turnout			52.6	▼23.4
Conservative gain from Liberal Democrats		Swing	▲2.7	
Conservative gain from Liberal Democrats		Swing	–	

=== Heswall ===
Heswall
Party	Candidate	Votes	%	±%
Conservative	Andrew Hodson	3,745	64.9	▲5.8
Labour	Alan Hannaford	1,065	18.4	▲1.1
Liberal Democrats	David Tyrrell	392	6.8	▼11.3
UKIP	David Scott	290	5.0	▲2.5
Green	Barbara Burton	281	4.9	▲1.9
Majority		2,680	46.5	▲5.5
Registered electors		10,965		
Turnout			52.9	▼24.5
Conservative hold		Swing	▲2.8	

=== Hoylake and Meols ===
Hoylake and Meols
Party	Candidate	Votes	%	±%
Conservative	Gerry Ellis	2,866	56.9	▲7.6
Labour	Sylvia Hodrien	1,283	25.5	▲1.2
Liberal Democrats	Jane Otterson	402	8.0	▼10.6
Green	Yvonne McGinley	349	6.9	▲1.7
UKIP	Frank Whitham	141	2.8	▲0.2
Majority		1,583	31.4	▲6.4
Registered electors		10,397		
Turnout			48.8	▼24.5
Conservative hold		Swing	▲3.2	

=== Leasowe and Moreton East ===
Leasowe and Moreton East
Party	Candidate	Votes	%	±%
Labour	Ron Abbey	2,442	55.4	▲3.5
Conservative	Steven Smith	1,564	35.5	▲5.8
UKIP	Russell Jones	149	3.4	▲0.1
Green	Jackie Smith	143	3.2	▲1.2
Liberal Democrats	Gerald Hainsworth	111	2.5	▼10.7
Majority		878	19.9	▼2.3
Registered electors		10,629		
Turnout			41.8	▼18.9
Labour hold		Swing	▼1.2	

=== Liscard ===
Liscard
Party	Candidate	Votes	%	±%
Labour	Bernie Mooney	2,523	54.1	▲7.3
Conservative	Karen Hayes	1,673	35.8	▼0.2
UKIP	Lynda Williams	204	4.4	▲0.9
Green	Kenny Peers	146	3.1	▼0.3
Liberal Democrats	Daniel Clein	121	2.6	▼7.8
Majority		850	18.3	▲7.5
Registered electors		11,082		
Turnout			42.3	▼20.8
Labour gain from Conservative		Swing	▲3.8	

=== Moreton West and Saughall Massie ===
Moreton West and Saughall Massie
Party	Candidate	Votes	%	±%
Conservative	Steve Williams	2,246	50.5	▲9.0
Labour	Karl Greaney	1,768	39.7	▲3.0
UKIP	Susan Whitham	198	4.4	▲1.1
Liberal Democrats	Eric Copestake	144	3.2	▼10.6
Green	Perle Sheldricks	94	2.1	▲0.5
Majority		478	10.8	▲6.0
Registered electors		10,724		
Turnout			41.7	▼25.0
Conservative hold		Swing	▲3.0	

=== New Brighton ===
New Brighton
Party	Candidate	Votes	%	±%
Labour	Pat Hackett	2,283	49.6	▲5.6
Conservative	Tony Pritchard	1,621	35.2	▲4.0
Green	Cynthia Stonall	264	5.7	▲0.8
UKIP	Bill Duffey	254	5.5	▲2.3
Liberal Democrats	Julia Codling	177	3.8	▼12.9
Majority		662	14.4	▲1.6
Registered electors		10,825		
Turnout			42.8	▼20.8
Labour gain from Conservative		Swing	▲0.8	

=== Oxton ===
Oxton
Party	Candidate	Votes	%	±%
Liberal Democrats	Stuart Kelly	1,918	39.8	▼0.7
Labour	Matthew Patrick	1,792	37.2	▲5.4
Conservative	Tina McDonnell	655	13.6	▼6.0
UKIP	Catherine Williams	234	4.9	▲0.7
Green	Garnette Bowler	222	4.6	▲0.8
Majority		126	2.6	▼6.1
Registered electors		11,108		
Turnout			43.6	▼21.5
Liberal Democrats hold		Swing	▼3.1	

=== Pensby and Thingwall ===
Pensby and Thingwall
Party	Candidate	Votes	%	±%
Conservative	Don McCubbin	1,881	36.9	▲5.8
Labour	Michael Sullivan	1,636	32.1	▲11.1
Liberal Democrats	Damien Cummins	1,209	23.7	▼12.1
UKIP	Oliver Sayle-Adam	196	3.8	▼2.7
Green	Allen Burton	180	3.5	▼2.1
Majority		245	4.8	N/A
Registered electors		10,493		
Turnout			48.8	▼22.7
Conservative hold		Swing	▲4.8	

=== Prenton ===
Prenton
Party	Candidate	Votes	%	±%
Labour	Paul Doughty	2,376	51.2	▲11.6
Liberal Democrats	Simon Holbrook	1,219	26.3	▼5.3
Conservative	Cyrus Ferguson	662	14.3	▼4.1
UKIP	James Bradshaw	238	5.1	▼0.1
Green	Mark Mitchell	146	3.1	▲1.0
Majority		1,157	24.9	▲16.9
Registered electors		10,820		
Turnout			43.1	▼21.8
Labour gain from Liberal Democrats		Swing	▲8.5	

=== Rock Ferry ===
Rock Ferry
Party	Candidate	Votes	%	±%
Labour	Chris Meaden	2,129	71.3	▲11.6
Conservative	Barbara Poole	369	12.4	▼1.8
UKIP	Ann Flynn	225	7.5	New
Liberal Democrats	Peter Heppinstall	164	5.5	▼10.7
Green	Joy Hogg	100	3.3	Steady
Majority		1,760	58.9	▲15.4
Registered electors		9,630		
Turnout			31.2	▼19.4
Labour hold		Swing	▲7.7	

=== Seacombe ===
Seacombe
Party	Candidate	Votes	%	±%
Labour	Chris Jones	2,111	64.4	▲1.6
Conservative	Denis Knowles	677	20.6	▲3.4
UKIP	Christopher Wellstead	286	8.7	▲4.2
Green	Timothy Denton	104	3.2	▲1.2
Liberal Democrats	Steve Pitt	101	3.1	▼10.5
Majority		1,434	43.8	▼1.8
Registered electors		10,482		
Turnout			31.5	▼20.9
Labour gain from Conservative		Swing	▼0.9	

=== Upton ===
Upton
Party	Candidate	Votes	%	±%
Labour	Tony Smith	2,850	57.6	▲7.4
Conservative	Geoff Gubb	1,495	30.2	▲2.1
Liberal Democrats	Alan Davies	226	4.6	▼13.4
UKIP	Emma Sayle-Adam	221	4.5	New
Green	Lesley Hussenbux	158	3.2	▼0.6
Majority		1,355	27.4	▲5.3
Registered electors		12,087		
Turnout			41.1	▼21.8
Labour hold		Swing	▲2.7	

=== Wallasey ===
Wallasey
Party	Candidate	Votes	%	±%
Conservative	Paul Hayes	2,670	49.2	▲6.4
Labour	Phil Mount	2,030	37.4	▲1.0
Liberal Democrats	John Codling	258	4.8	▼10.2
UKIP	Ian Watson	236	4.4	▲1.4
Green	James Brady	230	4.2	▲1.4
Majority		640	11.8	▲5.4
Registered electors		11,873		
Turnout			45.9	▼25.0
Conservative hold		Swing	▲2.7	

=== West Kirby and Thurstaston ===
West Kirby and Thurstaston
Party	Candidate	Votes	%	±%
Conservative	David Elderton	2,820	53.0	▲1.3
Labour	Tony Norbury	1,358	25.5	▲4.5
Liberal Democrats	John Cresswell	483	9.1	▼11.6
Green	Shirley Johnson	279	5.2	▲1.5
UKIP	George Robinson	223	4.2	▲1.3
Independent	Charles Barnes	154	2.9	New
Majority		1,462	27.5	▼3.2
Registered electors		10,343		
Turnout			51.7	▼23.7
Conservative hold		Swing	▼1.6	

== Changes between 2011 and 2012 ==
Date	Ward	Name	Previous affiliation	New affiliation	Circumstance
16 May 2011	Bromborough	Steve Niblock	Liberal Democrats	Labour	Defected.
