= Wirral Metropolitan Borough Council elections =

Local government elections in Merseyside, England

Wirral Metropolitan Borough Council elections are held every four years from 2023 onwards, having previously been held three years out of every four for a third of the council at a time. Wirral Metropolitan Borough Council, generally known as Wirral Council, is the local authority for the metropolitan borough of Wirral in Merseyside, England.

== Results ==
Only four parties have won seats to Council: Conservative, Green, Labour and Liberal Democrat (and its predecessors). All other political representation has come via changes in affiliation.

Year	Con	Green	Lab	Lib Dem	Other	Ref
1973	29	0	24	13	0	
1974	29	0	24	13	0	
1975	36	0	21	9	0	
1975	37	0	21	8	0	
1976	42	0	18	6	0	
1977	42	0	18	6	0	
1978	45	0	16	5	0	
1979	40	0	20	6	0	
1980	37	0	23	6	0	
1981	37	0	23	6	0	
1982	35	0	25	6	0	
1983	34	0	24	8	0	
1984	34	0	24	8	0	
1985	34	0	24	8	0	
1986	30	0	26	10	0	
1987	29	0	27	10	0	
1988	24	0	32	10	0	
1988	24	0	29	10	3	
1989	24	0	29	10	3	
1990	23	0	33	7	3	
1990	23	0	33	8	2	
1991	24	0	34	7	1	
1992	29	0	31	6	0	
1993	29	0	31	6	0	
1994	30	0	30	6	0	
1994	28	0	30	8	0	
1995	22	0	36	8	0	
1996	16	0	41	9	0	
1997	16	0	41	9	0	
1998	16	0	41	8	1	
1998	16	0	42	8	0	
1999	17	0	39	10	0	
2000	20	0	34	12	0	
2001	20	0	34	12	0	
2001	20	0	33	12	1	
2002	20	0	32	12	2	
2002	20	0	31	14	1	
2003	23	0	26	16	1	
2004	21	0	26	19	0	
2004	20	0	26	19	1	
2005	21	0	26	18	1	
2006	21	0	26	19	0	
2007	21	0	25	20	0	
2007	21	0	25	19	1	
2007	20	0	25	19	2	
2008	24	0	21	20	1	
2009	25	0	20	20	1	
2010	27	0	24	15	0	
2011	27	0	29	10	0	
2011	27	0	30	9	0	
2012	22	0	37	7	0	
2013	23	0	36	7	0	
2013	22	0	37	7	0	
2013	22	0	37	6	1	
2014	21	1	38	6	0	
2015	21	1	39	5	0	
2016	21	1	38	5	1	
2016	21	1	39	5	0	
2017	21	1	39	5	0	
2018	21	1	39	5	0	
2018	21	1	38	5	1	
2018	21	1	37	5	2	
2019	21	1	36	5	3	
2019	21	1	35	5	4	
2019	21	1	34	5	5	
2019	22	3	32	6	3	
2020	22	2	32	6	4	
2021	23	5	30	6	2	
2021	23	5	29	6	3	
2022	23	5	28	6	4	
2022	23	6	28	6	3	
2022	24	9	26	6	1	
2023	23	9	26	6	2	
2023	23	9	25	6	3	
2023	23	9	24	6	4	
2023	23	9	23	6	5	
2023	17	13	30	6	0	
2024	17	14	29	6	0	
2025	14	14	29	6	3	

== Council elections ==
Since the first election in 1973, boundary changes have occurred in 1980 (where a third of the council were up for election) and in 2004 (where there was an all out election). Following changes in 2023, Wirral moved from a thirds system of election to an all-out system, with all councillors elected every four years.

- 1973 Wirral Metropolitan Borough Council election
- 1975 Wirral Metropolitan Borough Council election
- 1976 Wirral Metropolitan Borough Council election
- 1978 Wirral Metropolitan Borough Council election
- 1979 Wirral Metropolitan Borough Council election
- 1980 Wirral Metropolitan Borough Council election
- 1982 Wirral Metropolitan Borough Council election
- 1983 Wirral Metropolitan Borough Council election
- 1984 Wirral Metropolitan Borough Council election
- 1986 Wirral Metropolitan Borough Council election
- 1987 Wirral Metropolitan Borough Council election
- 1988 Wirral Metropolitan Borough Council election
- 1990 Wirral Metropolitan Borough Council election
- 1991 Wirral Metropolitan Borough Council election
- 1992 Wirral Metropolitan Borough Council election
- 1994 Wirral Metropolitan Borough Council election
- 1995 Wirral Metropolitan Borough Council election
- 1996 Wirral Metropolitan Borough Council election
- 1998 Wirral Metropolitan Borough Council election
- 1999 Wirral Metropolitan Borough Council election
- 2000 Wirral Metropolitan Borough Council election
- 2002 Wirral Metropolitan Borough Council election
- 2003 Wirral Metropolitan Borough Council election
- 2004 Wirral Metropolitan Borough Council election
- 2006 Wirral Metropolitan Borough Council election
- 2007 Wirral Metropolitan Borough Council election
- 2008 Wirral Metropolitan Borough Council election
- 2010 Wirral Metropolitan Borough Council election
- 2011 Wirral Metropolitan Borough Council election
- 2012 Wirral Metropolitan Borough Council election
- 2014 Wirral Metropolitan Borough Council election
- 2015 Wirral Metropolitan Borough Council election
- 2016 Wirral Metropolitan Borough Council election
- 2018 Wirral Metropolitan Borough Council election
- 2019 Wirral Metropolitan Borough Council election
- 2021 Wirral Metropolitan Borough Council election
- 2022 Wirral Metropolitan Borough Council election
- 2023 Wirral Metropolitan Borough Council election

== Borough result maps ==
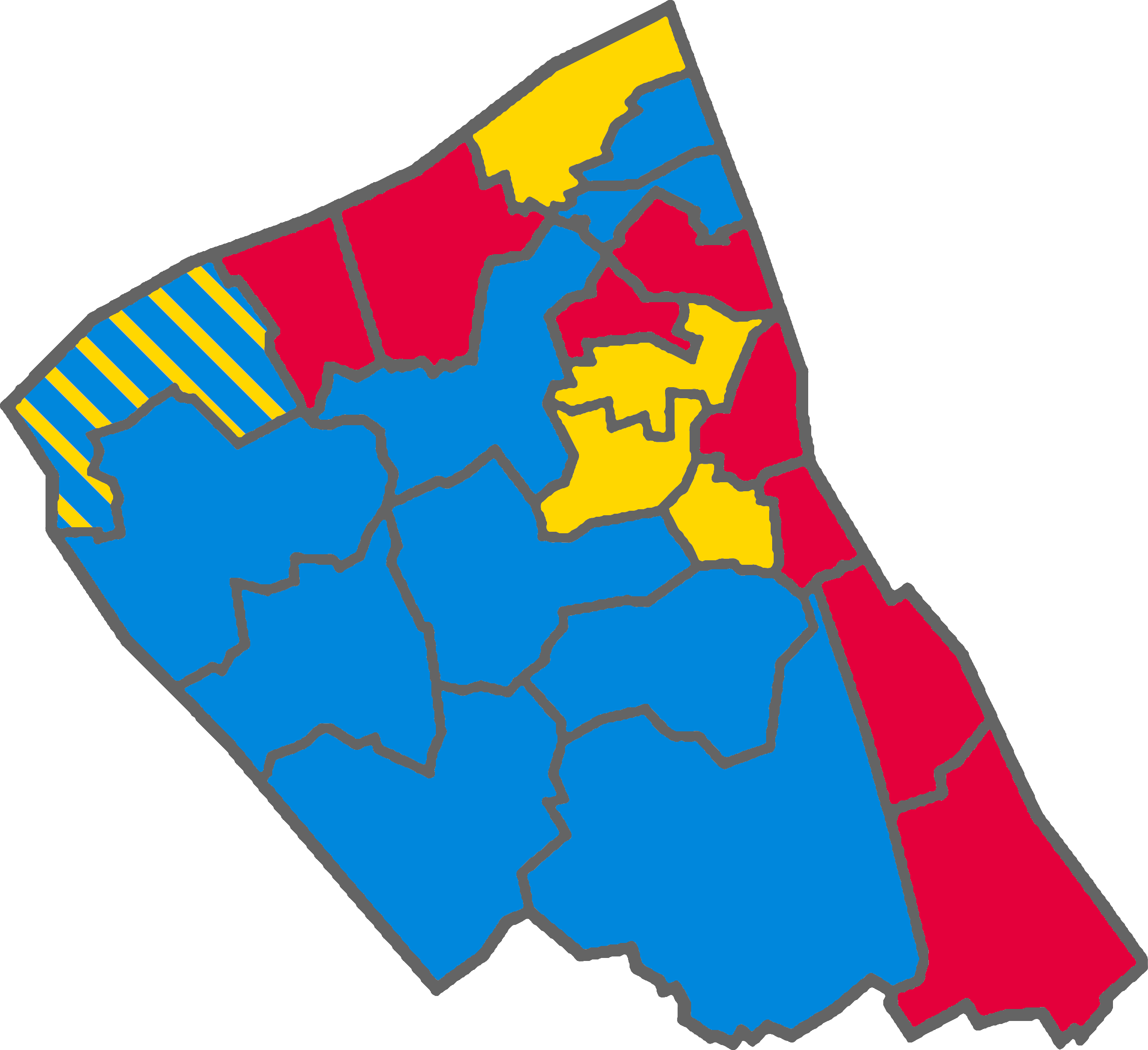
1973 results map

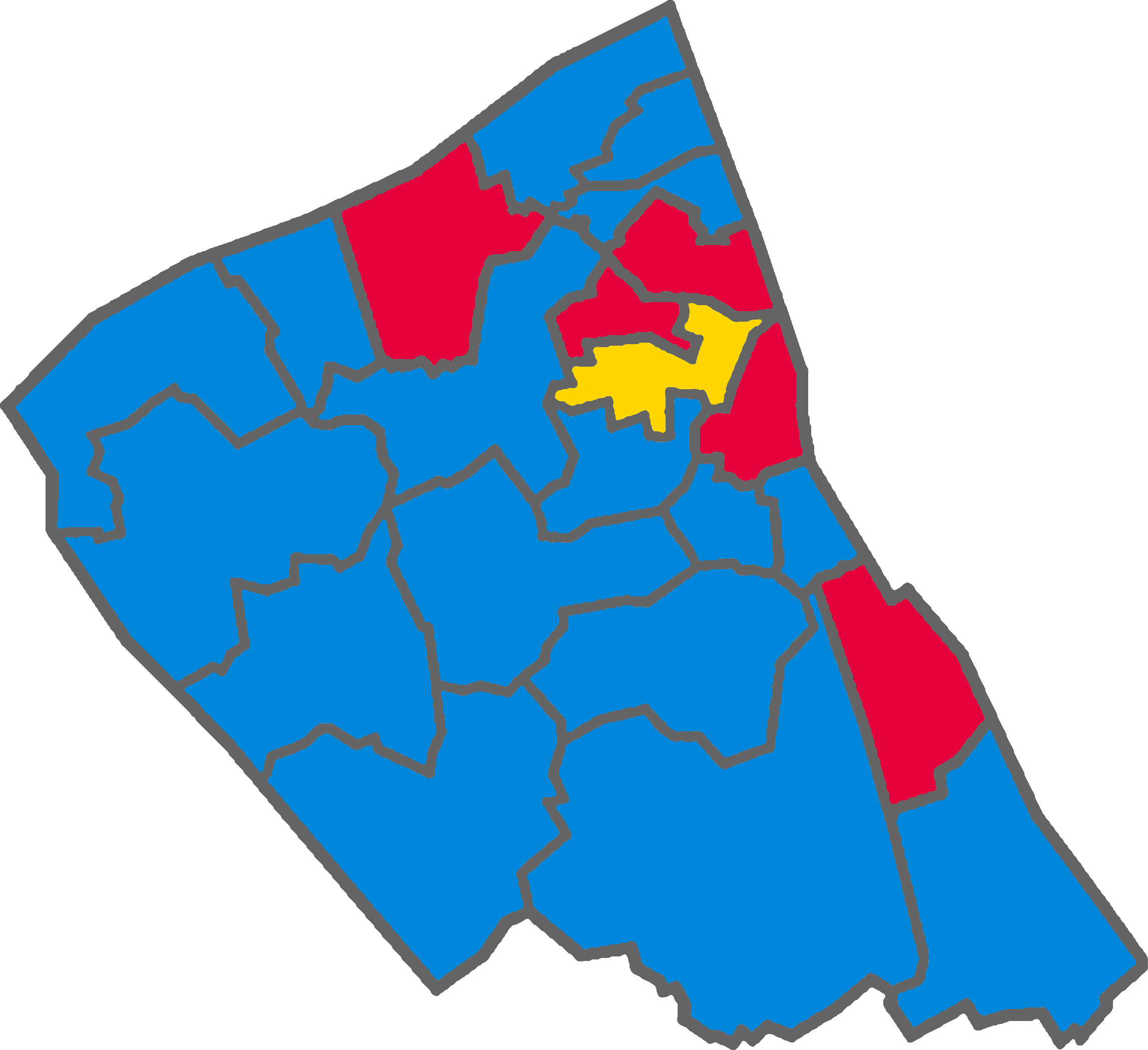
1975 results map

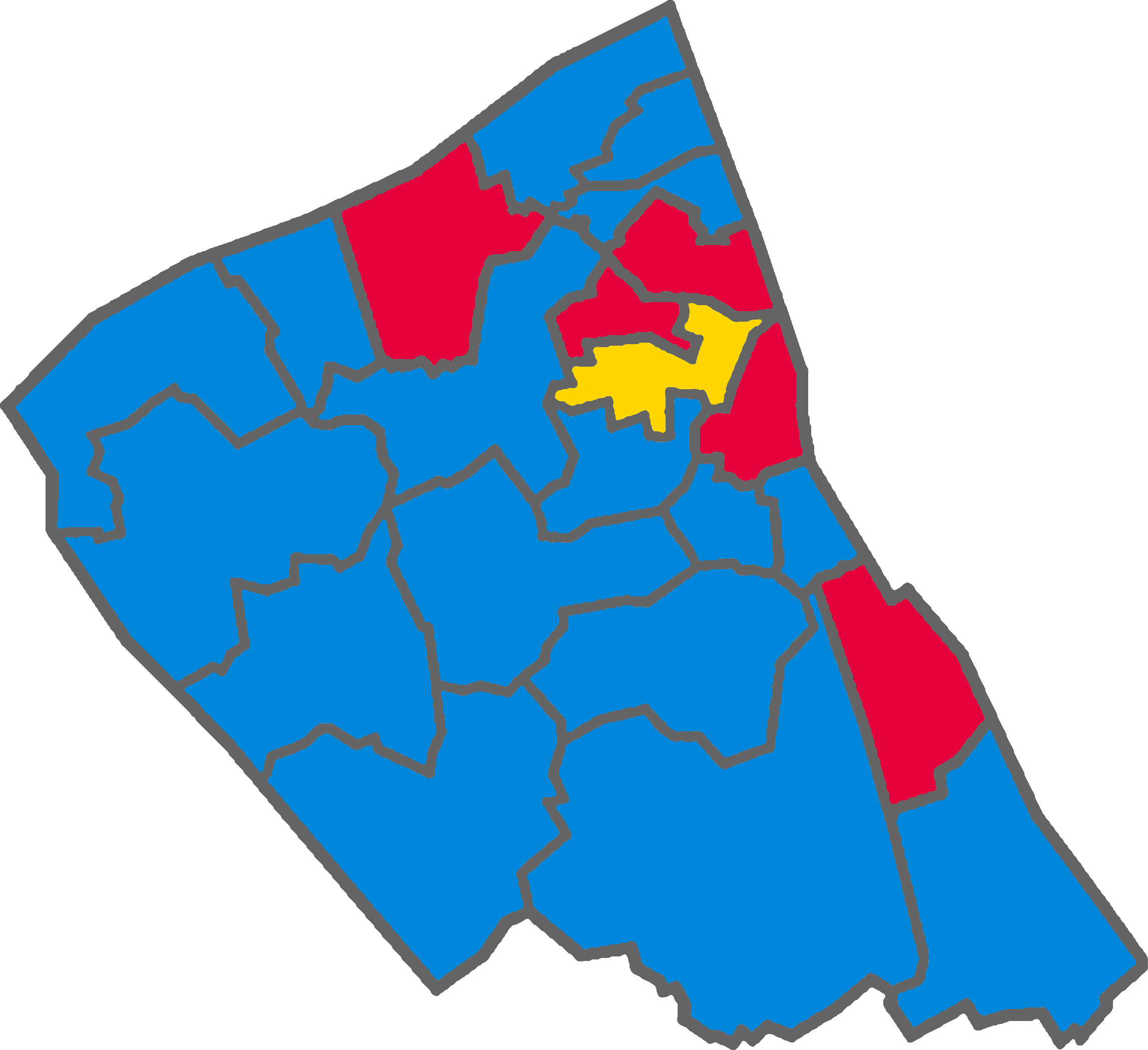
1976 results map

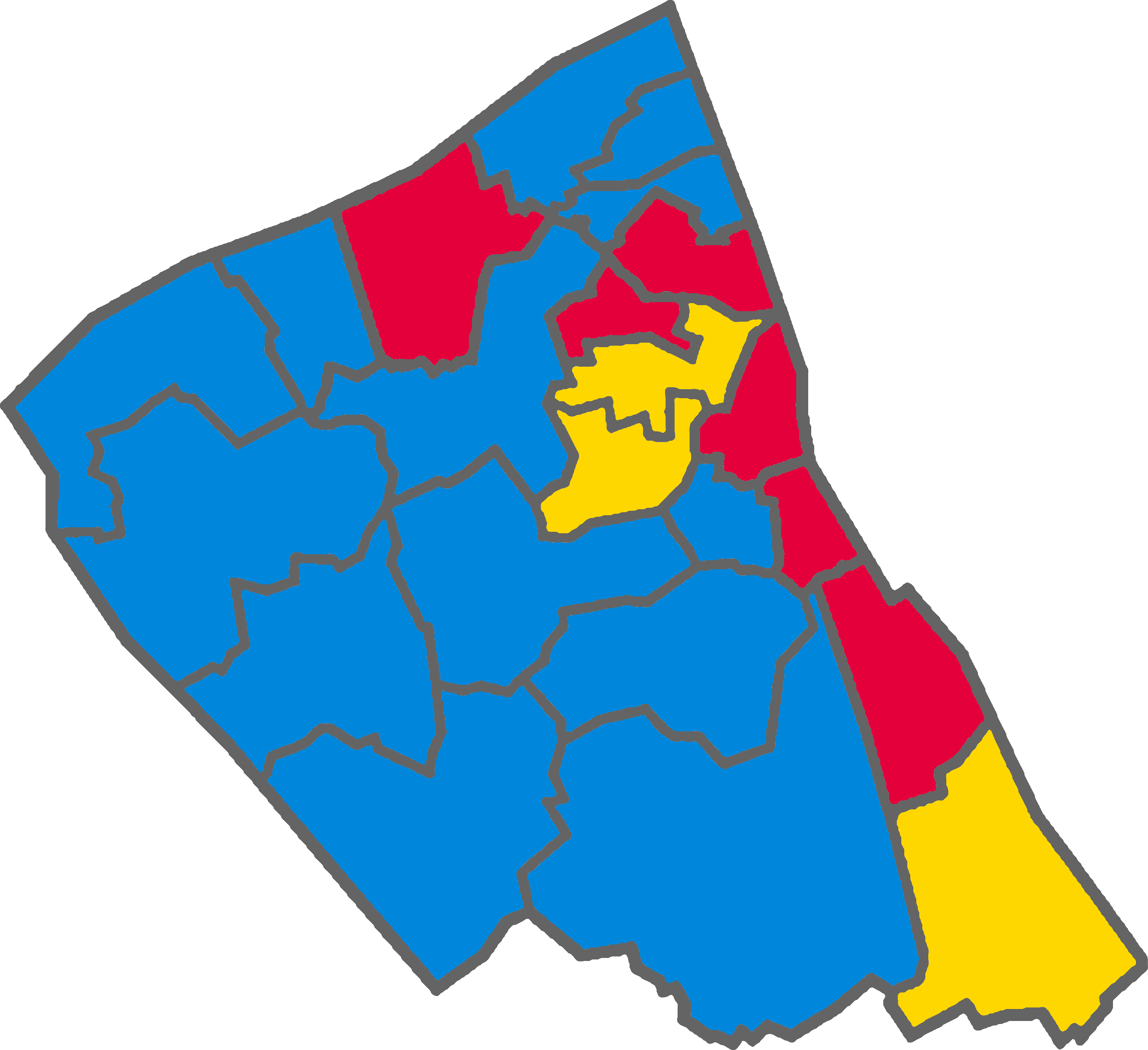
1978 results map

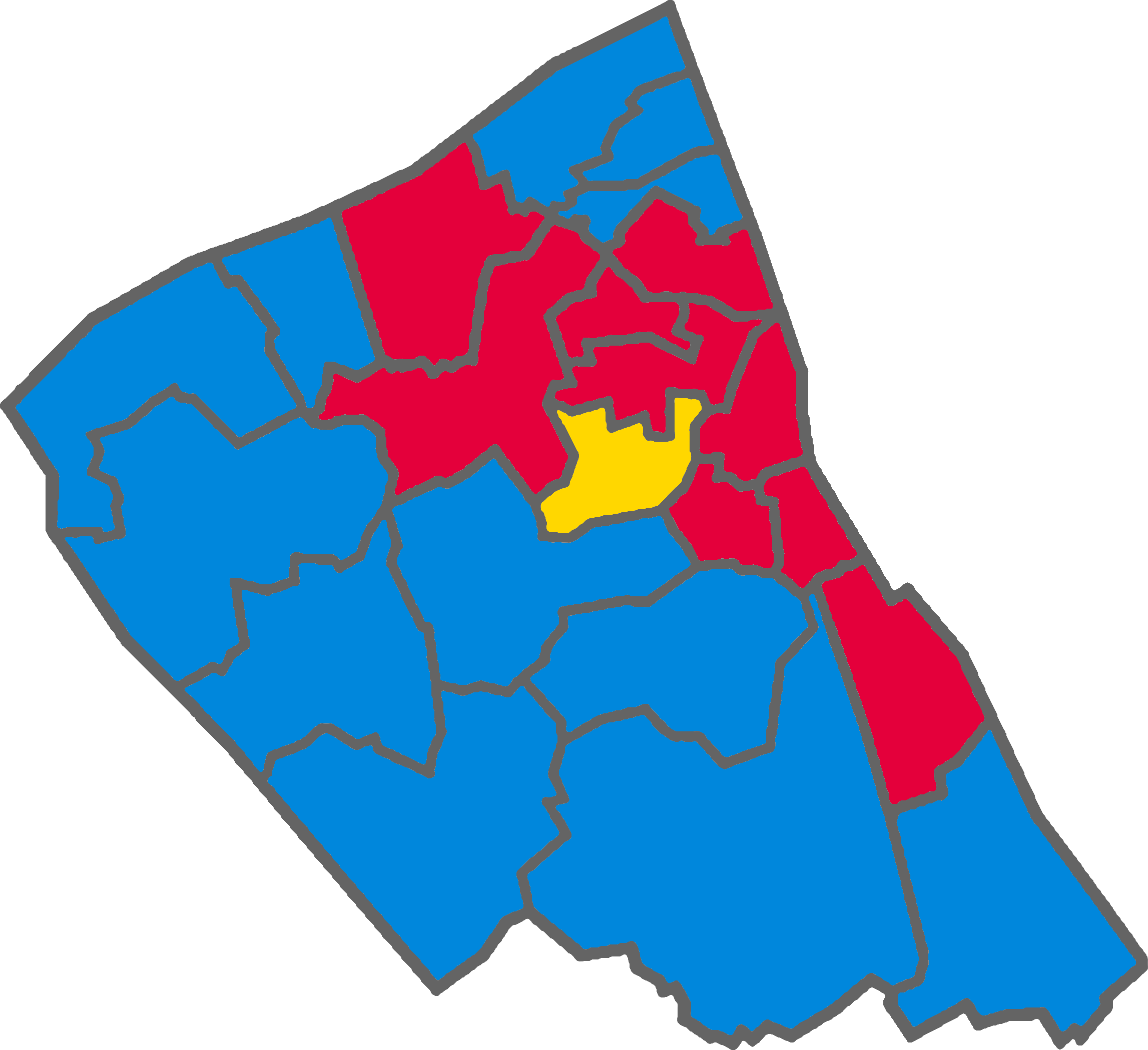
1979 results map

1980 results map

1982 results map

1983 results map

1984 results map

1986 results map

1987 results map

1988 results map

1990 results map

1991 results map

1992 results map

1994 results map

1995 results map

1996 results map

1998 results map

1999 results map

2000 results map

2002 results map

2003 results map

2004 results map

2006 results map

2007 results map

2008 results map

2010 results map

2011 results map

2012 results map

2014 results map

2015 results map

2016 results map

2018 results map

2019 results map

2021 results map

2022 results map

2023 results map

== Changes between election ==
=== 1979–2004 boundaries ===
==== Wallasey by-election 1997 ====
By-election, 13 March 1997: Wallasey
Party	Candidate	Votes	%	±%
Conservative	Lesley Rennie	1,781	47.3	▼3.1
Labour	Elizabeth McArdle	1,490	39.5	▲1.3
Liberal Democrats	John Uriel	443	11.8	▲0.4
Green	George Bowler	54	1.4	New
Majority		291	7.7	▼4.5
Turnout			32.2	▼8.9
Conservative hold		Swing	▼2.2	

==== Prenton by-election 2003 ====
By-election, 6 February 2003: Prenton
Party	Candidate	Votes	%	±%
Liberal Democrats	Francis Doyle	1,764	63.3	▲9.9
Conservative	Ian McKellar	634	22.7	▲0.9
Labour	Gerard Allen	389	14.0	▼10.8
Majority		1,130	40.6	▲12.0
Registered electors		11,596		
Turnout			24.0	▼10.8
Liberal Democrats hold		Swing	▲6.0	

=== 2004–present boundaries ===
==== Moreton West and Saughall Massie by-election 2009 ====
By-election, 26 November 2009: Moreton West and Saughall Massie
Party	Candidate	Votes	%	±%
Conservative	Steve Williams	2,255	70.1	▼1.0
Labour	Andrew Hollingworth	615	19.1	▲2.8
Liberal Democrats	Steve Pitt	134	4.2	▼1.5
Independent	Alec McFadden	121	3.8	New
Green	Jim McGinley	92	2.9	▼0.4
Majority		1,640	51.0	▼3.8
Turnout			28.0	▼9.9
Conservative hold		Swing	▼1.9	

==== Leasowe and Moreton East by-election 2013 ====
By-election, 17 January 2013: Leasowe and Moreton East
Party	Candidate	Votes	%	±%
Conservative	Ian Lewis	1,620	50.5	▲7.2
Labour	Pauline Daniels	1,355	42.2	▼8.8
UKIP	Susan Whitham	148	4.6	▲1.1
TUSC	Mark Halligan	31	1.0	New
Liberal Democrats	Daniel Clein	28	0.9	New
Green	Jim McGinley	28	0.9	▼1.3
Majority		265	8.3	N/A
Registered electors		10,551		
Turnout			30.5	▼8.8
Conservative gain from Labour		Swing	▲8.0	

==== Heswall by-election 2013 ====
By-election, 17 January 2013: Heswall
Party	Candidate	Votes	%	±%
Conservative	Kathryn Hodson	1,254	58.8	▼3.9
UKIP	David Scott	460	21.6	▲12.2
Labour	Mike Holliday	289	13.6	−4.2
Green	Barbara Burton	110	5.2	▼0.7
TUSC	Greg North	19	0.9	New
Majority		794	37.2	▼7.7
Registered electors		10,855		
Turnout			19.7	▼20.8
Conservative hold		Swing	▼3.9	

==== Pensby and Thingwall by-election 2013 ====
By-election, 28 February 2013: Pensby and Thingwall
Party	Candidate	Votes	%	±%
Labour	Phillip Brightmore	1,411	38.5	▲5.7
Conservative	Sheila Clarke	868	23.7	▼4.7
Liberal Democrats	Damien Cummins	834	22.7	▼2.5
UKIP	Jan Davison	426	11.6	▲2.4
Green	Allen Burton	74	2.0	▼2.4
English Democrat	Neil Kenny	53	1.4	New
Majority		543	14.8	▲10.4
Registered electors		10,487		
Turnout			35.0	▼6.1
Labour gain from Conservative		Swing	▲5.2	

==== Upton by-election 2013 ====
By-election, 24 October 2013: Upton
Party	Candidate	Votes	%	±%
Labour	Matthew Patrick	1,954	65.4	▲5.8
Conservative	Geoffrey Gubb	762	25.5	▲2.9
Green	Jim McGinley	143	4.8	▼0.1
Liberal Democrats	Alan Davies	130	4.3	▲0.4
Majority		1,192	39.9	▲2.9
Registered electors		12,154		
Turnout		3,031	24.9	▼9.7
Rejected ballots		21	0.7	
Labour hold		Swing	▲1.5	

==== Claughton by-election 2017 ====
By-election, 4 May 2017: Claughton
Party	Candidate	Votes	%	±%
Labour	Gillian Wood	1,761	52.4	▼14.2
Liberal Democrats	David Evans	740	22.0	▲15.3
Conservative	Barbara Sinclair	567	16.9	▼1.0
Green	Liz Heydon	136	4.1	▼2.2
UK_Independence_Party	Beryl Jones	130	3.9	New
TUSC	Leon Wheddon	27	0.8	▼1.7
Majority		976	30.4	▼18.3
Registered electors		11,336		
Turnout		3,372	29.7	▼1.9
Rejected ballots		11	0.3	▼0.3
Labour hold		Swing	▼20.4	

==== Bromborough by-election 2018 ====
By-election, 23 August 2018: Bromborough
Party	Candidate	Votes	%	±%
Labour Co-op	Jo Bird	1,253	47.1	▼14.0
Conservative	Des Drury	749	28.1	▲6.0
Liberal Democrats	Vicky Downie	454	17.1	▲6.0
Independent	Steve Niblock	147	5.5	New
Green	Susan Braddock	59	2.2	▼3.5
Majority		504	19.0	▼20.0
Registered electors		11,760		
Turnout		2664	22.7	▼6.9
Rejected ballots		2	0.1	▼0.2
Labour hold		Swing	▼10.0	

==== Upton by-election 2018 ====
By-election, 22 November 2018: Upton
Party	Candidate	Votes	%	±%
Labour	Jean Robinson	1,490	61.3	▲3.1
Conservative	Emma Sellman	705	29.0	▲0.4
Green	Lily Clough	151	6.2	▼0.5
Liberal Democrats	Alan Davies	83	3.4	▼0.8
Majority		785	32.3	▲2.7
Registered electors		12,040		
Turnout		2,434	20.2	▼11.4
Rejected ballots		5	0.2	▼0.1
Labour hold		Swing	▲1.4	

==== Liscard by-election 2021 ====
By-election, 22 July 2021: Liscard
Party	Candidate	Votes	%	±%
Labour	Daisy Kenny	1,137	53.6	▼3.3
Conservative	Jane Owens	582	27.4	▲1.2
Liberal Democrats	Sue Arrowsmith	201	9.5	▲2.9
Green	Edward Lamb	109	5.1	▼3.0
Independent	Lynda Williams	68	3.2	New
For Britain	Gary Bergin	26	1.2	New
Majority		555	26.1	▼4.6
Registered electors		11,399		
Turnout		2,128	18.7	▼10.9
Rejected ballots		5	0.2	▼1.0
Labour hold		Swing	▼2.3	

==== Oxton by-election 2021 ====
By-election, 25 November 2021: Oxton
Party	Candidate	Votes	%	±%
Liberal Democrats	Orod Osanlou	1,666	68.3	▲11.3
Labour Co-op	Sue Mahoney	460	18.8	▼7.1
Conservative	Philip Merry	168	6.9	▼1.2
Green	Mary Heydon	147	6.0	▼1.5
Majority		1,206	49.4	▲18.3
Registered electors		10,795		
Turnout		22.7	2,447	▼14.5
Rejected ballots		6	0.2	▼0.9
Liberal Democrats hold		Swing	▲9.2	

==== Liscard by-election 2022 ====
By-election, 14 July 2022: Liscard
Party	Candidate	Votes	%	±%
Labour	James Laing	1,304	64.8	Steady
Conservative	Jane Owens	370	18.4	▼1.4
Green	Nadia Parson	172	8.5	▼1.8
Liberal Democrats	Sue Arrowsmith	167	8.3	▲3.2
Majority		934	46.4	▲1.4
Registered electors		10,795		
Turnout		2,027	18.8	▼10.8
Rejected ballots		14	0.7	▲0.1
Labour hold		Swing	▲0.7	

==== Liscard by-election 2024 ====
By-election, 4 July 2024: Liscard
Party	Candidate	Votes	%	±%
Labour	Graeme Cooper	3,630	59.6	
Green	Oliver Reeves	909	14.9	
Conservative	Stephen Dobson	751	12.3	
Liberal Democrats	Chase Newton	321	5.3	
Workers Party	Philip Bimpson	300	4.9	
Freedom Alliance	Kieran Folkard	178	2.9	
Majority		2,721	44.7	
Turnout		6,089		
Labour hold		Swing		

== Changes in affiliation ==
Previous election	Date	Ward	Name	Previous affiliation	New affiliation	Circumstance
1975	September 1975	New Brighton-Wallasey-Warren	Kate Wood	Liberal	Conservative	Defected.
1988	October 1988	Egerton	Alec Dunn	Labour	Independent Labour	Expelled.
1988	October 1988	Leasowe	Jim Edwards	Labour	Independent Labour	Expelled.
1988	October 1988	Leasowe	Ken Fox	Labour	Independent Labour	Expelled.
1990	?	Egerton	Alec Dunn	Independent Labour	Liberal Democrats	Defected.
1992	March 1994	Eastham	Vera Ruck	Labour	Conservative	Defected.
1996	?	Prenton	Ed Cunniffe	Liberal Democrats	Ind. Lib Dem	Resigned.
1998	June 1998	Prenton	Ed Cunniffe	Ind. Lib Dem	Labour	Defected.
2000	December 2001	Egerton	Colin Dow	Labour	Independent (Note: Later forming the Wirral Independent Network.)	Whip removed.
2000	February 2002	Bebington	Kath Shaughnessy	Labour	Independent	Resigned.
2004	November 2004	Hoylake and Meols	Hilary Jones	Conservative	Independent	Resigned.
2004	April 2005	Pensby and Thingwall	Oliver Adam	Liberal Democrats	Conservative	Defected.
2004	?	Hoylake and Meols	Hilary Jones	Independent	UKIP	Defected.
2007	May 2007	Clatterbridge	Isabel Moon	Liberal Democrats	Ind. Lib Dem	Resigned.
2007	June 2007	Hoylake and Meols	David Kirwan	Conservative	Ind. Conservative	Resigned.
2008	18 May 2009	Seacombe	Denis Knowles	Labour	Conservative	Defected.
2011	16 May 2011	Bromborough	Steve Niblock	Liberal Democrats	Labour	Defected.
2012	30 April 2013	Pensby and Thingwall	Mark Johnston	Liberal Democrats	Independent	Resigned.
2015	?	Bromborough	Steve Niblock	Labour	Independent	Deselected.
2018	28 August 2018	Pensby and Thingwall	Mike Suillvan	Labour	Independent	Resigned.
2018	25 October 2018	Rock Ferry	Moira McLaughlin	Labour	Independent	Resigned.
2018	January 2019	Rock Ferry	Chris Meaden	Labour	Independent	Resigned.
2018	4 March 2019	Bromborough	Jo Bird	Labour Co-op	Independent	Suspended.
2018	14 March 2019	Bromborough	Jo Bird	Independent	Labour Co-op	Reinstated.
2018	18 March 2019	Rock Ferry	Bill Davies	Labour	Independent	Resigned.
2018	April 2019	Oxton	Paul Doughty	Labour	Independent	Suspended.
2019	17 July 2019	Greasby, Frankby and Irby	David Burgess-Joyce	Conservative	Independent	Suspended.
2019	6 February 2020	Bromborough	Jo Bird	Labour Co-op	Independent	Suspended.
2019	15 February 2020	Bromborough	Jo Bird	Independent	Labour Co-op	Reinstated.
2019	9 August 2020	Birkenhead and Tranmere	Steve Hayes	Green	Independent	Resigned.
2019	After 20 July 2020	Greasby, Frankby and Irby	David Burgess-Joyce	Independent	Conservative	Reinstated.
2019	14 November 2020	Hoylake and Meols	Tony Cox	Conservative	Independent	Suspended.
2019	December 2020	Prenton	Tony Norbury	Labour	Independent	Suspended.
2019	February 2021	Prenton	Tony Norbury	Independent	Labour	Reinstated.
2019	After November 2020	Hoylake and Meols	Tony Cox	Independent	Conservative	Reinstated.
2021	19 November 2021	Bromborough	Jo Bird	Labour Co-op	Independent	Expelled.
2021	February 2022	Leasowe and Moreton East	Karl Greaney	Labour	Independent	Resigned.
2021	22 March 2022	Bromborough	Jo Bird	Independent	Green	Defected.
2022	12 April 2023	Greasby, Frankby and Irby	David Burgess-Joyce	Conservative	Independent	Deselected and resigned to stand as an independent.
2022	17 April 2023	Rock Ferry	Yvonne Nolan	Labour	Independent	Deselected and resigned to stand as an independent.
2022	20 April 2023	Rock Ferry	Clare O'Hagan	Labour	Independent	Resigned.
2022	3 May 2023	Rock Ferry	Chris Davies	Labour	Independent	Deselected and resigned.
2023	January 2024	Greasby, Frankby and Irby	Gail Jenkinson	Labour	Green	Defected.
2023	9 May 2025	Heswall	Graham Davies	Conservative	Ind. Conservative	Resigned.
2023	9 May 2025	Heswall	Andrew Hodson	Conservative	Ind. Conservative	Resigned.
2023	9 May 2025	Heswall	Kathy Hodson	Conservative	Ind. Conservative	Resigned.
