= 2023 Wirral Metropolitan Borough Council election =

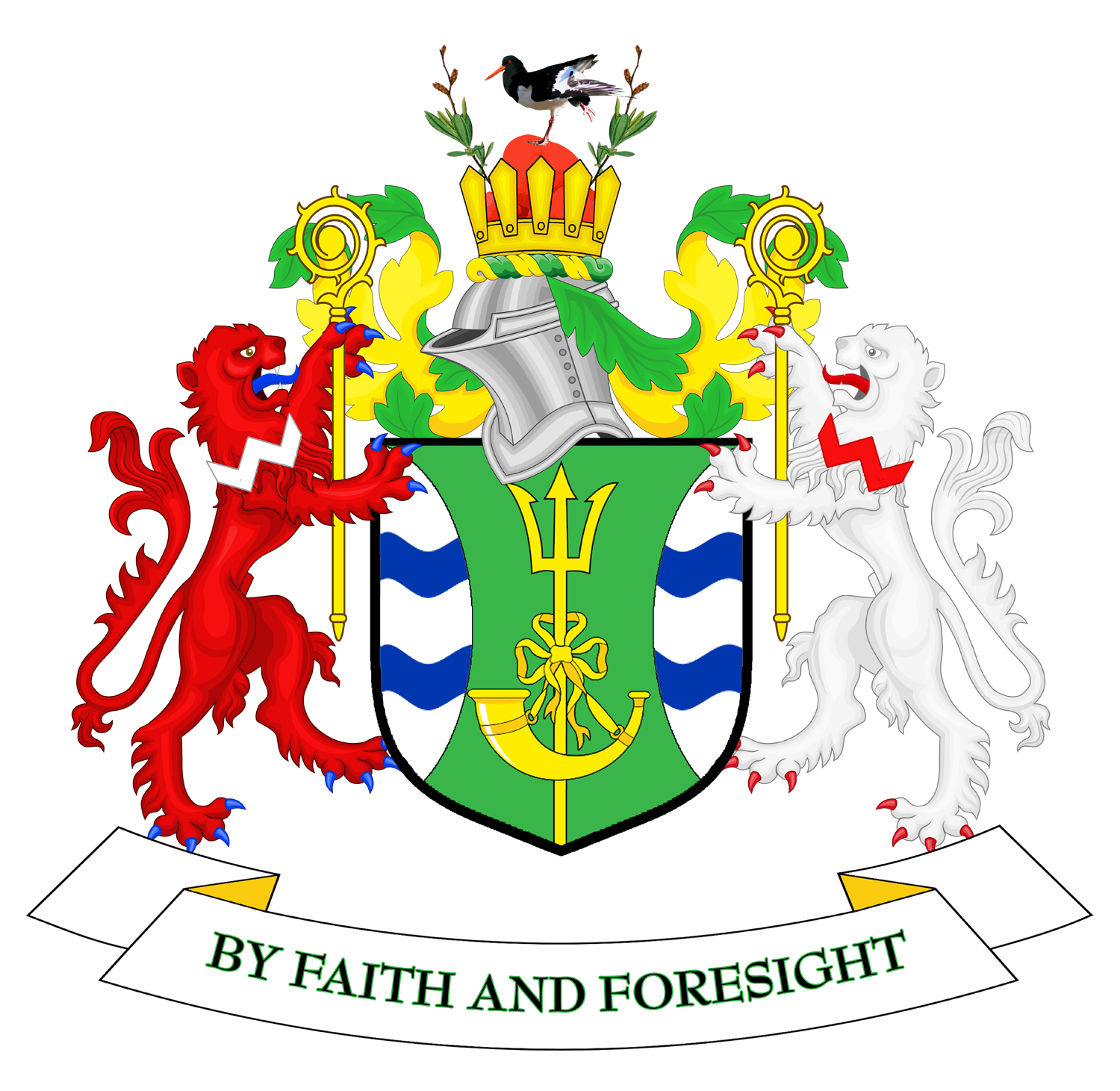
- 4 May 2023

All 66 seats to Wirral Council 34 seats needed for a majority
- Turnout: 36.0% (▲0.5%)
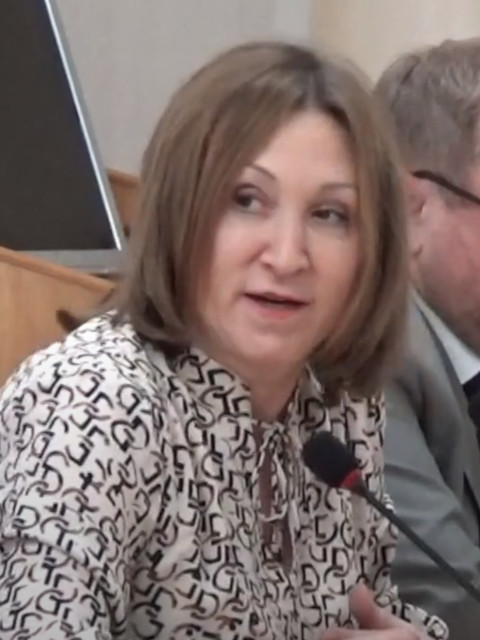

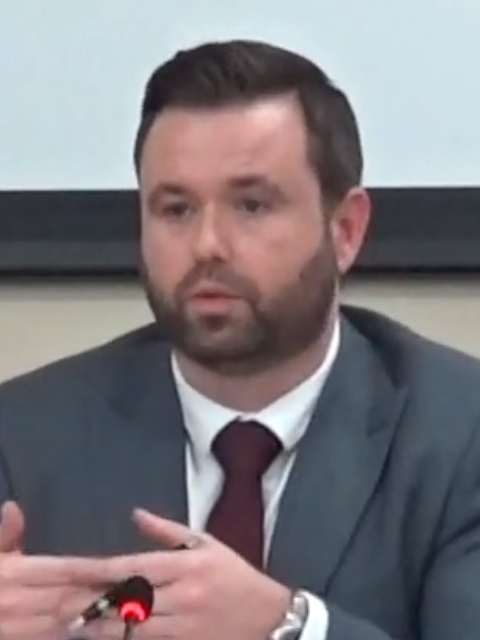

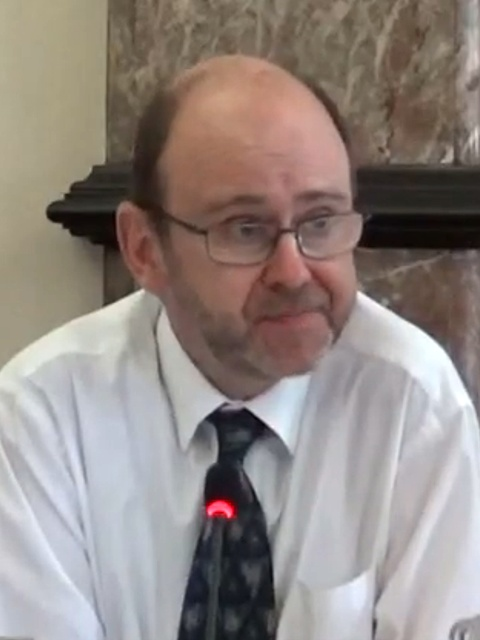

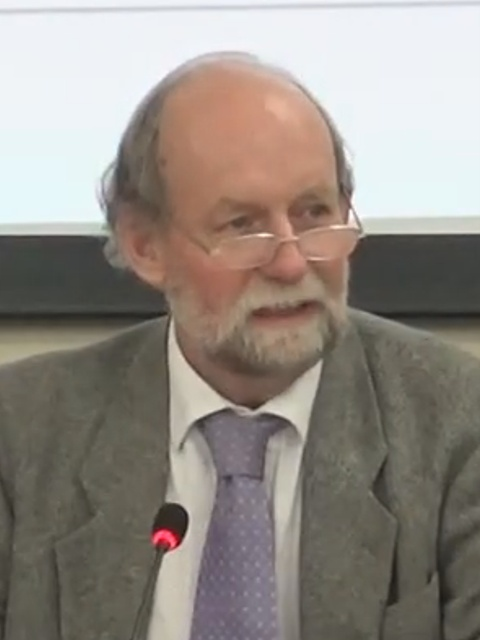
	First party	Second party
Leader	Janette Williamson	Tom Anderson
Party	Labour	Conservative
Leader since	29 June 2020	14 May 2021
Leader's seat	Liscard	Greasby; Frankby and Irby (retired)
Last election	9 seats, 42.7%	8 seats, 26.2%
Seats before	23 (Note: 28 excluding changes in affiliation.)	23 (Note: With one vacancy in Heswall. 24 excluding changes in affiliation.)
Seats won	30	17
Seat change	▲7	▼6
Popular vote	36,625	21,517
Percentage	38.9%	22.8%
Swing	▼3.8%	▼3.4%
	Third party	Fourth party
Leader	Pat Cleary	Phil Gilchrist
Party	Green	Liberal Democrats
Leader since	22 May 2014	16 May 2013
Leader's seat	Birkenhead and Tranmere	Eastham
Last election	3 seats, 17.4%	2 seats, 12.6%
Seats before	9 (Note: 8 excluding changes in affiliation.)	6
Seats won	13	6
Seat change	▲4	Steady
Popular vote	20,211	12,062
Percentage	21.4%	12.8%
Swing	▲4.0%	▲0.2%
- Map of results of 2023 election
Leader before election
Janette Williamson
Labour
No Overall Control
Leader after election
Paul Stuart
(Labour)
No Overall Control

The 2023 Wirral Metropolitan Borough Council election took place on 4 May 2023, electing members to Wirral Metropolitan Borough Council in England. This was the third election to the council where all councillors were up for election and the first in which the authority moves to a four-yearly, whole-council election system, following recommendations from a government report into the council's finances.

Prior to the election the council was under no overall control being led by a Labour minority administration. The council remained under no overall control after the election and Labour continued to form the largest party.

== Election results ==
=== Overall election result ===
Overall result compared with 2022.

Wirral Metropolitan Borough Council election result, 2023
Party	Candidates						Votes		
Party	Stood	Elected	Gained	Unseated	Net	% of total	%	No.	Net %
Labour	64	30	10 (7)	3 (5)	▲7 (▲2)	45.5	38.9	36,625	▼3.8
Conservative	66	17	0 (0)	6 (7)	▼6 (▼7)	25.8	22.8	21,517	▼3.4
Green	63	13	4 (5)	0 (0)	▲4 (▲5)	19.7	21.4	20,211	▲4.0
Liberal Democrats	34	6	0 (0)	0 (0)	Steady	9.1	12.8	12,062	▲0.2
Freedom Alliance	20	0	0 (0)	0 (0)	Steady	0.0	2.0	1,893	New
Independent	3	0	0 (0)	5 (0)	▼5	0.0	1.4	1,328	▲0.5
Reform	4	0	0 (0)	0 (0)	Steady	0.0	0.5	456	New
National Housing Party UK	1	0	0 (0)	0 (0)	Steady	0.0	0.2	149	New

=== Changes in council composition ===
Prior to the election the composition of the council was:

↓
23	22	9	6	5	1
Lab	Con	Grn	LD	I	V

They were originally elected as:

↓
28	24	8	6
Lab	Con	Grn	LD

After the election the composition of the council was:

↓
30	17	13	6
Lab	Con	Grn	LD

== Outgoing and moving councillors ==
=== Retiring councillors ===
Ward	Departing councillor	First elected	Party	Ref.
Birkenhead and Tranmere	Emily Gleaves	2021	Green	
Bromborough	Joe Walsh	2011	Labour	
Eastham	Dave Mitchell	1983	Liberal Democrats	
Greasby, Frankby and Irby	Tom Anderson	2008	Conservative	
Heswall	Paul Connolly	2022	Conservative (vacated seat on 28 November 2022)	
Hoylake and Meols	Alison Wright	2019	Conservative	
Moreton West and Saughall Massie	Steve Williams	2009	Conservative	
Oxton	Orod Osanlou	2021	Liberal Democrats	
Rock Ferry	Christopher Davies	2022	Labour (deselected)	
Rock Ferry	Claire O'Hagan	2021	Labour	
Upton	Tony Smith	1995	Labour	
Wallasey	Paul Hayes	2007	Conservative	

=== Councillors seeking re-election in other wards ===
Old ward	Moving councillor	First elected	Party	New ward	Ref.
Bebington	Jerry Williams	1996	Labour	Upton	
Leasowe and Moreton East	Helen Collinson	2021	Labour	Birkenhead and Tranmere	
Moreton West and Saughall Massie	Max Booth	2021	Conservative	Hoylake and Meols	

=== Councillors seeking re-election for a different party ===
Ward	Moving councillor	First elected	Old party	New party	Details
Bromborough	Jo Bird	2018	Labour	Green	Expelled from Labour Party in November 2021. Joined Green Party in March 2022.
Greasby, Frankby and Irby	David Burgess-Joyce	2015	Conservative	Independent	Deselected by his local Conservative Party in July 2022. Later became the party's candidate for Heswall before being barred from standing by the national party in late March.
Leasowe and Moreton East	Karl Greaney	2019	Labour	Independent	Resigned from Labour Party in February 2022.
Rock Ferry	Yvonne Nolan	1987	Labour	no description	Deselected by Labour Party after protesting the deselection of her partner and ward colleague Chris Davies in late March 2023. Withdrew as a Labour candidate and resubmitted nomination as an independent. Ward colleague Claire O'Hagan withdrew her own candidacy leaving only two Labour candidates in the historically safe Labour ward.

=== Former councillors standing for election ===
Ward	Former councillor	Term	Party	Ref.
Bidston and St James	Wendy Clements	Greasby Frankby and Irby (2010 to 2022)	Conservative	
Greasby, Frankby and Irby	Alan Brighouse	Oxton (2010 to 2018)	Liberal Democrats	
Moreton West and Saughall Massie	Christopher Teggin	Clatterbridge (2004 to 2010)	Liberal Democrats	
Oxton	Mike Redfern	Pensby and Thingwall (2006 to 2010)	Liberal Democrats	
Pensby and Thingwall	Mike Sullivan	Pensby and Thingwall (2012 to 2019)	Labour	
Rock Ferry	Frank Doyle	Prenton (2003 to 2010)	Liberal Democrats	
Seacombe	Sarah Spoor	Liscard (2019 to 2021)	Green (was Labour)	
West Kirby and Thurstaston	Peter Reisdorf	Royden, Greasby, Frankby and Irby (2000 to 2011)	Liberal Democrats	

== Candidates and Ward results ==
Bold indicated candidate was elected.

=== Bebington ===
Bebington (3 seats)
Party	Candidate	Votes	%	±%
**Green**	**Judith Grier**	**3,397**	**68.2**	
**Green**	**Ed Lamb**	**3,349**	**67.3**	
**Green**	**Jason Walsh**	**3,159**	**63.5**	
Labour	Kaitlyn Peterson	1,261	25.3	
Labour	Callum Stuart	1,138	22.9	
Labour	Robert Ward	1,040	20.9	
Conservative	Nicola Oakley	346	7.0	
Conservative	Barry Tunna	298	6.0	
Conservative	Christine Tunna	274	5.5	
Liberal Democrats	Anthony Molyneux	145	2.9	
Freedom Alliance	Catherine Williams	63	1.3	
Turnout		4,978	42	
Green **hold**		Swing		
Green **hold**		Swing		
Green **gain** from Labour		Swing		

=== Bidston and St James ===
Bidston and St James (3 seats)
Party	Candidate	Votes	%	±%
**Labour**	**Liz Grey**	**1,435**	**68.3**	
**Labour**	**Brian Kenny**	**1,336**	**63.6**	
**Labour**	**Julie McManus**	**1,283**	**61.0**	
Green	Jayne Clough	247	11.8	
Green	Millie Gorman	231	11.0	
Conservative	Tina McDonnell	215	10.2	
Green	Craig Fitzpatrick	210	10.0	
Conservative	Wendy Clements	202	9.6	
Conservative	Jonathon Goldsmith	201	9.6	
Liberal Democrats	Mike Parsons	125	5.9	
Freedom Alliance	Malcolm Davis	88	4.2	
Turnout		2,102	20	
Labour **hold**		Swing		
Labour **hold**		Swing		
Labour **hold**		Swing		

=== Birkenhead and Tranmere ===
Birkenhead and Tranmere (3 seats)
Party	Candidate	Votes	%	±%
**Green**	**Pat Cleary**	**1,856**	**65.2**	
**Green**	**Amanda Onwuemene**	**1,590**	**55.9**	
**Green**	**Ewan Tomeny**	**1,567**	**55.1**	
Labour	Helen Collinson	1,034	36.3	
Labour	Julienne McGeough	916	32.2	
Labour	Piara Miah	792	27.8	
Conservative	Richard Baker	82	2.9	
Freedom Alliance	Catherine Evans	75	2.6	
Conservative	Ada Lewis	68	2.4	
Liberal Democrats	Edward Smith	62	2.2	
Conservative	Colin Young	60	2.1	
Turnout		2,846	27	
Green **hold**		Swing		
Green **hold**		Swing		
Green **hold**		Swing		

=== Bromborough ===
Bromborough (3 seats)
Party	Candidate	Votes	%	±%
**Green**	**Jo Bird**	**2,497**	**57.3**	
**Green**	**Ruth Molyneux**	**2,133**	**48.9**	
**Green**	**Keiran Murphy**	**1,994**	**45.7**	
Labour	Brenda Ashton	1,700	39.0	
Labour	Sue Percy	1,533	35.2	
Labour	Finlay Gordon	1,531	35.1	
Conservative	Des Drury	313	7.2	
Conservative	Gillian Byrne	258	5.9	
Conservative	Eleanor Johnson	233	5.3	
Freedom Alliance	Stephanie McGarry-Gribbin	66	1.5	
Turnout		4,361	36	
Green **gain** from Labour		Swing		
Green **gain** from Labour		Swing		
Green **gain** from Labour		Swing		

=== Clatterbridge ===
Clatterbridge (3 seats)
Party	Candidate	Votes	%	±%
**Conservative**	**Mary Jordan**	**2,042**	**43.2**	
**Conservative**	**Cherry Povall**	**2,042**	**43.2**	
**Conservative**	**Helen Cameron**	**1,952**	**41.3**	
Labour	Jenny Holliday	1,690	35.8	
Labour	Joanne Smith	1,576	33.4	
Labour	Michael Holliday	1,558	33.0	
Green	Dan Gorman	773	16.4	
Green	Jim McGinley	679	14.4	
Green	John Rodgers	611	12.9	
Liberal Democrats	Christopher Raymond	521	11.0	
Freedom Alliance	Pamela Peacock	84	1.8	
Turnout		4,724	42	
Conservative **hold**		Swing		
Conservative **hold**		Swing		
Conservative **hold**		Swing		

=== Claughton ===
Claughton (3 seats)
Party	Candidate	Votes	%	±%
**Labour**	**George Davies**	**2,053**	**61.8**	
**Labour**	**Stephen Foulkes**	**1,845**	**55.5**	
**Labour**	**Gillian Wood**	**1,830**	**55.1**	
Green	Susan Braddock	509	15.3	
Conservative	Andrew Hodson	502	15.1	
Conservative	Charles Assa	481	14.5	
Green	Liz Heydon	446	13.4	
Conservative	Sheridan Tear-Edmonds	429	12.9	
Liberal Democrats	David Evans	396	11.9	
Green	Perle Sheldricks	320	9.6	
Liberal Democrats	Roy Wood	297	8.9	
National Housing Party UK	Gary Bergin	149	4.5	
Turnout		3,322	29	
Labour **hold**		Swing		
Labour **hold**		Swing		
Labour **hold**		Swing		

=== Eastham ===
Eastham (3 seats)
Party	Candidate	Votes	%	±%
**Liberal Democrats**	**Phillip Gilchrist**	**2,421**	**62.0**	
**Liberal Democrats**	**Christopher Carubia**	**2,231**	**57.1**	
**Liberal Democrats**	**Helen Raymond**	**1,807**	**46.3**	
Labour	Melinda Downey	947	24.2	
Labour	Nicole Williams	835	21.4	
Labour	William Smith	807	20.7	
Conservative	Denise Crossley-Williams	408	10.4	
Green	Joy Hogg	369	9.4	
Conservative	William Harland	324	8.3	
Conservative	Philip Merry	322	8.2	
Green	Percy Hogg	252	6.4	
Green	Peter Rand	209	5.3	
Freedom Alliance	Sarah of the House of Blackburn	52	1.3	
Turnout		3,907	35	
Liberal Democrats **hold**		Swing		
Liberal Democrats **hold**		Swing		
Liberal Democrats **hold**		Swing		

=== Greasby, Frankby and Irby ===
Greasby, Frankby and Irby (3 seats)
Party	Candidate	Votes	%	±%
**Labour**	**Gail Jenkinson**	**2,740**	**49.9**	
**Labour**	**Grahame McManus**	**2,499**	**45.5**	
**Labour**	**Mark Skillicorn**	**2,219**	**40.4**	
Conservative	Tracy Elzeiny	2,078	37.9	
Conservative	David Fairbairn	1,987	36.2	
Conservative	Darren May	1,923	35.0	
Green	Miriam Cooke	601	10.9	
Green	Tom Green	527	9.6	
Liberal Democrats	Alan Brighouse	438	8.0	
Green	Cathy Page	410	7.5	
Independent	David Burgess-Joyce	193	3.5	
Freedom Alliance	Rosie Evans	97	1.8	
Turnout		5,490	48	
Labour **gain** from Conservative		Swing		
Labour **gain** from Conservative		Swing		
Labour **gain** from Conservative		Swing		

=== Heswall ===
Heswall (3 seats)
Party	Candidate	Votes	%	±%
**Conservative**	**Andrew Hodson**	**2,351**	**45.8**	
**Conservative**	**Kathryn Hodson**	**2,213**	**43.2**	
**Conservative**	**Graham Davies**	**2,171**	**42.3**	
Liberal Democrats	Elizabeth Brame	2,150	41.9	
Liberal Democrats	Philip Waterfield	1,983	38.7	
Liberal Democrats	David Jones	1,766	34.4	
Labour	Sophia Ballantyne	733	14.3	
Labour	Michael Royden	587	11.4	
Labour	Jimmy Sergi	544	10.6	
Freedom Alliance	Donna Lyons-Whearty	74	1.4	
Turnout		5,128	47	
Conservative **hold**		Swing		
Conservative **hold**		Swing		
Conservative **hold**		Swing		

Withdrawn nominations

- Barbara Burton, Green (renominated in West Kirby and Thurstaston)
- Paul May, Green

=== Hoylake and Meols ===
Hoylake and Meols (3 seats)
Party	Candidate	Votes	%	±%
**Conservative**	**Tony Cox**	**2,197**	**45.9**	
**Conservative**	**Andrew Gardner**	**2,168**	**45.3**	
**Conservative**	**Max Booth**	**2,158**	**45.1**	
Labour	Sheila Murphy	1,721	36.0	
Labour	Paul Carney	1,560	32.6	
Labour	David Sindall	1,507	31.5	
Green	Alix Cockcroft	640	13.4	
Green	Fintan Cleary	562	11.7	
Green	Julian Priest	415	8.7	
Liberal Democrats	Tom Hughes	291	6.1	
Liberal Democrats	Ian Johnson	260	5.4	
Freedom Alliance	Colin Roper	106	2.2	
Turnout		4,786	46	
Conservative **hold**		Swing		
Conservative **hold**		Swing		
Conservative **hold**		Swing		

=== Leasowe and Moreton East ===
Leasowe and Moreton East (3 seats)
Party	Candidate	Votes	%	±%
**Labour**	**Angie Davies**	**1,959**	**61.9**	
**Labour**	**Louise Luxon-Kewley**	**1,881**	**59.4**	
**Labour**	**Paul Jobson**	**1,688**	**53.3**	
Independent	Karl Greaney	642	20.3	
Conservative	Tracy Blackburn	530	16.7	
Conservative	Neil Cartwright	477	15.1	
Conservative	Jonathan Yongjiang Wang	355	11.2	
Green	Katie Bristow	334	10.5	
Green	Michael Dixon	261	8.2	
Green	Holly Turner	258	8.1	
Liberal Democrats	Chase Newton	227	7.2	
Freedom Alliance	Juliette Mantley	93	2.9	
Turnout		3,167	29	
Labour **hold**		Swing		
Labour **hold**		Swing		
Labour **hold**		Swing		

=== Liscard ===
Liscard (3 seats)
Party	Candidate	Votes	%	±%
**Labour**	**Daisy Kenny**	**2,012**	**62.6**	
**Labour**	**Janette Williamson**	**1,865**	**58.0**	
**Labour**	**James Laing**	**1,826**	**56.8**	
Green	Helen Burnham	541	16.8	
Conservative	Jane Owens	502	15.6	
Conservative	Stephen Dobson	440	13.7	
Conservative	Lesley May	413	12.8	
Green	William Gorman	369	11.5	
Green	Peter Lageard	324	10.1	
Reform	Daniel Bruffell	220	6.8	
Liberal Democrats	Vicky Downie	195	6.1	
Freedom Alliance	Lynsey Welsh	107	3.3	
Turnout		3,216	29	
Labour **hold**		Swing		
Labour **hold**		Swing		
Labour **hold**		Swing		

=== Moreton West and Saughall Massie ===
Moreton West and Saughall Massie (3 seats)
Party	Candidate	Votes	%	±%
**Conservative**	**Vida Wilson**	**1,908**	**48.3**	
**Conservative**	**Colin Baldwin**	**1,901**	**48.1**	
**Conservative**	**John Bennett**	**1,875**	**47.5**	
Labour	Mark Cawood	1,508	38.2	
Labour	Katherine Stuart	1,428	36.1	
Labour	Maegan Stuart	1,358	34.4	
Green	Hilary Cullen	343	8.7	
Green	Jane Turner	294	7.4	
Green	Rick Hughes	239	6.0	
Reform	Paul Whelligan	123	3.1	
Liberal Democrats	Christopher Teggin	105	2.7	
Liberal Democrats	Robert Thompson	80	2.0	
Freedom Alliance	Niamh McGarry-Gribbin	63	1.6	
Turnout		3,951	37	
Conservative **hold**		Swing		
Conservative **hold**		Swing		
Conservative **hold**		Swing		

=== New Brighton ===
New Brighton (3 seats)
Party	Candidate	Votes	%	±%
**Labour**	**Tony Jones**	**2,261**	**58.8**	
**Labour**	**Sue Powell-Wilde**	**2,137**	**55.6**	
**Labour**	**Paul Martin**	**2,109**	**54.9**	
Green	Cynthia Stonall	739	19.2	
Conservative	Ann Lavin	661	17.2	
Green	Alexandra Badwi	653	17.0	
Green	Andrew Bennett	618	16.1	
Conservative	Andrew Gilfoyle	598	15.6	
Conservative	Elizabeth Murphy	544	14.2	
Liberal Democrats	Charlie Houghton	338	8.8	
Freedom Alliance	Dermot Bolger	176	4.6	
Turnout		3,844	34	
Labour **hold**		Swing		
Labour **hold**		Swing		
Labour **hold**		Swing		

=== Oxton ===
Oxton (3 seats)
Party	Candidate	Votes	%	±%
**Liberal Democrats**	**Allan Brame**	**2,689**	**65.6**	
**Liberal Democrats**	**Stuart Kelly**	**2,592**	**63.2**	
**Liberal Democrats**	**Mike Redfern**	**2,117**	**51.6**	
Labour	Clint Agard	964	23.5	
Labour	Tony Cottier	942	23.0	
Green	Allan Goode	577	14.1	
Green	Rachel Heydon	535	13.0	
Green	Alex Wallis	269	6.6	
Conservative	Jon Loach	169	4.1	
Conservative	Freda Punnen	155	3.8	
Conservative	Colin Vallance-Owen	153	3.7	
Reform	Philip Griffiths	113	2.8	
Freedom Alliance	Monika Skinner	104	2.5	
Turnout		4,101	38	
Liberal Democrats **hold**		Swing		
Liberal Democrats **hold**		Swing		
Liberal Democrats **hold**		Swing		

=== Pensby and Thingwall ===
In October 2025, Pitt left the Labour Party and joined Your Party.

Pensby and Thingwall (3 seats)
Party	Candidate	Votes	%	±%
**Labour**	**Ann Ainsworth**	**2,118**	**45.9**	
**Labour**	**Mike Sullivan**	**2,050**	**44.4**	
**Labour**	**Richie Pitt**	**1,883**	**40.8**	
Conservative	Mike Collins	1,768	38.3	
Conservative	Ivan Camphor	1,617	35.0	
Conservative	Leah Fraser	1,582	34.3	
Green	Allen Burton	550	11.9	
Green	Marilyn Jones	520	11.3	
Liberal Democrats	Judith Wolf	444	9.6	
Green	Mark Reeves	403	8.7	
Freedom Alliance	William Parry	93	2.0	
Turnout		4,616	44	
Labour **gain** from Conservative		Swing		
Labour **gain** from Conservative		Swing		
Labour **gain** from Conservative		Swing		

Withdrawn nominations

- Paula Basnett, Labour (renominated in Rock Ferry)

=== Prenton ===
Prenton (3 seats)
Party	Candidate	Votes	%	±%
**Green**	**Christopher Cooke**	**2,419**	**62.4**	
**Green**	**Harry Gorman**	**2,297**	**59.3**	
**Green**	**Naomi Graham**	**2,227**	**57.5**	
Labour	John Ainsworth	1,246	32.1	
Labour	Rachel Millard	1,144	29.5	
Labour	Archie Wood	1,012	26.1	
Conservative	Michael Clements	215	5.5	
Conservative	Mark Davey-Hayford	172	4.4	
Conservative	Sibani Ghosh	161	4.2	
Liberal Democrats	Jonathan Richardson	105	2.7	
Freedom Alliance	Lily Evans	82	2.1	
Liberal Democrats	David Tyrrell	57	1.5	
Turnout		3,876	35.8	
Green **hold**		Swing		
Green **hold**		Swing		
Green **hold**		Swing		

=== Rock Ferry ===
Rock Ferry (3 seats)
Party	Candidate	Votes	%	±%
**Labour**	**Paula Basnett**	**1,525**	**61.6**	
**Labour**	**Tony Murphy**	**1,428**	**57.7**	
**Green**	**Craig McDonald**	**1,073**	**43.3**	
Green	Gareth Rowlands	713	28.8	
No Description	Yvonne Nolan	493	19.9	
Green	Helen O'Donnell	469	18.9	
Conservative	Susan Amyes	190	7.7	
Liberal Democrats	Frank Doyle	171	6.9	
Conservative	Paul Taylor	141	5.7	
Conservative	Margaret Kalil	140	5.7	
Reform	Tony Stanley	131	5.3	
Turnout		2,476	24	
Labour **hold**		Swing		
Labour **hold**		Swing		
Green **gain** from Labour		Swing		

Withdrawn nominations

- Yvonne Nolan, Labour (renominated without description)
- Claire O'Hagan, Labour

=== Seacombe ===
Seacombe (3 seats)
Party	Candidate	Votes	%	±%
**Labour**	**Tom Laing**	**1,755**	**54.7**	
**Labour**	**Kaitlin Stuart**	**1,699**	**52.9**	
**Labour**	**Paul Stuart**	**1,622**	**50.5**	
Green	Rae Voller	1,255	39.1	
Green	Hannah Rapley	1,243	38.7	
Green	Sarah Spoor	1,107	34.5	
Conservative	Bobby Cartwright	116	3.6	
Freedom Alliance	Paul Cardin	107	3.3	
Conservative	Adele Lumb	106	3.3	
Conservative	Evelyn Sorrell	103	3.2	
Liberal Democrats	Anthony Morris	72	2.2	
Turnout		3,211	31	
Labour **hold**		Swing		
Labour **hold**		Swing		
Labour **hold**		Swing		

=== Upton ===
Upton (3 seats)
Party	Candidate	Votes	%	±%
**Labour**	**Stephen Bennett**	**2,236**	**62.9**	
**Labour**	**Jean Robinson**	**2,140**	**60.2**	
**Labour**	**Jerry Williams**	**1,920**	**54.0**	
Green	Lily Clough	660	18.6	
Conservative	Johnathan Andrew	649	18.3	
Conservative	Andy Brown	600	16.9	
Conservative	Thomas Maxwell	549	15.5	
Green	Tim Watson	458	12.9	
Green	Nadia Parsons	340	9.6	
Liberal Democrats	Alan Davies	252	7.1	
Freedom Alliance	Debbie Cameron	137	3.9	
Turnout		3,553	29	
Labour **hold**		Swing		
Labour **hold**		Swing		
Labour **hold**		Swing		

=== Wallasey ===
Wallasey (3 seats)
Party	Candidate	Votes	%	±%
**Conservative**	**Lesley Rennie**	**2,391**	**44.8**	
**Conservative**	**Ian Lewis**	**2,370**	**44.4**	
**Labour**	**Brenda Hall**	**2,294**	**43.0**	
Labour	Graeme Cooper	2,261	42.3	
Conservative	Steven Hoey	2,238	41.9	
Labour	Saul Murphy	2,191	41.0	
Green	Moira Gommon	333	6.2	
Green	Jane Gorman	301	5.6	
Green	Ryan Davies	290	5.4	
Liberal Democrats	John Codling	245	4.6	
Liberal Democrats	John Uriel	116	2.2	
Freedom Alliance	Matthew Chell	93	1.7	
Reform	Lynda Williams	89	1.7	
Turnout		5,340	46	
Conservative **hold**		Swing		
Conservative **hold**		Swing		
Labour **gain** from Conservative		Swing		

=== West Kirby and Thurstaston ===
West Kirby and Thurstaston (3 seats)
Party	Candidate	Votes	%	±%
**Conservative**	**Jenny Johnson**	**1,884**	**41.3**	
**Conservative**	**Jeff Green**	**1,859**	**40.8**	
**Conservative**	**Simon Mountney**	**1,820**	**39.9**	
Labour	Paula Kenny	1,433	31.4	
Labour	Mary MacEwan	1,388	30.5	
Labour	Elizabeth Watkins	1,307	28.7	
Liberal Democrats	John Cresswell	670	14.7	
Liberal Democrats	Peter Reisdorf	634	13.9	
Green	Barbara Burton	498	10.9	
Green	Mark Wilde	493	10.8	
Liberal Democrats	Ross Campbell	469	10.3	
Green	Karen Brenchley	463	10.2	
Freedom Alliance	Pat Whearty	133	2.9	
Turnout		4,557	45	
Conservative **hold**		Swing		
Conservative **hold**		Swing		
Conservative **hold**		Swing		

Withdrawn nominations

- Richie Pitt, Labour (renominated in Pensby and Thingwall)
