= 1991 Wirral Metropolitan Borough Council election =

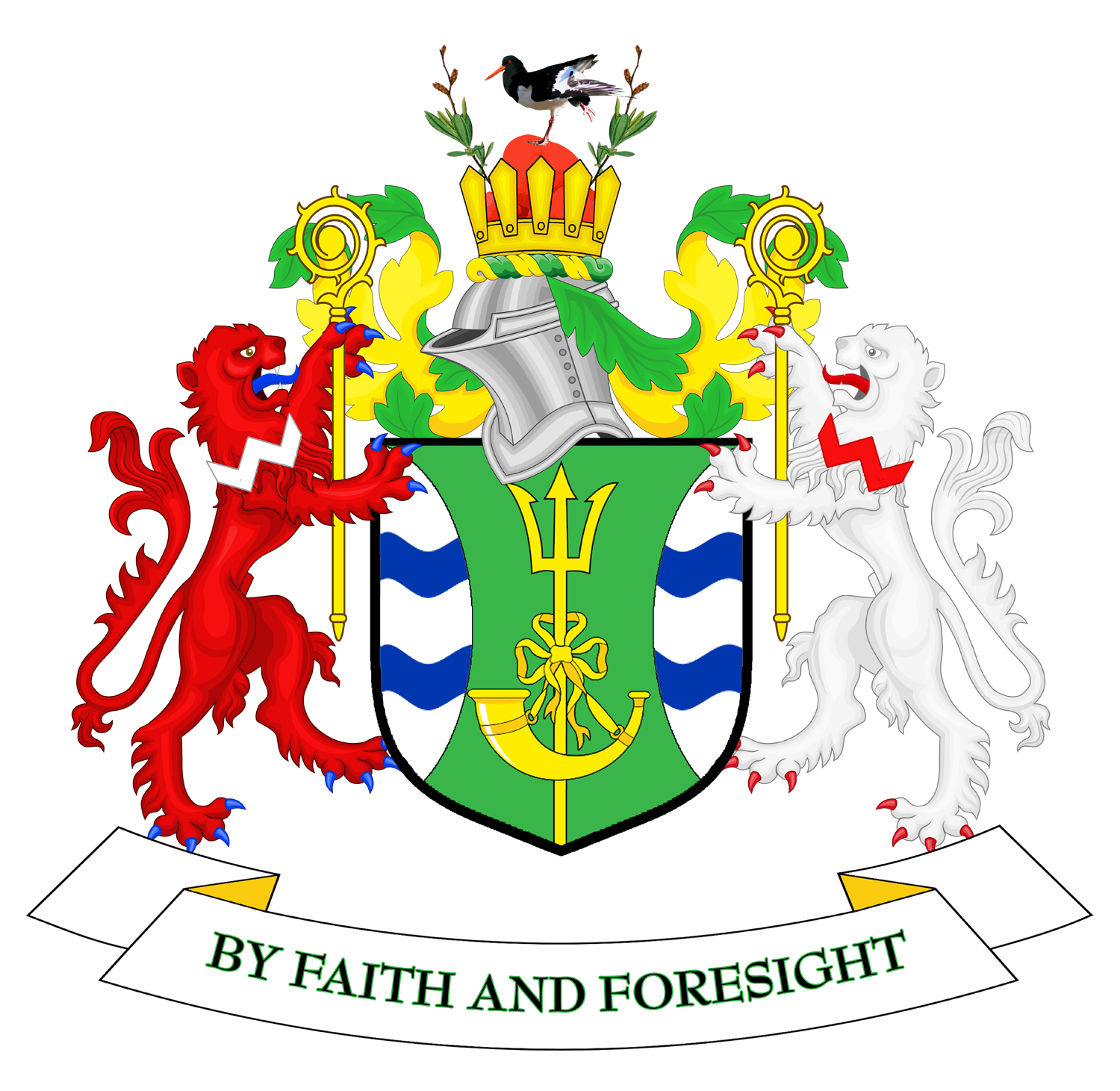
- 2 May 1991

23 of 66 seats (One Third and one by-election) to Wirral Metropolitan Borough Council 34 seats needed for a majority
- Turnout: 48.8% (▼3.6%)
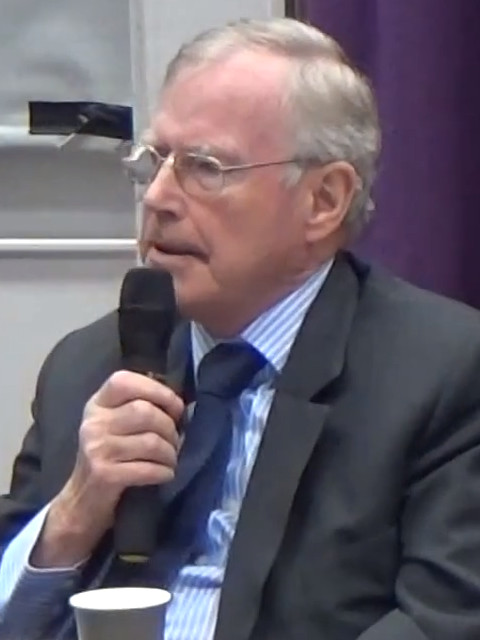

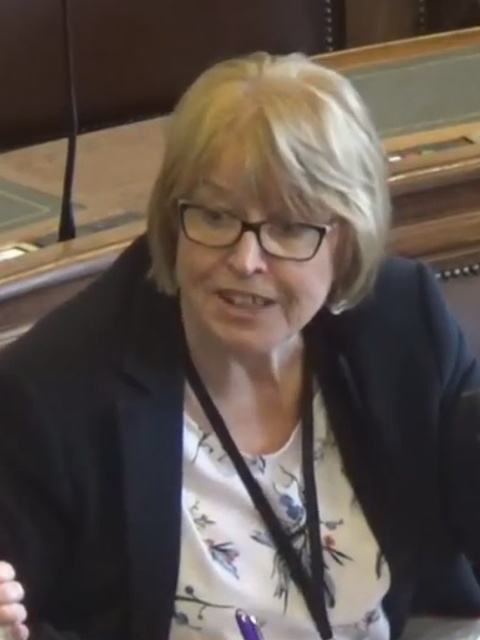
	First party	Second party	Third party
			LD
Leader	John Hale	Yvonne Nolan	Gordon Lindsay
Party	Conservative	Labour	Liberal Democrats
Leader's seat	Hoylake	Moreton (lost)	Oxton
Last election	8 seats, 34.7%	14 seats, 45.9%	1 seat, 14.3%
Seats before	23	33	8
Seats won	11	9	3
Seats after	24	34	7
Seat change	▲1	▲1	▼1
Popular vote	54,489	39,347	24,049
Percentage	43.6%	31.5%	19.3%
Swing	▲8.9%	▼14.4%	▲5.0%
- Map of results of 1991 election
Leader of the Council before election
Yvonne Nolan (Labour)
No Overall Control
Leader of the Council after election
George Clark
Labour

The 1991 Wirral Metropolitan Borough Council election took place on 2 May 1991 to elect members of Wirral Metropolitan Borough Council in England. This election was held on the same day as other local elections.

After the election, the composition of the council was:

Party	Seats	±
Labour	34	▲1
Conservative	24	▲1
Liberal Democrats	7	▼1
Independent Labour	1	▼1

== Election results ==
=== Overall election result ===
Overall result compared with 1990.

Wirral Metropolitan Borough Council election results, 1991
Party	Candidates						Votes		
Party	Stood	Elected	Gained	Unseated	Net	% of total	%	No.	Net %
Conservative	23	11	2	1	▲1	45.5	43.6	54,489	▲8.9
Labour	23	9	2	1	▲1	40.9	31.5	39,347	▼14.4
Liberal Democrats	23	3	0	1	▼1	13.6	19.3	24,049	▲5.0
Green	23	0	0	0	Steady	0.0	4.0	4,949	▼1.1
Independent Labour	2	0	0	1	▼1	0.0	1.7	2,081	N/A

(Note: % of total refers to % of wards won.)

== Ward results ==
=== Bebington ===
Bebington
Party	Candidate	Votes	%	±%
Conservative	Hilary Jones	3,360	56.1	▲10.1
Labour	Audrey Moore	1,701	28.4	▼11.3
Liberal Democrats	Kevin Turner	698	11.7	▲2.4
Green	T. Keen	230	3.8	▼1.2
Majority		1,659	27.7	▲21.4
Registered electors		11,144		
Turnout			53.7	▼3.6
Conservative hold		Swing	▲10.7	

=== Bidston ===
Bidston
Party	Candidate	Votes	%	±%
Labour	Harry Smith	2,374	75.2	▼9.1
Conservative	M. Vickers	366	11.6	▲5.0
Liberal Democrats	A. Molyneux	287	9.1	▲3.9
Green	Robert Mitchell	129	4.1	▲0.2
Majority		2,008	63.6	▼14.1
Registered electors		8,842		
Turnout			35.7	▼7.5
Labour hold		Swing	▼7.1	

=== Birkenhead ===
Birkenhead
Party	Candidate	Votes	%	±%
Labour	Phillip Davies	2,610	71.0	▼10.8
Conservative	J. Oliver	490	13.3	▲5.3
Liberal Democrats	Stephen Niblock	404	11.0	▲4.5
Green	Pamela Mitchell	174	4.7	▲1.0
Majority		2,120	57.6	▼16.2
Registered electors		10,912		
Turnout			33.7	▼9.7
Labour hold		Swing	▼8.1	

=== Bromborough ===
Bromborough
Party	Candidate	Votes	%	±%
Labour	A. Rose	2,291	43.4	▼11.7
Conservative	S. Flynn	1,822	34.5	▲10.0
Liberal Democrats	L. Smith	927	17.6	▲1.6
Green	D. Hughes	240	4.5	▲0.1
Majority		469	8.9	▼21.7
Registered electors		11,481		
Turnout			46.0	▼4.9
Labour hold		Swing	▼10.9	

=== Clatterbridge ===
Clatterbridge
Party	Candidate	Votes	%	±%
Conservative	Leonard Moore	4,341	60.7	▲6.8
Labour	T. Collins	1,286	18.0	▼10.6
Liberal Democrats	M. Cody	1,285	18.0	▲5.4
Green	Nigel Birchenough	243	3.4	▼1.5
Majority		3,055	42.7	▲17.3
Registered electors		14,231		
Turnout			50.3	▼2.0
Conservative hold		Swing	▲8.7	

=== Claughton ===
Claughton
Party	Candidate	Votes	%	±%
Liberal Democrats	Stuart Kelly	2,390	42.8	▲17.7
Labour	S. Van Vliet	1,736	31.1	▼14.7
Conservative	D. Smith	1,306	23.4	▼1.5
Green	A. Cuthbertson	153	2.7	▼1.6
Majority		654	11.7	N/A
Registered electors		10,914		
Turnout			51.2	▼5.8
Liberal Democrats hold		Swing	▲16.2	

=== Eastham ===
Eastham
Party	Candidate	Votes	%	±%
Liberal Democrats	George Mitchell	2,847	43.5	▲12.1
Labour	K. Dawson	1,977	30.2	▼10.2
Conservative	A. Drury	1,580	24.2	▲1.1
Green	Perle Sheldricks	136	2.1	▼3.0
Majority		870	13.3	N/A
Registered electors		11,994		
Turnout			54.5	▼2.3
Liberal Democrats hold		Swing	▲11.2	

=== Egerton ===
Egerton
Party	Candidate	Votes	%	±%
Labour	Walter Smith	2,452	51.7	▼9.6
Conservative	A. Flynn	1,066	22.5	▲5.1
Liberal Democrats	Freda Anderson	1,044	22.0	▲5.2
Green	Tina Fox	183	3.9	▼0.7
Majority		1,386	29.2	▼14.7
Registered electors		11,370		
Turnout			41.7	▼5.1
Labour hold		Swing	▼7.4	

=== Heswall ===
Heswall
Party	Candidate	Votes	%	±%
Conservative	Peter Johnson	4,883	72.0	▲6.7
Liberal Democrats	W. Jones	975	14.4	▲3.1
Labour	H. Walsh	693	10.2	▼5.0
Green	J. Bruce	230	3.4	▼4.8
Majority		3,908	57.6	▲7.6
Registered electors		13,374		
Turnout			50.7	▼2.9
Conservative hold		Swing	▲3.8	

=== Hoylake ===
Hoylake (2)
Party	Candidate	Votes	%	±%
Conservative	John Hale (Note: Incumbent councillor for Liscard ward.) (Note: Elected to serve a 4-year term.)	4,714	72.9	▲12.5
Conservative	J. Stedmon (Note: Elected to serve a 3-year term.)	4,568	–	–
Liberal Democrats	S. Welshman	772	11.9	▲2.9
Liberal Democrats	J. Dennis	761	–	–
Labour	S. Wynne	654	10.1	▼11.9
Labour	J. Rohan	609	–	–
Green	L. Bufton	325	5.0	▼3.5
Green	Cecil Bowler	317	–	–
Majority		3,942	61.0	▲22.6
Registered electors		12,644		
Turnout			52.2	▲2.1
Conservative hold		Swing	▲11.3	
Conservative hold		Swing	–	

=== Leasowe ===
Leasowe
Party	Candidate	Votes	%	±%
Labour	Michael Cashman	1,779	39.6	▼31.7
Independent Labour	Ken Fox	1,326	29.5	New
Conservative	H. Tooke	944	21.0	▲3.4
Liberal Democrats	Moira Gallagher	327	7.3	▲0.8
Green	Allen Burton	116	2.6	▼2.0
Majority		453	10.1	▼43.6
Registered electors		9,819		
Turnout			45.7	▼3.0
Labour gain from Independent Labour		Swing	▼21.8	

=== Liscard ===
Liscard
Party	Candidate	Votes	%	±%
Labour	E. Williams	2,753	45.2	▼12.2
Conservative	M. Ebbs	2,412	39.6	▲7.6
Liberal Democrats	John Uriel	660	10.8	▲5.1
Green	W. Lorimer	271	4.4	▼0.4
Majority		341	5.6	▼19.8
Registered electors		11,644		
Turnout			52.3	▼3.0
Labour gain from Conservative		Swing	▼9.9	

=== Moreton ===
Moreton
Party	Candidate	Votes	%	±%
Conservative	Ann Dishman	2,701	48.8	▲13.1
Labour	Yvonne Nolan	1,501	27.1	▼28.3
Independent Labour	H. Euers	755	13.7	New
Liberal Democrats	C. Robertson	434	7.8	▲2.7
Green	R. Georgeson	140	2.5	▼1.3
Majority		1,200	21.7	N/A
Registered electors		9,381		
Turnout			59.0	▲0.2
Conservative gain from Labour		Swing	▲20.7	

=== New Brighton ===
New Brighton
Party	Candidate	Votes	%	±%
Conservative	A. Adams	2,849	49.7	▲10.0
Labour	Aileen Keyes	1,869	32.6	▼13.9
Liberal Democrats	John Codling	679	11.8	▲4.2
Green	Sally Davis	341	5.9	▼0.3
Majority		980	17.1	N/A
Registered electors		11,688		
Turnout			49.1	▼6.6
Conservative hold		Swing	▲12.0	

=== Oxton ===
Oxton
Party	Candidate	Votes	%	±%
Liberal Democrats	Patricia Willams	2,792	47.4	▲7.8
Conservative	R. Hughes	1,883	32.0	▲5.1
Labour	J. Mitchell	973	16.5	▼13.4
Green	K. Cuthbertson	242	4.1	▲0.6
Majority		909	15.4	▲5.7
Registered electors		11,781		
Turnout			50.0	▼2.4
Liberal Democrats hold		Swing	▲2.9	

=== Prenton ===
Prenton
Party	Candidate	Votes	%	±%
Conservative	Lesley Rennie	2,709	39.2	▲12.7
Liberal Democrats	John Thornton	2,620	37.9	▲4.9
Labour	W. Lowe	1,431	20.7	▼16.8
Green	David Pye	148	2.1	▼0.9
Majority		89	1.3	N/A
Registered electors		12,253		
Turnout			56.4	▼2.3
Conservative gain from Liberal Democrats		Swing	▲6.2	

=== Royden ===
Royden
Party	Candidate	Votes	%	±%
Conservative	C. Kevan	4,394	66.7	▲7.7
Liberal Democrats	B. Crosbie	913	13.9	▲4.6
Labour	P. Jones	849	12.9	▼12.6
Green	Garnette Bowler	432	6.6	▲0.3
Majority		3,481	52.8	▲19.3
Registered electors		12,829		
Turnout			51.3	▲2.1
Conservative hold		Swing	▲9.7	

=== Seacombe ===
Seacombe
Party	Candidate	Votes	%	±%
Labour	J. Scully	3,229	62.4	▼15.6
Conservative	L. May	1,159	22.4	▲9.3
Liberal Democrats	D. Kelly	545	10.5	▲5.3
Green	L. Georgeson	238	4.6	▲0.9
Majority		2,070	40.0	▼24.9
Registered electors		11,792		
Turnout			43.8	▼9.9
Labour hold		Swing	▼12.5	

=== Thurstaston ===
Thurstaston
Party	Candidate	Votes	%	±%
Conservative	Jeffrey Green	4,220	66.5	▲11.3
Labour	W. Gamet	960	15.1	▼11.6
Liberal Democrats	Charles Wall	837	13.2	▲3.9
Green	David Burton	326	5.1	▼3.7
Majority		3,260	51.4	▲22.9
Registered electors		12,704		
Turnout			49.9	▼1.1
Conservative hold		Swing	▲11.5	

=== Tranmere ===
Tranmere
Party	Candidate	Votes	%	±%
Labour	Christine Meaden	2,360	64.5	▼16.5
Conservative	Mark Hughes	678	18.5	▲9.0
Liberal Democrats	Stephen Blaylock	461	12.6	▲7.2
Green	Angela Upton	162	4.4	▲0.2
Majority		1,682	46.0	▼25.6
Registered electors		10,066		
Turnout			36.4	▼7.5
Labour hold		Swing	▼12.8	

=== Upton ===
Upton
Party	Candidate	Votes	%	±%
Labour	Peter Corcoran	2,598	40.8	▼15.7
Conservative	Geoffrey Caton	2,532	39.7	▲11.4
Liberal Democrats	Eric Copestake	993	15.6	▲4.6
Green	S. Boyle	252	4.0	▼0.2
Majority		66	1.1	▼27.1
Registered electors		12,963		
Turnout			49.2	▼3.1
Labour hold		Swing	▼13.6	

=== Wallasey ===
Wallasey
Party	Candidate	Votes	%	±%
Conservative	C. Whatling	4,080	60.5	▲11.9
Labour	D. Pitchard	1,271	18.8	▼8.3
Liberal Democrats	Peter Reisdorf	1,159	17.2	▼2.8
Green	Barbara Burton	238	3.5	▼0.9
Majority		2,809	41.7	▲20.2
Registered electors		12,271		
Turnout			55.0	▼2.7
Conservative hold		Swing	▲10.1	

== Notes ==
• italics denote the sitting councillor • bold denotes the winning candidate
