= Yvonne Nolan =

British politician

Cllr Yvonne Nolan
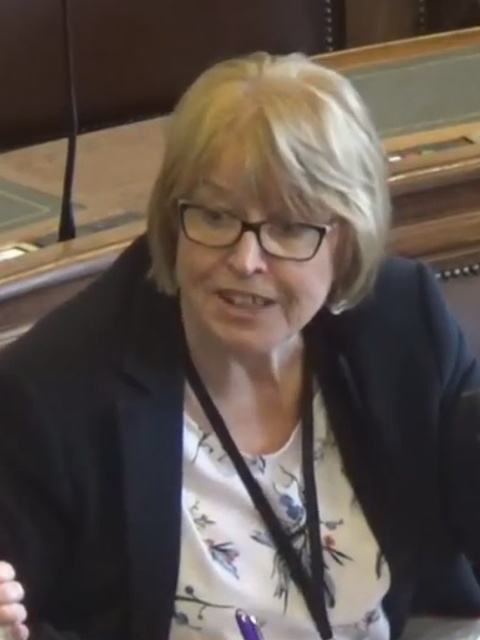
- Nolan in 2019

Deputy Leader of Wirral Metropolitan Borough Council
- In office 26 May 2021 – 25 May 2022
- Preceded by: Anita Leech
- Succeeded by: Jean Robinson

Wirral Metropolitan Borough Councillor for Rock Ferry
- In office 2 May 2019 – 2023
- Preceded by: Chris Meaden
- Majority: 185 (6.5%)

Leader of Wirral Metropolitan Borough Council
- In office 1990–1991
- Preceded by: John Hale (1986)
- Succeeded by: George Clark

Labour Party Group Leader on Wirral Metropolitan Borough Council
- In office 1990–1991
- Preceded by: Peter Corcoran
- Succeeded by: George Clark

Wirral Metropolitan Borough Councillor for Moreton
- In office 7 May 1987 – 2 May 1991
- Preceded by: David Williams
- Succeeded by: Ann Dishman
- Majority: 97 (1.9%)

Personal details
- Born: Yvonne Carol Nolan
- Party: Labour

Yvonne Carol Nolan is a British Labour politician and former Leader of Wirral Council.

She was first elected to Wirral Council in 1987 to Moreton ward beating three time incumbent Conservative David Williams. She became Leader of the Council and Leader of the Labour group once Labour gained a significant minority at the 1990 election. Although Labour gained control of the council in 1991, Nolan lost her seat to Conservative Ann Dishman by 1,200 votes.

In 2018, she was selected as the Labour candidate for the Rock Ferry beating the incumbent of 28 years, Chris Meaden. Meaden stood against Nolan but lost by 185 votes. In 2023 she was deselected by the Labour Party and stood in Rock Ferry as an independent candidate, but was not elected.

== Electoral performance ==
Wirral Council elections
Date of election	Ward	Party	Votes	% of votes	Result
1987	Moreton	Labour	2,223	43.1	Elected
1991	Moreton	Labour	1,501	27.1	Not elected
2010	Heswall	Labour	1,465	17.3	Not elected
2019	Rock Ferry	Labour	1,280	45.0	Elected
2023	Rock Ferry	Independent	493	8.0	Not elected

Political offices
Preceded by Chris Meaden	Councillor for Rock Ferry; 2019–present	Incumbent
Preceded by David Williams	Councillor for Moreton; 1987–1991	Succeeded by Ann Dishman
Preceded by John Hale (1986)	Leader of Wirral Council; 1990–1991	Succeeded by George Clark
Party political offices
Preceded by Peter Corcoran	Leader of Wirral Council Labour Group; 1990–1991	Succeeded by George Clark
