= Moreton West and Saughall Massie (ward) =

Electoral ward of Wirral, England

Moreton West and Saughall Massie (previously Moreton and Saughall Massie, 1973 to 1979, and Moreton, 1979 to 2004) is a Wirral Metropolitan Borough Council ward in the Wallasey Parliamentary constituency in England.

== Councillors ==
Election	Councillor (Party)	Councillor (Party)	Councillor (Party)	Ref.
1973	Jim Edwards (Labour)	G. Watkins (Labour)	E. Lewis (Labour)	
1975	Jim Edwards (Labour)	G. Watkins (Labour)	David Williams (Conservative)	
1976	Jim Edwards (Labour)	I. Walker (Conservative)	David Williams (Conservative)	
1978	A. Young (Conservative)	I. Walker (Conservative)	David Williams (Conservative)	
1979	A. Young (Conservative)	I. Walker (Conservative)	David Williams (Conservative)	
1980	A. Young (Conservative)	I. Walker (Conservative)	David Williams (Conservative)	
1982	A. Young (Conservative)	I. Walker (Conservative)	David Williams (Conservative)	
1983	A. Young (Conservative)	I. Walker (Conservative)	David Williams (Conservative)	
1984	A. Young (Conservative)	I. Walker (Conservative)	David Williams (Conservative)	
1986	Stuart Marshall-Clarke (Labour)	I. Walker (Conservative)	David Williams (Conservative)	
1987	Stuart Marshall-Clarke (Labour)	I. Walker (Conservative)	Yvonne Nolan (Labour)	
1988	Stuart Marshall-Clarke (Labour)	George Clarke (Labour)	Yvonne Nolan (Labour)	
1990	M. Groves (Labour)	George Clarke (Labour)	Yvonne Nolan (Labour)	
1991	M. Groves (Labour)	George Clarke (Labour)	Ann Dishman (Conservative)	
1992	M. Groves (Labour)	Vic Borg (Conservative)	Ann Dishman (Conservative)	
1994	M. Groves (Labour)	Vic Borg (Conservative)	Ann Dishman (Conservative)	
1995	M. Groves (Labour)	Vic Borg (Conservative)	Margaret Green (Labour)	
1996	M. Groves (Labour)	Ann McLachlan (Labour)	Margaret Green (Labour)	
1998	M. Groves (Labour)	Ann McLachlan (Labour)	Margaret Green (Labour)	
1999	M. Groves (Labour)	Ann McLachlan (Labour)	Margaret Green (Labour)	
2000	M. Groves (Labour)	Chris Blakeley (Conservative)	Margaret Green (Labour)	
2002	Leslie Spencer (Conservative)	Chris Blakeley (Conservative)	Margaret Green (Labour)	
2003	Leslie Spencer (Conservative)	Chris Blakeley (Conservative)	Suzanne Moseley (Conservative)	
2004	Simon Mountney (Conservative)	Chris Blakeley (Conservative)	Suzanne Moseley (Conservative)	
2006	Simon Mountney (Conservative)	Chris Blakeley (Conservative)	Suzanne Moseley (Conservative)	
2007	Simon Mountney (Conservative)	Chris Blakeley (Conservative)	Suzanne Moseley (Conservative)	
2008	Simon Mountney (Conservative)	Chris Blakeley (Conservative)	Suzanne Moseley (Conservative)	
2009 by-election	Simon Mountney (Conservative)	Chris Blakeley (Conservative)	Steve Williams (Conservative)	
2010	Simon Mountney (Conservative)	Chris Blakeley (Conservative)	Steve Williams (Conservative)	
2011	Simon Mountney (Conservative)	Chris Blakeley (Conservative)	Steve Williams (Conservative)	
2012	Simon Mountney (Conservative)	Chris Blakeley (Conservative)	Steve Williams (Conservative)	
2014	Bruce Berry (Conservative)	Chris Blakeley (Conservative)	Steve Williams (Conservative)	
2015	Bruce Berry (Conservative)	Chris Blakeley (Conservative)	Steve Williams (Conservative)	
2016	Bruce Berry (Conservative)	Chris Blakeley (Conservative)	Steve Williams (Conservative)	
2018	Bruce Berry (Conservative)	Chris Blakeley (Conservative)	Steve Williams (Conservative)	
2019	Bruce Berry (Conservative)	Chris Blakeley (Conservative)	Steve Williams (Conservative)	
2021	Bruce Berry (Conservative)	Max Booth (Conservative)	Steve Williams (Conservative)	
2022	Vida Wilson (Conservative)	Max Booth (Conservative)	Steve Williams (Conservative)	
