= 1987 Wirral Metropolitan Borough Council election =

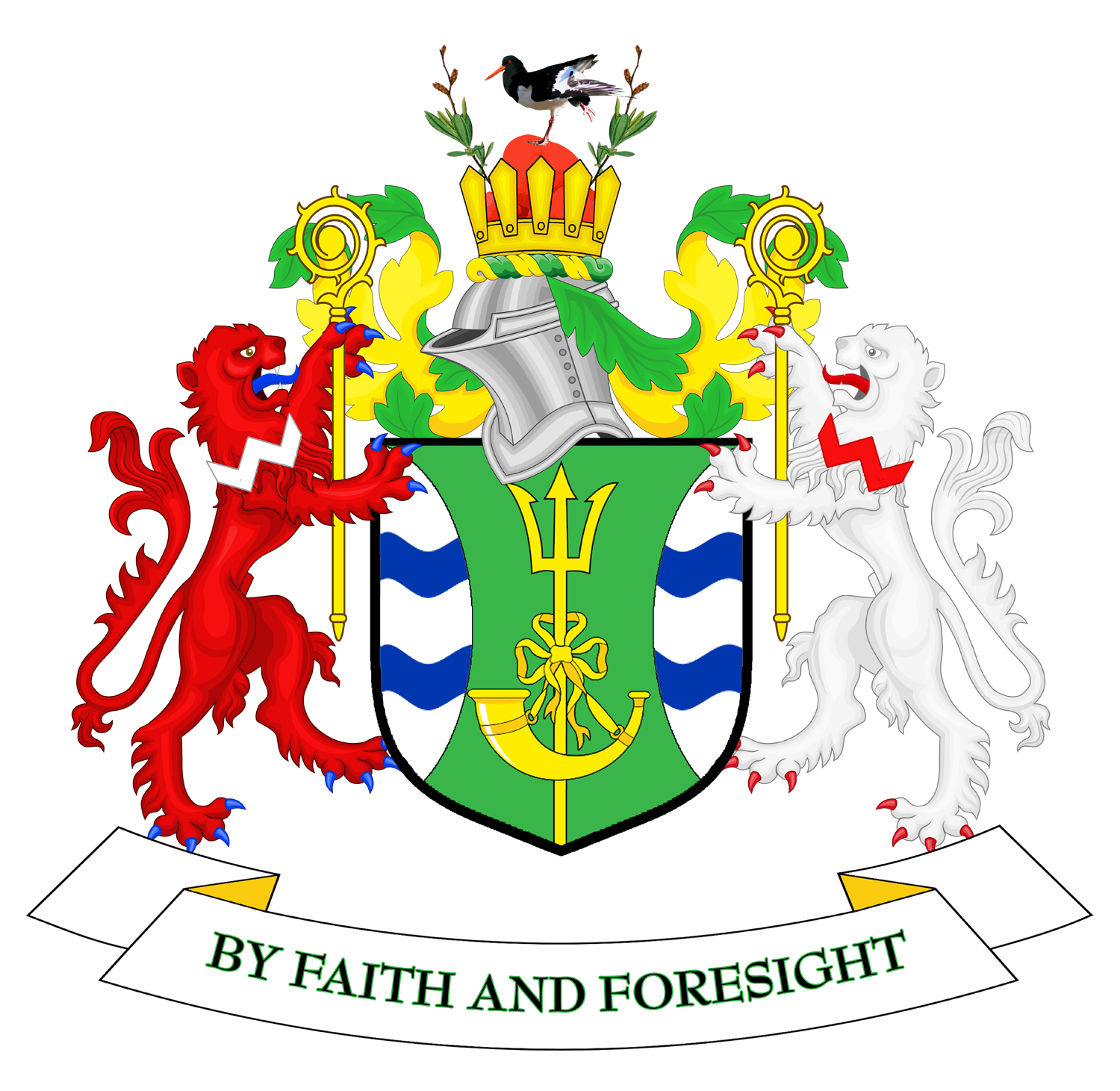
- 7 May 1987

24 of 66 seats (One Third and two by-elections) to Wirral Metropolitan Borough Council 34 seats needed for a majority
- Turnout: 48.8% (▲2.2%)
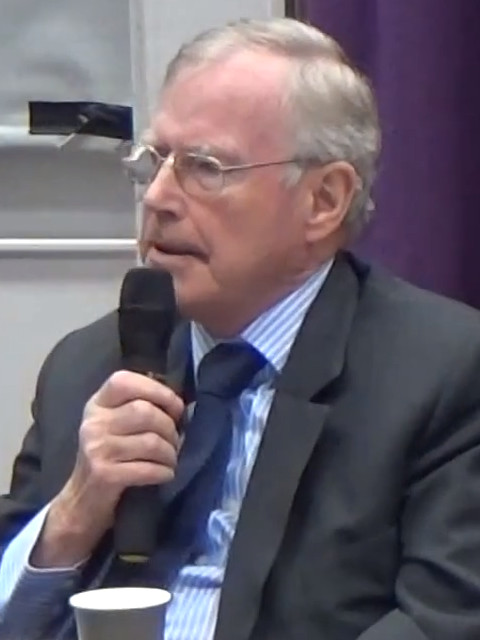
	First party	Second party	Third party
		Lab	SDP–Lib
Leader	John Hale	Peter Corcoran	Roy Perkins
Party	Conservative	Labour	Alliance
Leader's seat	Liscard	Upton	Claughton
Last election	9 seats, 34.6%	10 seats, 37.3%	5 seats, 24.7%
Seats before	30	26	10
Seats won	10	10	4
Seats after	29	27	10
Seat change	▼1	▲1	Steady
Popular vote	53,954	42,215	28,555
Percentage	42.1%	33.0%	22.3%
Swing	▲7.5%	▼4.3%	▼2.4%
- Map of results of 1987 election
Leader of the Council before election
None
No Overall Control
Leader of the Council after election
None
No Overall Control

The 1987 Wirral Metropolitan Borough Council election took place on 7 May 1987 to elect members of Wirral Metropolitan Borough Council in England. This election was held on the same day as other local elections.

After the election, the composition of the council was:

Party	Seats	±
Conservative	29	▼1
Labour	27	▲1
Alliance	10	Steady

== Election results ==
=== Overall election result ===
Overall result compared with 1986.

Wirral Metropolitan Borough Council election results, 1987
Party	Candidates						Votes		
Party	Stood	Elected	Gained	Unseated	Net	% of total	%	No.	Net %
Conservative	24	10	0	1	▼1	40.9	42.1	53,954	▲7.5
Labour	24	10	1	0	▲1	40.9	33.0	42,215	▼4.3
Alliance	24	4	0	0	Steady	18.2	22.3	28,555	▼2.4
Residents	2	0	0	0	Steady	0.0	1.4	1,792	▼0.7
Green	11	0	0	0	Steady	0.0	1.2	1,597	▼0.1

(Note: % of total refers to % of wards won.)

== Ward results ==
=== Bebington ===
Bebington
Party	Candidate	Votes	%	±%
Conservative	Hilary Jones	3,565	55.8	▲6.8
Labour	M. Vobe	1,667	26.1	▼5.2
Alliance	Kevin Turner	1,049	16.4	▼1.6
Green	Cecil Bowler	111	1.7	▼0.1
Majority		1,898	29.7	▲12.0
Registered electors		11,541		
Turnout			55.4	▲3.8
Conservative hold		Swing	▲6.0	

=== Bidston ===
Bidston
Party	Candidate	Votes	%	±%
Labour	Andrew Davies	3,265	81.9	▼1.7
Conservative	W. Houldin	375	9.4	▲0.7
Alliance	S. Wood	347	8.7	▲1.0
Majority		2,890	72.5	▼2.5
Registered electors		9,883		
Turnout			40.3	▲2.5
Labour hold		Swing	▼1.2	

=== Birkenhead ===
Birkenhead
Party	Candidate	Votes	%	±%
Labour	Arthur Smith	3,085	69.5	▼0.5
Alliance	C. Townsend	840	18.9	▼3.1
Conservative	C. Harris	514	11.6	▲3.6
Majority		2,245	50.6	▲2.6
Registered electors		11,314		
Turnout			39.2	▼0.5
Labour hold		Swing	▲1.3	

=== Bromborough ===
Bromborough
Party	Candidate	Votes	%	±%
Labour	A. Rose	2,739	47.9	▼4.5
Conservative	C. Molyneux	2,170	37.9	▲8.3
Alliance	G. Daley	813	14.2	▼3.9
Majority		569	9.9	▼12.9
Registered electors		11,712		
Turnout			48.9	▲3.1
Labour hold		Swing	▼6.4	

=== Clatterbridge ===
Clatterbridge
Party	Candidate	Votes	%	±%
Conservative	M. Cureton	4,705	64.0	▲9.9
Alliance	Stephen Niblock	1,413	19.2	▼7.0
Labour	M. Harper	1,239	16.8	▼2.8
Majority		3,292	44.7	▲16.8
Registered electors		14,218		
Turnout			51.7	▲6.2
Conservative hold		Swing	▲8.5	

=== Claughton ===
Claughton
Party	Candidate	Votes	%	±%
Alliance	E. Curtis	2,142	37.7	▼0.1
Conservative	C. Bowditch	1,810	31.8	▲1.8
Labour	P. Spruce	1,623	28.6	▼1.6
Green	I. Wheelwright	108	1.9	▼0.1
Majority		332	5.8	▼1.8
Registered electors		11,185		
Turnout			50.8	▲0.1
Alliance hold		Swing	▼0.8	

=== Eastham ===
Eastham
Party	Candidate	Votes	%	±%
Alliance	George Mitchell	2,649	41.3	▼14.1
Conservative	Mary Jordan	2,154	33.6	▲16.0
Labour	S. Henderson	1,611	25.1	▼1.9
Majority		495	7.7	▼20.7
Registered electors		12,147		
Turnout			52.8	▲2.1
Alliance hold		Swing	▼10.4	

=== Egerton ===
Egerton
Party	Candidate	Votes	%	±%
Labour	Walter Smith	2,662	52.4	▼2.0
Conservative	G. Francomb	1,360	26.8	▲4.4
Alliance	K. Hughes	954	18.8	▼1.9
Green	David Pye	103	2.0	▼0.5
Majority		1,302	25.6	▼6.4
Registered electors		11,628		
Turnout			43.7	▼1.8
Labour hold		Swing	▼3.2	

=== Heswall ===
Heswall
Party	Candidate	Votes	%	±%
Conservative	V. Robertson	4,997	71.5	▲8.5
Alliance	Robert Wilkins	1,463	20.9	▼6.9
Labour	A. Clark	404	5.8	▼3.3
Green	J. Bruce	122	1.7	New
Majority		3,534	50.6	▲15.3
Registered electors		13,396		
Turnout			52.1	▲5.6
Conservative hold		Swing	▲7.7	

=== Hoylake ===
Hoylake
Party	Candidate	Votes	%	±%
Conservative	P. Pedley	4,002	60.2	▲16.3
Residents	J. Leonard	1,068	16.1	▼8.5
Alliance	J. Otterson	940	14.1	▼8.1
Labour	A. Witter	451	6.8	▼2.5
Green	P. Kavanagh	191	2.9	New
Majority		2,934	44.1	▲24.8
Registered electors		12,800		
Turnout			52.0	▲3.5
Conservative hold		Swing	▲12.4	

=== Leasowe ===
Leasowe (2)
Party	Candidate	Votes	%	±%
Labour	Ken Fox (Note: Elected to serve a 4-year term.)	2,649	61.0	▼1.2
Labour	Vera Ruck (Note: Elected to serve a 3-year term.)	2,197	–	–
Conservative	L. Kennedy	1,229	28.3	▲5.2
Conservative	Vic Borg	1,199	–	–
Alliance	John Codiling	468	10.8	▼3.8
Alliance	B. Thomas	446	–	–
Majority		1,420	32.7	▼6.4
Registered electors		10,133		
Turnout			40.4	▼0.9
Labour hold		Swing	▼3.2	
Labour hold		Swing	–	

=== Liscard ===
Liscard
Party	Candidate	Votes	%	±%
Conservative	John Hale	2,851	45.8	▲7.6
Labour	John Clark	2,484	39.9	▼6.0
Alliance	John Uriel	892	14.3	▼1.6
Majority		367	5.9	N/A
Registered electors		11,868		
Turnout			52.5	▲2.9
Conservative hold		Swing	▲6.8	

=== Moreton ===
Moreton
Party	Candidate	Votes	%	±%
Labour	Yvonne Nolan	2,223	43.1	▼2.9
Conservative	David Williams	2,126	41.2	▲5.9
Alliance	D. Kelly	811	15.7	▼3.0
Majority		97	1.9	▼8.8
Registered electors		9,361		
Turnout			55.1	▲1.1
Labour gain from Conservative		Swing	▼4.4	

=== New Brighton ===
New Brighton (2)
Party	Candidate	Votes	%	±%
Conservative	A. Adams	2,541	43.7	▲3.7
Conservative	P. Buzzard (Note: Elected to serve a 1-year term.)	2,456	–	–
Labour	C. Penfold	1,907	32.8	▼4.0
Labour	L. Blair	1,840	–	–
Alliance	R. Curphey	1,373	23.6	▲0.5
Alliance	J. Eyres	1,188	–	–
Majority		634	10.9	▲7.7
Registered electors		11,924		
Turnout			47.4	▲2.0
Conservative hold		Swing	▲3.9	
Conservative hold		Swing	–	

=== Oxton ===
Oxton
Party	Candidate	Votes	%	±%
Alliance	Patricia Williams	2,186	39.1	▼9.5
Conservative	Leonard Moore	1,985	35.5	▲9.5
Labour	T. Kelly	1,287	23.0	▼0.3
Green	A. Tebbs	131	2.3	▲0.2
Majority		201	3.6	▼19.0
Registered electors		11,539		
Turnout			48.4	▲1.4
Alliance hold		Swing	▼9.5	

=== Prenton ===
Prenton
Party	Candidate	Votes	%	±%
Alliance	John Thornton	2,959	42.2	▲1.8
Conservative	Brian Cummings	2,577	36.8	▲5.1
Labour	W. Gamet	1,356	19.3	▼6.9
Green	C. Pye	116	1.7	▲0.1
Majority		382	5.5	▼3.2
Registered electors		12,723		
Turnout			55.1	▲1.2
Alliance hold		Swing	▼1.7	

=== Royden ===
Royden
Party	Candidate	Votes	%	±%
Conservative	Reg Cumpstey	3,792	58.8	▲9.8
Alliance	Peter Reisdorf	1,038	16.1	▼0.9
Residents	W. Evans	724	11.2	▼6.9
Labour	G. Chalinor	709	11.0	▼4.9
Green	K. Cuthbertson	188	2.9	New
Majority		2,754	42.7	▲11.8
Registered electors		12,856		
Turnout			50.2	▲4.2
Conservative hold		Swing	▲5.9	

=== Seacombe ===
Seacombe
Party	Candidate	Votes	%	±%
Labour	G. Kenna	3,070	62.1	▼5.8
Conservative	R. Venner	1,058	21.4	▲2.7
Alliance	J. Williams	815	16.5	▲3.1
Majority		2,012	40.7	▼8.6
Registered electors		12,228		
Turnout			40.4	▼0.9
Labour hold		Swing	▼4.3	

=== Thurstaston ===
Thurstaston
Party	Candidate	Votes	%	±%
Conservative	Jeffrey Green	3,956	62.4	▲13.1
Alliance	Charles Wall	1,190	18.8	▼1.4
Labour	S. Connell	827	13.1	▼3.9
Green	David Burton	363	5.7	▼7.8
Majority		2,766	43.7	▲14.6
Registered electors		12,912		
Turnout			49.1	▲3.2
Conservative hold		Swing	▲7.3	

=== Tranmere ===
Tranmere
Party	Candidate	Votes	%	±%
Labour	Geoff Barker	2,794	67.3	▼9.7
Alliance	E. Harrison	686	16.5	▲6.5
Conservative	J. Hockaday	601	14.5	▲3.4
Green	Garnette Bowler	72	1.7	▼0.3
Majority		2,108	50.8	▼15.1
Registered electors		10,795		
Turnout			38.5	▲0.3
Labour hold		Swing	▼7.6	

=== Upton ===
Upton
Party	Candidate	Votes	%	±%
Labour	Peter Corcoran	2,985	45.4	▼4.9
Conservative	Geoffrey Watt	2,003	30.5	▲0.9
Alliance	E. Hunt	1,494	22.7	▲3.9
Green	G. Osler	92	1.4	▲0.1
Majority		982	14.9	▼5.8
Registered electors		12,921		
Turnout			50.9	▲2.7
Labour hold		Swing	▼2.9	

=== Wallasey ===
Wallasey
Party	Candidate	Votes	%	±%
Conservative	C. Whatling	3,583	52.7	▲2.4
Alliance	Moira Gallagher	2,033	29.9	▲1.1
Labour	M. Mannin	1,178	17.3	▼3.6
Majority		1,550	22.8	▲1.3
Registered electors		12,456		
Turnout			54.5	▲4.1
Conservative hold		Swing	▲0.7	

== Notes ==
• italics denote the sitting councillor • bold denotes the winning candidate
