= David Burgess-Joyce =

British politician

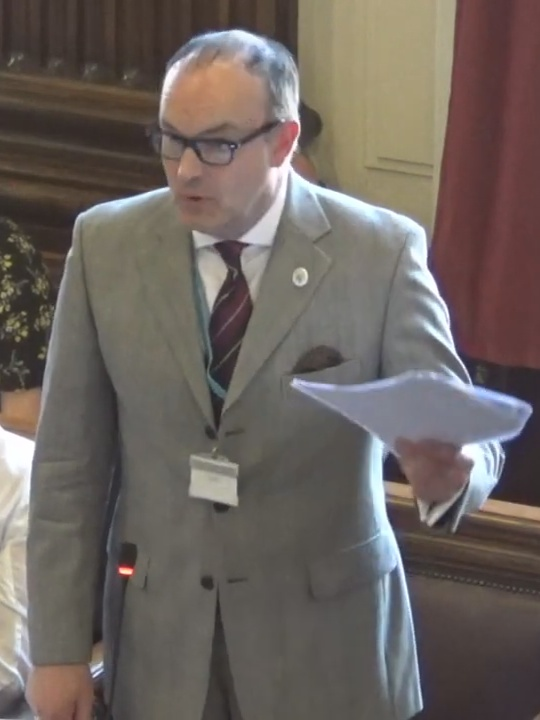
- Burgess-Joyce at Wallasey Town Hall in July 2019

Wirral Metropolitan Borough Councillor for Greasby, Frankby and Irby
- In office 7 May 2015 – 4 May 2023
- Preceded by: Mike Hornby
- Succeeded by: Gail Jenkinson
- Majority: 1,880 (34.6%)

Personal details
- Born: David Robert Burgess-Joyce; 25 February 1964 (age 62)
- Party: Reform UK

David Burgess-Joyce (born 25 February 1964) is a politician and the former Chief Officer of Merseyside Police Special Constabulary.

== Career ==
He served from 1982 and was Head of Organisation Development for the Serious Organised Crime Agency from 2004 until he was either dismissed for gross misconduct in 2013 or retired in early 2014. Details of the alleged misconduct were not revealed, but were reported to have potentially involved improper expenses claims. He denied any such conduct, saying "I totally refute any allegations of untoward expenses claims on my part during my time working with the agency," and saying he had actually retired in early 2014 due to ill health.

After leaving office, Burgess-Joyce entered local politics, being elected Conservative councillor for the Greasby, Frankby and Irby ward in 2015 and 2019. In 2016 he stood for Police and Crime Commissioner but came second with 20% of the vote.

He once compared the rhetoric of MP David Lammy to causing as much damage to community cohesion as the Ku Klux Klan.

In July 2022, he was deselected by the Conservative Party following his "deeply offensive" comments about Labour frontbencher David Lammy, meaning that he was not able to defend the Greasby, Frankby and Irby ward as a Conservative candidate. In February 2023 he was selected by the local officials of the Conservative Party to stand in the Heswall ward. However, in March 2023 he was prevented from standing by the Conservative Party after a request was made to the national party. Burgess-Joyce claimed, without evidence, that this was a result of "dark forces" in the Conservative Party.

In March 2023, he described the Liberal Democrat party during a Council meeting as "taking bribes", resulting in a formal complaint being made.

In May 2023, Burgess-Joyce again stood for councillor in the Greasby, Frankby and Irby ward, this time as an Independent candidate. He lost, coming eleventh out of twelve candidates, with 1% of the vote.

In June 2024 it was revealed that Burgess-Joyce was to be the candidate for the Reform Party in the Wallasey constituency in the 2024 United Kingdom general election. He lost, coming second with 16% of the vote.

== Honours ==

Ribbon	Description	Notes
	Queen Elizabeth II Golden Jubilee Medal	2002; UK Version of this Medal
	Queen Elizabeth II Diamond Jubilee Medal	2012; UK Version of this Medal
	Special Constabulary Long Service Medal	With 2 Clasps
