= 1990 Wirral Metropolitan Borough Council election =

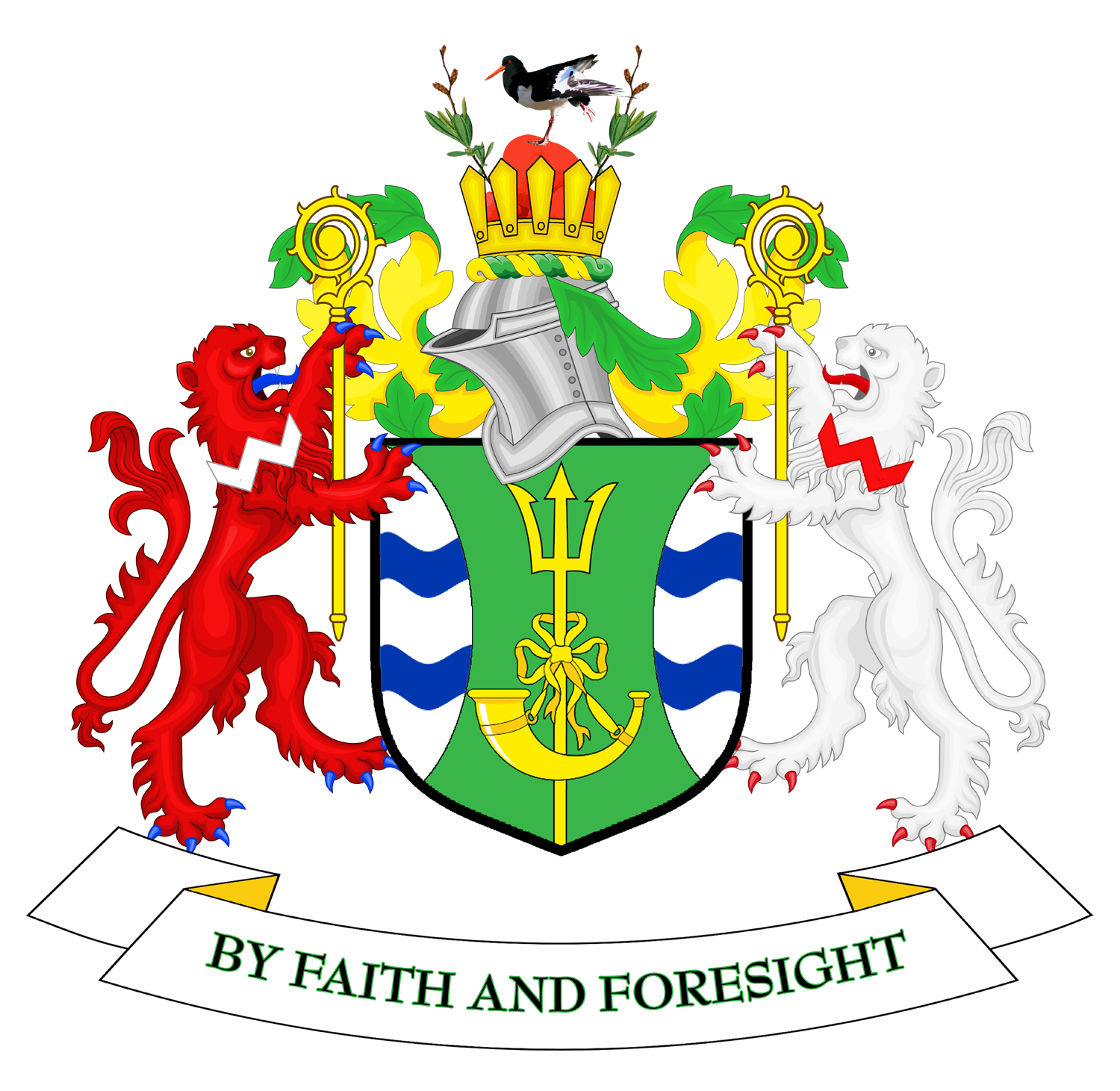
- 3 May 1990

23 of 66 seats (One Third and one by-election) to Wirral Metropolitan Borough Council 34 seats needed for a majority
- Turnout: 52.4% (▲7.9%)
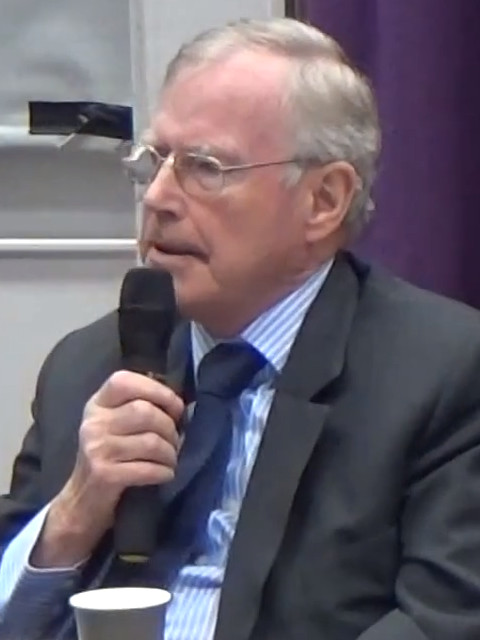
	First party	Second party	Third party
	Lab		LD
Leader	Peter Corcoran	John Hale	Ed Cunniffe
Party	Labour	Conservative	Liberal Democrats
Leader's seat	Upton	Liscard	Prenton (lost)
Last election	13 seats, 41.9%	7 seats, 41.9%	2 seats, 13.5%
Seats before	29	24	10
Seats won	14	8	1
Seats after	33	23	7
Seat change	▲4	▼1	▼3
Popular vote	60,891	45,993	18,918
Percentage	45.9%	34.7%	14.3%
Swing	▲4.0%	▼7.2%	▲0.8%
- Map of results of 1990 election
Leader of the Council before election
None
No Overall Control
Leader of the Council after election
Yvonne Nolan (Labour)
No Overall Control

The 1990 Wirral Metropolitan Borough Council election took place on 3 May 1990 to elect members of Wirral Metropolitan Borough Council in England. This election was held on the same day as other local elections.

After the election, the composition of the council was:

Party	Seats	±
Labour	33	▲4
Conservative	23	▼1
Liberal Democrats	7	▼3
Independent Labour	3	Steady

== Election results ==
=== Overall election result ===
Overall result compared with 1988.

Wirral Metropolitan Borough Council election results, 1990
Party	Candidates						Votes		
Party	Stood	Elected	Gained	Unseated	Net	% of total	%	No.	Net %
Labour	23	14	4	0	▲4	63.6	45.9	60,891	▲4.0
Conservative	23	8	0	1	▼1	31.8	34.7	45,993	▼7.2
Liberal Democrats	23	1	0	3	▼3	4.5	14.3	18,918	▲0.8
Green	22	0	0	0	Steady	0.0	5.1	6,737	▲2.8

(Note: % of total refers to % of wards won.)

== Ward results ==
=== Bebington ===
Bebington
Party	Candidate	Votes	%	±%
Conservative	A. Green	2,900	46.0	▼8.2
Labour	Audrey Moore	2,504	39.7	▲5.3
Liberal Democrats	Kevin Turner	589	9.3	▲3.0
Green	Garnette Bowler	317	5.0	▼0.1
Majority		396	6.3	▼13.5
Registered electors		11,015		
Turnout			57.3	▲8.5
Conservative hold		Swing	▼6.8	

=== Bidston ===
Bidston
Party	Candidate	Votes	%	±%
Labour	William Nock	3,189	84.3	▼0.6
Conservative	T. Robinson	249	6.6	▼1.9
Liberal Democrats	Francis Doyle	196	5.2	▲0.9
Green	Robert Mitchell	149	3.9	▲1.5
Majority		2,940	77.7	▲1.3
Registered electors		8,764		
Turnout			43.2	▲7.4
Labour hold		Swing	▲0.6	

=== Birkenhead ===
Birkenhead
Party	Candidate	Votes	%	±%
Labour	M. Gaskell	3,821	81.8	▲5.3
Conservative	J. Oliver	372	8.0	▼4.6
Liberal Democrats	Stephen Niblock	306	6.5	▼1.9
Green	T. Keen	174	3.7	▲1.2
Majority		3,449	73.8	▲9.9
Registered electors		10,766		
Turnout			43.4	▲7.4
Labour hold		Swing	▲5.0	

=== Bromborough ===
Bromborough
Party	Candidate	Votes	%	±%
Labour	A. Witter	3,171	55.1	▼3.0
Conservative	J. Faulkner	1,411	24.5	▼8.3
Liberal Democrats	L. Smith	921	16.0	▲8.7
Green	Perle Sheldricks	256	4.4	▲2.7
Majority		1,760	30.6	▲5.3
Registered electors		11,311		
Turnout			50.9	▲7.2
Labour hold		Swing	▲2.7	

=== Clatterbridge ===
Clatterbridge
Party	Candidate	Votes	%	±%
Conservative	Myrra Lea	3,977	53.9	▼7.6
Labour	S. Christie	2,107	28.6	▲4.5
Liberal Democrats	M. Cody	926	12.6	▲1.0
Green	Nigel Birchenough	362	4.9	▲2.0
Majority		1,870	25.4	▼12.0
Registered electors		14,102		
Turnout			52.3	▲7.8
Conservative hold		Swing	▼6.1	

=== Claughton ===
Claughton
Party	Candidate	Votes	%	±%
Labour	Stephen Foulkes	2,797	45.8	▲4.7
Liberal Democrats	Stuart Kelly	1,530	25.1	▲4.4
Conservative	D. Smith	1,518	24.9	▼10.5
Green	Barbara Burton	262	4.3	▲1.6
Majority		1,267	20.7	▲15.0
Registered electors		10,708		
Turnout			57.0	▲7.6
Labour gain from Liberal Democrats		Swing	▲7.5	

=== Eastham ===
Eastham
Party	Candidate	Votes	%	±%
Labour	Vera Ruck (Note: Incumbent councillor for Leasowe ward.)	2,704	40.4	▲5.9
Liberal Democrats	Phillip Gilchrist	2,104	34.1	▼2.1
Conservative	E. Green	1,547	23.1	▼6.9
Green	R. Georgeson	340	5.1	▲3.2
Majority		600	9.0	▲8.0
Registered electors		11,782		
Turnout			56.8	▲10.7
Labour gain from Liberal Democrats		Swing	▲4.0	

=== Egerton ===
Egerton
Party	Candidate	Votes	%	±%
Labour	P. Williams	3,257	61.3	▼4.9
Conservative	A. Flynn	923	17.4	▼4.7
Liberal Democrats	Freda Anderson	891	16.8	▲8.2
Green	C. Pye	243	4.6	▲1.5
Majority		2,334	43.9	▼0.2
Registered electors		11,359		
Turnout			46.8	▲6.5
Labour hold		Swing	▼0.1	

=== Heswall ===
Heswall (2)
Party	Candidate	Votes	%	±%
Conservative	Ian Mackenzie (Note: Elected to serve a 4-year term.)	4,689	65.3	▼10.5
Conservative	T. Price (Note: Elected to serve a 2-year term.)	4,496	–	–
Labour	H. Walsh	1,094	15.2	▲3.4
Labour	N. Apperley	1,092	–	–
Liberal Democrats	W. Jones	814	11.3	▲2.3
Liberal Democrats	Edward Norton	767	–	–
Green	J. Bruce	587	8.2	▲4.8
Majority		3,595	50.0	▼14.0
Registered electors		13,171		
Turnout			53.6	▲10.6
Conservative hold		Swing	▼7.0	
Conservative hold		Swing	–	

=== Hoylake ===
Hoylake
Party	Candidate	Votes	%	±%
Conservative	R. Amyes	3,771	60.4	▼9.3
Labour	D. Blake	1,374	22.0	▲7.5
Liberal Democrats	J. Dennis	561	9.0	▼2.5
Green	C. Fisher	533	8.5	▲4.2
Majority		2,397	38.4	▼16.8
Registered electors		12,464		
Turnout			50.1	▲6.5
Conservative hold		Swing	▼8.4	

=== Leasowe ===
Leasowe
Party	Candidate	Votes	%	±%
Labour	D. Curtis	3,391	71.3	▲2.3
Conservative	H. Tooke	836	17.6	▼9.4
Liberal Democrats	M. Glover	309	6.5	▲2.5
Green	S. Hughes	220	4.6	New
Majority		2,555	53.7	▲11.8
Registered electors		9,773		
Turnout			48.7	▲7.5
Labour hold		Swing	▲5.9	

=== Liscard ===
Liscard
Party	Candidate	Votes	%	±%
Labour	Gordon Paterson	3,655	57.4	▲4.1
Conservative	R. Beard	2,039	32.0	▼7.5
Liberal Democrats	John Uriel	365	5.7	▼1.5
Green	Pamela Mitchell	304	4.8	New
Majority		1,616	25.4	▲11.6
Registered electors		11,511		
Turnout			55.3	▲1.9
Labour hold		Swing	▲5.8	

=== Moreton ===
Moreton
Party	Candidate	Votes	%	±%
Labour	M. Groves	3,049	55.4	▲2.2
Conservative	P. Pluck	1,968	35.7	▼5.2
Liberal Democrats	C. Robertson	279	5.1	▲0.7
Green	Allen Burton	212	3.8	▲2.3
Majority		1,081	19.6	▲7.3
Registered electors		9,372		
Turnout			58.8	▲4.5
Labour hold		Swing	▲3.7	

=== New Brighton ===
New Brighton
Party	Candidate	Votes	%	±%
Labour	D. Harris	2,966	46.5	▲2.4
Conservative	Vic Borg	2,529	39.7	▼3.8
Liberal Democrats	John Codling	487	7.6	▲1.5
Green	Sally Davis	394	6.2	▲3.9
Majority		437	6.9	▲6.3
Registered electors		11,450		
Turnout			55.7	▲9.1
Labour gain from Conservative		Swing	▲3.1	

=== Oxton ===
Oxton
Party	Candidate	Votes	%	±%
Liberal Democrats	Gordon Lindsay	2,420	39.6	▲1.4
Labour	Harry Smith	1,827	29.9	▲6.7
Conservative	R. Hughes	1,644	26.9	▼9.8
Green	George Bowler	213	3.5	▲1.6
Majority		593	9.7	▲8.2
Registered electors		11,656		
Turnout			52.4	▲5.7
Liberal Democrats hold		Swing	▲4.1	

=== Prenton ===
Prenton
Party	Candidate	Votes	%	±%
Labour	John Cocker (Note: Incumbent councillor for Bidston ward.)	2,685	37.5	▲13.6
Liberal Democrats	Edward Cunniffe	2,364	33.0	▼6.9
Conservative	J. Weatherhead	1,901	26.5	▼7.7
Green	David Pye	213	3.0	▲1.0
Majority		321	4.5	N/A
Registered electors		12,198		
Turnout			58.7	▲9.8
Labour gain from Liberal Democrats		Swing	▲5.1	

=== Royden ===
Royden
Party	Candidate	Votes	%	±%
Conservative	W. Lloyd	3,696	59.0	▼5.9
Labour	M. Watson	1,599	25.5	▲8.9
Liberal Democrats	Elizabeth Brame	580	9.3	▼5.7
Green	K. Cuthbertson	392	6.3	▲2.9
Majority		2,097	33.5	▼14.8
Registered electors		12,736		
Turnout			49.2	▲7.2
Conservative hold		Swing	▼7.4	

=== Seacombe ===
Seacombe
Party	Candidate	Votes	%	±%
Labour	Janet Jackson	4,796	78.0	▲2.1
Conservative	L. May	803	13.1	▼4.4
Liberal Democrats	D. Kelly	322	5.2	▲1.9
Green	D. Hughes	230	3.7	New
Majority		3,993	64.9	▲6.5
Registered electors		11,447		
Turnout			53.7	▲11.0
Labour hold		Swing	▲3.3	

=== Thurstaston ===
Thurstaston
Party	Candidate	Votes	%	±%
Conservative	David Fletcher	3,537	55.2	▼10.4
Labour	W. Gamet	1,710	26.7	▲8.1
Liberal Democrats	Charles Wall	597	9.3	▼0.6
Green	David Burton	567	8.8	▲2.9
Majority		1,827	28.5	▼18.5
Registered electors		12,564		
Turnout			51.0	▲9.2
Conservative hold		Swing	▼9.2	

=== Tranmere ===
Tranmere
Party	Candidate	Votes	%	±%
Labour	William Davies	3,526	81.0	▲1.9
Conservative	G. Francomb	412	9.5	▼4.0
Liberal Democrats	C. Townsend	233	5.4	▲0.6
Green	Angela Upton	182	4.2	▲1.6
Majority		3,114	71.5	▲5.9
Registered electors		9,907		
Turnout			43.9	▲9.2
Labour hold		Swing	▲3.0	

=== Upton ===
Upton
Party	Candidate	Votes	%	±%
Labour	Hugh Lloyd	3,786	56.5	▲1.2
Conservative	Geoffrey Caton	1,895	28.3	▼2.5
Liberal Democrats	Peter Reisdorf	736	11.0	▼0.8
Green	L. Georgeson	281	4.2	▲2.2
Majority		1,891	28.2	▲3.7
Registered electors		12,798		
Turnout			52.3	▲8.2
Labour hold		Swing	▲1.9	

=== Wallasey ===
Wallasey
Party	Candidate	Votes	%	±%
Conservative	Michael Howden	3,376	48.6	▼10.7
Labour	B. Williams	1,883	27.1	▲2.8
Liberal Democrats	Moira Gallagher	1,388	20.0	▲3.5
Green	A. Cuthbertson	306	4.4	New
Majority		1,493	21.5	▼13.5
Registered electors		12,054		
Turnout			57.7	▲6.8
Conservative hold		Swing	▼6.8	

== Changes between 1990 and 1991 ==
Date	Ward	Name	Previous affiliation	New affiliation	Circumstance
?	Egerton	Alec Dunn	Independent Labour	Liberal Democrats	Defected.

== Notes ==
• italics denote the sitting councillor • bold denotes the winning candidate
