= Leasowe and Moreton East (ward) =

Electoral ward of Wirral, England

Leasowe and Moreton East (previously Leasowe, 1973 to 2004) is a Wirral Metropolitan Borough Council ward in the Wallasey Parliamentary constituency.

== Councillors ==
Election	Councillor (Party)	Councillor (Party)	Councillor (Party)	Ref.
1973	George Clark (Labour)	Bill Wells (Labour)	Ken Fox (Labour/Independent)	
1975	George Clark (Labour)	Bill Wells (Labour)	Ken Fox (Labour/Independent)	
1976	George Clark (Labour)	Bill Wells (Labour)	Ken Fox (Labour/Independent)	
1978	George Clark (Labour)	Bill Wells (Labour)	Ken Fox (Labour/Independent)	
1979	George Clark (Labour)	Bill Wells (Labour)	Ken Fox (Labour/Independent)	
1980	George Clark (Labour)	Jim Edwards (Labour/Independent)	Ken Fox (Labour/Independent)	
1982	George Clark (Labour)	Jim Edwards (Labour/Independent)	Ken Fox (Labour/Independent)	
1983	George Clark (Labour)	Jim Edwards (Labour/Independent)	Ken Fox (Labour/Independent)	
1984	George Clark (Labour)	Jim Edwards (Labour/Independent)	Ken Fox (Labour/Independent)	
1986	John George (Labour)	Jim Edwards (Labour/Independent)	Ken Fox (Labour/Independent)	
1987	Vera Ruck (Labour)	Jim Edwards (Labour/Independent)	Ken Fox (Labour/Independent)	
1988	Vera Ruck (Labour)	Jim Edwards (Labour/Independent)	Ken Fox (Labour/Independent)	
1990	D. Curtis (Labour)	Jim Edwards (Labour/Independent)	Ken Fox (Labour/Independent)	
1991	D. Curtis (Labour)	Jim Edwards (Labour/Independent)	Michael Cashman (Labour)	
1992	D. Curtis (Labour)	Aileen Keyes (Labour)	Michael Cashman (Labour)	
1994	Paul O'Connor (Labour)	M. Davies (Labour)	M. Keenan (Labour)	
1995	Paul O'Connor (Labour)	M. Davies (Labour)	Ernest Prout (Labour)	
1996	Paul O'Connor (Labour)	Ron Abbey (Labour)	Ernest Prout (Labour)	
1998	Iris Coates (Labour)	Ron Abbey (Labour)	Ernest Prout (Labour)	
1999	Iris Coates (Labour)	Ron Abbey (Labour)	Ernest Prout (Labour)	
2000	Iris Coates (Labour)	Ron Abbey (Labour)	Ernest Prout (Labour)	
2002	Iris Coates (Labour)	Ron Abbey (Labour)	Ernest Prout (Labour)	
2003	Iris Coates (Labour)	Ron Abbey (Labour)	Ernest Prout (Labour)	
2004	Iris Coates (Labour)	Ron Abbey (Labour)	Ernest Prout (Labour)	
2006	Iris Coates (Labour)	Ron Abbey (Labour)	Ernest Prout (Labour)	
2007	Iris Coates (Labour)	Ron Abbey (Labour)	Ernest Prout (Labour)	
2008	Iris Coates (Labour)	Ron Abbey (Labour)	Ian Lewis (Conservative)	
2010	Anne McArdle (Labour)	Ron Abbey (Labour)	Ian Lewis (Conservative)	
2011	Anne McArdle (Labour)	Ron Abbey (Labour)	Ian Lewis (Conservative)	
2012	Anne McArdle (Labour)	Ron Abbey (Labour)	Anita Leach (Labour)	
2013 by-election	Ian Lewis (Conservative)	Ron Abbey (Labour)	Anita Leach (Labour)	
2014	Treena Johnson (Labour)	Ron Abbey (Labour)	Anita Leach (Labour)	
2015	Treena Johnson (Labour)	Ron Abbey (Labour)	Anita Leach (Labour)	
2016	Treena Johnson (Labour)	Ron Abbey (Labour)	Anita Leach (Labour)	
2018	Sharon Jones (Labour)	Ron Abbey (Labour)	Anita Leach (Labour)	
2019	Sharon Jones (Labour)	Karl Greaney (Labour/Independent)	Anita Leach (Labour)	
2021	Sharon Jones (Labour)	Karl Greaney (Labour/Independent)	Helen Collinson (Labour)	
2022	Angela Davies (Labour)	Karl Greaney (Labour/Independent)	Helen Collinson (Labour)	
