= Greasby, Frankby and Irby (ward) =

Ward of Wirral, Merseyside, UK

Greasby, Frankby and Irby (previously Caldy and Frankby, 1973 to 1979, and Royden, 1979 to 2004) is a Wirral Metropolitan Borough Council ward in the Wirral West Parliamentary constituency.

== Councillors ==
Election	Councillor (Party)	Councillor (Party)	Councillor (Party)	Ref.
1973	W. Lloyd (Conservative)	Burrows (Conservative)	Reg Cumpstey (Conservative)	
1975	W. Lloyd (Conservative)	Burrows (Conservative)	Reg Cumpstey (Conservative)	
1976	W. Lloyd (Conservative)	J. Gaughan (Conservative)	Reg Cumpstey (Conservative)	
1978	W. Lloyd (Conservative)	J. Gaughan (Conservative)	Reg Cumpstey (Conservative)	
1979	W. Lloyd (Conservative)	J. Gaughan (Conservative)	Reg Cumpstey (Conservative)	
1980	W. Lloyd (Conservative)	J. Gaughan (Conservative)	Reg Cumpstey (Conservative)	
1982	W. Lloyd (Conservative)	J. Gaughan (Conservative)	Reg Cumpstey (Conservative)	
1983	W. Lloyd (Conservative)	J. Gaughan (Conservative)	Reg Cumpstey (Conservative)	
1984	W. Lloyd (Conservative)	Derek Robinson (Conservative)	Reg Cumpstey (Conservative)	
1986	W. Lloyd (Conservative)	Derek Robinson (Conservative)	Reg Cumpstey (Conservative)	
1987	W. Lloyd (Conservative)	Derek Robinson (Conservative)	Reg Cumpstey (Conservative)	
1988	W. Lloyd (Conservative)	Derek Robinson (Conservative)	Reg Cumpstey (Conservative)	
1990	W. Lloyd (Conservative)	Derek Robinson (Conservative)	Reg Cumpstey (Conservative)	
1991	W. Lloyd (Conservative)	Derek Robinson (Conservative)	C. Kevan (Conservative)	
1992	W. Lloyd (Conservative)	Derek Robinson (Conservative)	C. Kevan (Conservative)	
1994	Laurence Jones (Conservative)	Derek Robinson (Conservative)	C. Kevan (Conservative)	
1995	Laurence Jones (Conservative)	Derek Robinson (Conservative)	C. Kevan (Conservative)	
1996	Laurence Jones (Conservative)	Derek Robinson (Conservative)	C. Kevan (Conservative)	
1998	Laurence Jones (Conservative)	Derek Robinson (Conservative)	C. Kevan (Conservative)	
1999	Laurence Jones (Conservative)	Derek Robinson (Conservative)	Geoffrey Watt (Conservative)	
2000	Laurence Jones (Conservative)	Peter Reisdorf (Liberal Democrats)	Geoffrey Watt (Conservative)	
2002	Laurence Jones (Conservative)	Peter Reisdorf (Liberal Democrats)	Geoffrey Watt (Conservative)	
2003	Laurence Jones (Conservative)	Peter Reisdorf (Liberal Democrats)	Gill Gardiner (Liberal Democrats)	
2004	Jean Quinn (Liberal Democrats)	Peter Reisdorf (Liberal Democrats)	Gill Gardiner (Liberal Democrats)	
2006	Jean Quinn (Liberal Democrats)	Peter Reisdorf (Liberal Democrats)	Gill Gardiner (Liberal Democrats)	
2007	Jean Quinn (Liberal Democrats)	Peter Reisdorf (Liberal Democrats)	Gill Gardiner (Liberal Democrats)	
2008	Jean Quinn (Liberal Democrats)	Peter Reisdorf (Liberal Democrats)	Gill Gardiner (Liberal Democrats)	
2010	Wendy Clements (Conservative)	Peter Reisdorf (Liberal Democrats)	Gill Gardiner (Liberal Democrats)	
2011	Wendy Clements (Conservative)	Mike Hornby (Conservative)	Tony Cox (Conservative)	
2012	Wendy Clements (Conservative)	Mike Hornby (Conservative)	Tony Cox (Conservative)	
2014	Wendy Clements (Conservative)	Mike Hornby (Conservative)	Tom Anderson (Conservative)	
2015	Wendy Clements (Conservative)	David Burgess-Joyce (Conservative) /Independent)	Tom Anderson (Conservative)	
2016	Wendy Clements (Conservative)	David Burgess-Joyce (Conservative) /Independent)	Tom Anderson (Conservative)	
2018	Wendy Clements (Conservative)	David Burgess-Joyce (Conservative) /Independent)	Tom Anderson (Conservative)	
2019	Wendy Clements (Conservative)	David Burgess-Joyce (Conservative) /Independent)	Tom Anderson (Conservative)	
2021	Wendy Clements (Conservative)	David Burgess-Joyce (Conservative) /Independent)	Tom Anderson (Conservative)	
2022	Tracy Elzeiny (Conservative)	David Burgess-Joyce (Conservative) /Independent)	Tom Anderson (Conservative)	
