= Rock Ferry (ward) =

Electoral ward of Wirral, Merseyside, England

Rock Ferry within Wirral

Rock Ferry (previously Bebington and Mersey, 1973 to 1979, and Tranmere, 1979 to 2004) is a Wirral Metropolitan Borough Council ward in the Birkenhead Parliamentary constituency.

== Councillors ==
Election	Councillor (Party)	Councillor (Party)	Councillor (Party)	Ref.
1973	S. Kellett (Labour)	Bagnall (Labour)	A. Price (Labour)	
1975	S. Kellett (Labour)	Bagnall (Labour)	L. Welsh (Conservative)	
1976	S. Kellett (Labour)	H. Welsh (Conservative)	L. Welsh (Conservative)	
1978	S. Kellett (Labour)	H. Welsh (Conservative)	L. Welsh (Conservative)	
1979	S. Kellett (Labour)	H. Welsh (Conservative)	Walter Smith (Labour)	
1980	S. Kellett (Labour)	Bill Nock (Labour)	Walter Smith (Labour)	
1982	S. Kellett (Labour)	Bill Nock (Labour)	Walter Smith (Labour)	
1983	S. Kellett (Labour)	Bill Nock (Labour)	Geoff Barker (Labour)	
1984	S. Kellett (Labour)	R. Davies (Labour)	Geoff Barker (Labour)	
1986	Bill Davies (Labour /Independent)	R. Davies (Labour)	Geoff Barker (Labour)	
1987	Bill Davies (Labour /Independent)	R. Davies (Labour)	Geoff Barker (Labour)	
1988	Bill Davies (Labour /Independent)	R. Davies (Labour)	Geoff Barker (Labour)	
1990	Bill Davies (Labour /Independent)	R. Davies (Labour)	Geoff Barker (Labour)	
1991	Bill Davies (Labour /Independent)	R. Davies (Labour)	Chris Meaden (Labour /Independent)	
1992	Bill Davies (Labour /Independent)	R. Davies (Labour)	Chris Meaden (Labour /Independent)	
1994	Bill Davies (Labour /Independent)	R. Davies (Labour)	Chris Meaden (Labour /Independent)	
1995	Bill Davies (Labour /Independent)	R. Davies (Labour)	Chris Meaden (Labour /Independent)	
1996	Bill Davies (Labour /Independent)	Moira McLaughlin (Labour /Independent)	Chris Meaden (Labour /Independent)	
1998	Bill Davies (Labour /Independent)	Moira McLaughlin (Labour /Independent)	Chris Meaden (Labour /Independent)	
1999	Bill Davies (Labour /Independent)	Moira McLaughlin (Labour /Independent)	Chris Meaden (Labour /Independent)	
2000	Bill Davies (Labour /Independent)	Moira McLaughlin (Labour /Independent)	Chris Meaden (Labour /Independent)	
2002	Bill Davies (Labour /Independent)	Moira McLaughlin (Labour /Independent)	Chris Meaden (Labour /Independent)	
2003	Bill Davies (Labour /Independent)	Moira McLaughlin (Labour /Independent)	Chris Meaden (Labour /Independent)	
2004	Bill Davies (Labour /Independent)	Moira McLaughlin (Labour /Independent)	Chris Meaden (Labour /Independent)	
2006	Bill Davies (Labour /Independent)	Moira McLaughlin (Labour /Independent)	Chris Meaden (Labour /Independent)	
2007	Bill Davies (Labour /Independent)	Moira McLaughlin (Labour /Independent)	Chris Meaden (Labour /Independent)	
2008	Bill Davies (Labour /Independent)	Moira McLaughlin (Labour /Independent)	Chris Meaden (Labour /Independent)	
2010	Bill Davies (Labour /Independent)	Moira McLaughlin (Labour /Independent)	Chris Meaden (Labour /Independent)	
2011	Bill Davies (Labour /Independent)	Moira McLaughlin (Labour /Independent)	Chris Meaden (Labour /Independent)	
2012	Bill Davies (Labour /Independent)	Moira McLaughlin (Labour /Independent)	Chris Meaden (Labour /Independent)	
2014	Bill Davies (Labour /Independent)	Moira McLaughlin (Labour /Independent)	Chris Meaden (Labour /Independent)	
2015	Bill Davies (Labour /Independent)	Moira McLaughlin (Labour /Independent)	Chris Meaden (Labour /Independent)	
2016	Bill Davies (Labour /Independent)	Moira McLaughlin (Labour /Independent)	Chris Meaden (Labour /Independent)	
2018	Bill Davies (Labour /Independent)	Moira McLaughlin (Labour /Independent)	Chris Meaden (Labour /Independent)	
2019	Bill Davies (Labour /Independent)	Moira McLaughlin (Labour /Independent)	Yvonne Nolan (Labour /Independent)	
2021	Clare O'Hagan (Labour /Independent)	Moira McLaughlin (Labour /Independent)	Yvonne Nolan (Labour /Independent)	
2022	Clare O'Hagan (Labour /Independent)	Christopher Davies (Labour) /Independent)	Yvonne Nolan (Labour /Independent)	
