= Mayor of Wirral =

Civic Mayor of the Metropolitan Borough of Wirral
- Incumbent; Brian Kenny since 15 May 2025
- Appointer: Wirral Metropolitan Borough Council
- Term length: 1 year
- Inaugural holder: Doris Sisson
- Formation: 1974
- Website: Mayor of Wirral

The Mayor of Wirral (or Civic Mayor of Wirral) is a ceremonial post elected annually, along with a deputy, by Wirral Metropolitan Borough Council.

The role of the mayor includes chairing council meetings, representing the Borough at civic functions, supporting local charities and conferring Honorary Freemen and Aldermen.

The incumbent mayor is Brian Kenny.

== Controversies ==
On 2 June 2014, 5 councillors (4 Conservative and 1 Green) voted against former leader of the council Steve Foulkes's nomination for mayor with a further 10 (all Conservative) abstaining. Leader of the Council Phil Davies said afterwards “It leaves a bad taste in the mouth, it was just grandstanding by the Tories.” Green councillor Pat Clearly wrote in his blog “On Monday [2 June], Wirral elects its new Mayor. Normally, a routine vote where a long standing councillor is elected with cross party support…but, this year is different as the Mayor elect is Steve Foulkes who was Council Leader when Wirral became very publicly associated with incompetence, bullying, gagging clauses, resignations and bad financial management”.

== List of mayors of Wirral ==
=== 20th century ===
No.	Year	Name	Party
1	1974	Doris Sisson	Conservative
2	1975	Ken Fox	Labour
3	1976	John Evans	Liberal
4	1977	Tim Richmond	Conservative
5	1978	Jack Redhead	Conservative
6	1979	Bill Wells	Labour
7	1980	Frank Theaker	Conservative
8	1981	Dorothy Goodfellow	Conservative
9	1982	Bill Lungley	Labour
10	1983	Harry Deverill	Conservative
11	1984	Michael Moore	Conservative
12	1985	Gordon Lindsay	Alliance
13	1986	David Williams	Conservative
14	1987	Arthur Smith	Labour
15	1988	Reg Cumpstey	Conservative
16	1989	Mike Cooke	SLD
17	1990	Jim Edwards	Independent Labour
18	1991	Gordon Paterson	Labour
19	1992	Frank Jones	Conservative
20	1993	Peter Corcoran	Labour
21	1994	Sid Dunn	Conservative
22	1995	Walter Smith	Labour
23	1996	Myrra Lea	Conservative
24	1997	Barney Gilfoyle	Labour
25	1998	Margaret Green	Labour
26	1999	Hugh Lloyd	Labour

=== 21st century ===
No.	Year	Name	Party
27	2000	Kate Wood	Conservative
28	2001	John Cocker	Labour
29	2002	Pat Williams	Liberal Democrats
30	2003	Bill Nock	Labour
31	2004	Hilary Jones	Conservative
31	2004	Hilary Jones	Independent
31	2004	Hilary Jones	UKIP
32	2005	Chris Meaden	Labour
33	2006	Peter Johnson	Conservative
34	2007	Phil Gilchrist	Liberal Democrats
35	2008	Adrian Jones	Labour
36	2009	Andrew Hodson	Conservative
37	2010	Alan Jennings	Liberal Democrats
38	2011	Moira McLaughlin	Labour
39	2012	Gerry Ellis	Conservative
40	2013	Dave Mitchell	Liberal Democrats
41	2014	Steve Foulkes	Labour
42	2015	Les Rowlands	Conservative
43	2016	Pat Hackett	Labour
44	2017	Ann McLachlan	Labour
45	2018	Geoffrey Watt	Conservative
46	2019	Tony Smith	Labour
47	2021	George Davies	Labour
48	2022	Jeff Green	Conservative
49	2023	Jerry Williams	Labour
50	2024	Cherry Povall	Conservative
51	2025	Brian Kenny	Labour
52	2026	Mary Jordan	Conservative

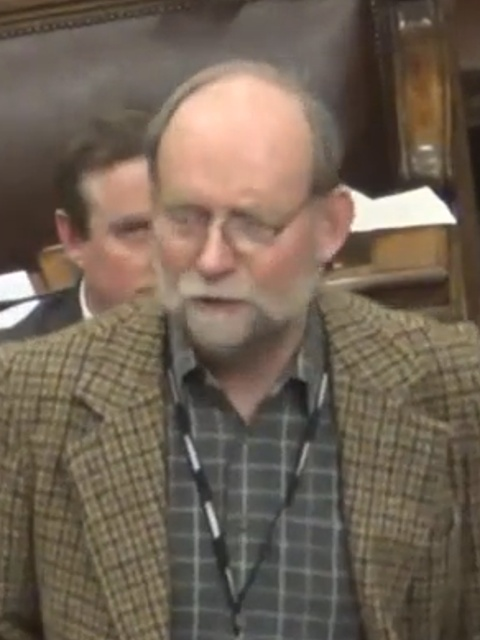
Phil Gilchrist, 34th Mayor of Wirral

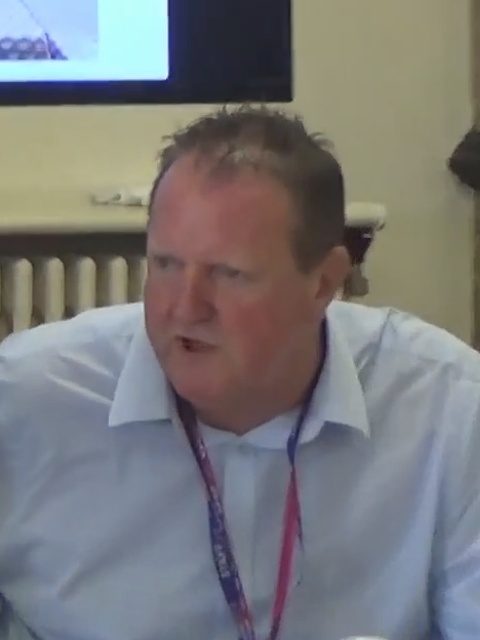
Steve Foulkes, 41st Mayor of Wirral

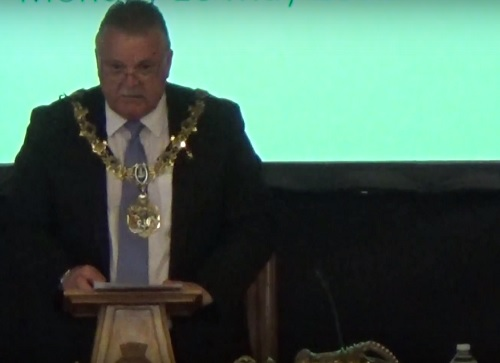
Les Rowlands, 42nd Mayor of Wirral

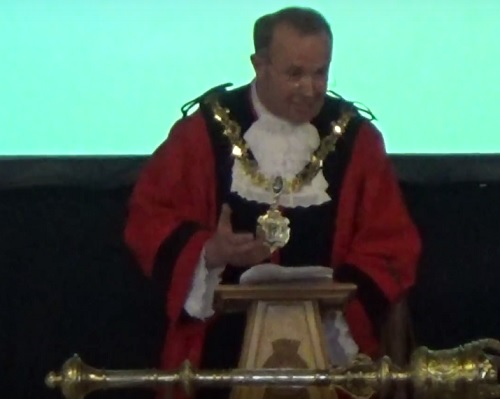
Pat Hackett, 43rd Mayor of Wirral

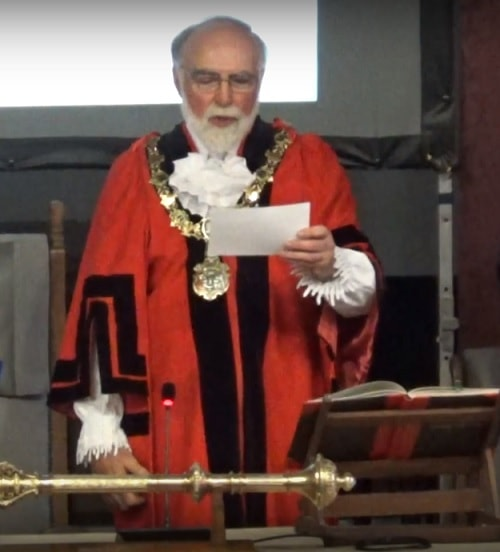
Geoffrey Watt, 45th Mayor of Wirral
