= Pat Hackett =

British politician (born 1954)

Cllr Pat Hackett
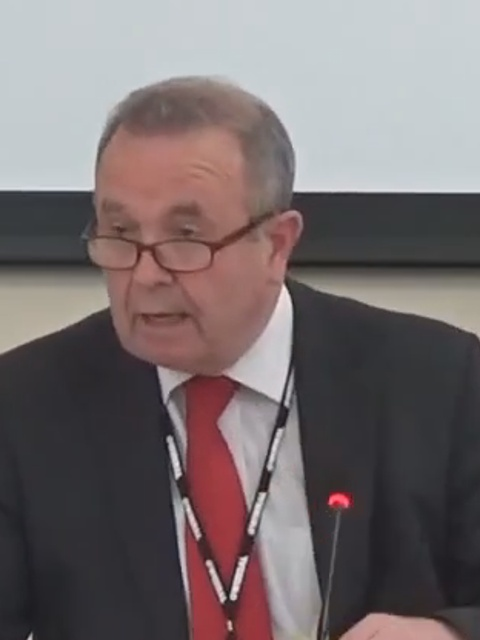
- Hackett in 2019

Leader of Wirral Metropolitan Borough Council
- In office 14 May 2019 – 28 September 2020
- Deputy: Anita Leech
- Preceded by: Phil Davies
- Succeeded by: Janette Williamson

Labour Party Group Leader on Wirral Metropolitan Borough Council
- In office 5 May 2019 – 29 June 2020
- Deputy: Janette Williamson
- Preceded by: Phil Davies
- Succeeded by: Janette Williamson

43rd Mayor of Wirral
- In office 16 May 2016 – 15 May 2017
- Deputy: Ann McLachlan
- Preceded by: Les Rowlands
- Succeeded by: Ann McLachlan

Wirral Metropolitan Borough Councillor for New Brighton
- In office 5 May 2011 – 30 September 2020
- Preceded by: Tony Pritchard
- Succeeded by: TBD
- Majority: 1,566 (39.7%)
- In office 5 May 1994 – 1 May 2008
- Preceded by: D. Harris
- Succeeded by: Sue Taylor
- Majority: 7 (0.1%)

Personal details
- Born: Patrick Joseph Hackett; 9 June 1954 (age 72)
- Party: Liberal Democrats (2026-); Labour (until 2026)

Patrick Joseph Hackett (born 9 June 1954), is a British Liberal Democrat politician and former Leader of Wirral Council.

He was elected leader of the Labour group on Wirral Council on 5 May, becoming Leader of the Council at the annual meeting on 14 May leading a minority Labour administration.

Hackett later moved to Dawlish and joined the Liberal Democrats, where he was elected uncontested onto the town council.

== Electoral performance ==
Wirral Council elections
Date of election	Ward	Party	Votes	% of votes	Result
1994	New Brighton	Labour	2,606	51.2	Elected
1998	New Brighton	Labour	1,729	55.7	Elected
2002	New Brighton	Labour	1,692	47.1	Elected
2004	New Brighton	Labour	1,807	39.5	Elected
2008	New Brighton	Labour	1,572	37.4	Not elected
2011	New Brighton	Labour	2,283	49.6	Elected
2015	New Brighton	Labour	3,822	52.5	Elected
2019	New Brighton	Labour	2,248	57.0	Elected

Political offices
Preceded by D. Harris	Councillor for New Brighton; 1994–2008	Succeeded by Sue Taylor
Preceded by Tony Pritchard	Councillor for New Brighton; 2011–2019	Succeeded by TBD
Preceded by Phil Davies	Leader of Wirral Council; 2019–2020	Succeeded by Janette Williamson
Party political offices
Preceded by Phil Davies	Leader of Wirral Council Labour Group; 2019–2020	Succeeded by Janette Williamson
