= Wirral Metropolitan College =

Further and Higher Education College situated on the Wirral Peninsula, England

Coordinates: 53.3929°N 3.0216°W

Wirral Met College
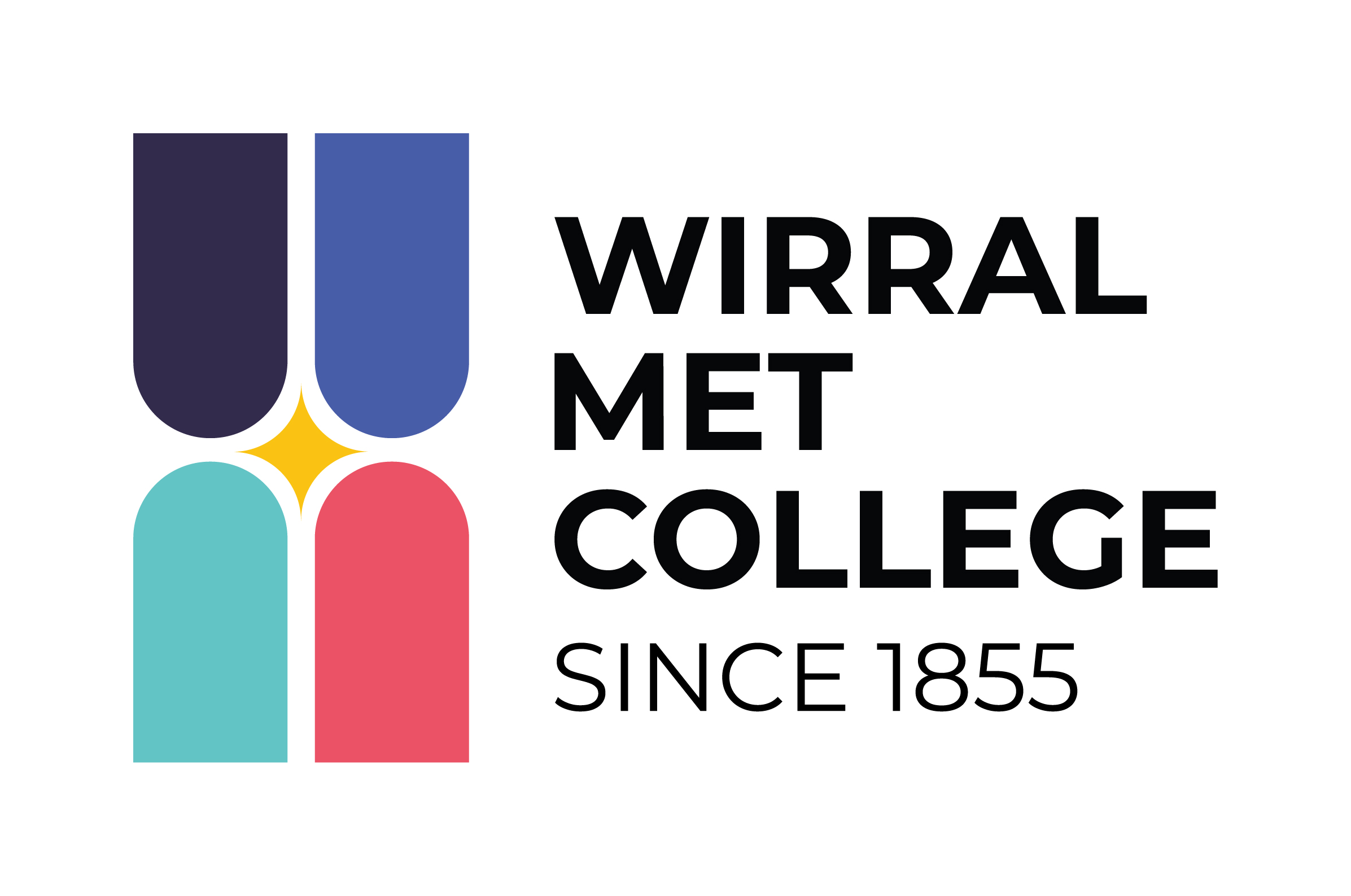
- Wirral Met College Logo

Location
- Europa Boulevard; Birkenhead, Wirral, CH41 4NT; England

Information
- Type: Further and Higher Education
- Established: 1982
- Department for Education URN: 130493 Tables
- Ofsted: Reports
- Principal: Gill Banks
- Gender: Mixed
- Age: 16+
- Website: http://www.wmc.ac.uk

Wirral Met College is a Further and Higher Education College situated on the Wirral Peninsula, in the north-west of England.

== Overview ==
Wirral Met is the largest provider of post 16 learning on the Wirral and is divided into five career-based Campuses:

- Twelve Quays, Birkenhead
- Wirral Waters, Birkenhead
- Conway Park, Birkenhead
- The Oval, Bebington
- Hamilton Campus, Birkenhead

The college has invested £29m in refurbishing and building the campuses, including new facilities at the Oval campus, where it supports delivery of Public Services, Sports and Outdoor Education. The campuses at Conway Park and Twelve Quays in the centre of Birkenhead have been refurbished and they support a whole range of vocational education from entry level to higher education.

The campus completed at Tower Road in Birkenhead, opened in September 2015, the Wirral Waters campus, of approximately 35,000 square feet (3,300 m^{2}), provides courses focusing on construction.

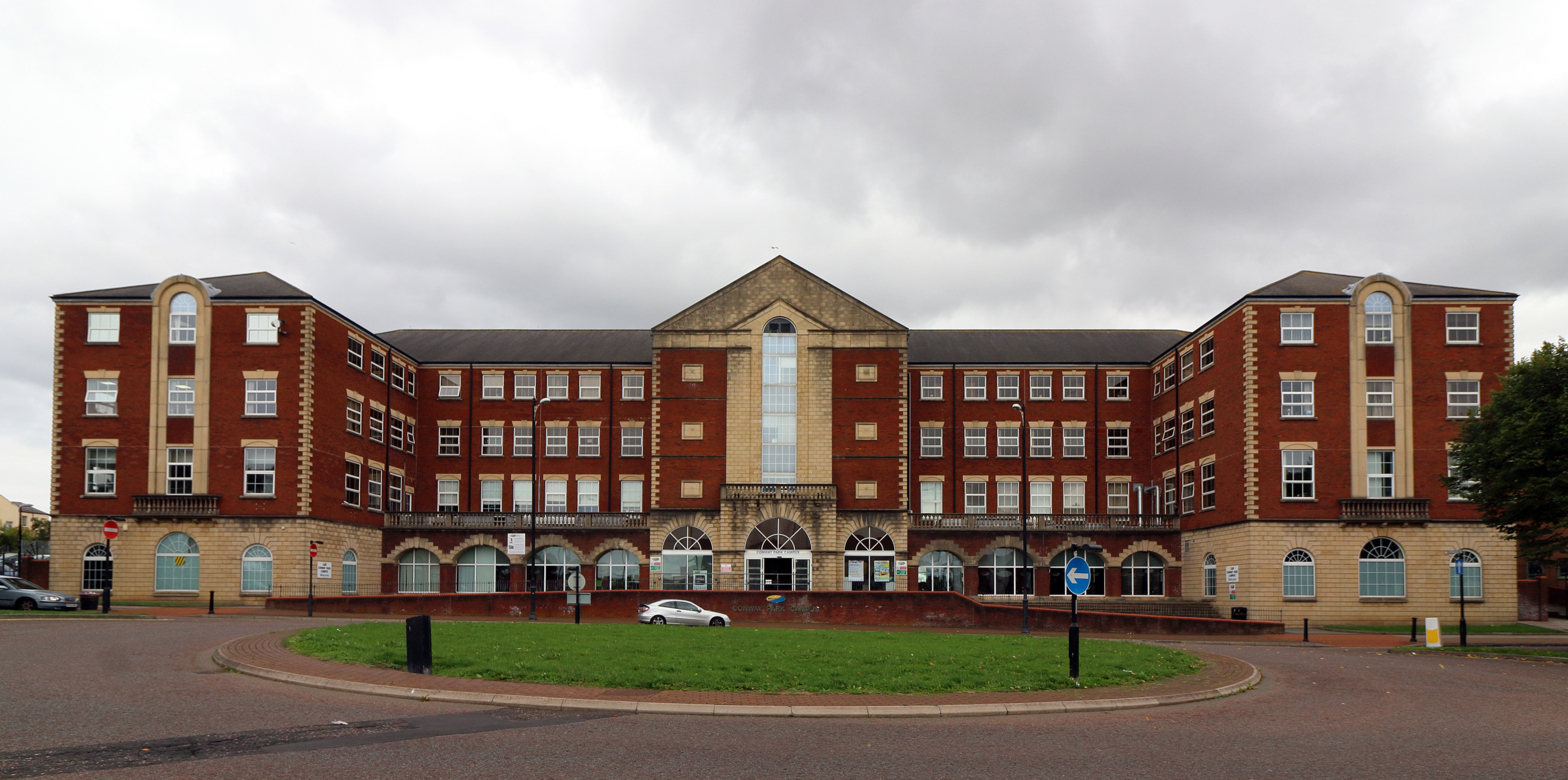
Conway Park campus

Hamilton Campus was opened in September 2021 as the University Campus also housing Trade Union Education.

== Profile ==
Wirral Met College, located in the north-west of England, is a state-funded educational institute of further and higher education. It operates through three main campuses in Wirral, two of which are situated in Birkenhead. Its Twelve Quays Campus, which opened in September 2003, offers recreational facilities for students and comprises a state of the art Science, Technology, Engineering, Arts and Media STEAM Centre, library facilities, study zone, animal care suite, science labs, media and photography studios and art studios.

Further education at Wirral Met College is designed to prepare students for university education or enable them to acquire necessary skills in their chosen areas, such as engineering, accounting, business, and tourism. Additionally, the college also offers a wide range of English language course for students outside the UK, particularly those, who do not have it as their first language.

The college has partnerships with the University of Chester, the University of Liverpool, and the Edge Hill University.

The current Principal and Chief Executive is Gill Banks, who started her role as Principal in August 2023.

== History ==
The college's roots go back to 1855 when Birkenhead Arts School was launched. In the 1970s it merged with Birkenhead College of Technology on Borough Road, Carlett Park College and Withens Lane College in Liscard, which all originated in the 1950s. Wirral Met College was formed in 1982 when all the further education colleges in the Metropolitan Borough of Wirral were amalgamated.

The Glenda Jackson Theatre, on the Borough Road campus of the college in Birkenhead, opened in 1983. It closed in 2003, and was demolished by Wirral Council, to make way for a new housing estate in 2004.

== Statistics ==
The college has 10,000 students with over 2,000 16- to 18-year-olds and 8,000 adults studying full and part-time. c300 students study degree and professional qualifications and the college provides a range of access courses for adults who need to prepare for university level study.

== Notable students ==
- Phil Davies, leader of Wirral Council
- Christian Furr, artist
- Paul O'Grady, TV personality
- Tom Palin, artist
- Ray Stubbs, sports broadcaster
- Pete Price, broadcaster
