= 1994 Wirral Metropolitan Borough Council election =

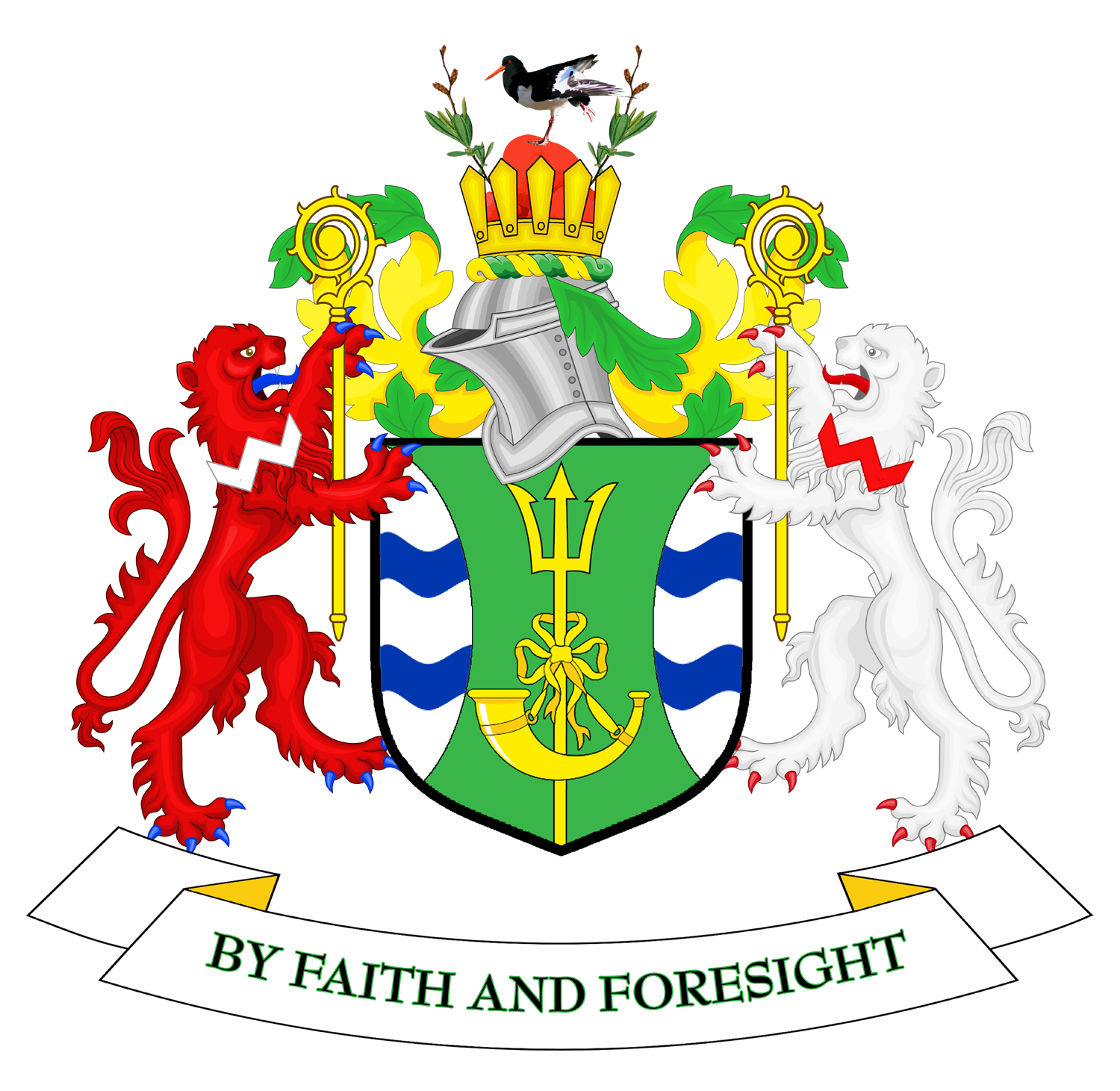
- 5 May 1994

24 of 66 seats (One Third and two by-elections) to Wirral Metropolitan Borough Council 34 seats needed for a majority
- Turnout: 43.0% (▲3.4%)
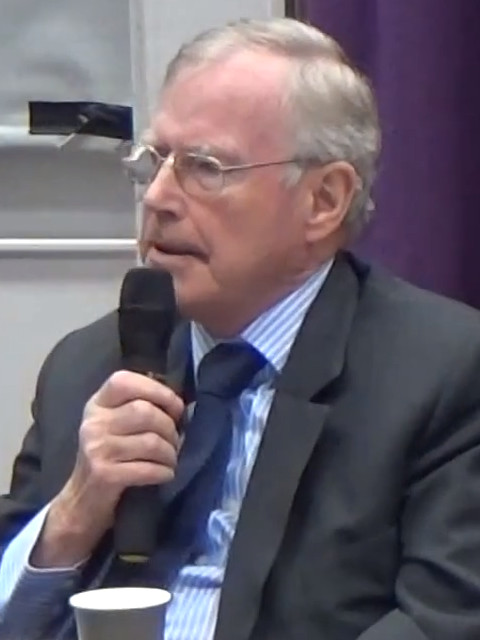

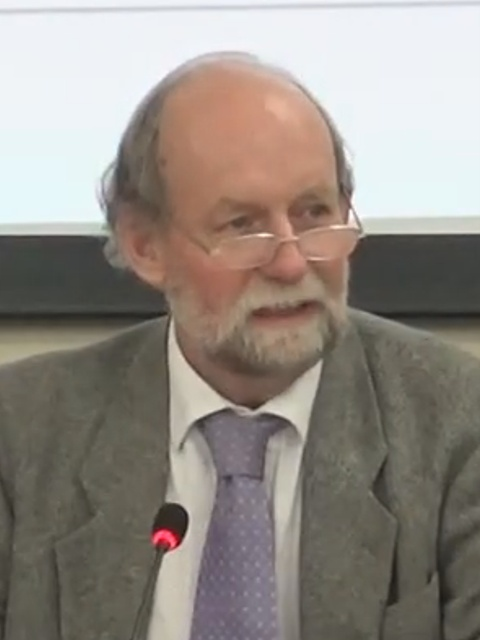
	First party	Second party	Third party
	Lab
Leader	Dave Jackson	John Hale	Phil Gilchrist
Party	Labour	Conservative	Liberal Democrats
Leader's seat	Bromborough	Hoylake	Eastham
Last election	8 seats, 29.9%	12 seats, 50.5%	2 seats, 17.0%
Seats before	30	30	6
Seats won	15	6	3
Seats after	30	28	8
Seat change	Steady	▼2	▲2
Popular vote	50,381	33,283	24,288
Percentage	46.6%	30.8%	22.5%
Swing	▲16.7%	▼19.7%	▲5.5%
- Map of results of 1994 election
Leader of the Council before election
None
No Overall Control
Leader of the Council after election
None
No Overall Control

The 1994 Wirral Metropolitan Borough Council election took place on 5 May 1994 to elect members of Wirral Metropolitan Borough Council in England. This election was held on the same day as other local elections.

After the election, the composition of the council was:

Party	Seats	±
Labour	30	Steady
Conservative	28	▼2
Liberal Democrats	8	▲2

== Election results ==
=== Overall election result ===
Overall result compared with 1992.

Wirral Metropolitan Borough Council election results, 1994
Party	Candidates						Votes		
Party	Stood	Elected	Gained	Unseated	Net	% of total	%	No.	Net %
Labour	24	15	1	1	Steady	59.1	46.6	50,381	▲16.7
Conservative	24	6	0	2	▼2	27.3	30.8	33,283	▼19.7
Liberal Democrats	23	3	2	0	▲2	13.6	22.5	24,288	▲5.5
Green	1	0	0	0	Steady	0.0	0.1	135	▼2.4

(Note: % of total refers to % of wards won.)

== Ward results ==
=== Bebington ===
Bebington
Party	Candidate	Votes	%	±%
Labour	Kathryn Shaughnessy	2,344	43.3	▲16.7
Conservative	A. Green	2,242	41.4	▼21.0
Liberal Democrats	Kevin Turner	830	15.3	▲7.0
Majority		102	1.9	N/A
Registered electors		10,839		
Turnout			50.0	▲7.4
Labour gain from Conservative		Swing	▲18.9	

=== Bidston ===
Bidston
Party	Candidate	Votes	%	±%
Labour	William Nock	2,302	83.8	▲7.0
Liberal Democrats	Francis Doyle	257	9.4	▼8.4
Conservative	M. Vickers	189	6.9	New
Majority		2,045	74.4	▲15.3
Registered electors		8,560		
Turnout			32.1	▲9.1
Labour hold		Swing	▲7.7	

=== Birkenhead ===
Birkenhead
Party	Candidate	Votes	%	±%
Labour	David Christian	3,107	84.4	▲11.4
Liberal Democrats	P. Cooke	303	8.2	▲0.4
Conservative	B. Brassey	270	7.3	▼9.0
Majority		2,804	76.2	▲19.6
Registered electors		10,532		
Turnout			34.9	▲9.4
Labour hold		Swing	▲9.8	

=== Bromborough ===
Bromborough
Party	Candidate	Votes	%	±%
Labour	A. Witter	2,823	61.6	▲17.2
Conservative	K. Roberts	984	21.5	▼21.5
Liberal Democrats	L. Smith	775	16.9	▲6.4
Majority		1,839	40.1	▲38.7
Registered electors		11,227		
Turnout			40.8	▲6.5
Labour hold		Swing	▲19.4	

=== Clatterbridge ===
Clatterbridge
Party	Candidate	Votes	%	±%
Conservative	Myrra Lea	2,794	43.5	▼26.5
Labour	Audrey Moore	2,024	31.5	▲15.4
Liberal Democrats	W. Walsh	1,612	25.1	▲13.3
Majority		770	12.0	▼41.9
Registered electors		14,165		
Turnout			45.4	▲2.6
Conservative hold		Swing	▼21.0	

=== Claughton ===
Claughton
Party	Candidate	Votes	%	±%
Labour	Stephen Foulkes	2,653	53.3	▲14.5
Liberal Democrats	Freda Anderson	1,616	32.4	▼5.2
Conservative	P. Greening-Jackson	711	14.3	▼7.2
Majority		1,037	20.8	▲19.6
Registered electors		10,732		
Turnout			46.4	▲0.7
Labour hold		Swing	▲9.9	

=== Eastham ===
Eastham
Party	Candidate	Votes	%	±%
Liberal Democrats	Thomas Harney	3,019	54.3	▼4.0
Labour	Ann McLachlan	1,761	31.7	▲12.8
Conservative	A. Drury	780	14.0	▼7.5
Majority		1,258	22.6	▼14.2
Registered electors		11,576		
Turnout			48.0	▼0.2
Liberal Democrats gain from Conservative		Swing	▼7.1	

=== Egerton ===
Egerton
Party	Candidate	Votes	%	±%
Labour	Barney Gilfoyle	3,084	71.7	▲23.1
Conservative	Cyrus Ferguson	698	16.2	▼16.2
Liberal Democrats	A. Molyneux	520	12.1	▼4.2
Majority		2,386	55.5	▲39.3
Registered electors		10,852		
Turnout			39.6	▲8.6
Labour hold		Swing	▲19.7	

=== Heswall ===
Heswall
Party	Candidate	Votes	%	±%
Conservative	Andrew Hodson	3,268	58.0	▼19.3
Liberal Democrats	Edward Norton	1,427	25.3	▲13.9
Labour	L. Flanagan	941	16.7	▲7.8
Majority		1,841	32.7	▼33.2
Registered electors		13,326		
Turnout			42.3	▲0.4
Conservative hold		Swing	▼16.6	

=== Hoylake ===
Hoylake
Party	Candidate	Votes	%	±%
Conservative	J. Stedmon	3,049	57.6	▼20.9
Liberal Democrats	A. Richards	1,183	22.3	▲14.0
Labour	Adrian Jones	1,062	20.1	▲10.1
Majority		1,866	35.2	▼33.2
Registered electors		12,619		
Turnout			42.0	▼1.2
Conservative hold		Swing	▼16.6	

=== Leasowe ===
Leasowe
Party	Candidate	Votes	%	±%
Labour	Paul O'Connor (Note: Elected to serve a 4-year term.)	2,455	71.7	▲15.5
Labour	M. Davies (Note: Elected to serve a 2-year term.)	2,239	–	–
Labour	M. Keenan (Note: Elected to serve a 1-year term.)	2,192	–	–
Conservative	G. Beattie	587	17.1	▼20.2
Conservative	Geoffrey Caton	575	–	–
Conservative	B. Howden	535	–	–
Liberal Democrats	B. Thomas	382	11.2	▲4.7
Liberal Democrats	Moira Gallagher	337	–	–
Liberal Democrats	B. Price	295	–	–
Majority		1,868	54.6	▲35.7
Registered electors		9,598		
Turnout			35.7	▲6.0
Labour hold		Swing	▲17.9	
Labour hold		Swing	–	
Labour hold		Swing	–	

=== Liscard ===
Liscard
Party	Candidate	Votes	%	±%
Labour	Gordon Paterson	3,020	61.0	▲19.7
Conservative	P. Buzzard	1,334	26.9	▼20.6
Liberal Democrats	M. Todd	596	12.0	▲3.6
Majority		1,686	34.1	N/A
Registered electors		11,297		
Turnout			43.8	▲2.0
Labour hold		Swing	▲20.2	

=== Moreton ===
Moreton
Party	Candidate	Votes	%	±%
Labour	M. Groves	2,763	57.5	▲23.4
Conservative	Patricia Jones	1,621	33.7	▼23.1
Liberal Democrats	Susanne Uriel	423	8.8	▲4.8
Majority		1,142	23.8	N/A
Registered electors		9,596		
Turnout			50.1	▲5.4
Labour hold		Swing	▲23.3	

=== New Brighton ===
New Brighton
Party	Candidate	Votes	%	±%
Labour	Patrick Hackett	2,606	51.2	▲18.6
Conservative	N. Joynson	1,639	32.2	▼21.0
Liberal Democrats	John Codling	841	16.5	▲6.9
Majority		967	19.0	N/A
Registered electors		11,502		
Turnout			44.2	▲2.5
Labour hold		Swing	▲19.8	

=== Oxton ===
Oxton
Party	Candidate	Votes	%	±%
Liberal Democrats	Gordon Lindsay	3,087	58.6	▲17.0
Labour	Keith Williams	1,345	25.6	▲9.8
Conservative	Vera Ruck (Note: Incumbent councillor for Eastham ward.)	832	15.8	▼24.8
Majority		1,742	33.1	▲32.1
Registered electors		11,836		
Turnout			44.5	▲3.6
Liberal Democrats hold		Swing	▲16.0	

=== Prenton ===
Prenton
Party	Candidate	Votes	%	±%
Liberal Democrats	John Thornton	3,239	50.3	▲9.8
Labour	John Cocker	1,643	25.5	▲8.2
Conservative	D. Morton	1,554	24.1	▼17.1
Majority		1,596	24.8	N/A
Registered electors		11,707		
Turnout			55.0	▲3.2
Liberal Democrats gain from Labour		Swing	▲12.8	

=== Royden ===
Royden
Party	Candidate	Votes	%	±%
Conservative	Laurence Jones	2,683	51.2	▼23.6
Labour	R. Pennington	1,337	25.5	▲13.0
Liberal Democrats	Peter Reisdorf	1,219	23.3	▲13.7
Majority		1,346	25.7	▼36.6
Registered electors		12,658		
Turnout			41.4	▼0.8
Conservative hold		Swing	▼18.3	

=== Seacombe ===
Seacombe
Party	Candidate	Votes	%	±%
Labour	Janet Jackson	3,443	79.1	▲13.4
Conservative	B. Bartlett	503	11.6	▼14.9
Liberal Democrats	M. Wright	407	9.3	▲3.6
Majority		2,940	67.5	▲28.3
Registered electors		11,232		
Turnout			38.8	▲5.0
Labour hold		Swing	▲14.2	

=== Thurstaston ===
Thurstaston
Party	Candidate	Votes	%	±%
Conservative	Mark Hughes	3,049	60.2	▼14.8
Labour	Denis Knowles	2,012	39.8	▲26.6
Majority		1,037	20.5	▼41.2
Registered electors		12,580		
Turnout			40.2	▼0.6
Conservative hold		Swing	▼20.7	

=== Tranmere ===
Tranmere
Party	Candidate	Votes	%	±%
Labour	William Davies	2,790	81.8	▲15.8
Liberal Democrats	Stephen Blaylock	273	7.9	▼2.1
Conservative	C. Bowditch	243	7.1	▼13.8
Green	Nigel Birchenough	135	3.9	▲0.1
Majority		2,517	73.1	▲28.7
Registered electors		9,868		
Turnout			34.9	▲11.6
Labour hold		Swing	▲14.4	

=== Upton ===
Upton
Party	Candidate	Votes	%	±%
Labour	Hugh Lloyd	3,136	53.9	▲18.3
Conservative	D. Smith	1,782	30.6	▼25.2
Liberal Democrats	E. Davies	902	15.5	▲8.5
Majority		1,354	23.3	N/A
Registered electors		12,908		
Turnout			45.1	▲0.6
Labour hold		Swing	▲21.8	

=== Wallasey ===
Wallasey
Party	Candidate	Votes	%	±%
Conservative	Michael Howden	2,471	44.3	▼25.8
Labour	A. Sheppard	1,730	31.0	▲14.2
Liberal Democrats	John Uriel	1,377	24.7	▲13.6
Majority		741	13.3	▼40.0
Registered electors		11,998		
Turnout			46.5	▼0.7
Conservative hold		Swing	▼20.0	

== Notes ==
• italics denote the sitting councillor • bold denotes the winning candidate
