= 2006 Wirral Metropolitan Borough Council election =

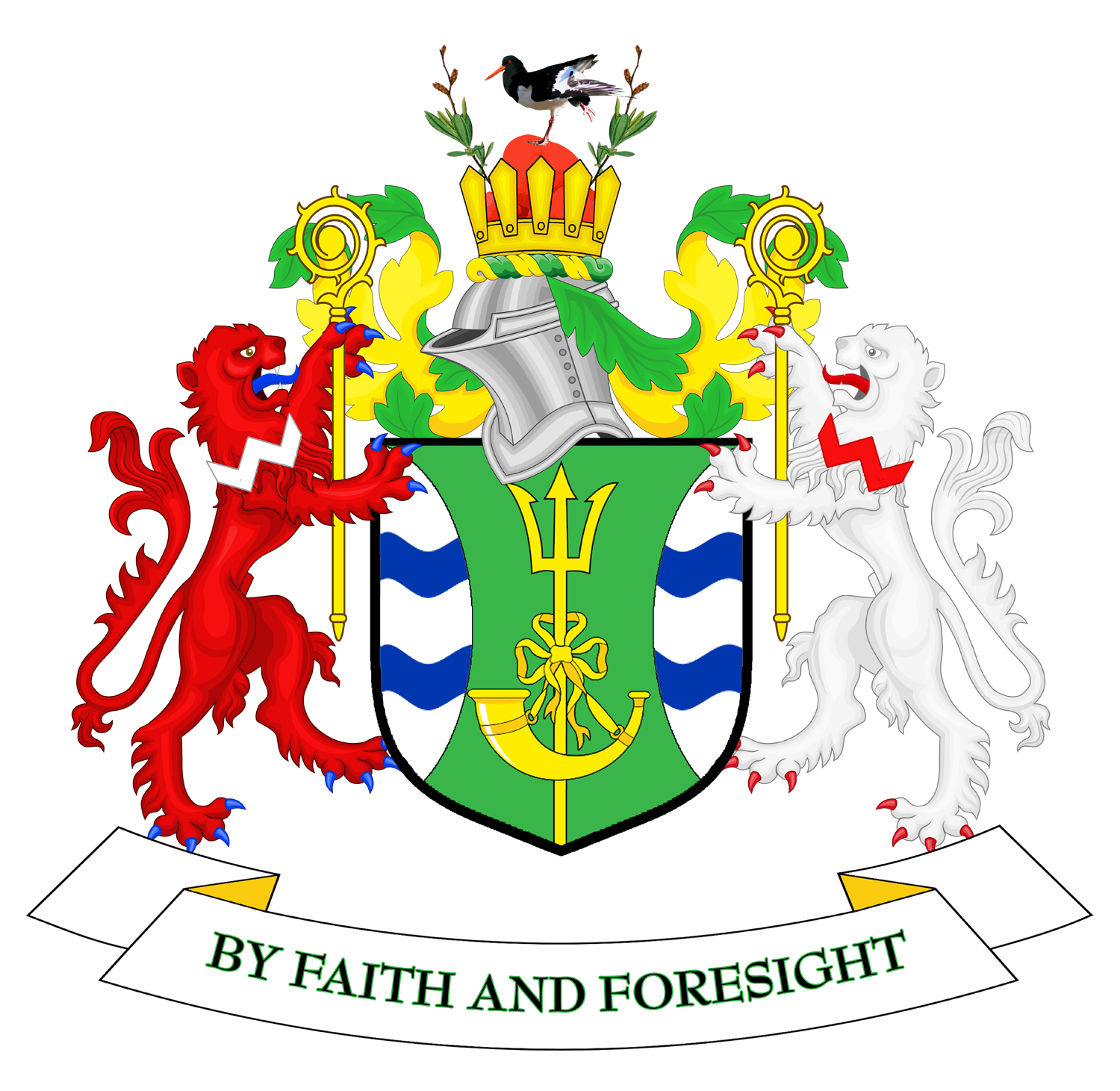
- 4 May 2006

22 of 66 seats (One Third) to Wirral Metropolitan Borough Council 34 seats needed for a majority
- Turnout: 35.2% (▼8.0%)
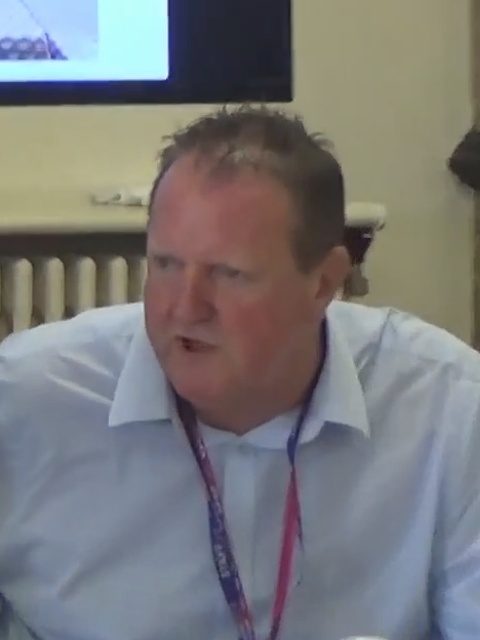

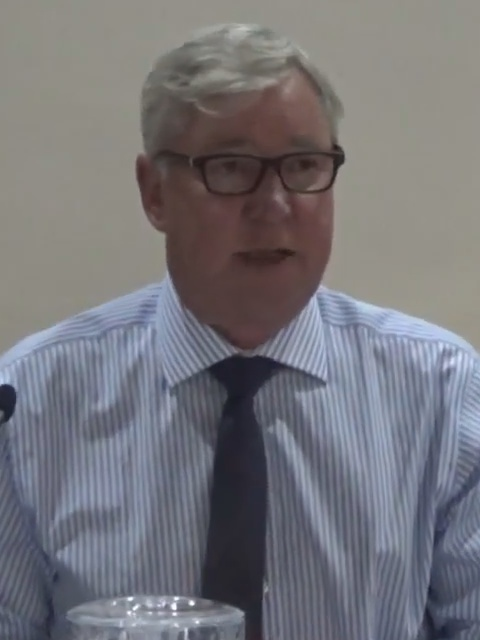

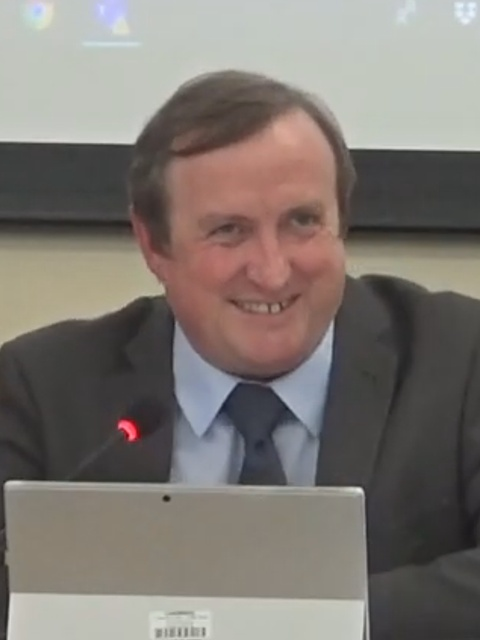
	First party	Second party	Third party
Leader	Steve Foulkes	Jeff Green	Stuart Kelly
Party	Labour	Conservative	Liberal Democrats
Leader's seat	Claughton	West Kirby and Thurstaston	Oxton
Last election	26 seats, 29.6%	21 seats, 33.5%	19 seats, 30.0%
Seats before	26	21	18
Seats won	8	7	7
Seats after	26	21	19
Seat change	Steady	Steady	▲1
Popular vote	23,487	31,839	23,066
Percentage	27.5%	37.3%	27.1%
Swing	▼2.1%	▲3.8%	▼2.9%
- Map of results of 2006 election
Leader of the Council before election
Steve Foulkes (Labour)
No Overall Control
Leader of the Council after election
Steve Foulkes (Labour)
No Overall Control

The 2006 Wirral Metropolitan Borough Council election took place on 4 May 2006 to elect members of Wirral Metropolitan Borough Council in England. This election was held on the same day as other local elections.

After the election, the composition of the council was:

Party	Seats	±
Labour	26	Steady
Conservative	21	Steady
Liberal Democrat	19	▲1
UKIP	0	▼1

== Election results ==
=== Overall election result ===
Overall result compared with 2004.

Wirral Metropolitan Borough Council election result, 2006
Party	Candidates						Votes		
Party	Stood	Elected	Gained	Unseated	Net	% of total	%	No.	Net %
Conservative	22	7	2	2	Steady	31.8	37.3	31,839	▲3.8
Labour	22	8	1	1	Steady	36.4	27.5	23,487	▼2.1
Liberal Democrats	22	7	1	0	▲1	31.8	27.1	23,066	▼2.9
Green	22	0	0	0	Steady	0.0	6.3	5,389	▲0.4
UKIP	3	0	0	1	▼1	0.0	1.0	879	N/A
WIN	1	0	0	0	Steady	0.0	0.4	318	▼0.4
BNP	1	0	0	0	Steady	0.0	0.3	282	▲0.1

== Ward results ==
Results compared directly with the last local election in 2004.

=== Bebington ===
Bebington
Party	Candidate	Votes	%	±%
Labour	Walter Smith	1,730	35.4	▲0.6
Conservative	Leslie Thomas	1,599	32.7	▼2.4
Liberal Democrats	Christopher Jackson	898	18.4	▼1.6
UKIP	Hilary Jones (Note: Incumbent councillor for Hoylake and Meols ward.)	446	9.1	New
Green	Michael Harper	218	4.5	▼5.6
Majority		131	2.7	N/A
Registered electors		11,897		
Turnout			41.2	▼8.0
Labour gain from Conservative		Swing	▲1.5	

=== Bidston and St James ===
Bidston and St James
Party	Candidate	Votes	%	±%
Labour	Ann McLachlan	1,307	63.7	▼4.8
Conservative	Barbara Sinclair	293	14.3	▼0.4
Liberal Democrats	Roy Wood	292	14.2	▼2.6
Green	George Bowler	161	7.8	New
Majority		1,014	49.4	▼2.3
Registered electors		10,097		
Turnout			20.5	▼6.7
Labour hold		Swing	▼1.2	

=== Birkenhead and Tranmere ===
Birkenhead and Tranmere
Party	Candidate	Votes	%	±%
Labour	Brian Kenny	1,119	53.2	▲5.5
WIN	Andrew Dow	318	15.1	▲1.2
Liberal Democrats	Alan Brighouse	303	14.4	▲0.7
Conservative	June Cowin	193	9.2	▲1.3
Green	Catherine Page	170	8.1	▼0.4
Majority		801	38.1	▲4.3
Registered electors		10,137		
Turnout			20.9	▼6.1
Labour hold		Swing	▲2.2	

=== Bromborough ===
Bromborough
Party	Candidate	Votes	%	±%
Liberal Democrats	Alan Taylor	1,827	53.3	▼3.8
Labour	Audrey Moore	924	27.0	▲2.2
Conservative	Jonathan Mackie	487	14.2	▲4.2
Green	Ann Jones	190	5.5	▼0.1
Majority		903	26.8	▼6.0
Registered electors		10,728		
Turnout			32.0	▼9.6
Liberal Democrats hold		Swing	▼3.0	

=== Clatterbridge ===
Clatterbridge
Party	Candidate	Votes	%	±%
Liberal Democrats	Christopher Teggin	2,354	45.3	▼3.0
Conservative	Irene Povall	1,978	38.0	▲5.5
Labour	Andrew Page	702	13.5	▼0.7
Green	Khalid Hussenbux	168	3.2	▼1.9
Majority		376	7.3	▼8.5
Registered electors		11,835		
Turnout			44.1	▼8.8
Liberal Democrats hold		Swing	▼4.3	

=== Claughton ===
Claughton
Party	Candidate	Votes	%	±%
Labour	Denise Roberts	1,590	49.3	▼2.0
Conservative	Peter Hartley	879	27.3	▲1.5
Liberal Democrats	Anna Blumenthal	531	16.5	▲0.3
Green	Joyce Hogg	223	6.9	▲0.3
Majority		711	22.0	▼3.5
Registered electors		11,425		
Turnout			28.3	▼12.1
Labour hold		Swing	▼1.8	

=== Eastham ===
Eastham
Party	Candidate	Votes	%	±%
Liberal Democrats	Thomas Harney	2,924	68.4	▼2.7
Conservative	Barbara Green	637	14.9	▲1.4
Labour	Christopher Lawler	559	13.1	▲1.9
Green	Brian Gibbs	155	3.6	▼0.6
Majority		2,287	53.5	▼4.1
Registered electors		11,066		
Turnout			38.7	▼9.7
Liberal Democrats hold		Swing	▼2.0	

=== Greasby, Frankby and Irby ===
Greasby, Frankby and Irby
Party	Candidate	Votes	%	±%
Liberal Democrats	Jean Quinn	2,690	48.9	▲2.3
Conservative	Kenneth Young	2,032	36.9	▼3.2
Labour	Barbara Moores	591	10.7	▼2.5
Green	Anne Rosseinsky	193	3.5	New
Majority		658	12.0	▲5.5
Registered electors		11,600		
Turnout			47.5	▼5.7
Liberal Democrats hold		Swing	▲2.8	

=== Heswall ===
Heswall
Party	Candidate	Votes	%	±%
Conservative	Stephen Rowlands	3,412	69.6	▲11.5
Liberal Democrats	William Jones	600	12.2	▼6.0
Labour	Philip Waterfield	544	11.1	▼1.3
Green	Ian Barclay	348	7.1	▼4.3
Majority		2,812	57.4	▲17.5
Registered electors		11,040		
Turnout			44.5	▼10.8
Conservative hold		Swing	▲8.8	

=== Hoylake and Meols ===
Hoylake and Meols
Party	Candidate	Votes	%	±%
Conservative	David Kirwan	2,509	59.0	▲5.5
Labour	Stuart Wade	765	18.0	▲1.2
Liberal Democrats	Sarah Quinn	605	14.2	▼6.3
Green	Hara Willow	377	8.9	▼0.3
Majority		1,744	41.0	▲8.0
Registered electors		10,617		
Turnout			40.2	▼10.3
Conservative gain from UKIP		Swing	▲4.0	

=== Leasowe and Moreton East ===
Leasowe and Moreton East
Party	Candidate	Votes	%	±%
Labour	Iris Coates	1,426	45.6	▼7.7
Conservative	Vida Wilson	1,050	33.6	▲0.8
Liberal Democrats	Gerald Hainsworth	406	13.0	▼0.9
Green	Rosemary Bland	243	7.8	New
Majority		376	12.6	▼8.5
Registered electors		10,939		
Turnout			28.6	▼8.4
Labour hold		Swing	▼4.3	

=== Liscard ===
Liscard
Party	Candidate	Votes	%	±%
Conservative	Leah Fraser	2,047	49.9	▲9.2
Labour	Christine Jones	1,396	34.0	▼10.2
Liberal Democrats	Susan Uriel	286	7.0	▼8.1
Green	Lucinda Richardson	209	5.1	New
UKIP	Philip Griffiths	166	4.0	New
Majority		651	15.9	N/A
Registered electors		11,293		
Turnout			36.4	▼2.8
Conservative gain from Labour		Swing	▲9.7	

=== Moreton West and Saughall Massie ===
Moreton West and Saughall Massie
Party	Candidate	Votes	%	±%
Conservative	Simon Mountney	2,154	57.0	▲0.7
Labour	Darren Dodd	973	25.7	▼2.7
Liberal Democrats	Eric Copestake	401	10.6	▼4.7
Green	James Drew	251	6.6	New
Majority		1,181	31.3	▲3.4
Registered electors		10,922		
Turnout			34.7	▼8.9
Conservative hold		Swing	▲1.7	

=== New Brighton ===
New Brighton
Party	Candidate	Votes	%	±%
Conservative	William Duffy	1,622	41.8	▲4.6
Labour	Elizabeth McArdle	1,236	31.8	▼5.5
Green	Cynthia Stonall	546	14.1	▲2.4
Liberal Democrats	Matthew Byrne	479	12.3	▼1.5
Majority		386	10.0	N/A
Registered electors		11,024		
Turnout			35.3	▼6.1
Conservative hold		Swing	▲5.1	

=== Oxton ===
Oxton
Party	Candidate	Votes	%	±%
Liberal Democrats	Paula Southwood	2,067	55.4	▼3.2
Labour	David Barden	646	17.3	▼0.5
Conservative	Tina McDonnell	565	15.1	▲0.1
UKIP	Michael Pepler	267	7.2	New
Green	Garnette Bowler	185	5.0	▼3.7
Majority		1,421	38.1	▼2.7
Registered electors		11,190		
Turnout			33.4	▼4.8
Liberal Democrats hold		Swing	▼1.4	

=== Pensby and Thingwall ===
Pensby and Thingwall
Party	Candidate	Votes	%	±%
Liberal Democrats	Michael Redfern	1,843	40.4	▲7.9
Conservative	Oliver Adam (Note: Elected as a Liberal Democrat. Defected to the Conservatives in 2005.)	1,710	37.5	▲2.5
Labour	John Cunningham	754	16.5	▼6.0
Green	Allen Burton	256	5.6	▼4.5
Majority		133	2.9	N/A
Registered electors		10,745		
Turnout			42.6	▼7.5
Liberal Democrats gain from Conservative		Swing	▲2.7	

=== Prenton ===
Prenton
Party	Candidate	Votes	%	±%
Liberal Democrats	Francis Doyle	1,558	41.5	▼1.4
Labour	Denise Realey	1,215	32.3	▲3.0
Conservative	Susan Percy	753	20.0	▲2.1
Green	Mark Mitchell	232	6.2	▲2.7
Majority		343	9.2	▼4.4
Registered electors		11,038		
Turnout			34.2	▼10.2
Liberal Democrats hold		Swing	▼2.2	

=== Rock Ferry ===
Rock Ferry
Party	Candidate	Votes	%	±%
Labour	Moira McLaughlin	1,405	58.0	▲2.0
Liberal Democrats	Peter Heppinstall	405	16.7	▲0.9
Conservative	Joanne Suffield	404	16.7	▲2.5
Green	Anna Stamp	207	8.6	▼5.3
Majority		1,000	41.3	▲1.1
Registered electors		10,205		
Turnout			23.8	▼6.7
Labour hold		Swing	▲0.6	

=== Seacombe ===
Seacombe
Party	Candidate	Votes	%	±%
Labour	Adrian Jones	1,341	58.2	▼2.8
Conservative	Robert Sherlock	413	17.9	▼1.4
Liberal Democrats	Terence Pitt	344	14.9	▼4.9
Green	Beverley Kells	205	8.9	New
Majority		928	40.3	▼0.9
Registered electors		10,452		
Turnout			22.2	▼7.3
Labour hold		Swing	▼0.4	

=== Upton ===
Upton
Party	Candidate	Votes	%	±%
Labour	John George	1,716	39.1	▼4.4
Conservative	Julie Kirwan	1,424	32.4	▲6.0
Liberal Democrats	Robert Earl	991	22.6	▲0.5
Green	Lesley Hussenbux	262	6.0	▼2.0
Majority		292	6.7	▼10.4
Registered electors		12,170		
Turnout			36.2	▼4.4
Labour hold		Swing	▼5.2	

=== Wallasey ===
Wallasey
Party	Candidate	Votes	%	±%
Conservative	Lesley Rennie	2,907	59.1	▲1.9
Labour	James Crabtree	957	19.5	▼7.9
Liberal Democrats	John Uriel	546	11.1	▼4.3
BNP	John Edwards	282	5.7	New
Green	Perle Sheldricks	228	4.6	New
Majority		1,950	39.6	▲9.8
Registered electors		11,989		
Turnout			41.1	▼7.2
Conservative hold		Swing	▲4.9	

=== West Kirby and Thurstason ===
West Kirby and Thurstaston
Party	Candidate	Votes	%	±%
Conservative	Jeffrey Green	2,771	62.4	▲11.0
Liberal Democrats	Christopher Beazer	716	16.1	▼9.2
Labour	James Brown	591	13.3	▼1.9
Green	Patrick Cleary	362	8.2	▲0.1
Majority		2,055	46.3	▲20.2
Registered electors		10,396		
Turnout			42.9	▼11.7
Conservative hold		Swing	▲10.1	

== Notes ==
• italics denote the sitting councillor • bold denotes the winning candidate
