= Janette Williamson =

British politician

Cllr Janette Williamson
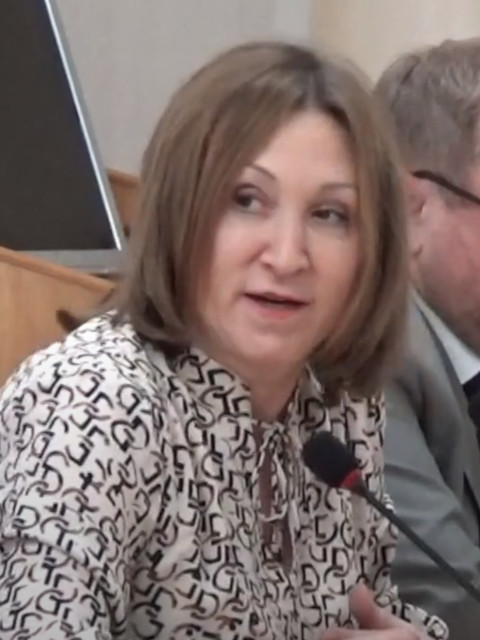
- Williamson in 2020

Leader of Wirral Metropolitan Borough Council
- In office 28 September 2020 – 2023
- Preceded by: Pat Hackett
- Succeeded by: Paul Stuart

Labour Party Group Leader on Wirral Metropolitan Borough Council
- In office 29 June 2020 – 2023
- Deputy: Tom Usher
- Preceded by: Pat Hackett
- Succeeded by: Paul Stuart

Deputy Mayor of the Liverpool City Region
- In role 2021–2023
- Succeeded by: David Baines

Wirral Metropolitan Borough Councillor for Liscard
- Incumbent
- Assumed office 3 May 2012
- Preceded by: James Keeley
- Majority: 1,485 (42.1%)

Personal details
- Born: Janette Williamson; 25 August 1965 (age 61)
- Party: Labour

Janette Williamson (born 1965), is a British Labour politician and former Leader of Wirral Council. She was the first woman to lead the Council in 29 years.

She was elected leader of the Labour group on Wirral Council on 29 June 2020, beating fellow councillors Gillian Wood and Yvonne Nolan. Nolan was last woman to lead the Council between 1990 and 1991.

Williamson became Leader of the Council in a virtual meeting on 28 September with the Council governing under a committee system.

== Controversy ==
In 2012 Williamson was forced to apologise after she was found to have posted an offensive post on social media regarding the death of the Duke of Edinburgh.
