= New Brighton (ward) =

Electoral ward of Wirral, England

New Brighton (previously North Liscard-Upper Brighton Street; 1973 to 1979) is a Wirral Metropolitan Borough Council ward in the Wallasey Parliamentary constituency.

== Councillors ==
Election	Councillor (Party)	Councillor (Party)	Councillor (Party)	Ref.
1973	Jack Redhead (Conservative)	Humphrey-Jones (Conservative)	Malcolm Thornton (Conservative)	
1975	Jack Redhead (Conservative)	Humphrey-Jones (Conservative)	Malcolm Thornton (Conservative)	
1976	Jack Redhead (Conservative)	R. Venner (Conservative)	Malcolm Thornton (Conservative)	
1978	Jack Redhead (Conservative)	R. Venner (Conservative)	Malcolm Thornton (Conservative)	
1979	Jack Redhead (Conservative)	R. Venner (Conservative)	B. Nottage (Conservative)	
1980	Jack Redhead (Conservative)	R. Venner (Conservative)	B. Nottage (Conservative)	
1982	Jack Redhead (Conservative)	R. Venner (Conservative)	B. Nottage (Conservative)	
1983	Jack Redhead (Conservative)	R. Venner (Conservative)	B. Nottage (Conservative)	
1984	Jack Redhead (Conservative)	T. Higgins (Conservative)	B. Nottage (Conservative)	
1986	Jack Redhead (Conservative)	T. Higgins (Conservative)	B. Nottage (Conservative)	
1987	Jack Redhead (Conservative)	P. Buzzard (Conservative)	A. Adams (Conservative)	
1988	Jack Redhead (Conservative)	Colin Penfold (Labour)	A. Adams (Conservative)	
1990	D. Harris (Labour)	Colin Penfold (Labour)	A. Adams (Conservative)	
1991	D. Harris (Labour)	Colin Penfold (Labour)	A. Adams (Conservative)	
1992	D. Harris (Labour)	T. McMahon (Conservative)	A. Adams (Conservative)	
1994	Pat Hackett (Labour)	T. McMahon (Conservative)	A. Adams (Conservative)	
1995	Pat Hackett (Labour)	T. McMahon (Conservative)	M. Keenan (Labour)	
1996	Pat Hackett (Labour)	Vincent McGee (Labour)	M. Keenan (Labour)	
1998	Pat Hackett (Labour)	Vincent McGee (Labour)	M. Keenan (Labour)	
1999	Pat Hackett (Labour)	Vincent McGee (Labour)	Therese Irving (Labour)	
2000	Pat Hackett (Labour)	Tony Pritchard (Conservative)	Therese Irving (Labour)	
2002	Pat Hackett (Labour)	Tony Pritchard (Conservative)	Therese Irving (Labour)	
2003	Pat Hackett (Labour)	Tony Pritchard (Conservative)	Bill Duffey (Conservative)	
2004	Pat Hackett (Labour)	Tony Pritchard (Conservative)	Bill Duffey (Conservative)	
2006	Pat Hackett (Labour)	Tony Pritchard (Conservative)	Bill Duffey (Conservative)	
2007	Pat Hackett (Labour)	Tony Pritchard (Conservative)	Bill Duffey (Conservative)	
2008	Sue Taylor (Conservative)	Tony Pritchard (Conservative)	Bill Duffey (Conservative)	
2010	Sue Taylor (Conservative)	Tony Pritchard (Conservative)	Pat Glasman (Labour)	
2011	Sue Taylor (Conservative)	Pat Hackett (Labour)	Pat Glasman (Labour)	
2012	Robert Gregson (Labour)	Pat Hackett (Labour)	Pat Glasman (Labour)	
2014	Robert Gregson (Labour)	Pat Hackett (Labour)	Christine Spriggs (Labour)	
2015	Robert Gregson (Labour)	Pat Hackett (Labour)	Christine Spriggs (Labour)	
2016	Tony Jones (Labour)	Pat Hackett (Labour)	Christine Spriggs (Labour)	
2018	Tony Jones (Labour)	Pat Hackett (Labour)	Christine Spriggs (Labour)	
2019	Tony Jones (Labour)	Pat Hackett (Labour)	Christine Spriggs (Labour)	
2021	Tony Jones (Labour)	Paul Martin (Labour)	Christine Spriggs (Labour)	
2022	Tony Jones (Labour)	Paul Martin (Labour)	Sue Powell-Wilde (Labour)	
