= Wallasey (ward) =

Electoral ward of Wirral, England

Wallasey (previously New Brighton-Wallasey-Warren, 1973 to 1979) is a Wirral Metropolitan Borough Council ward in the Wallasey Parliamentary constituency.

== Councillors ==
Election	Councillor (Party)	Councillor (Party)	Councillor (Party)	Ref.
1973	N. Thomas (Liberal)	Kate Wood (Liberal /Conservative)	J. Southworth (Liberal)	
1975	N. Thomas (Liberal)	Kate Wood (Liberal /Conservative)	R. Ievers (Conservative)	
1976	N. Thomas (Liberal)	Kate Wood (Liberal /Conservative)	R. Ievers (Conservative)	
1978	P. Moir (Conservative)	Kate Wood (Liberal /Conservative)	R. Ievers (Conservative)	
1979	P. Moir (Conservative)	Kate Wood (Liberal /Conservative)	C. Whatling (Conservative)	
1980	P. Moir (Conservative)	Kate Wood (Liberal /Conservative)	C. Whatling (Conservative)	
1982	P. Moir (Conservative)	Kate Wood (Liberal /Conservative)	C. Whatling (Conservative)	
1983	P. Moir (Conservative)	Kate Wood (Liberal /Conservative)	C. Whatling (Conservative)	
1984	P. Moir (Conservative)	Kate Wood (Liberal /Conservative)	C. Whatling (Conservative)	
1986	P. Moir (Conservative)	Kate Wood (Liberal /Conservative)	C. Whatling (Conservative)	
1987	P. Moir (Conservative)	Kate Wood (Liberal /Conservative)	C. Whatling (Conservative)	
1988	P. Moir (Conservative)	Kate Wood (Liberal /Conservative)	C. Whatling (Conservative)	
1990	Mike Howden (Conservative)	Kate Wood (Liberal /Conservative)	C. Whatling (Conservative)	
1991	Mike Howden (Conservative)	Kate Wood (Liberal /Conservative)	C. Whatling (Conservative)	
1992	Mike Howden (Conservative)	Kate Wood (Liberal /Conservative)	C. Whatling (Conservative)	
1994	Mike Howden (Conservative)	Kate Wood (Liberal /Conservative)	C. Whatling (Conservative)	
1995	Mike Howden (Conservative)	Kate Wood (Liberal /Conservative)	Melanie Iredale (Labour)	
1996	Mike Howden (Conservative)	Kate Wood (Liberal /Conservative)	Melanie Iredale (Labour)	
1997 by-election	Lesley Rennie (Conservative)	Kate Wood (Liberal /Conservative)	Melanie Iredale (Labour)	
1998	Lesley Rennie (Conservative)	Kate Wood (Liberal /Conservative)	Melanie Iredale (Labour)	
1999	Lesley Rennie (Conservative)	Kate Wood (Liberal /Conservative)	Ian Lewis (Conservative)	
2000	Lesley Rennie (Conservative)	Kate Wood (Liberal /Conservative)	Ian Lewis (Conservative)	
2002	Lesley Rennie (Conservative)	Kate Wood (Liberal /Conservative)	Ian Lewis (Conservative)	
2003	Lesley Rennie (Conservative)	Kate Wood (Liberal /Conservative)	Ian Lewis (Conservative)	
2004	Lesley Rennie (Conservative)	Kate Wood (Liberal /Conservative)	David Hunt (Conservative)	
2006	Lesley Rennie (Conservative)	Kate Wood (Liberal /Conservative)	David Hunt (Conservative)	
2007	Lesley Rennie (Conservative)	Kate Wood (Liberal /Conservative)	Paul Hayes (Conservative)	
2008	Lesley Rennie (Conservative)	Kate Wood (Liberal /Conservative)	Paul Hayes (Conservative)	
2010	Lesley Rennie (Conservative)	Kate Wood (Liberal /Conservative)	Paul Hayes (Conservative)	
2011	Lesley Rennie (Conservative)	Kate Wood (Liberal /Conservative)	Paul Hayes (Conservative)	
2012	Lesley Rennie (Conservative)	Leah Fraser (Conservative)	Paul Hayes (Conservative)	
2014	Lesley Rennie (Conservative)	Leah Fraser (Conservative)	Paul Hayes (Conservative)	
2015	Lesley Rennie (Conservative)	Leah Fraser (Conservative)	Paul Hayes (Conservative)	
2016	Lesley Rennie (Conservative)	Ian Lewis (Conservative)	Paul Hayes (Conservative)	
2018	Lesley Rennie (Conservative)	Ian Lewis (Conservative)	Paul Hayes (Conservative)	
2019	Lesley Rennie (Conservative)	Ian Lewis (Conservative)	Paul Hayes (Conservative)	
2021	Lesley Rennie (Conservative)	Ian Lewis (Conservative)	Paul Hayes (Conservative)	
2022	Lesley Rennie (Conservative)	Ian Lewis (Conservative)	Paul Hayes (Conservative)	
