= Bebington (ward) =

Electoral ward in Wirral, England

Bebington Higher Bebington and Woodhey (1973–1979)
- Metropolitan Borough ward for Wirral Council
- Bebington within Wirral
- County: Merseyside
- Population: 15,701 (2018)
- Registered electors: 11,916 (2019)

Current ward
- Created: 1973
- First Round Councillor: Judith Grier (Green)
- Second Round Councillor: Jerry Williams (Labour)
- Third Round Councillor: Jason Walsh (Green)
- Number of Councillors: Three

Overlaps
- UK Parliament constituency: Wirral South

Bebington (previously Higher Bebington and Woodhey, 1973 to 1979) is a ward of Wirral Metropolitan Borough Council in the Birkenhead Parliamentary constituency.

== Councillors ==
Council	Wirral Metropolitan Borough Council				Merseyside County Council		
Election	Councillor (Party)	Councillor (Party)	Councillor (Party)	Ref.	Election	Councillor (Party)	Ref.
1973	Frank Theaker (Conservative)	Tim Richmond (Conservative)	E. Pike (Conservative)		1973	H. Harriman (Conservative)	
1975	Frank Theaker (Conservative)	Tim Richmond (Conservative)	E. Pike (Conservative)		1973	H. Harriman (Conservative)	
1976	Frank Theaker (Conservative)	Tim Richmond (Conservative)	E. Pike (Conservative)		1973	H. Harriman (Conservative)	
1976	Frank Theaker (Conservative)	Tim Richmond (Conservative)	E. Pike (Conservative)		1977	H. Harriman (Conservative)	
1978	Frank Theaker (Conservative)	Tim Richmond (Conservative)	E. Pike (Conservative)		1977	H. Harriman (Conservative)	
1979	Frank Theaker (Conservative)	Tim Richmond (Conservative)	E. Pike (Conservative)		1977	H. Harriman (Conservative)	
1980	Frank Theaker (Conservative)	Tim Richmond (Conservative)	E. Pike (Conservative)		1977	H. Harriman (Conservative)	
1980	Frank Theaker (Conservative)	Tim Richmond (Conservative)	E. Pike (Conservative)		1981	I. Richmond (Conservative)	
1982	Frank Theaker (Conservative)	Tim Richmond (Conservative)	E. Pike (Conservative)		1981	I. Richmond (Conservative)	
1983	Frank Theaker (Conservative)	Tim Richmond (Conservative)	J. Shennan (Conservative)		1981	I. Richmond (Conservative)	
1984	Frank Theaker (Conservative)	Tim Richmond (Conservative)	J. Shennan (Conservative)		1981	I. Richmond (Conservative)	
1984	Frank Theaker (Conservative)	Tim Richmond (Conservative)	J. Shennan (Conservative)		Council abolished 1986–present		
1986	A. Green (Conservative)	Tim Richmond (Conservative)	J. Shennan (Conservative)		Council abolished 1986–present		
1987	A. Green (Conservative)	Tim Richmond (Conservative)	Hilary Jones (Conservative)		Council abolished 1986–present		
1988	A. Green (Conservative)	Brian Cummings (Conservative)	Hilary Jones (Conservative)		Council abolished 1986–present		
1990	A. Green (Conservative)	Brian Cummings (Conservative)	Hilary Jones (Conservative)		Council abolished 1986–present		
1991	A. Green (Conservative)	Brian Cummings (Conservative)	Hilary Jones (Conservative)		Council abolished 1986–present		
1992	A. Green (Conservative)	Brian Cummings (Conservative)	Hilary Jones (Conservative)		Council abolished 1986–present		
1994	Kath Shaughnessy (Labour/Independent)	Brian Cummings (Conservative)	Hilary Jones (Conservative)		Council abolished 1986–present		
1995	Kath Shaughnessy (Labour/Independent)	Brian Cummings (Conservative)	Tony Smith (Labour)		Council abolished 1986–present		
1996	Kath Shaughnessy (Labour/Independent)	Jerry Williams (Labour)	Tony Smith (Labour)		Council abolished 1986–present		
1998	Kath Shaughnessy (Labour/Independent)	Jerry Williams (Labour)	Tony Smith (Labour)		Council abolished 1986–present		
1999	Kath Shaughnessy (Labour/Independent)	Jerry Williams (Labour)	Tony Smith (Labour)		Council abolished 1986–present		
2000	Kath Shaughnessy (Labour/Independent)	Jacqueline Hall (Conservative)	Tony Smith (Labour)		Council abolished 1986–present		
2002	Denise Realey (Labour)	Jacqueline Hall (Conservative)	Tony Smith (Labour)		Council abolished 1986–present		
2003	Denise Realey (Labour)	Jacqueline Hall (Conservative)	Leslie Thomas (Conservative)		Council abolished 1986–present		
2004	Jerry Williams (Labour)	Shelia Clarke (Conservative)	Leslie Thomas (Conservative)		Council abolished 1986–present		
2006	Jerry Williams (Labour)	Shelia Clarke (Conservative)	Walter Smith (Labour)		Council abolished 1986–present		
2007	Jerry Williams (Labour)	Shelia Clarke (Conservative)	Walter Smith (Labour)		Council abolished 1986–present		
2008	Jerry Williams (Labour)	Shelia Clarke (Conservative)	Walter Smith (Labour)		Council abolished 1986–present		
2010	Jerry Williams (Labour)	Shelia Clarke (Conservative)	Walter Smith (Labour)		Council abolished 1986–present		
2011	Jerry Williams (Labour)	Shelia Clarke (Conservative)	Walter Smith (Labour)		Council abolished 1986–present		
2012	Jerry Williams (Labour)	Christina Muspratt (Labour)	Walter Smith (Labour)		Council abolished 1986–present		
2014	Jerry Williams (Labour)	Christina Muspratt (Labour)	Walter Smith (Labour)		Council abolished 1986–present		
2015	Jerry Williams (Labour)	Christina Muspratt (Labour)	Walter Smith (Labour)		Council abolished 1986–present		
2016	Jerry Williams (Labour)	Christina Muspratt (Labour)	Walter Smith (Labour)		Council abolished 1986–present		
2018	Jerry Williams (Labour)	Christina Muspratt (Labour)	Tony Cottier (Labour)		Council abolished 1986–present		
2019	Jerry Williams (Labour)	Christina Muspratt (Labour)	Tony Cottier (Labour)		Council abolished 1986–present		
2021	Jerry Williams (Labour)	Jason Walsh (Green)	Tony Cottier (Labour)		Council abolished 1986–present		
2022	Jerry Williams (Labour)	Jason Walsh (Green)	Judith Grier (Green)				
