= 1998 Wirral Metropolitan Borough Council election =

Local government election in England

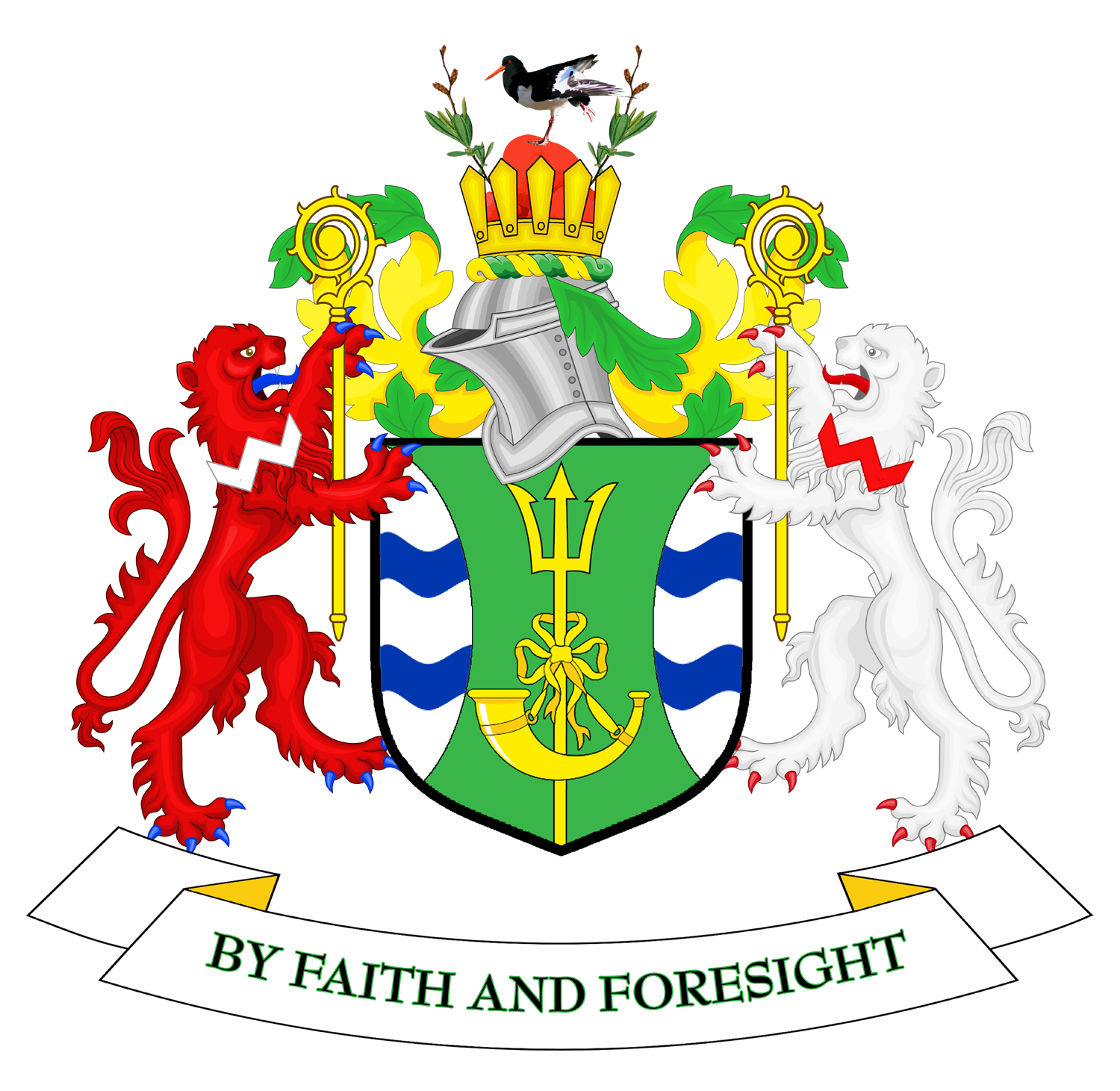
- 7 May 1998

24 of 66 seats (One Third and two by-elections) to Wirral Metropolitan Borough Council 34 seats needed for a majority
- Turnout: 28.1% (▼6.9%)
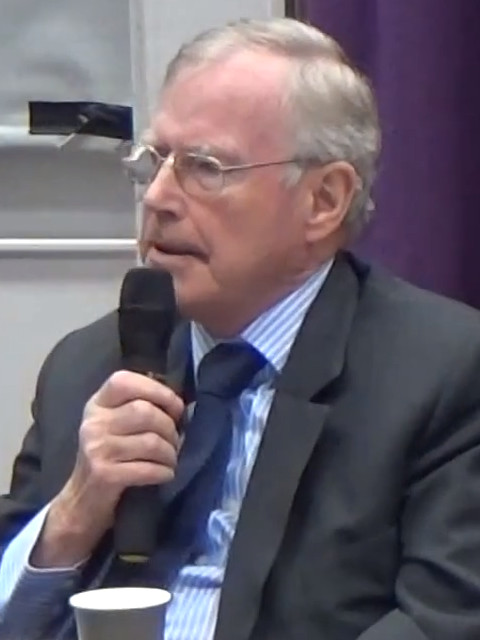

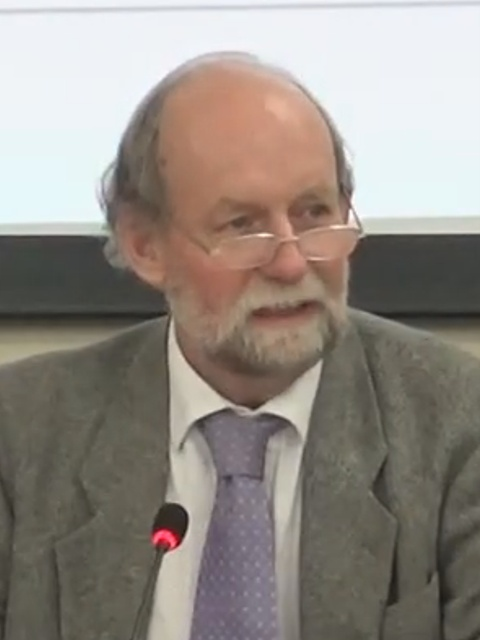
	First party	Second party	Third party
	Lab
Leader	Dave Jackson	John Hale	Phil Gilchrist
Party	Labour	Conservative	Liberal Democrats
Leader's seat	Bromborough	Hoylake	Eastham
Last election	13 seats, 48.9%	6 seats, 30.2%	3 seats, 20.1%
Seats before	41	16	8
Seats won	13	7	4
Seats after	41	16	8
Seat change	Steady	Steady	Steady
Popular vote	29,075	22,856	14,740
Percentage	42.1%	33.1%	21.4%
Swing	▼6.8%	▲2.9%	▲1.3%
- Map of results of 1998 election
Leader of the Council before election
Dave Jackson
Labour
Leader of the Council after election
Dave Jackson
Labour

The 1998 Wirral Metropolitan Borough Council election took place on 7 May 1998 to elect members of Wirral Metropolitan Borough Council in England. This election was held on the same day as other local elections.

After the election, the composition of the council was:

Party	Seats	±
Labour	41	Steady
Conservative	16	Steady
Liberal Democrats	8	Steady
Ind. Lib Dem	1	Steady

== Election results ==
=== Overall election result ===
Overall result compared with 1996.

Wirral Metropolitan Borough Council election results, 1998
Party	Candidates						Votes		
Party	Stood	Elected	Gained	Unseated	Net	% of total	%	No.	Net %
Labour	24	13	0	0	Steady	59.1	42.1	29,075	▼6.8
Conservative	20	7	0	0	Steady	27.3	33.1	22,856	▲2.9
Liberal Democrats	24	4	0	0	Steady	13.6	21.4	14,740	▲1.3
Green	18	0	0	0	Steady	0.0	2.8	1,925	▲2.1
Socialist Labour	3	0	0	0	Steady	0.0	0.6	435	N/A

(Note: % of total refers to % of wards won.)

== Ward results ==
=== Bebington ===
Bebington
Party	Candidate	Votes	%	±%
Labour	Kathryn Shaughnessy	1,933	46.8	▼0.9
Conservative	H. Gow	1,757	42.6	Steady
Liberal Democrats	Nigel Dyer	333	8.1	▲0.1
Green	Ann Jones	104	2.5	▲0.8
Majority		176	4.3	▼0.8
Registered electors		10,693		
Turnout			38.7	▼4.4
Labour hold		Swing	▼0.5	

=== Bidston ===
Bidston
Party	Candidate	Votes	%	±%
Labour	William Nock	1,009	72.5	▼15.9
Socialist Labour	Alec McFadden	183	13.1	New
Liberal Democrats	John Tomlinson	155	11.1	▼0.5
Green	Robert Mitchell	45	3.2	New
Majority		826	59.3	▼17.6
Registered electors		7,994		
Turnout			17.4	▼6.2
Labour hold		Swing	▼8.7	

=== Birkenhead ===
Birkenhead
Party	Candidate	Votes	%	±%
Labour	David Christian	1,351	79.1	▼8.9
Liberal Democrats	Mary Williams	357	20.9	▲8.9
Majority		994	58.2	▼17.9
Registered electors		9,892		
Turnout			17.3	▼7.5
Labour hold		Swing	▼8.9	

=== Bromborough ===
Bromborough
Party	Candidate	Votes	%	±%
Labour	A. Witter	1,742	59.8	▼5.3
Conservative	Jacqueline Hall	640	22.0	▲4.1
Liberal Democrats	M. Bolton	412	14.1	▲3.7
Green	J. Jones	120	4.1	▲1.9
Majority		1,102	37.8	▼9.5
Registered electors		10,662		
Turnout			27.4	▼6.9
Labour hold		Swing	▼4.7	

=== Clatterbridge ===
Clatterbridge
Party	Candidate	Votes	%	±%
Conservative	Brian Cummings	2,344	48.5	▲3.4
Labour	C. Riley	1,578	32.7	▼4.9
Liberal Democrats	Isabel Moon	792	16.4	▼0.8
Green	Michael Harper	115	2.4	New
Majority		766	15.9	▲8.4
Registered electors		13,814		
Turnout			35.0	▼5.0
Conservative hold		Swing	▲4.2	

=== Claughton ===
Claughton
Party	Candidate	Votes	%	±%
Labour	Stephen Foulkes	1,600	55.8	▲4.1
Liberal Democrats	A. Molyneux	637	22.2	▼9.6
Conservative	K. Wise	455	15.9	▲1.5
Socialist Labour	Michael Cullen	99	3.5	New
Green	S. Johnson	76	2.7	▲0.6
Majority		963	33.6	▲13.8
Registered electors		10,644		
Turnout			26.9	▼10.6
Labour hold		Swing	▲6.9	

=== Eastham ===
Eastham
Party	Candidate	Votes	%	±%
Liberal Democrats	Thomas Harney	2,419	62.2	▼2.9
Labour	Jean Stapleton	937	24.1	▼0.5
Conservative	M. Hunt	462	11.9	▲1.6
Green	Brian Gibbs	72	1.9	New
Majority		1,482	38.1	▼2.4
Registered electors		11,083		
Turnout			35.1	▼3.5
Liberal Democrats hold		Swing	▼1.2	

=== Egerton ===
Egerton
Party	Candidate	Votes	%	±%
Labour	Barney Gilfoyle	1,293	58.6	▼16.7
Conservative	Cyrus Ferguson	351	15.9	▲2.5
Liberal Democrats	Philip Lloyd	250	11.3	▲3.5
Green	Catherine Page	161	7.3	▲3.8
Socialist Labour	Nicholas Kearns	153	6.9	New
Majority		942	42.7	▼19.2
Registered electors		10,461		
Turnout			21.1	▼7.7
Labour hold		Swing	▼9.6	

=== Heswall ===
Heswall
Party	Candidate	Votes	%	±%
Conservative	Andrew Hodson (Note: Elected to serve a 4-year term.)	2,850	61.6	▲1.3
Conservative	Stephen Rowlands (Note: Elected to serve a 2-year term.)	2,647	–	–
Labour	L. Flanaghan	1,016	22.0	▲4.5
Labour	A. Terry	900	–	–
Liberal Democrats	Edward Norton	610	13.2	▼9.0
Liberal Democrats	Robert Wilkins	556	–	–
Green	Garnette Bowler	151	3.3	New
Majority		1,834	39.6	▲1.6
Registered electors		13,214		
Turnout			33.7	▼2.0
Conservative hold		Swing	▲0.8	
Conservative hold		Swing	–	

=== Hoylake ===
Hoylake
Party	Candidate	Votes	%	±%
Conservative	Gerald Ellis	2,536	63.6	▲8.1
Labour	E. Harrison	817	20.5	▼7.3
Liberal Democrats	A. Richards	472	11.8	▼4.9
Green	Allen Burton	160	4.0	New
Majority		1,719	43.1	▲15.4
Registered electors		12,130		
Turnout			32.4	▼3.4
Conservative hold		Swing	▲7.7	

=== Leasowe ===
Leasowe
Party	Candidate	Votes	%	±%
Labour	Iris Coates	1,347	71.2	▼5.9
Conservative	G. Beattie	296	15.7	▲0.9
Liberal Democrats	Susanne Uriel	248	13.1	▲5.0
Majority		1,051	55.6	▼6.6
Registered electors		9,072		
Turnout			20.8	▼9.3
Labour hold		Swing	▼3.4	

=== Liscard ===
Liscard
Party	Candidate	Votes	%	±%
Labour	Gordon Paterson	1,334	57.8	▼6.8
Conservative	J. Tooke	569	24.7	▲1.1
Liberal Democrats	M. Wright	404	17.5	▲5.7
Majority		765	33.2	▼7.8
Registered electors		10,939		
Turnout			21.1	▼12.7
Labour hold		Swing	▼4.0	

=== Moreton ===
Moreton
Party	Candidate	Votes	%	±%
Labour	M. Groves	1,449	53.8	▼6.7
Conservative	Ian Lewis	977	36.3	▲3.2
Liberal Democrats	C. Robertson	267	9.9	▲3.5
Majority		472	17.5	▼9.8
Registered electors		9,653		
Turnout			27.9	▼9.2
Labour hold		Swing	▼5.0	

=== New Brighton ===
New Brighton
Party	Candidate	Votes	%	±%
Labour	Patrick Hackett	1,729	55.7	▼3.6
Conservative	Anthony Pritchard	965	31.1	▲2.2
Liberal Democrats	John Codling	310	10.0	▼1.8
Green	George Bowler	102	3.3	New
Majority		764	24.6	▼5.8
Registered electors		11,306		
Turnout			27.5	▼4.3
Labour hold		Swing	▼2.9	

=== Oxton ===
Oxton
Party	Candidate	Votes	%	±%
Liberal Democrats	Stuart Kelly	1,913	54.7	▼1.6
Liberal Democrats	Freda Anderson	1,856	–	–
Labour	Anna McLaughlin	804	23.0	▼5.5
Labour	Denise Roberts	771	–	–
Conservative	Leonard Moore	587	16.8	▲3.5
Green	Pamela Mitchell	193	5.5	▲3.6
Majority		1,109	31.7	▲3.9
Registered electors		11,282		
Turnout			27.1	▼7.9
Liberal Democrats hold		Swing	▲2.0	
Liberal Democrats hold		Swing	–	

=== Prenton ===
Prenton
Party	Candidate	Votes	%	±%
Liberal Democrats	John Thornton	2,343	56.8	▲9.0
Labour	Ray Pullen	1,042	25.2	▼8.0
Conservative	David Elderton	679	16.5	▼2.5
Green	Perle Sheldricks	63	1.5	New
Majority		1,301	31.5	▲16.8
Registered electors		11,320		
Turnout			36.5	▼5.7
Liberal Democrats hold		Swing	▲8.5	

=== Royden ===
Royden
Party	Candidate	Votes	%	±%
Conservative	Laurence Jones	1,746	44.7	▼5.4
Liberal Democrats	Peter Reisdorf	1,158	29.7	▲8.5
Labour	R. Pennington	909	23.3	▼5.4
Green	Barbara Burton	89	2.3	New
Majority		588	15.1	▼6.3
Registered electors		12,501		
Turnout			31.2	▼10.3
Conservative hold		Swing	▼3.2	

=== Seacombe ===
Seacombe
Party	Candidate	Votes	%	±%
Labour	Janet Jackson	1,525	73.1	▼9.6
Conservative	L. May	280	13.4	▲5.7
Liberal Democrats	R. Ellett	225	10.8	▲1.2
Green	P. Exley	56	2.7	New
Majority		1,245	59.7	▼13.4
Registered electors		10,743		
Turnout			19.4	▼8.9
Labour hold		Swing	▼6.7	

=== Thurstaston ===
Thurstaston
Party	Candidate	Votes	%	±%
Conservative	Jacqueline McKelvie	2,163	53.2	▲2.1
Labour	A. Beer	1,417	34.9	▼3.6
Liberal Democrats	Charles Wall	388	9.5	▼0.8
Green	Percy Hogg	96	2.4	New
Majority		746	18.4	▲5.8
Registered electors		12,363		
Turnout			32.9	▼6.2
Conservative hold		Swing	▲2.9	

=== Tranmere ===
Tranmere
Party	Candidate	Votes	%	±%
Labour	William Davies	1,328	81.1	▲1.2
Liberal Democrats	Stephen Blaylock	211	12.9	▲6.3
Green	Angela Upton	98	6.0	▲0.1
Majority		1,117	68.2	▼4.1
Registered electors		9,380		
Turnout			17.5	▼6.5
Labour hold		Swing	▼2.1	

=== Upton ===
Upton
Party	Candidate	Votes	%	±%
Labour	Hugh Lloyd	1,790	53.6	▼4.7
Conservative	John Laing	1,034	31.0	▲0.5
Liberal Democrats	Michael Redfern	421	12.6	▲1.5
Green	Joyce Hogg	94	2.8	New
Majority		756	22.6	▼5.2
Registered electors		12,375		
Turnout			27.0	▼8.5
Labour hold		Swing	▼2.6	

=== Wallasey ===
Wallasey
Party	Candidate	Votes	%	±%
Conservative	Lesley Rennie	2,165	56.5	▲6.1
Labour	P. Carrington	1,125	29.3	▼8.9
Liberal Democrats	John Uriel	415	10.8	▼0.6
Green	George Bowler	130	3.4	New
Majority		1,040	27.1	▲14.9
Turnout			32.9	▼8.2
Conservative hold		Swing	▲7.5	

== Changes between 1998 and 1999 ==
Date	Ward	Name	Previous affiliation	New affiliation	Circumstance
June 1998	Prenton	Ed Cunniffe	Ind. Lib Dem	Labour	Defected.

== Notes ==
• italics denote the sitting councillor • bold denotes the winning candidate
