= Wirral Council =

Local authority in England

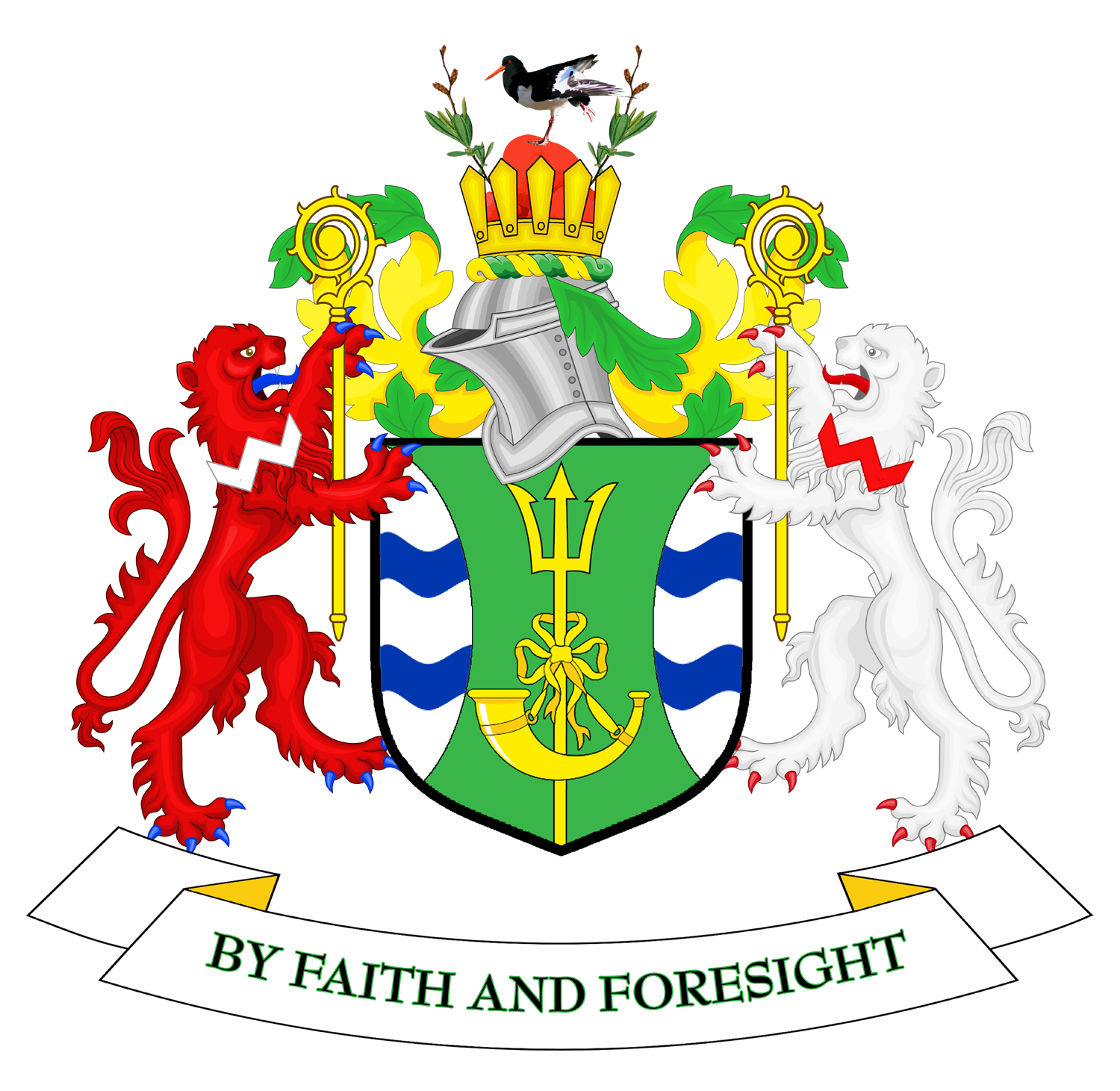
- Coat of arms

- Corporate logo

Type
- Type: Metropolitan district council with borough status

Leadership
- Mayor: Mary Jordan, Conservative since 13 May 2026
- Leader: Paula Basnett, Labour since 21 May 2025
- Chief Executive: Matthew Bennett since October 2025

Structure
- Seats: 66 councillors
- Graph of the party split among 66 seats.
- Political groups: Administration (26) Labour (26) Opposition (40) Conservative (14) Green (14) Liberal Democrat (6) Reform (3) Independent (3)
- Joint committees: Liverpool City Region Combined Authority
- Length of term: 4 years

Elections
- Voting system: First-past-the-post
- Last election: 4 May 2023
- Next election: 6 May 2027

Motto
- By Faith and Foresight

Meeting place
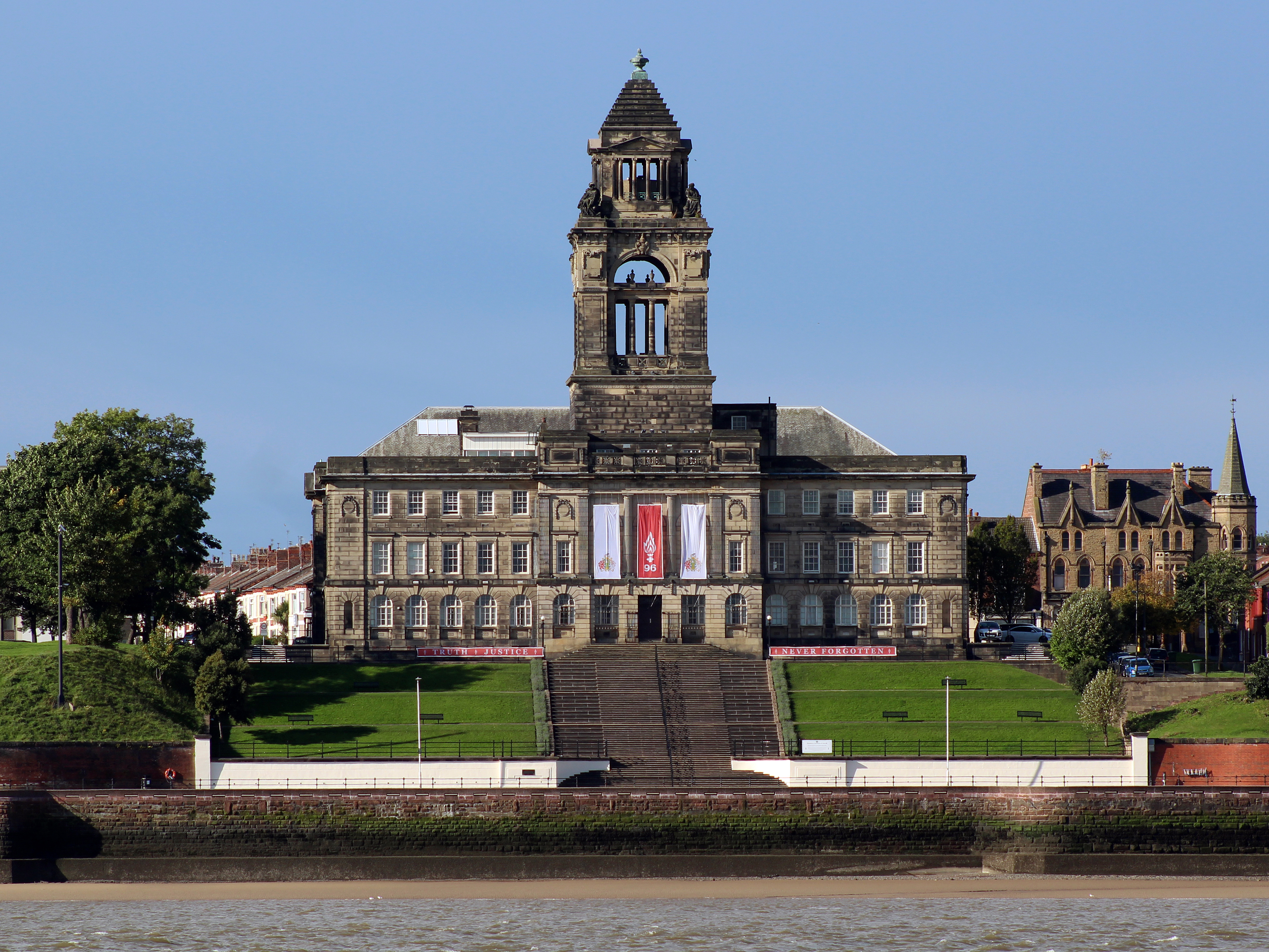
- Wallasey Town Hall, Brighton Street, Wallasey, CH44 8ED

Website
- wirral.gov.uk

Wirral Council, or Wirral Metropolitan Borough Council, is the local authority of the Metropolitan Borough of Wirral in Merseyside, England. It is a metropolitan district council with borough status, thus providing the majority of local government services in the borough. The council has been a member of the Liverpool City Region Combined Authority since 2014.

The council has been under no overall control since 2019, with the leader of the council belonging to the Labour Party. Council meetings are held at Wallasey Town Hall and the main administrative offices are at Alice Ker Square in Birkenhead.

== History ==
The metropolitan district of Wirral and its council were created on 1 April 1974 under the Local Government Act 1972. It covered the area of five former districts, which were all abolished at the same time:

- Bebington Municipal Borough
- Birkenhead County Borough
- Hoylake Urban District
- Wallasey County Borough
- Wirral Urban District (Covered an area on the west side of the peninsula, with its council based in Heswall.)

The two county boroughs, Birkenhead and Wallasey, had provided all local government services in their areas. The other three districts had been lower-tier authorities with Cheshire County Council providing county-level services. The area was transferred from Cheshire to become of the five districts in the new metropolitan county of Merseyside. The first election to the new council was held in 1973. For its first year the council acted as a shadow authority alongside the area's outgoing authorities. The new metropolitan district and its council formally came into being on 1 April 1974, at which point the old districts and their councils were abolished.

The new Wirral district was awarded borough status from its creation, allowing the chair of the council to take the title of mayor. The council styles itself Wirral Council rather than its full formal name of Wirral Metropolitan Borough Council.

From 1974 until 1986 the council was a lower-tier authority, with upper-tier functions provided by Merseyside County Council. The county council was abolished in 1986 and its functions passed to Merseyside's five borough councils, including Wirral, with some services provided through joint committees.

Since 2014 the council has been a member of the Liverpool City Region Combined Authority, which has been led by the directly elected Mayor of the Liverpool City Region (sometimes termed the "Metro Mayor") since 2017. The combined authority provides strategic leadership and co-ordination for certain functions across the region, but Wirral Council continues to be responsible for most local government functions.

== Political control ==
The council has been under no overall control since 2019, being led by a Labour minority administration.

Political control of the council since 1974 has been as follows:

Party in Control	Years
No overall control	1974–1975
Conservative	1975–1986
No overall control	1986–1991
Labour	1991–1992
No overall control	1992–1995
Labour	1995–2002
No overall control	2002–2012
Labour	2012–2019
No overall control	2019–present

=== Leadership ===
The role of Mayor of Wirral (also termed the "Civic Mayor" to distinguish it from the Metro Mayor) is largely ceremonial. They represent the borough at civic functions, support local charities and chair full council meetings. They are expected to be politically impartial whilst they hold the post, although they do get an additional casting vote in the event of a tie.

Political leadership is instead provided by the leader of the council. The leaders since 1974 have been:

Councillor	Image	Party	From	To
Malcolm Thornton		Conservative	1974	May 1977
Harry Deverill		Conservative	May 1977	May 1980
David Fletcher		Conservative	May 1980	May 1985
John Hale		Conservative	May 1985	Oct 1986
		No overall control	1986	1990
Yvonne Nolan		Labour	1990	May 1991
George Clark		Labour	1991	1992
		No overall control	1992	1995
Dave Jackson		Labour	May 1995	23 Apr 2000
Steve Foulkes		Labour	May 2000	24 May 2010
Jeff Green		Conservative	24 May 2010	23 May 2011
Steve Foulkes		Labour	23 May 2011	13 Feb 2012
Jeff Green		Conservative	13 Feb 2012	21 May 2012
Phil Davies		Labour	21 May 2012	May 2019
Pat Hackett		Labour	14 May 2019	Sep 2020
Janette Williamson		Labour	28 Sep 2020	May 2023
Paul Stuart		Labour	24 May 2023	May 2025
Paula Basnett		Labour	21 May 2025	

=== Composition ===
Following the 2023 election, and subsequent changes of allegiance up to June 2026, the composition of the council was:

Party	Councillors
Labour	26
Conservative	14
Green	14
Liberal Democrats	6
Reform	3
Independent	3
Total	66

The next election is due in 2027.

== Premises ==
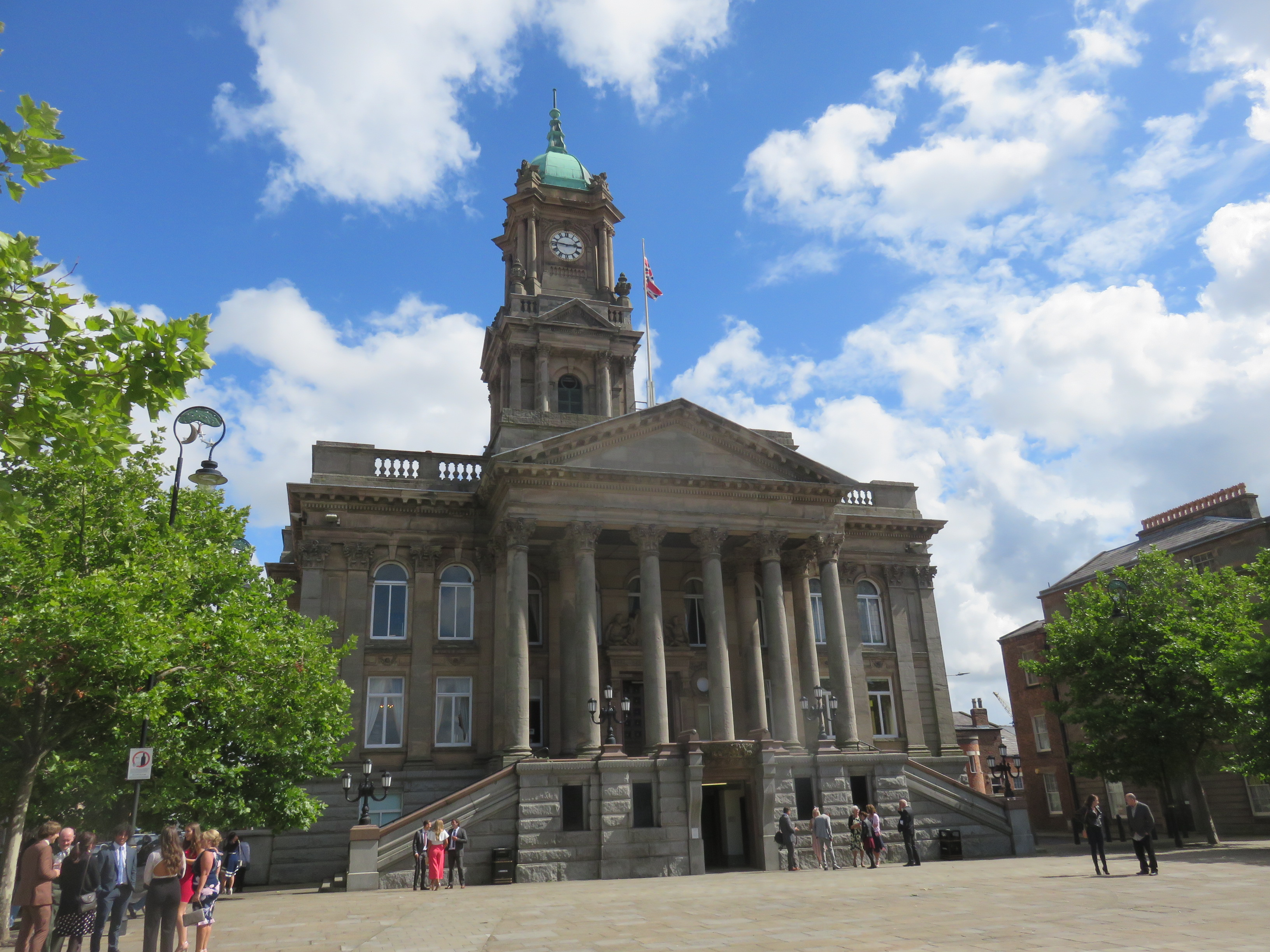
Birkenhead Town Hall, one of the council's buildings

Council meetings are held at Wallasey Town Hall, which was completed in 1916 for the former Wallasey Borough Council. The council's main offices are at Alice Ker Square in the centre of Birkenhead, being a modern office development completed in 2023. The council also owns Birkenhead Town Hall and has additional offices including the Cheshire Lines Committee building on Canning Street in Birkenhead.

== Elections ==
Since the last boundary changes in 2004, the council has comprised 66 councillors representing 22 wards, with each ward electing three councillors. The whole council is elected together every four years from 2023 onwards, having previously been elected a third of the council at a time.

=== Wards and councillors ===
Each ward is represented by three councillors.

Parliamentary constituency	Ward	Councillor	Party	Term of office	First elected (re-entered)
Birkenhead	Bidston and St James	Liz Grey	Labour	2023–27	2018
Birkenhead	Bidston and St James	Brian Kenny	Labour	2023–27	2006 (2015)
Birkenhead	Bidston and St James	Julie McManus	Labour	2023-27	2016
Birkenhead	Birkenhead and Tranmere	Pat Cleary	Green	2023–27	2014
Birkenhead	Birkenhead and Tranmere	Amanda Onwuemene	Green	2023-27	2022
Birkenhead	Birkenhead and Tranmere	Ewan Tomeny	Green	2023-27	2023
Birkenhead	Claughton	Gillian Wood	Labour	2023–27	2017
Birkenhead	Claughton	Steve Foulkes	Labour	2023–27	1990
Birkenhead	Claughton	George Davies	Labour	2023-27	1988
Birkenhead	Oxton	Allan Brame	Liberal Democrats	2023–27	2018
Birkenhead	Oxton	Mike Redfern	Liberal Democrats	2023-27	2006 (2023)
Birkenhead	Oxton	Stuart Kelly	Liberal Democrats	2023-27	1991 (1998, 2016)
Birkenhead	Prenton	Naomi Graham	Green	2023–27	2022
Birkenhead	Prenton	Chris Cooke	Green	2023–27	2019
Birkenhead	Prenton	Harry Gorman	Green	2023-27	2021
Birkenhead	Rock Ferry	Craig McDonald	Green	2023-27	2023
Birkenhead	Rock Ferry	Paula Basnett	Labour	2023-27	2023
Birkenhead	Rock Ferry	Tony Murphy	Labour	2023-27	2023
Wallasey	Leasowe and Moreton East	Angela Davies	Labour	2023-27	2015 (2022)
Wallasey	Leasowe and Moreton East	Paul Jobson	Labour	2023-27	2023
Wallasey	Leasowe and Moreton East	Louise Luxon-Kewley	Labour	2023-27	2023
Wallasey	Liscard	Janette Williamson	Labour	2023-27	2012
Wallasey	Liscard	Graeme Cooper	Labour	2024-27	2024
Wallasey	Liscard	James Laing	Labour	2023-27	2022
Wallasey	Moreton West and Saughall Massie	Vida Wilson	Conservative	2023-27	2022
Wallasey	Moreton West and Saughall Massie	Gary Bennett	Conservative	2023-27	2023
Wallasey	Moreton West and Saughall Massie	Colin Baldwin	Conservative	2023-27	2023
Wallasey	New Brighton	Sue Powell-Wilde	Labour	2023-27	2022
Wallasey	New Brighton	Paul Martin	Labour	2023-27	2021
Wallasey	New Brighton	Tony Jones	Labour	2023-27	2016
Wallasey	Seacombe	Tom Laing	Labour	2023-27	2023
Wallasey	Seacombe	Kaitlin Stuart	Labour	2023-27	2023
Wallasey	Seacombe	Paul Stuart	Labour	2023-27	2016
Wallasey	Wallasey	Lesley Rennie	Conservative	2023-27	1991 (1997)
Wallasey	Wallasey	Brenda Hall	Labour	2023-27	2023
Wallasey	Wallasey	Ian Lewis	Conservative	2023-27	1999 (2008, 2013, 2016)
Wirral South	Bebington	Judith Grier	Green	2023-27	2022
Wirral South	Bebington	Ed Lamb	Green	2023-27	2023
Wirral South	Bebington	Jason Walsh	Green	2023-27	2021
Wirral South	Bromborough	Ruth Molyneux	Green	2023-27	2023
Wirral South	Bromborough	Kieran Murphy	Green	2023-27	2023
Wirral South	Bromborough	Jo Bird	Green (Note: Expelled from the Labour Party in November 2021. Joined Green Party in March 2022.)	2023-27	2018
Wirral South	Clatterbridge	Mary Jordon	Conservative	2023-27	2018
Wirral South	Clatterbridge	Helen Cameron	Conservative	2023-27	2019
Wirral South	Clatterbridge	Cherry Povall JP	Conservative	2023-27	2008
Wirral South	Eastham	Chris Carubia	Liberal Democrats	2023-27	2014
Wirral South	Eastham	Helen Raymond	Liberal Democrats	2023-27	2023
Wirral South	Eastham	Phil Gilchrist	Liberal Democrats	2023-27	1977 (1992)
Wirral South	Heswall	Graham Davies	Reform UK	2023-27	2023
Wirral South	Heswall	Andrew Hodson	Reform UK	2023-27	1994
Wirral South	Heswall	Kathy Hodson	Reform UK	2023-27	2013
Wirral West	Greasby, Frankby and Irby	Gail Jenkinson	Green	2023-27	2023
Wirral West	Greasby, Frankby and Irby	Grahame McManus	Labour	2023-27	2023
Wirral West	Greasby, Frankby and Irby	Mark Skillicorn	Labour	2023-27	2023
Wirral West	Hoylake and Meols	Tony Cox	Conservative	2023-27	2011 (2018)
Wirral West	Hoylake and Meols	Max Booth	Conservative	2023-27	2021
Wirral West	Hoylake and Meols	Andrew Gardner	Conservative	2023-27	2018
Wirral West	Pensby and Thingwall	Ann Ainsworth	Labour	2023-27	2023
Wirral West	Pensby and Thingwall	Richie Pitt	Your Party	2023-27	2023
Wirral West	Pensby and Thingwall	Mike Sullivan	Labour	2023-27	2012 (2023)
Wirral West	Upton	Stephen Bennett	Labour	2023-27	2022
Wirral West	Upton	Jerry Williams	Labour	2023-27	1996 (2002, 2023)
Wirral West	Upton	Jean Robinson	Labour	2023-27	2018
Wirral West	West Kirby and Thurstaston	Jeff Green	Conservative	2023-27	1986
Wirral West	West Kirby and Thurstaston	Jenny Johnson	Conservative	2023-27	2019
Wirral West	West Kirby and Thurstaston	Simon Mountney	Conservative	2023-27	2004 (2021)
