= Phil Davies (politician) =

British Labour politician

Honorary Alderman Phil Davies
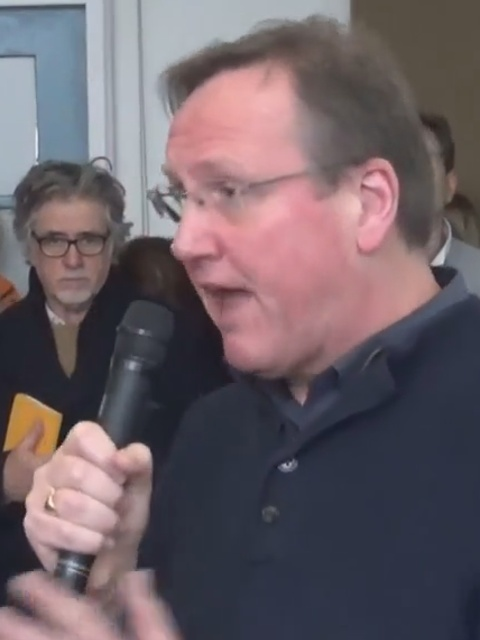
- Davies in 2017

Leader of Wirral Metropolitan Borough Council
- In office 14 May 2012 – 14 May 2019
- Deputy: George Davies
- Preceded by: Jeff Green
- Succeeded by: Pat Hackett

Labour Party Group Leader on Wirral Metropolitan Borough Council
- In office 29 March 2012 – 5 May 2019
- Deputy: Bernie Mooney
- Preceded by: Steve Foulkes
- Succeeded by: Pat Hackett

Wirral Metropolitan Borough Councillor for Birkenhead and Tranmere Birkenhead (1991–2004)
- In office 2 May 1991 – 2 May 2019
- Preceded by: Arthur Smith
- Succeeded by: Steve Hayes
- Majority: 1,367 (24.5%)

Personal details
- Born: Phillip Leslie Davies; 8 April 1959 (age 67)
- Party: Labour
- Education: Wirral Metropolitan College; University of Warwick; University of Strathclyde

Phillip Leslie Davies (born 8 April 1959), is a British Labour politician and former Leader of Wirral Council.

== Education ==
BA (Hons) Politics, University of Warwick, 1978–81; PhD in Public Policy, University of Strathclyde, 1981-85. Davies studied at Wirral Met College between 1975 and 1978.

== Political career ==
=== Councillor ===
Davies was first elected to Wirral Council in 1991 for the then Labour safe seat of Birkenhead. In 2004, he was re-elected to the Birkenhead and Tranmere ward after boundary changes.

=== Labour group leader ===
In March 2012, Davies was deputy leader of the Labour group when then leader Steve Foulkes, who lost a vote of confidence as leader of the council in February, stood down citing the "constant stress" of the role. Davies was subsequently elected in his place and was leader of the opposition until Labour took control of the council that May.

On 16 October 2018 he said he was to stand down as both Leader of the Council and councillor for Birkenhead and Tranmere at the next local elections in May 2019. His seat was gained by Steve Hayes of the Green Party on a majority of 1,140 over the Labour candidate.

On 24 June he was made an Honorary Alderman of Wirral Council.

=== Wirral West parliamentary candidate ===
Davies was selected as the Labour candidate for the Wirral West Constituency at the 2010 General Election after the incumbent MP, Stephen Hesford, stood down for family reasons. Davies lost to future Secretary of State for Work and Pensions, Esther McVey, by a margin of 2,436.

=== Merseyside Deputy Police and Crime Commissioner nomination ===
Davies is currently the only candidate to be selected as deputy to Jane Kennedy, Police and Crime Commissioner for Merseyside. Kennedy, whose previous deputy Emily Spurrell stood down after Kennedy left the Labour Party, was due to stand down at the May 2020 election but had her term extended due to the delay of said election warranting a new deputy. However, after being offered the position, Phil Davies decided to decline the appointment on the grounds that it would require too high a level of commitment, and that he preferred to continue enjoying his retirement.

== Electoral history ==
Wirral Metropolitan Borough Council election, 7 May 2015: Birkenhead and Tranmere
Party	Candidate	Votes	%	±%
Labour	Phillip Davies	3,130	56.0	▲15.2
Green	Jayne Clough	1,763	31.6	▼16.1
UKIP	Laurence Sharpe-Stevens	447	8.0	▼1.6
Conservative	June Cowin	183	3.3	▲1.3
Liberal Democrats	Mary Price	61	1.1	New
Majority		1,367	24.5	N/A
Registered electors		9,854		
Turnout			56.9	▲21.5
Labour hold		Swing	▲15.6	

Wirral Metropolitan Borough Council election, 5 May 2011: Birkenhead and Tranmere
Party	Candidate	Votes	%	±%
Labour	Phillip Davies	1,750	53.9	▲2.1
Green	Pat Cleary	1,133	34.9	▲11.3
Conservative	June Cowin	148	4.6	▼3.6
UKIP	David Martin	120	3.7	▼0.6
Liberal Democrats	Allan Brame	95	3.0	▼9.3
Majority		617	19.0	▼9.3
Registered electors		9,807		
Turnout			33.2	▼14.1
Labour hold		Swing	▼4.6	

General Election, 6 May 2010: Wirral West
Party	Candidate	Votes	%	±%
Conservative	Esther McVey	16,726	42.5	▲0.7
Labour	Phillip Davies	14,290	36.3	▼4.0
Liberal Democrats	Peter Reisdorf	6,630	16.8	▲0.5
UKIP	Philip Griffiths	899	2.3	▲1.1
Ind. Conservative	David Kirwan	506	1.3	▲1.3
Common Sense Party	David James	321	0.8	▲0.8
Majority		2,436	6.2	N/A
Turnout		39,372	71.5	▲3.4
Conservative gain from Labour		Swing	▲2.4	

Wirral Metropolitan Borough Council election, 3 May 2007: Birkenhead and Tranmere
Party	Candidate	Votes	%	±%
Labour	Phillip Davies	1,399	62.4	▲9.2
Liberal Democrats	Alan Brighouse	333	14.9	▲0.5
Conservative	June Cowin	255	11.4	▲2.2
Green	Catherine Page	254	11.3	▲3.2
Majority		1,066	47.5	▲9.4
Registered electors		10,374		
Turnout			21.7	▲0.8
Labour hold		Swing	▲4.7	

Wirral Metropolitan Borough Council election, 10 June 2004: Birkenhead and Tranmere
Party	Candidate	Votes	%	±%
Labour	Jean Stapleton	1,400	47.7	N/A
Labour	Phillip Davies	1,292	–	–
Labour	David Christian	1,275	–	–
WIN	Andrew Dow	408	13.9	N/A
Liberal Democrats	Phillip Lloyd	401	13.7	N/A
WIN	Deirdre Baker	382	–	–
Liberal Democrats	Alan Brighouse	376	–	–
Liberal Democrats	Margaret Teggin	349	–	–
WIN	John Maher	311	–	–
Green	Catherine Page	249	8.5	N/A
BNP	John Edwards	246	8.4	N/A
Conservative	Tom Parker	233	7.9	N/A
Conservative	Kenneth Jackson	217	–	–
Conservative	Elizabeth Johnson	186	–	–
Majority		992	33.8	N/A
Registered electors		10,364		
Turnout			27.0	N/A
Labour win (new seat)				
Labour win (new seat)				
Labour win (new seat)				

Wirral Metropolitan Borough Council election, 1 May 2003: Birkenhead
Party	Candidate	Votes	%	±%
Labour	Phillip Davies	1,157	70.3	▼10.1
Liberal Democrats	Philip Lloyd	188	11.4	▼1.3
Conservative	David Noble	118	7.2	▲0.4
WIN	John Maher	98	6.0	New
Socialist Alliance Against The War	Morag Reid	45	2.7	New
Green	Christopher Childe	40	2.4	New
Majority		969	58.9	▼8.8
Registered electors		9,867		
Turnout			16.7	▼1.8
Labour hold		Swing	▼4.4	

Wirral Metropolitan Borough Council election, 6 May 1999: Birkenhead
Party	Candidate	Votes	%	±%
Labour	Phillip Davies	1,298	74.1	▼5.0
Liberal Democrats	Mary Williams	166	9.5	▼11.4
Conservative	Susan Bebell	132	7.5	New
Socialist Labour	Alec McFadden	94	5.4	New
Green	Stuart Harvey	62	3.5	New
Majority		1,132	64.6	▲6.4
Registered electors		9,887		
Turnout			17.7	▲0.4
Labour hold		Swing	▲3.2	

Wirral Metropolitan Borough Council election, 4 May 1995: Birkenhead
Party	Candidate	Votes	%	±%
Labour	Phillip Davies	2,850	88.3	▲3.9
Liberal Democrats	P. Cooke	196	6.1	▼2.1
Conservative	B. Brassey	183	5.7	▼1.6
Majority		2,654	82.2	▲6.0
Registered electors		10,508		
Turnout			30.7	▼4.2
Labour hold		Swing	▲3.0	

Wirral Metropolitan Borough Council election, 2 May 1991: Birkenhead
Party	Candidate	Votes	%	±%
Labour	Phillip Davies	2,610	71.0	▼10.8
Conservative	J. Oliver	490	13.3	▲5.3
Liberal Democrats	Stephen Niblock	404	11.0	▲4.5
Green	Pamela Mitchell	174	4.7	▲1.0
Majority		2,120	57.7	▼16.1
Registered electors		10,912		
Turnout			33.7	▼9.7
Labour hold		Swing	▼8.1	

Political offices
Preceded by Arthur Smith	Councillor for Birkenhead; 1992–2004	Succeeded by Ward abolished
Preceded by Ward Created	Councillor for Birkenhead and Tranmere; 2004–2019	Succeeded by Steve Hayes
Preceded by Jeff Green	Leader of Wirral Council; 2012–2019	Succeeded by Pat Hackett
Party political offices
Preceded by Steve Foulkes	Leader of Wirral Council Labour Group; 2012–2019	Succeeded by Pat Hackett
