= Jeff Green (British politician) =

British politician (born 1957)

Cllr Jeff Green
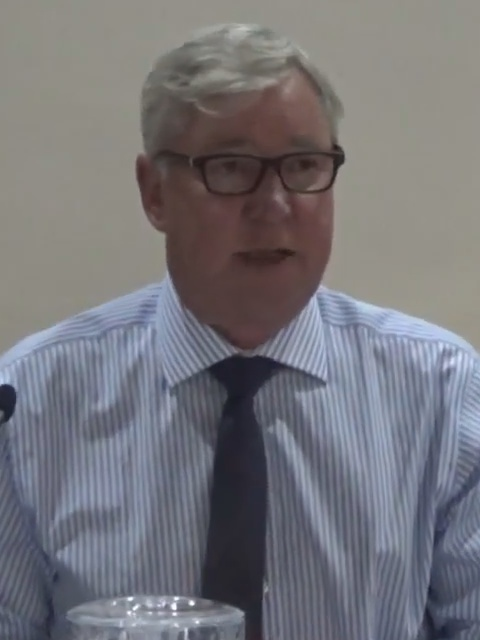
- Green in 2018

Conservative Party Group Leader on Wirral Metropolitan Borough Council
- In office 22 December 2020 – 14 May 2021
- Deputy: Leslie Rennie
- Preceded by: Ian Lewis
- Succeeded by: Tom Anderson
- In office 2002 – 8 May 2017
- Deputy: Leslie Rennie
- Preceded by: John Hale
- Succeeded by: Ian Lewis

Wirral Metropolitan Borough Councillor for West Kirby and Thurstaston Thurstaston (1986–2004)
- Incumbent
- Assumed office 8 May 1986
- Preceded by: Don McCubbin
- Majority: 1,680 (36.3%)

Leader of Wirral Metropolitan Borough Council
- In office 13 February 2012 – 14 May 2012
- Deputy: Simon Holbrook
- Preceded by: Steve Foulkes
- Succeeded by: Phil Davies
- In office 24 May 2010 – 16 May 2011
- Deputy: Simon Holbrook
- Preceded by: Steve Foulkes
- Succeeded by: Steve Foulkes

Personal details
- Born: Jeffrey Edwin Green; 5 May 1957 (age 69)
- Party: Conservative
- Children: 2

Jeffrey Edwin Green (born 5 May 1957) is a British Conservative politician and former leader of Wirral Council between 2010 and 2011 and in 2012. He was the first Conservative to hold the role in 24 years.

== Political career ==
=== Councillor ===
Green was first elected to Wirral Council in 1986 in the Tory safe seat of Thurstaston. After boundary change in 2004, Thurstaston was abolished and Green was re-elected to the new West Kirby and Thurstaston ward.

=== Conservative Leader ===
In 2002, he succeeded John Hale as leader of the Conservative group, a role he held until 2017 when he lost a leadership challenge to Wallasey councillor Ian Lewis. He became Leader of the Conservative Group again in December 2020 when Lewis stepped down, beating David Burgess Joyce a secret ballot. He did not stand for re-election for the role in May 2021, instead he was nominated for the role of Deputy Mayor.

=== Leader of Wirral Council ===
Green was first elected leader on 24 May 2010 after forming an alliance with the Liberal Democrats branded a "Coalition of Losers." by outgoing Labour leader Steve Foulkes. Green's reign lasted less than a year before the Lib Dems withdrew their support citing that, after the 2011 election, "they were not given a mandate to continue running the council as part of a coalition." and Foulkes resumed office.

After a Vote of no confidence in Steve Foulkes' leadership on 13 February 2012, Green once again became council leader continuing until the Labour Party took control of the council at the 2012 election. He was succeeded by Phil Davies.

Anna Klonowski report

During his first stint as Leader, Green commissioned a report into claims of whistleblower Martin Morton, a former social services employee, who was bullied out of his job after revealing systematic financial abuse of vulnerable people in council care. The report discovered that a "corrosive culture" existed within the authority in which the "abnormal has become commonplace."

Attempted smear campaign

In 2016, a £17,000 inquiry revealed that ex-Labour council leader Steve Foulkes had broken the council code of conduct and brought the council into disrepute over a leaked telephone conversation he had had with four whistleblowers. Foulkes denied ever using the recording to "smear" Green.

== Personal life ==
Green lives in Irby with his wife Carol, a local headteacher. The couple have two daughters.

Political offices
Preceded by Steve Foulkes	Leader of Wirral Council; 2010–2011	Succeeded by Steve Foulkes
Preceded by Steve Foulkes	Leader of Wirral Council; 2012 (Feb – May)	Succeeded by Phil Davies
Party political offices
Preceded by John Hale	Leader of Wirral Council Conservative Group; 2002–2017	Succeeded by Ian Lewis
Preceded by Ian Lewis	Leader of Wirral Council Conservative Group; 2020–present	Incumbent
