= 1992 Wirral Metropolitan Borough Council election =

1992 election of Wirral Council members

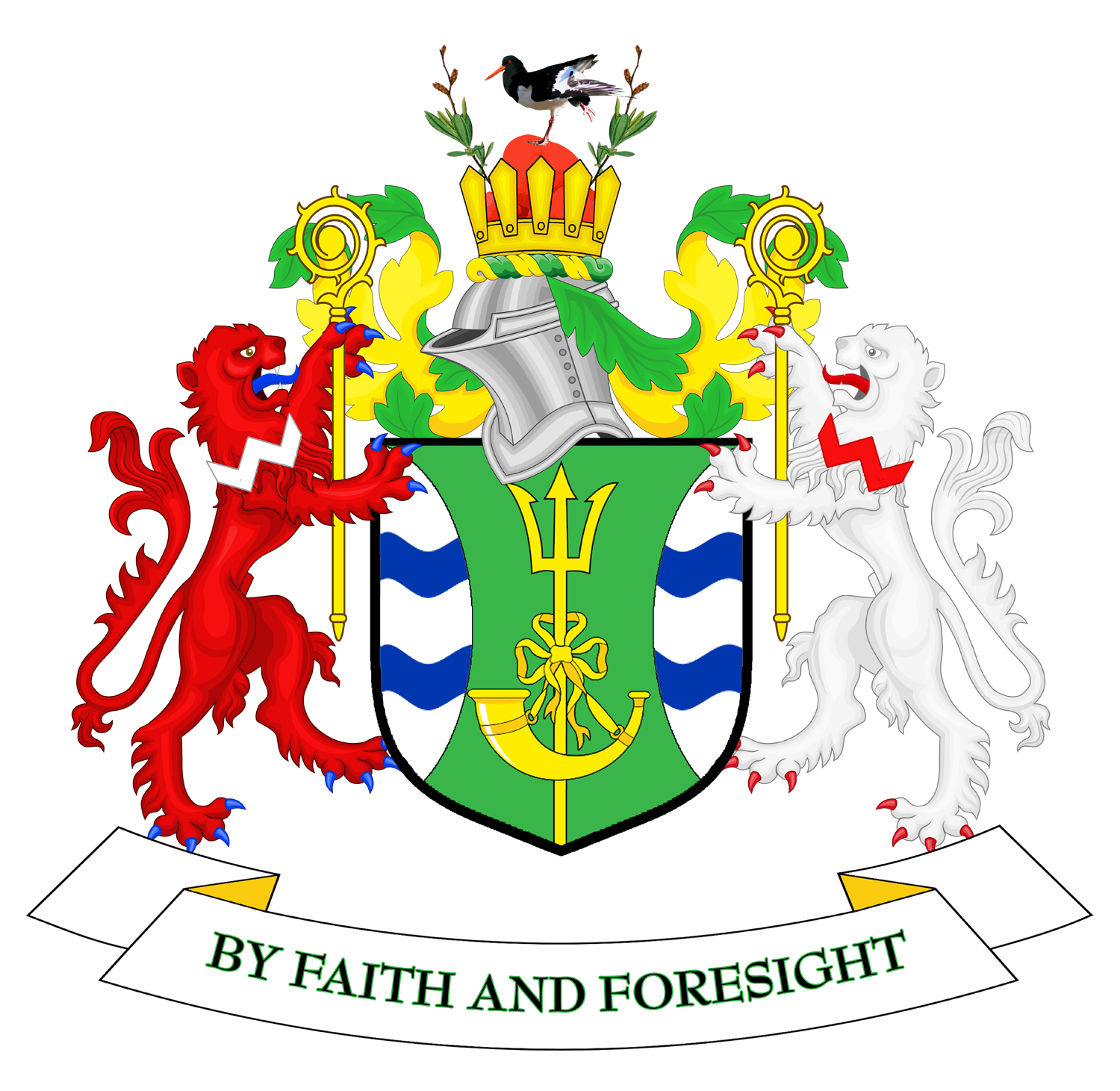
- 7 May 1992

22 of 66 seats (One Third) to Wirral Metropolitan Borough Council 34 seats needed for a majority
- Turnout: 39.6% (▼9.2%)
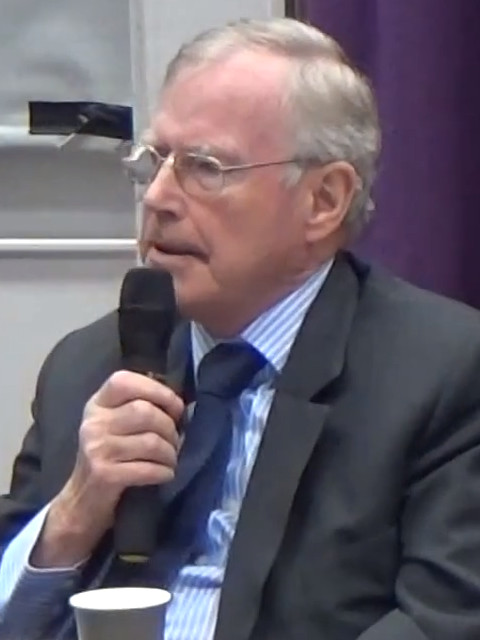
	First party	Second party	Third party
		Lab	LD
Leader	John Hale	George Clark	Gordon Lindsay
Party	Conservative	Labour	Liberal Democrats
Leader's seat	Hoylake	Moreton (lost)	Oxton
Last election	11 seats, 43.6%	9 seats, 31.5%	3 seats, 19.3%
Seats before	24	34	7
Seats won	12	8	2
Seats after	29	31	6
Seat change	▲5	▼3	▼1
Popular vote	50,918	30,161	17,152
Percentage	50.5%	29.9%	17.0%
Swing	▲6.9%	▼1.6%	▼2.3%
- Map of results of 1992 election
Leader of the Council before election
George Clark
Labour
Leader of the Council after election
None
No Overall Control

The 1992 Wirral Metropolitan Borough Council election took place on 7 May 1992 to elect members of Wirral Metropolitan Borough Council in England. This election was held on the same day as other local elections.

After the election, the composition of the council was:

Party	Seats	±
Labour	31	▼3
Conservative	29	▲5
Liberal Democrats	6	▼1
Independent Labour	0	▼1

== Election results ==
=== Overall election result ===
Overall result compared with 1991.

Wirral Metropolitan Borough Council election results, 1992
Party	Candidates						Votes		
Party	Stood	Elected	Gained	Unseated	Net	% of total	%	No.	Net %
Conservative	21	12	5	0	▲5	54.5	50.5	50,918	▲6.9
Labour	22	8	2	5	▼3	36.4	29.9	30,161	▼1.6
Liberal Democrats	22	2	1	2	▼1	9.1	17.0	17,152	▼2.3
Green	22	0	0	0	Steady	0.0	2.5	2,502	▼1.5
Independent Labour	1	0	0	1	▼1	0.0	0.2	156	▼1.5

== Ward results ==
=== Bebington ===
Bebington
Party	Candidate	Votes	%	±%
Conservative	Brian Cummings	2,935	62.4	▲6.3
Labour	Audrey Moore	1,250	26.6	▼1.8
Liberal Democrats	Kevin Turner	390	8.3	▼3.4
Green	T. Keen	132	2.8	▼1.0
Majority		1,685	35.8	▲8.1
Registered electors		11,061		
Turnout			42.6	▼11.1
Conservative hold		Swing	▲4.1	

=== Bidston ===
Bidston
Party	Candidate	Votes	%	±%
Labour	J. Williams	1,536	76.8	▲1.6
Liberal Democrats	A. Molyneux	355	17.8	▲8.7
Green	D. Pye	109	5.5	▲1.4
Majority		1,181	59.1	▼4.5
Registered electors		8,698		
Turnout			23.0	▼12.7
Labour hold		Swing	▼2.3	

=== Birkenhead ===
Birkenhead
Party	Candidate	Votes	%	±%
Labour	D. Gower	1,998	73.0	▲2.0
Conservative	J. Oliver	447	16.3	▲3.0
Liberal Democrats	P. Cooke	213	7.8	▼3.2
Green	Catherine Page	80	2.9	▼1.8
Majority		1,551	56.6	▼1.0
Registered electors		10,754		
Turnout			25.5	▼8.2
Labour hold		Swing	▼0.5	

=== Bromborough ===
Bromborough
Party	Candidate	Votes	%	±%
Labour	David Jackson	1,723	44.0	▲1.0
Conservative	J. Faulkner	1,670	43.0	▲8.5
Liberal Democrats	L. Smith	406	10.5	▼7.1
Green	Cecil Bowler	85	2.2	▼2.3
Majority		53	1.4	▼7.5
Registered electors		11,328		
Turnout			34.3	▼11.7
Labour hold		Swing	▼3.8	

=== Clatterbridge ===
Clatterbridge
Party	Candidate	Votes	%	±%
Conservative	Michael Moore	4,245	70.0	▲9.3
Labour	P. Mason	977	16.1	▼1.9
Liberal Democrats	A. Byde	717	11.8	▼6.2
Green	S. Keen	123	2.0	▼1.4
Majority		3,268	53.9	▲11.2
Registered electors		14,180		
Turnout			42.8	▼7.5
Conservative hold		Swing	▲5.6	

=== Claughton ===
Claughton
Party	Candidate	Votes	%	±%
Labour	George Davies	1,909	38.8	▲7.7
Liberal Democrats	B. Grocott	1,851	37.6	▼5.2
Conservative	D. Smith	1,058	21.5	▼1.9
Green	A. Cuthbertson	99	2.0	▼0.7
Majority		58	1.2	N/A
Registered electors		10,753		
Turnout			45.7	▼5.5
Labour hold		Swing	▲6.5	

=== Eastham ===
Eastham
Party	Candidate	Votes	%	±%
Liberal Democrats	Phillip Gilchrist	3,362	58.3	▲14.8
Conservative	A. Drury	1,240	21.5	▼2.7
Labour	P. Jones	1,091	18.9	▼11.3
Green	Nigel Birchenough	69	1.2	▼0.9
Majority		2,122	36.8	▲23.5
Registered electors		11,961		
Turnout			48.2	▼6.3
Liberal Democrats gain from Labour		Swing	▲11.8	

=== Egerton ===
Egerton
Party	Candidate	Votes	%	±%
Labour	Andrew Dow (Note: Incumbent councillor for Eastham ward.)	1,677	48.6	▼3.1
Conservative	J. Thomas	1,117	32.4	▲9.9
Liberal Democrats	Freda Anderson	564	16.3	▼5.7
Green	Tina Fox	94	2.7	▼1.2
Majority		560	16.2	▼13.0
Registered electors		11,142		
Turnout			31.0	▼10.7
Labour gain from Liberal Democrats		Swing	▼6.5	

=== Heswall ===
Heswall
Party	Candidate	Votes	%	±%
Conservative	T. Price	4,317	77.3	▲5.3
Liberal Democrats	W. Jones	636	11.4	▲3.0
Labour	M. Sambrook	496	8.9	▼1.3
Green	Barbara Burton	134	2.4	▼1.0
Majority		3,681	65.9	▲8.3
Registered electors		13,317		
Turnout			41.9	▼8.8
Conservative hold		Swing	▲4.2	

=== Hoylake ===
Hoylake
Party	Candidate	Votes	%	±%
Conservative	Frank Jones	4,307	78.5	▲5.6
Labour	D. Clee	551	10.0	▼0.1
Liberal Democrats	J. Dennis	456	8.3	▼3.6
Green	Allen Burton	175	3.2	▼1.8
Majority		3,756	68.4	▲7.4
Registered electors		12,707		
Turnout			43.2	▼9.0
Conservative hold		Swing	▲3.8	

=== Leasowe ===
Leasowe
Party	Candidate	Votes	%	±%
Labour	Aileen Keyes	1,610	54.7	▲15.1
Conservative	E. Pritchard	1,069	36.3	▲15.3
Liberal Democrats	B. Thomas	185	6.3	▼1.0
Green	S. Hughes	78	2.7	▲0.1
Majority		541	18.4	▲8.3
Registered electors		9,894		
Turnout			29.7	▼16.0
Labour gain from Independent Labour		Swing	▲4.2	

=== Liscard ===
Liscard
Party	Candidate	Votes	%	±%
Conservative	M. Ebbs	2,288	47.5	▲7.9
Labour	E. Smith	1,991	41.3	▼3.9
Liberal Democrats	M. Skelly	405	8.4	▼2.4
Green	W. Lorimer	137	2.8	▼1.6
Majority		297	6.2	N/A
Registered electors		11,525		
Turnout			41.8	▼10.5
Conservative gain from Labour		Swing	▲5.9	

=== Moreton ===
Moreton
Party	Candidate	Votes	%	±%
Conservative	Vic Borg	2,412	56.8	▲8.0
Labour	John Clark	1,447	34.1	▲7.0
Liberal Democrats	C. Robertson	168	4.0	▼3.8
Labour Moderate	Jim Edwards (Note: Incumbent councillor for Leasowe ward.)	156	3.7	▼10.0
Green	Pamela Mitchell	66	1.6	▼0.9
Majority		965	22.7	▲1.0
Registered electors		9,495		
Turnout			44.7	▼14.3
Conservative gain from Labour		Swing	▲0.5	

=== New Brighton ===
New Brighton
Party	Candidate	Votes	%	±%
Conservative	T. McMahon	2,590	53.2	▲3.5
Labour	Adrian Jones	1,589	32.6	Steady
Liberal Democrats	John Codling	466	9.6	▼2.2
Green	Sally Davis	225	4.6	▼1.3
Majority		1,001	20.6	▲3.5
Registered electors		11,683		
Turnout			41.7	▼7.4
Conservative gain from Labour		Swing	▲1.8	

=== Oxton ===
Oxton
Party	Candidate	Votes	%	±%
Liberal Democrats	Alec Dunn (Note: Incumbent councillor for Egerton ward.)	2,008	41.6	▼5.8
Conservative	Mark Hughes	1,961	40.6	▲8.6
Labour	David Christian	763	15.8	▼0.7
Green	K. Cuthbertson	98	2.0	▼2.1
Majority		47	1.0	▼14.4
Registered electors		11,818		
Turnout			40.9	▼9.1
Liberal Democrats hold		Swing	▼7.2	

=== Prenton ===
Prenton
Party	Candidate	Votes	%	±%
Conservative	Howard Morton	2,577	41.2	▲2.0
Liberal Democrats	John Thornton	2,532	40.5	▲2.6
Labour	John Mitchell	1,083	17.3	▼3.4
Green	Perle Shedricks	63	1.0	▼1.1
Majority		45	0.7	▼0.6
Registered electors		12,083		
Turnout			51.8	▼4.6
Conservative gain from Liberal Democrats		Swing	▼0.3	

=== Royden ===
Royden
Party	Candidate	Votes	%	±%
Conservative	Derek Robinson	4,030	74.8	▲8.1
Labour	G. O'Neill	672	12.5	▼0.4
Liberal Democrats	B. Crosbie	518	9.6	▼4.3
Green	Garnette Bowler	166	3.1	▼3.5
Majority		3,358	62.3	▲9.5
Registered electors		12,766		
Turnout			42.2	▼9.1
Conservative hold		Swing	▲4.8	

=== Seacombe ===
Seacombe
Party	Candidate	Votes	%	±%
Labour	P. Clee	2,575	65.7	▲3.3
Conservative	L. May	1,039	26.5	▲4.1
Liberal Democrats	D. Kelly	222	5.7	▼4.8
Green	L. Georgeson	82	2.1	▼2.5
Majority		1,536	39.2	▼0.8
Registered electors		11,604		
Turnout			33.8	▼10.0
Labour hold		Swing	▼0.4	

=== Thurstaston ===
Thurstaston
Party	Candidate	Votes	%	±%
Conservative	Sid Dunn	3,883	75.0	▲8.5
Labour	W. Gamet	685	13.2	▼1.9
Liberal Democrats	Charles Wall	418	8.1	▼5.1
Green	David Burton	194	3.7	▼1.4
Majority		3,198	61.7	▲10.3
Registered electors		12,691		
Turnout			40.8	▼9.1
Conservative hold		Swing	▲5.2	

=== Tranmere ===
Tranmere
Party	Candidate	Votes	%	±%
Labour	R. Davies	1,527	65.3	▲0.8
Conservative	D. Brunskill	488	20.9	▲2.4
Liberal Democrats	Stephen Blaylock	235	10.0	▼2.6
Green	Angela Upton	90	3.8	▼0.6
Majority		1,039	44.4	▼1.5
Registered electors		10,045		
Turnout			23.3	▼13.1
Labour hold		Swing	▼0.8	

=== Upton ===
Upton
Party	Candidate	Votes	%	±%
Conservative	L. Turnbull	3,205	55.8	▲16.1
Labour	W. Lowe	2,045	35.6	▼5.2
Liberal Democrats	E. Davies	403	7.0	▼8.6
Green	L. Bulton	89	1.5	▼2.5
Majority		1,160	20.2	N/A
Registered electors		12,897		
Turnout			44.5	▼4.7
Conservative gain from Labour		Swing	▲10.7	

=== Wallasey ===
Wallasey
Party	Candidate	Votes	%	±%
Conservative	Kate Wood	4,040	70.1	▲9.6
Labour	J. Strang	966	16.8	▼2.0
Liberal Democrats	John Uriel	642	11.1	▼6.1
Green	Robert Mitchell	114	2.0	▼1.5
Majority		3,074	53.3	▲11.7
Registered electors		12,212		
Turnout			47.2	▼7.8
Conservative hold		Swing	▲5.8	

== Changes between 1992 and 1994 ==
Date	Ward	Name	Previous affiliation	New affiliation	Circumstance
March 1994	Eastham	Vera Ruck	Labour	Conservative	Defected.

== Notes ==
• italics denote the sitting councillor • bold denotes the winning candidate
