= 1977 Merseyside County Council election =

1977 UK local government election

- 5 May 1977

All 99 seats to Merseyside County Council 50 seats needed for a majority
- Turnout: 35.6% (▼1.1%)
	First party	Second party	Third party
	Blank	Blank	Blank
Party	Conservative	Labour	Liberal
Last election	26 seats, 33.7%	53 seats, 41.3%	19 seats, 21.8%
Seats before	26	53	19
Seats won	67	26	6
Seat change	▲41	▼27	▼13
Popular vote	224,376	111,733	66,579
Percentage	55.1%	27.4%	16.3%
Swing	▲21.4%	▼13.9%	▼5.5%
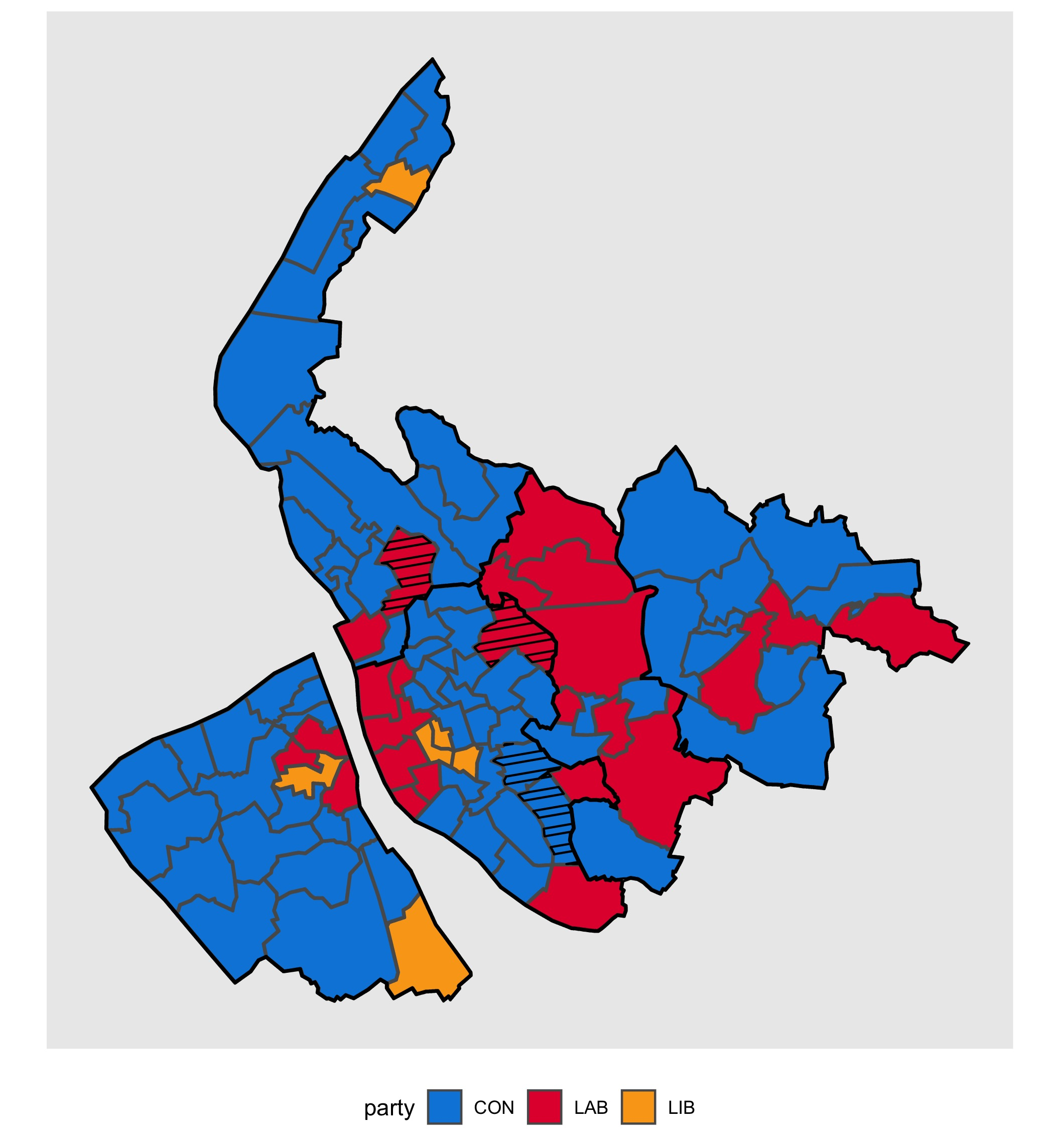
- Map of Merseyside County Council showing wards won by party
Control of Council before election
Labour
Control of Council after election
Conservative

The 1977 Merseyside County Council election took place on 5 May 1977 to elect members of Merseyside County Council in England. This was on the same day as other local elections.

The Conservative Party gained overall control of the council from Labour.

== Election results ==
=== Overall election result ===
Overall result compared with 1973.

Merseyside County Council election, 1977
Party	Candidates						Votes		
Party	Stood	Elected	Gained	Unseated	Net	% of total	%	No.	Net %
Conservative	99	67	41	0	▲41	67.7	55.1	224,376	▲21.4
Labour	93	26	0	27	▼27	26.3	27.4	111,733	▼13.9
Liberal	78	6	1	14	▼13	6.1	16.3	66,579	▼5.5
Communist	19	0	0	0	0	0.0	0.6	2,425	▼0.1
Ind. Conservative	1	0	0	0	0	0.0	0.2	765	▲0.1
Independent	1	0	0	0	0	0.0	0.1	465	▼0.1
National Party	3	0	0	0	0	0.0	0.1	392	New
National Front	3	0	0	0	0	0.0	0.1	228	New
Labour/Liberal	1	0	0	0	0	0.0	0.0	86	New
Independent Liberal	1	0	0	0	0	0.0	0.0	83	N/A
Anti-corruption League	1	0	0	0	0	0.0	0.0	60	New
Liberal Union	1	0	0	0	0	0.0	0.0	59	New
Independent Labour	1	0	0	0	0	0.0	0.0	45	N/A
Residents	0	0	0	1	▼1	0.0	0.0	0	▼1.9

=== Results by borough ===
==== Knowsley borough ====
Merseyside County Council election, 1977 (Knowsley)
Party	Candidates						Votes		
Party	Stood	Elected	Gained	Unseated	Net	% of total	%	No.	Net %
Conservative	11	4	3	0	▲3	36.4	48.5	18,095	▲23.3
Labour	11	7	0	3	▼3	63.6	44.8	16,747	▼16.5
Liberal	3	0	0	0	0	0.0	3.4	1,272	▼8.1
Ind. Conservative	1	0	0	0	0	0.0	2.0	765	N/A
Communist	3	0	0	0	0	0.0	1.1	422	▼0.9
Independent Labour	1	0	0	0	0	0.0	0.1	45	N/A

Turnout: 29.8% (▼1.7%)

==== Liverpool borough ====
Merseyside County Council election, 1977 (Liverpool)
Party	Candidates						Votes		
Party	Stood	Elected	Gained	Unseated	Net	% of total	%	No.	Net %
Conservative	36	23	19	0	▲19	63.9	47.0	64,528	▲17.9
Labour	36	10	0	8	▼8	27.8	28.2	38,754	▼11.8
Liberal	34	3	0	11	▼11	8.3	23.5	32,314	▼5.9
Communist	9	0	0	0	0	0.0	0.9	1,247	▲0.5
National Party	1	0	0	0	0	0.0	0.1	162	New
National Front	2	0	0	0	0	0.0	0.1	95	New
Labour/Liberal	1	0	0	0	0	0.0	0.1	86	New
Independent Liberal	1	0	0	0	0	0.0	0.1	83	N/A
Liberal Union	1	0	0	0	0	0.0	0.0	59	New

Turnout: 33.9% (▼0.5%)

==== Sefton borough ====
Merseyside County Council election, 1977 (Sefton)
Party	Candidates						Votes		
Party	Stood	Elected	Gained	Unseated	Net	% of total	%	No.	Net %
Conservative	19	15	4	0	▲4	78.9	63.7	47,794	▲20.9
Labour	15	3	0	3	▼3	15.8	20.2	15,160	▼10.5
Liberal	13	1	0	0	0	5.3	14.7	11,002	▼0.8
Communist	4	0	0	0	0	0.0	0.7	512	▼0.4
Independent	1	0	0	0	0	0.0	0.6	465	▼0.3
Anti-corruption League	1	0	0	0	0	0.0	0.1	60	New
Residents	0	0	0	1	▼1	0.0	0.0	0	▼9.0

Turnout: 34.0% (▼6.0%)

==== St Helens borough ====
Merseyside County Council election, 1977 (St Helens)
Party	Candidates						Votes		
Party	Stood	Elected	Gained	Unseated	Net	% of total	%	No.	Net %
Conservative	11	8	6	0	▲6	72.7	58.0	29,725	▲30.1
Labour	11	3	0	6	▼6	27.3	36.4	18,665	▼19.7
Liberal	6	0	0	0	0	0.0	5.6	2,850	▼9.4

Turnout: 37.3% (▲2.9)

==== Wirral borough ====
Merseyside County Council election, 1977 (Wirral)
Party	Candidates						Votes		
Party	Stood	Elected	Gained	Unseated	Net	% of total	%	No.	Net %
Conservative	22	17	9	0	▲9	77.3	60.4	64,234	▲21.8
Labour	20	3	0	7	▼7	13.6	21.1	22,407	▼16.5
Liberal	22	2	1	3	▼2	9.1	18.0	19,141	▼5.0
Communist	3	0	0	0	0	0.0	0.2	244	0.0
National Party	2	0	0	0	0	0.0	0.2	230	New
National Front	1	0	0	0	0	0.0	0.1	133	New

Turnout: 41.8% (▲0.7)

== Ward results ==
Results compared directly with the last local election in 1973.

=== Knowsley ===
==== Huyton With Roby No. 1 (Huyton Farm-Princess-Woolfall) ====
Huyton Farm-Princess-Woolfall
Party	Candidate	Votes	%	±%
Labour	P. Longfall	1,126	59.6	▼23.4
Conservative	A. Gray	762	40.4	▲26.7
Majority		364	19.2	▼50.1
Registered electors		9,236		
Turnout			20.5	▼5.8
Labour hold		Swing	▼25.1	

==== Huyton With Roby No. 2 (Longview and Rupert Farm) ====
Longview and Rupert Farm
Party	Candidate	Votes	%	±%
Conservative	J. Easthope	1,562	54.8	▲32.5
Labour	C. Frederick	1,288	45.2	▼6.7
Majority		274	9.6	N/A
Registered electors		9,067		
Turnout			31.5	▼5.7
Conservative gain from Labour		Swing	▲18.9	

==== Huyton With Roby No. 3 (St Agnes-St Bartholomews-Swanside) ====
St Agnes-St Bartholomews-Swanside
Party	Candidate	Votes	%	±%
Conservative	W. Simpson	4,056	77.0	▲32.1
Labour	S. Wells	1,209	23.0	▼10.8
Majority		2,847	54.0	▲42.9
Registered electors		13,192		
Turnout			40.0	▼4.7
Conservative hold		Swing	▲21.5	

==== Huyton With Roby No. 4 (St Gabriels and St Michaels) ====
St Gabriels and St Michaels
Party	Candidate	Votes	%	±%
Labour	S. Powell	1,718	53.2	▼11.9
Conservative	C. White	1,514	46.8	▲24.4
Majority		204	6.4	▼36.3
Registered electors		11,192		
Turnout			28.9	▼4.9
Labour hold		Swing	▼18.2	

==== Kirkby No. 1 (Central and Minstead) ====
Central and Minstead
Party	Candidate	Votes	%	±%
Labour	J. King	1,450	56.1	▼10.6
Conservative	G. Fogarty	627	24.3	New
Liberal	R. Jones	349	13.5	▼15.0
Communist	J. Myers	112	4.3	▼0.6
Independent Labour	T. Ryan	45	1.7	New
Majority		823	31.8	▼6.4
Registered electors		10,246		
Turnout			25.3	▲0.6
Labour hold		Swing	▼3.2	

==== Kirkby No. 2 (Cherryfield and Whitfield) ====
Cherryfield and Whitfield
Party	Candidate	Votes	%	±%
Labour	J. Gallagher	1,431	45.2	▼8.1
Conservative	J. Smith	1,088	34.8	▲30.7
Liberal	W. McFadden	510	16.3	▼22.4
Communist	W. Jones	116	3.7	▼0.2
Majority		325	10.4	▼4.2
Registered electors		11,187		
Turnout			28.1	▲5.2
Labour hold		Swing	▼2.1	

==== Kirkby No. 3 (Northwood-Park-Tower Hill-Simonswood) ====
Northwood-Park-Tower Hill-Simonswood
Party	Candidate	Votes	%	±%
Labour	G. Bundred	1,983	52.5	▼20.1
Conservative	C. Baily	1,187	31.4	▲12.4
Liberal	J. Smith	413	10.9	New
Communist	T. Bradburn	194	5.1	▼3.4
Majority		796	21.1	▼32.5
Registered electors		15,378		
Turnout		3,777	24.6	▲3.9
Labour hold		Swing	▼16.3	

==== Prescot ====
Prescot
Party	Candidate	Votes	%	±%
Conservative	W. Hughes	1,888	57.7	▲18.9
Labour	W. Howarth	1,386	42.3	▼18.9
Majority		502	15.4	N/A
Registered electors		8,654		
Turnout			37.9	▼4.8
Conservative gain from Labour		Swing	▲18.9	

==== Whiston No. 1 (Croton-Tarbock-Whiston) ====
Croton-Tarbock-Whiston
Party	Candidate	Votes	%	±%
Labour	R. Foulkes	1,444	40.1	▼25.5
Conservative	S. Pyne	1,390	38.6	▲4.2
Ind. Conservative	B. Jeffrey	765	21.3	New
Majority		54	1.5	▼29.7
Registered electors		11,132		
Turnout			32.6	▼2.2
Labour hold		Swing	▼14.9	

==== Whiston No. 3 (Halewood) ====
Halewood
Party	Candidate	Votes	%	±%
Conservative	J. Sinclair	2,488	54.3	▲26.7
Labour	J. Bohanna	2,094	45.7	▼26.7
Majority		394	8.6	▼36.2
Registered electors		14,426		
Turnout			31.8	▼2.5
Conservative gain from Labour		Swing	▲26.7	

==== Whiston No. 4 (Knowsley) ====
Knowsley
Party	Candidate	Votes	%	±%
Labour	W. Alldritt	1,618	51.3	▼19.5
Conservative	T. Maudsley	1,533	48.7	▲29.4
Majority		85	2.6	▼48.9
Registered electors		11,914		
Turnout			26.5	▼1.2
Labour hold		Swing	▼24.5	

=== Liverpool ===
==== Liverpool No. 1 (Abercromby and St James) ====
Abercromby and St James
Party	Candidate	Votes	%	±%
Labour	H. Carr	1,401	57.4	▼21.7
Conservative	D. Lewis	555	22.8	▲11.0
Communist	R. O'Hara	253	10.4	▲1.3
Liberal	P. Bradley	144	5.9	New
Labour/Liberal	J. Murphy	86	3.5	New
Majority		846	34.6	▼32.7
Registered electors		12,892		
Turnout			19.0	▼3.8
Labour hold		Swing	▼16.4	

==== Liverpool No. 2 (Aigburth) ====
Aigburth
Party	Candidate	Votes	%	±%
Conservative	S. Moss	5,159	73.7	▼5.1
Liberal	P. Message	1,116	15.9	New
Labour	J. Hughes	727	10.4	▼10.8
Majority		4,043	57.8	▲0.2
Registered electors		14,729		
Turnout		7,002	47.7	▲11.7
Conservative hold		Swing	▲0.1	

==== Liverpool No. 3 (Allerton) ====
Allerton
Party	Candidate	Votes	%	±%
Conservative	W. Weaver	3,365	73.0	▲17.8
Liberal	T. Harte	651	14.1	▼14.0
Labour	T. McManus	592	12.8	▼3.9
Majority		2,714	58.9	▲31.8
Registered electors		10,683		
Turnout			43.2	▲4.4
Conservative hold		Swing	▲15.9	

==== Liverpool No. 4 (Anfield) ====
Anfield
Party	Candidate	Votes	%	±%
Conservative	T. Pink	2,316	49.3	▲21.4
Labour	F. McGurk	1,497	31.8	▼6.9
Liberal	J. Wilmington	889	18.9	▼14.5
Majority		819	17.5	N/A
Registered electors		12,682		
Turnout			37.1	▼2.5
Conservative gain from Labour		Swing	▲11.4	

==== Liverpool No. 5 (Arundel) ====
Arundel
Party	Candidate	Votes	%	±%
Conservative	H. Quayle	1,872	42.7	▲21.1
Liberal	G. Scattergood	1,457	33.2	▼25.1
Labour	F. Roderick	885	20.2	▲0.1
Communist	J. Kay	171	3.9	New
Majority		415	9.5	▼27.2
Registered electors		13,612		
Turnout			32.3	▼1.2
Conservative gain from Liberal		Swing	▲23.1	

==== Liverpool No. 6 (Breckfield and St Domingo) ====
Breckfield and St Domingo
Party	Candidate	Votes	%	±%
Conservative	J. Butterfield	1,346	40.6	▲22.1
Labour	G. Pratt	1,023	30.8	▼4.9
Liberal	F. Nevin	950	28.6	▼17.2
Majority		323	9.8	N/A
Registered electors		12,035		
Turnout			27.6	▼2.0
Conservative gain from Liberal		Swing	▲10.0	

==== Liverpool No. 7 (Broadgreen) ====
Broadgreen
Party	Candidate	Votes	%	±%
Labour	B. Wright	2,170	45.3	▲24.9
Liberal	R. Cooper	1,864	38.9	▼23.0
Conservative	C. Winter	753	15.7	▼2.0
Majority		306	6.4	N/A
Registered electors		12,124		
Turnout			39.5	▼2.2
Labour gain from Liberal		Swing	▲24.0	

==== Liverpool No. 8 (Central Everton and Netherfield) ====
Central Everton and Netherfield
Party	Candidate	Votes	%	±%
Labour	J. Parry	1,518	61.6	▼14.3
Conservative	W. Gerrard	663	26.9	▲12.2
National Party	M. Holme	162	6.6	New
Liberal	J. Kelly	120	4.9	New
Majority		855	34.7	▼26.5
Registered electors		11,676		
Turnout			21.2	▼1.9
Labour hold		Swing	▼13.3	

==== Liverpool No. 9 (Childwall) ====
Childwall (2)
Party	Candidate	Votes	%	±%
Conservative	C. Henry De Boer	5,490	68.7	▲33.0
Conservative	M. Wood	5,202	–	–
Liberal	P. Hodgson	1,333	16.7	▼35.0
Liberal	F. Ricketts	1,190	–	–
Labour	F. Dunne	1,163	14.6	▲2.0
Labour	J. Roberts	1,123	–	–
Majority		4,157	52.0	N/A
Registered electors		20,372		
Turnout			39.4	▼4.0
Conservative gain from Liberal		Swing	▲34.0	
Conservative gain from Liberal		Swing	–	

==== Liverpool No. 10 (Church) ====
Church
Party	Candidate	Votes	%	±%
Conservative	H. Bolton-Jones	3,607	51.2	▲20.3
Liberal	J. Bradley	2,900	41.1	▼21.9
Labour	T. Roberts	543	7.7	▲1.6
Majority		707	10.1	N/A
Registered electors		15,016		
Turnout			47.1	▲1.4
Conservative gain from Liberal		Swing	▲21.1	

==== Liverpool No. 11 (Clubmoor) ====
Clubmoor
Party	Candidate	Votes	%	±%
Conservative	S. Hicklin	1,512	38.8	▲16.3
Liberal	J. Bowen	1,353	34.8	▼7.1
Labour	P. Rowlands	1,028	26.4	▼9.2
Majority		159	4.0	N/A
Registered electors		10,382		
Turnout			37.6	▼8.1
Conservative gain from Liberal		Swing	▲5.2	

==== Liverpool No. 12 (County) ====
County
Party	Candidate	Votes	%	±%
Conservative	W. Thomas	1,686	39.5	▼1.4
Liberal	P. Clark	1,360	31.9	New
Labour	J. McLean	1,223	28.6	▼30.5
Majority		326	7.6	N/A
Registered electors		11,938		
Turnout			35.8	▲3.4
Conservative gain from Labour		Swing	▲12.9	

==== Liverpool No. 13 (Croxteth) ====
Croxteth
Party	Candidate	Votes	%	±%
Conservative	E. Fitzpatrick	3,200	54.3	▲28.6
Liberal	G. Holmes	1,923	32.6	▼27.6
Labour	J. Hudson	773	13.1	▼0.9
Majority		1,277	21.7	N/A
Registered electors		12,244		
Turnout			48.2	▼1.6
Conservative gain from Liberal		Swing	▲28.1	

==== Liverpool No. 14 (Dingle) ====
Dingle
Party	Candidate	Votes	%	±%
Labour	M. Evans	980	54.1	▼10.0
Conservative	J. Watson	591	32.7	▲15.2
Liberal	K. Osborne	163	9.0	▼5.9
Communist	J. Greig	76	4.2	▲0.7
Majority		389	21.5	▼25.1
Registered electors		7,295		
Turnout			24.9	▼5.5
Labour hold		Swing	▼12.6	

==== Liverpool No. 15 (Dovecot) ====
Dovecot
Party	Candidate	Votes	%	±%
Conservative	J. Walsh	2,141	46.0	▲14.2
Labour	W. Burke	1,919	41.3	▼26.9
Liberal	Rosemary Cooper	591	12.7	New
Majority		222	4.7	N/A
Registered electors		16,140		
Turnout			28.9	▼2.2
Conservative gain from Labour		Swing	▲20.6	

==== Liverpool No. 16 (Fairfield) ====
Fairfield
Party	Candidate	Votes	%	±%
Conservative	J. Davis	1,219	38.2	▲16.5
Liberal	I. Bale	1,091	34.2	▼7.7
Labour	S. Gorman	831	26.1	▼10.2
National Front	M. Dover	49	1.5	New
Majority		128	4.0	N/A
Registered electors		10,274		
Turnout			31.1	▼4.0
Conservative gain from Liberal		Swing	▼4.0	

==== Liverpool No. 17 (Fazakerley) ====
Fazakerley
Party	Candidate	Votes	%	±%
Conservative	A. Brown	1,938	43.5	▲0.5
Labour	A. Williams	1,305	29.3	▼27.7
Liberal	N. Cardwell	1,215	27.3	New
Majority		633	14.2	N/A
Registered electors		11,497		
Turnout			38.9	▲4.7
Conservative gain from Labour		Swing	▲14.1	

==== Liverpool No. 18 (Gillmoss) ====
Gillmoss (2)
Party	Candidate	Votes	%	±%
Labour	Edward Loyden	2,457	59.7	▼18.7
Labour	K. Stewart	2,144	–	–
Conservative	P. Dougherty	1,658	40.3	▲18.7
Conservative	P. Ferris	1,637	–	–
Majority		799	19.4	▼37.4
Registered electors		19,140		
Turnout			23.4	▼0.6
Labour hold		Swing	▼18.7	
Labour hold		Swing	–	

==== Liverpool No. 19 (Granby and Princes Park) ====
Granby and Princes Park
Party	Candidate	Votes	%	±%
Labour	Margaret Simey	1,545	47.2	▼21.0
Conservative	T. Staniford	1,179	36.0	▲9.3
Liberal	A. Damsell	376	11.5	New
Communist	M. McClelland	175	5.3	▲0.1
Majority		366	11.2	▼30.3
Registered electors		13,467		
Turnout			23.4	▼1.9
Labour hold		Swing	▼15.2	

==== Liverpool No. 20 (Kensington) ====
Kensington
Party	Candidate	Votes	%	±%
Liberal	F. Doran	1,340	58.2	▼0.6
Labour	J. Stamper	510	22.1	▼9.8
Conservative	H. Davies	450	19.7	▲10.4
Majority		830	36.0	▲9.2
Registered electors		6,525		
Turnout			35.4	▼4.7
Liberal hold		Swing	▲4.6	

==== Liverpool No. 21 (Low Hill and Smithdown) ====
Low Hill and Smithdown
Party	Candidate	Votes	%	±%
Liberal	N. Caple	1,507	53.9	▼15.8
Labour	J. Devaney	892	31.9	▲5.8
Conservative	D. Jones	350	12.5	▲8.3
National Front	S. Hamilton	46	1.6	New
Majority		615	22.0	▼21.6
Registered electors		8,453		
Turnout			33.1	▼0.4
Liberal hold		Swing	▼10.8	

==== Liverpool No. 22 (Melrose and Westminster) ====
Melrose and Westminster
Party	Candidate	Votes	%	±%
Labour	B. Shaw	1,184	59.4	▼13.4
Conservative	W. Gilbody	632	31.7	▲4.5
Liberal	R. McNally	177	8.9	New
Majority		552	27.7	▼17.9
Registered electors		7,755		
Turnout			25.8	▼3.0
Labour hold		Swing	▼9.0	

==== Liverpool No. 23 (Old Swan) ====
Old Swan
Party	Candidate	Votes	%	±%
Conservative	W. Bradshaw	2,044	41.4	▲24.3
Liberal	D. Jones	1,780	36.1	▼19.8
Labour	D. Krumbein	904	18.3	▼7.4
Communist	H. Mohin	124	2.5	New
Independent Liberal	W. McCullough	83	1.7	▲0.4
Majority		264	5.3	N/A
Registered electors		12,771		
Turnout			38.7	▼4.8
Conservative gain from Liberal		Swing	▲17.8	

==== Picton ====
Picton
Party	Candidate	Votes	%	±%
Liberal	P. Mahon *	1,973	43%	
Conservative	W. McGuirk	1,285	28%	
Labour	Robert Wareing	1,223	27%	
Communist	J. G. Volleamere	78	2%	
Majority		688		
Registered electors		12,225		
Turnout		4,559	37.3%	
Liberal hold		Swing		

==== Pirrie ====
Pirrie
Party	Candidate	Votes	%	±%
Conservative	I. Brown	2,393	47%	
Labour	H. Dalton	2,302	45%	
Liberal	D. P. J. Turner	413	8%	
Majority		91		
Registered electors		16,059		
Turnout		5,108	32%	
Conservative gain from		Swing		

==== St. Mary's ====
St. Mary's
Party	Candidate	Votes	%	±%
Conservative	F. S. Hughes	1,403	46%	
Labour	G. J. Maudsley	1,191	39%	
Liberal	C. J. Lister	354	12%	
Communist	R. Ross	94	3%	
Liberal Union	S. J. Naden	59	2%	
Majority		212		
Registered electors		10,105		
Turnout		3,042	30%	
Conservative gain from		Swing		

==== St. Michael's ====
St. Michael's
Party	Candidate	Votes	%	±%
Conservative	R. S. Jones	1,647	46%	
Liberal	Richard Kemp	1,316	37%	
Labour	D. Ralston	634	18%	
Majority		331		
Registered electors		10,693		
Turnout		3,597	34%	
Conservative gain from		Swing		

==== Sandhills and Vauxhall ====
Sandhills and Vauxhall
Party	Candidate	Votes	%	±%
Labour	W. H. Sefton *	1,453	80%	
Conservative	K. B. Jacques	238	13%	
Liberal	R. J. Cunningham	128	7%	
Majority		1,215	67%	
Registered electors		10,501		
Turnout		1,819	17%	
Labour hold		Swing		

==== Speke ====
Speke
Party	Candidate	Votes	%	±%
Labour	Kenneth Stewart *	1,756	56%	
Conservative	C. W. Harpin	1,164	37%	
Liberal	A. C. Pistotnick-Howard	232	7%	
Majority		592	19%	
Registered electors		14,808		
Turnout		3,152	21%	
Labour hold		Swing		

==== Tuebrook ====
Tuebrook
Party	Candidate	Votes	%	±%
Conservative	D. P. Dougherty	1,852	46%	
Liberal	R. Gore	1,209	30%	
Labour	B. Simpson	912	23%	
Communist	P. B. Bissette	65	2%	
Majority		643		
Registered electors		11,678		
Turnout		4,038	35%	
Conservative gain from		Swing		

==== Warbreck ====
Warbreck
Party	Candidate	Votes	%	±%
Conservative	R. B. Flude	2,089	49%	
Liberal	I. C. Todd	1,238	29%	
Labour	J. Finnegan	898	21%	
Majority		851		
Registered electors		12,195		
Turnout		4,225	35%	
Conservative gain from		Swing		

==== Woolton East ====
Woolton East
Party	Candidate	Votes	%	±%
Labour	L. Evans	1,786	49%	
Conservative	J. H. Kirkham	1,373	38%	
Liberal	Miss G. Loughney	252	7%	
Communist	J. Humes	211	6%	
Majority		413	11%	
Registered electors		13,002		
Turnout		3,622	28%	
Labour hold		Swing		

==== Woolton West ====
Woolton West (2)
Party	Candidate	Votes	%	±%
Conservative	T. L. Hobday *	5,982	76%	
Conservative	L. B. Williams *	5,937	76%	
Labour	J. M. Lyon	946	12%	
Liberal	Miss A. Smallman	899	11%	
Labour	P. Owens	874	11%	
Liberal	J. B. Kaltiff	835	11%	
Majority		5,036		
Registered electors		17,820		
Turnout		8,827	44%	
Conservative hold		Swing		
Conservative hold		Swing		

=== Sefton ===
==== Bootle No.1 (Derby & Stanley) ====
Bootle No.1 (Derby & Stanley)
Party	Candidate	Votes	%	±%
Conservative	F. P. Morris	1,607	48%	▲21.3
Labour	Hugh Baird *	1,450	43%	▼17
Liberal	R. E. Williams	243	7%	
Communist	T. Egan	74	2%	▼1
Majority		157	5%	▼18.3
Registered electors				
Turnout		3,374		
Conservative gain from Labour		Swing		

==== Bootle No. 2 (Linacre and Mersey) ====
Bootle No. 2 (Linacre and Mersey)
Party	Candidate	Votes	%	±%
Labour	W. A. Wiseman	1,121	59%	
Independent	G. Evason	465	24%	
Conservative	T. I. Percy	235	12%	
Communist	C. P. Curry	94	5%	
Majority		886		
Registered electors		11,509		
Turnout		1,915	17%	
Labour gain from		Swing		

==== Bootle No. 3 (Netherton-Orrell-Sefton) ====
Bootle No. 3 (Netherton-Orrell-Sefton) (2)
Party	Candidate	Votes	%	±%
Labour	B. Hillen *	3,217	50%	
Labour	J. Riley	3,126	48%	
Conservative	G. Halliwell	2,981	46%	
Conservative	G. Lockley	2,698	42%	
Communist	R. Morris	263	4%	
Majority		236		
Registered electors		24,169		
Turnout		6,461	27%	
Labour hold		Swing		
Labour hold		Swing		

==== Crosby No. 1 (Central-College-St. John's) ====
Crosby No. 1 (Central-College-St. John's)
Party	Candidate	Votes	%	±%
Conservative	N. C. Goldrein	3,090	69%	
Labour	J. E. Ohren	788	17%	
Liberal	G. A. Flaxman	627	17%	
Majority		2,302	52%	
Registered electors		12,423		
Turnout		4,505	36%	
Conservative hold		Swing		

==== Crosby No. 2 (Christ Church-St. Mary's-St. Thomas) ====
Crosby No. 2 (Christ Church-St. Mary's-St. Thomas No. 2)
Party	Candidate	Votes	%	±%
Conservative	R. O. Harvey	1,995	56%	
Labour	J. M. Murphy	1,356	38%	
Liberal	J. Sartain	208	6%	
Majority		639		
Registered electors		10,731		
Turnout		3,559	33%	
Conservative gain from		Swing		

==== Crosby No. 3 (East and Little Crosby) ====
Crosby No. 3 (East and Little Crosby)
Party	Candidate	Votes	%	±%
Conservative	W. R. Bennett	2,585	72%	
Labour	D. F. Kerr	706	20%	
Liberal	O. Adshead	275	8%	
Majority		1,879		
Registered electors		9,676		
Turnout		3,566	37%	
Conservative gain from		Swing		

==== Crosby No. 4 (North and West) ====
Crosby No. 4 (North and West)
Party	Candidate	Votes	%	±%
Conservative	F. L. Pritchard	3,376	82%	
Liberal	S. M. Sime	454	11%	
Labour	G. Stringer	300	7%	
Majority		2,922		
Registered electors		9,076		
Turnout		4,130	46%	
Conservative gain from		Swing		

==== Formby ====
Formby
Party	Candidate	Votes	%	±%
Conservative	Sir K. P. Thompson	5,758	81%	
Liberal	M. J. Metcalf	1,376	19%	
Majority		4,382		
Registered electors		16,537		
Turnout		7,134	43%	
Conservative gain from		Swing		

==== Litherland ====
Litherland
Party	Candidate	Votes	%	±%
Conservative	Mrs. G. Buckles	2,653	48%	
Labour	O. F. Brady	2,445	44%	
Liberal	K. Holding	367	7%	
Communist	J. Hulligan	81	1.5%	
Majority		208		
Registered electors		16,515		
Turnout		5,546	34%	
Conservative gain from		Swing		

==== Southport No. 1 (Ainsdale-Birkdale South) ====
Southport No. 1 (Ainsdale-Birkdale South)
Party	Candidate	Votes	%	±%
Conservative	J. Hartley	3,774	87%	
Liberal	J. S. M. White	961	26%	
Labour	J. F. Caven	436	10%	
Majority		1,263	61%	
Registered electors		11,286		
Turnout		3,740	33%	
Conservative gain from		Swing		

==== Southport No. 2 (Birkdale East-Birkdale North-South) ====
Southport No. 2 (Birkdale East-Birkdale North-South)
Party	Candidate	Votes	%	±%
Conservative	C. Rawstron	2,224	59%	
Liberal	G. S. M. White	961	26%	
Labour	W. P. Lafferty	555	15%	
Majority		1,263		
Registered electors		11,286		
Turnout		3.740	33%	
Conservative gain from		Swing		

==== Southport No. 3 (Birkdale West-Central-West) ====
Southport No. 3 (Birkdale West-Central-West)
Party	Candidate	Votes	%	±%
Conservative	J. S. Mitchell	2,385	78%	
Liberal	E. E. Rothwell	654	22%	
Majority		1,731		
Registered electors		9,023		
Turnout		3,039	34%	
Conservative gain from		Swing		

==== Southport No. 4 (Craven-Sussex-Talbot) ====
Southport No. 4 (Craven-Sussex-Talbot)
Party	Candidate	Votes	%	±%
Liberal	Ronald Fearn *	2,438	50%	▲1.9
Conservative	B. Dawson	1,921	40%	▲12.7
Labour	G. A. Fenerty	476	10%	▼14.6
Majority		517		
Registered electors		11,406		
Turnout		4,835	42%	▼1.8
Liberal hold		Swing	▲1.9	

==== Southport No.5 (Hesketh & Scarisbrick) ====
Southport No.5 (Hesketh & Scarisbrick)
Party	Candidate	Votes	%	±%
Conservative	Mrs. J. Leech *	2,977	56%	
Liberal	P. J. Handley	1,848	35%	
Labour	J. J. Abram	474	9%	
Majority		1,129		
Registered electors		10,525		
Turnout		5,299	50%	
Conservative gain from		Swing		

==== Southport No.6 (Marine and Park) ====
Southport No.6 (Marine and Park)
Party	Candidate	Votes	%	±%
Conservative	W. Brown	2,712	67%	▲10
Liberal	P. F. Reilly	1,324	33%	▼10
Majority		1,388		
Registered electors		10,436		
Turnout		4,036	39%	
Conservative hold		Swing	▲10	

==== West Lancashire No. 1 (Aintree) ====
West Lancashire No. 1 (Aintree)
Party	Candidate	Votes	%	±%
Conservative	A. I. Birch *	3,282	83%	▲39.7
Labour	A. Riley	681	17%	▼5.9
Majority		2,601		
Registered electors		11,455		
Turnout		3,963	35%	
Conservative hold		Swing	▲39.7	

==== West Lancashire No. 2 (Maghull East and North-Melling) ====
West Lancashire No. 2 (Maghull East and North-Melling)
Party	Candidate	Votes	%	±%
Conservative	C. Currall *	3,839	76%	▲43.8
Labour	J. Howard	1,155	23%	▼7.8
Majority		2,694	53.6%	▲52.2
Registered electors		14,482		
Turnout		2,684	35%	▼10.4
Conservative hold		Swing	▲43.8	

==== West Lancashire No.3 (Maghull East and North-Melling) ====
West Lancashire No. 3 (Maghull East and North-Melling)
Party	Candidate	Votes	%	±%
Conservative	F. Dykins *	unopposed		
Registered electors		10,171		
Conservative hold		Swing		

=== St. Helens ===
==== Haydock ====
Haydock
Party	Candidate	Votes	%	±%
Conservative	P. Anderton	2,969	55%	
Labour	C. Davies	2,396	45%	
Majority		573		
Registered electors		11,022		
Turnout		5,365	49%	
Rejected ballots				
Conservative gain from		Swing		

==== Newton-Le-Willows ====
Newton-Le-Willows
Party	Candidate	Votes	%	±%
Labour	O. Conheeney	2,920	45%	
Conservative	Miss M. Monks	2,686	41%	
Liberal	R. Birch	910	14%	
Majority		234		
Registered electors		16,022		
Turnout		6,516	41%	
Labour gain from		Swing		

==== Rainford ====
Rainford
Party	Candidate	Votes	%	±%
Conservative	Mrs. A. Berry	5,270	78%	
Labour	R. Cliff	1,479	22%	
Majority		3,971		
Registered electors		14,053		
Turnout		6,749	48%	
Conservative gain from		Swing		

==== St. Helens No.1 (Central and South Eccleston) ====
St. Helens No.1 (Central and South Eccleston)
Party	Candidate	Votes	%	±%
Conservative	Mrs. E. Jameson	1,920	54%	▲17.8
Labour	L. Williams	1,380	39%	▼8.6
Liberal	W. Iley	260	7%	▼9.2
Majority		540	15.2%	▲3.8
Registered electors		10,259		
Turnout		3,560	35%	▼1.9
Conservative gain from Labour		Swing	▲26.4	

==== St. Helens No.2 (East Sutton) ====
St. Helens No.2 (East Sutton)
Party	Candidate	Votes	%	±%
Conservative	P. Harrison	1,632	47%	N/A
Labour	E. Maguire	1,496	43%	▼16.5
Liberal	J. Bentham	354	10%	▼30
Majority		136		
Registered electors		11,760		
Turnout		3,482	30%	
Conservative gain from		Swing		

==== St. Helens No. 3 (Hardshaw and West Sutton) ====
St. Helens No. 3 (Hardshaw and West Sutton)
Party	Candidate	Votes	%	±%
Labour	H. Glover	2,062	44%	▼21
Conservative	T. Webster	1,713	37%	N/A
Liberal	T. Gilligan	863	19%	▼16
Majority		349		
Registered electors		15,565		
Turnout		4,638	30%	
Labour hold		Swing	▼21	

==== St. Helens No. 4 (Moss Bank and North Windle) ====
St. Helens No. 4 (Moss Bank and North Windle)
Party	Candidate	Votes	%	±%
Conservative	E. Jameson	3,364	63%	▲15
Labour	N. Wilson	1,770	33%	▼19
Liberal	M. A. Kelly	227	4%	N/A
Majority		1,594		
Registered electors		13,452		
Turnout		5,361	40%	▲5.6
Conservative gain from Labour		Swing	▲34	

==== St. Helens No.5 (North Eccleston and South Windle) ====
St. Helens No.5 (North Eccleston and South Windle)
Party	Candidate	Votes	%	±%
Conservative	E. Clough	1,706	64%	▲23.6
Labour	J. Morris	953	36%	▼23.7
Majority		754		
Registered electors		8,471		
Turnout		2,659	31%	
Conservative gain from Labour		Swing	▲47.3	

==== St. Helens No.6 (Parr) ====
St. Helens No.6 (Parr)
Party	Candidate	Votes	%	±%
Labour	F. Mernagh *	2,272	55%	▼31.9
Conservative	C. Foster	1,625	39%	N/A
Liberal	I. Rigby	236	6%	N/A
Majority		647	15.7%	
Registered electors		16,313		
Turnout		4,133	25%	
Labour hold		Swing	▼31.9	

==== Whiston No. 2 (Eccleston and Windle) ====
Whiston No. 2 (Eccleston and Windle)
Party	Candidate	Votes	%	±%
Conservative	G. Brownlow *	3,954	88%	▲14.6
Labour	B. Hamilton	562	12%	▼14.6
Majority		3,392	75.1%	▲28.3
Registered electors		9,404		
Turnout		4,516	48%	▲7.1
Conservative hold		Swing	▲14.6	

==== Whiston No. 5 (Rainhill and Bold) ====
Whiston No. 5 (Rainhill and Bold)
Party	Candidate	Votes	%	±%
Conservative	Nellie Holley	2,866	68%	▲19.7
Labour	E. Norris	1,375	32%	▼20.3
Majority		1,491		
Registered electors		16,497		
Turnout		4,241	26%	▼13.8
Conservative gain from Labour		Swing	▲40	

=== Wirral ===
==== Bebington No. 1 (Higher Bebington and Woodhey) ====
Bebington No. 1 (Higher Bebington and Woodhey)
Party	Candidate	Votes	%	±%
Conservative	H. Harriman *	3,805	80%	▲30.2
Liberal	Jean Walker	970	20%	▲1.4
Majority		2,835		
Registered electors		10,279		
Turnout		4,775	46%	
Conservative gain from		Swing		

==== Bebington No. 2 (Sunlight, Park, New Ferry, North Bromborough) ====
Bebington No.2 (Sunlight, Park, New Ferry, North Bromborough)
Party	Candidate	Votes	%	±%
Conservative	E. A. Davies	2,138	51%	▲6.9
Labour	B. A. Bryning *	1,709	41%	▼24.9
Liberal	P. J. Taylor	314	8%	N/A
Majority		429		
Registered electors		9,776		
Turnout		4,161	43%	
Conservative gain from		Swing		

==== Bebington No. 3 (South Bromborough and Eastham) ====
Bebington No. 3 (South Bromborough and Eastham)
Party	Candidate	Votes	%	±%
Liberal	Phillip Gilchrist	2,816	45%	▲22.7
Conservative	L. Chrishop	2,256	36%	▲3.8
Labour	A. E. S. Rose	1,237	20%	▼24.6
Majority		560	8.88%	▼2.52
Registered electors		12,857		
Turnout		6,309	49%	▼4.4
Liberal gain from Labour		Swing	▲42.7	

==== Bebington No. 4 (Lower Bebington & Poulton) ====
Bebington No. 4 (Lower Bebington & Poulton)
Party	Candidate	Votes	%	±%
Conservative	F. J. K. Williams *	4,619	78%	▲30.3
Liberal	Thomas Harney	1,321	22%	▼4.4
Majority		3,298	55.5%	▲34.6
Registered electors		12,002		
Turnout		5,940	49%	▼5.9
Conservative hold		Swing	▲30.3	

==== Birkenhead No. 1 (Argyle-Clifton-Holt) ====
Birkenhead No. 1 (Argyle-Clifton-Holt)
Party	Candidate	Votes	%	±%
Labour	J. Stuart-Cole *	1,290	50%	▼20.6
Conservative	R. Entwistle	716	28%	▼1.4
Liberal	M. R. D. Gayford	403	16%	N/A
National Party	D. M. Matthews	117	5%	N/A
Communist (Young Communist League (Great Britain))	J. E. Norris	69	3%	N/A
Majority		574	22.1%	▲1.2
Registered electors		8,985		
Turnout		2,595	29%	▼26.9
Labour gain from		Swing	▼20.6	

==== Birkenhead No. 2 (Bebington and Mersey) ====
Birkenhead No. 2 (Bebington and Mersey)
Party	Candidate	Votes	%	±%
Conservative	H. Welsh	1,402	49%	▲12
Labour	C. S. McRonald	1,258	44%	▼19
Liberal	T. J. Edwards	190	7%	
Majority		144		
Registered electors		8,707		
Turnout		2,850	33%	
Conservative gain from Labour		Swing		

==== Birkenhead No. 3 (Cathcart-Claughton-Cleveland) ====
Birkenhead No. 3 (Cathcart-Claughton-Cleveland)
Party	Candidate	Votes	%	±%
Liberal	David Gruffydd Evans	1,826	55%	▲4.9
Conservative	George Porter	1,395	42%	▲21.1
Labour	Walter Smith	102	3%	▼26.2
Majority		431		
Registered electors		9,993		
Turnout		3,323	33%	▼17.4
Liberal gain from		Swing		

==== Birkenhead No.4 (Devonshire and Egerton) ====
Birkenhead No.4 (Devonshire and Egerton)
Party	Candidate	Votes	%	±%
Conservative	W. R. Baker	2,223	44%	▲18.8
Liberal	D. W. Hughes *	1,600	32%	▼18.1
Labour	G. Kenyon	1,202	24%	▼0.7
Majority		624	12.4%	▼17.8
Registered electors		12,461		
Turnout		5,025	40%	▼1.7
Conservative gain from Liberal		Swing		

==== Birkenhead No. 5 (Gilbrook and St James) ====
Birkenhead No. 5 (Gilbrook and St James)
Party	Candidate	Votes	%	±%
Labour	J. R. A. Flynn	1,702	58%	▼1.5
Conservative	R. A. Hodgkinson	629	22%	▲10.8
Liberal	E. Rose	593	20%	▼9.3
Majority		1,073	36.7%	▲6.5
Registered electors		9,030		
Turnout		2,924	32%	▼9.7
Labour hold		Swing	▼1.5	

==== Birkenhead No.6 Grange and Oxton) ====
Birkenhead No.6 Grange and Oxton)
Party	Candidate	Votes	%	±%
Conservative	F. J. Moreton	2,673	45%	▲16.2
Liberal	Gordon Lindsay *	2,295	39%	▼13.5
Labour	D. J. Healey	833	14%	▼4.4
National Party	W. R. Williams	113	2%	
Majority		378	6.4%	
Registered electors		12,348		
Turnout		5,914	48%	▲0.5
Conservative gain from Liberal		Swing		

==== Birkenhead No. 7 (Prenton) ====
Birkenhead No. 7 (Prenton)
Party	Candidate	Votes	%	±%
Conservative	A. E. Wise *	3,638	65%	▲11.6
Labour	W. R. Leslie	1,465	26%	▼20.6
Liberal	E. J. Banton	474	8%	N/A
Majority		2,173	39%	▲32.3
Registered electors		15,882		
Turnout		5,577	35%	▲5.4
Conservative hold		Swing		

==== Birkenhead No. 8 (Upton) ====
Birkenhead No. 8 (Upton)
Party	Candidate	Votes	%	±%
Conservative	Mrs. S. E. Hibbert	3,990	61%	▲18.8
Labour	E. C. Ainslie *	2,071	32%	▼19.1
Liberal	A. B. Halliday	470	7%	
Majority		1,919	29%	▲20.1
Registered electors		19,861		
Turnout		6,531	33%	▼3.3
Conservative gain from Labour		Swing		

==== Hoylake No.1 (Caldy and Frankby) ====
Hoylake No.1 (Caldy and Frankby)
Party	Candidate	Votes	%	±%
Conservative	H. H. H. Needham *	4,471	82%	N/A
Labour	J. Seaman	500	9%	N/A
Liberal	E. L. Fell	495	5%	N/A
Majority		3,971	72.6%	N/A
Registered electors		12,684		
Turnout		5,466	43%	N/A
Conservative hold		Swing	N/A	

==== Hoylake No.2 (Central-Hoose-Meols-Park) ====
Hoylake No.2 (Central-Hoose-Meols-Park)
Party	Candidate	Votes	%	±%
Conservative	J. W. Last *	4,570	78%	N/A
Liberal	I. Smith	897	15%	N/A
Labour	David Jackson	406	7%	N/A
Majority		3,673	62.5%	N/A
Registered electors		11,992		
Turnout		5,873	49%	N/A
Conservative hold		Swing	N/A	

==== Wallasey No.1 (Leasowe) ====
Wallasey No.1 (Leasowe)
Party	Candidate	Votes	%	±%
Conservative	K. R. Young	1,943	47%	▲21
Labour	Bill Wells	1,793	44%	▼15.6
Liberal	G. J. Canning	250	6%	▼8.4
National Front	John Fishwick	133	3%	N/A
Majority		150	3.6%	▼30
Registered electors		11,464		
Turnout		4,119	36%	▼0.7
Conservative gain from Labour		Swing		

==== Wallasey No.2 (Marlowe, Egremont South & Liscard) ====
Wallasey No.2 (Marlowe, Egremont South & Liscard)
Party	Candidate	Votes	%	±%
Conservative	B. J. Frisby	3,150	63%	▲23.1
Labour	A. R. Chowderoy	1,362	27%	▼13
Liberal	N. R. L. Thomas	523	10%	▼10.1
Majority		1,788	35.5%	▲35.4
Registered electors		12,629		
Turnout		5,072	40.16%	▲0.16
Rejected ballots		17	0.34%	
Conservative gain from Labour		Swing		

==== Wallasey No.3 (Moreton and Saughall Massie) ====
Wallasey No.3 (Moreton and Saughall Massie)
Party	Candidate	Votes	%	±%
Conservative	I. W. Allison	1,951	66%	▲31.1
Labour	C. Allman *	873	29%	▼20.6
Liberal	J. C. Jenkins	154	5%	▲10.5
Majority		1,078	36.2%	▲21.5
Registered electors		7,070		
Turnout		2,978	42%	▼2.4
Conservative gain from Labour		Swing		

==== Wallasey No.4 (New Brighton-Wallasey-Warren) ====
Wallasey No.4 (New Brighton-Wallasey-Warren)
Party	Candidate	Votes	%	±%
Conservative	M. F. Emberton	5,394	69%	▲28.1
Liberal	Mrs. Kathleen Bowes	2,036	26%	▼25.1
Labour	Mrs. Beryl Lloyd	335	4%	▼2.3
Majority		3,358	43.25%	▲33.05
Registered electors		14,673		
Turnout		7,765	53%	▼5.2
Conservative gain from Liberal		Swing		

==== Wallasey No.5 (North Liscard-Upper Brighton Street) ====
Wallasey No.5 (North Liscard-Upper Brighton-Street)
Party	Candidate	Votes	%	±%
Conservative	K. W. Porter	3,362	76%	▲36.2
Labour	M. D. Laskier	647	15%	▼2.3
Liberal	J. S. C. Timothy	401	9%	▼29
Majority		2,715	61.56%	▲59.76
Registered electors		11,774		
Turnout		4,410	37%	▼7.8
Conservative hold		Swing	▲36.2	

==== Wallasey No.6 (Seacombe-Poulton-Somerville) ====
Wallasey No.6 (Seacombe-Poulton-Somerville)
Party	Candidate	Votes	%	±%
Labour	J. Gershman *	1,916	46%	▼22.3
Conservative	Mrs. Marie Kemble	1,829	44%	▲12.3
Liberal	P. C. Mawdsley	346	8%	N/A
Communist	R. B. Harris	93	2%	N/A
Majority		87	2.08%	▼33.52
Registered electors		12,427		
Turnout		4,184	34%	▲2.6
Labour hold		Swing		

==== Wirral No.1 (Barnston-Gayton-Heswall-Oldfield) ====
Wirral No.1 Barnston-Gayton-Heswall-Oldfield)
Party	Candidate	Votes	%	±%
Conservative	J. C. Smyth	4,840	88%	▲27.1
Liberal	R. W. Thomas	355	6%	▼23.9
Labour	J. F. Durrant	286	5%	▼4.1
Majority		4,485	81.82%	▲20.92
Registered electors		11,022		
Turnout		5,481	46%	▲5.8
Conservative hold		Swing	▲27.1	

==== Wirral No.2 (Irby-Pensby-Thurstaston) ====
Irby-Pensby-Thurstaston)
Party	Candidate	Votes	%	±%
Conservative	F. K. Burlinson *	3,240	76%	▲13.5
Labour	H. Ellis-Thomas	620	15%	▼22.5
Liberal	G. A. Collins	391	9%	N/A
Majority		2,620	61.63%	▲36.63
Registered electors		9,147		
Turnout		4,251	46%	▼5.3
Conservative hold		Swing	▲13.5	

== Notes ==
• italics denote the sitting councillor • bold denotes the winning candidate
