= 1973 Merseyside County Council election =

1973 UK local government election

- 12 April 1973

All 99 seats to Merseyside County Council 50 seats needed for a majority
- Turnout: 36.7%
	First party	Second party	Third party
	Blank	Blank	Blank
Party	Labour	Conservative	Liberal
Seats won	53	26	19
Popular vote	175,475	143,344	92,524
Percentage	41.3%	33.7%	21.8%
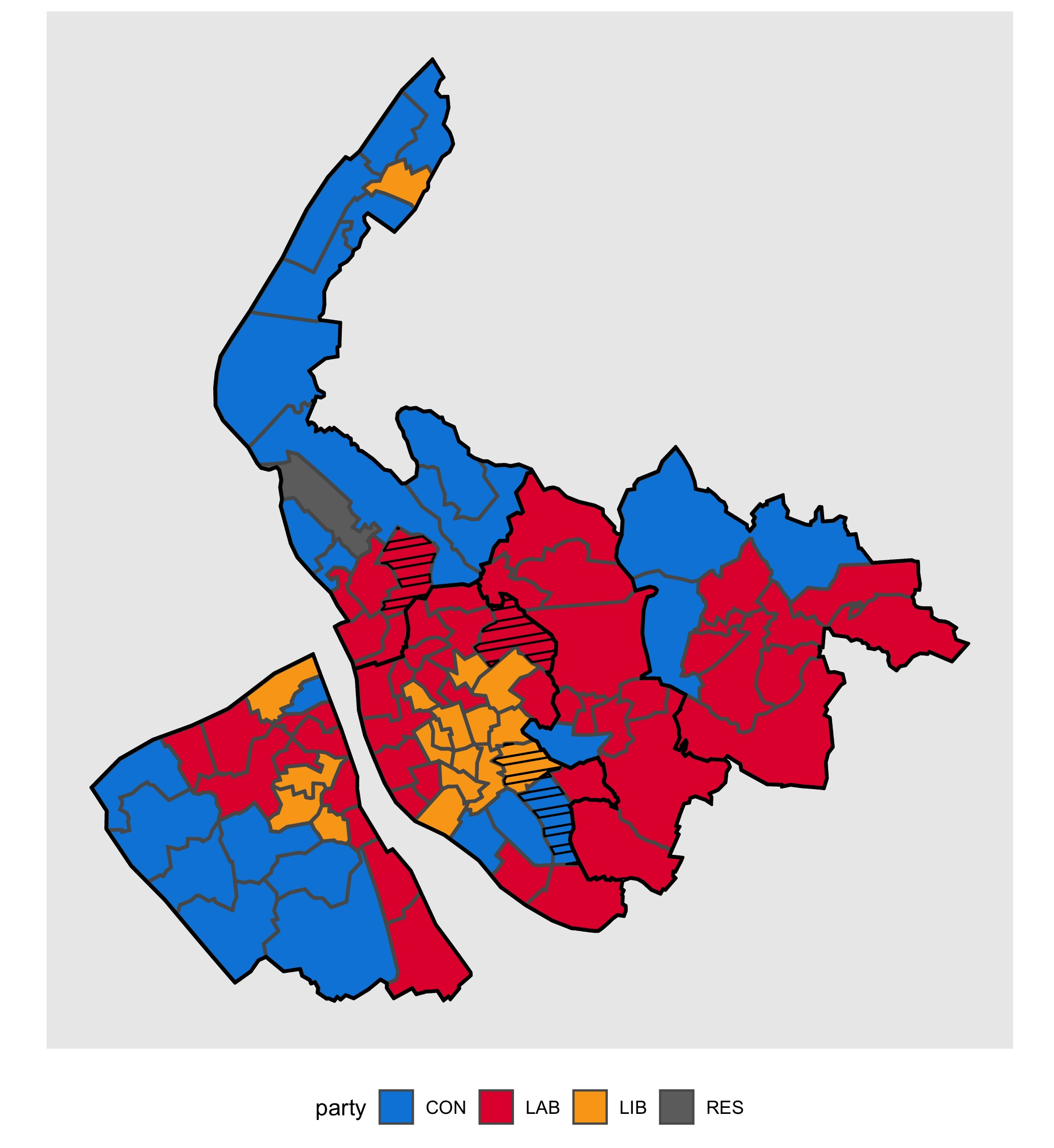
- Map of Merseyside County Council showing wards won by party
Control of Council after election
Labour

The 1973 Merseyside County Council election took place on 12 April 1973 to elect members of Merseyside County Council in England. This was on the same day as other local elections.

There were 95 wards electing the 99 members between them. Two wards, (both in Wirral), were uncontested.

== Election results ==
=== Overall election result ===
New Council.

1973 Merseyside County Council election
Party	Candidates						Votes		
Party	Stood	Elected	Gained	Unseated	Net	% of total	%	No.	Net %
Labour	94	53				53.5	41.3	175,475	
Conservative	94	26				26.3	33.7	143,344	
Liberal	52	19				19.2	21.8	92,524	
Residents	6	1				1.0	1.9	7,996	
Communist	18	0				0	0.7	2,978	
Tenants	1	0				0	0.3	1,184	
Independent	2	0				0	0.2	872	
Ind. Conservative	2	0				0	0.1	397	
Save (political party)	1	0				0	0.1	268	

=== Results by borough ===
==== Knowsley borough ====
Merseyside County Council election results, 1973 (Knowsley)
Party	Candidates			Votes	
Party	Stood	Elected	% of total	%	№
Labour	11	10	90.9	61.3	24,218
Conservative	10	1	9.1	25.2	9,954
Liberal	6	0	0.0	11.5	4,541
Communist	7	0	0.0	2.0	778

Turnout: 31.5%

==== Liverpool borough ====
Merseyside County Council election results, 1973 (Liverpool)
Party	Candidates			Votes	
Party	Stood	Elected	% of total	%	№
Labour	36	18	50.0	40.0	58,840
Liberal	21	14	38.9	29.4	43,285
Conservative	36	4	11.1	29.1	42,772
Ten	1	0	0.0	0.8	1,184
Communist	4	0	0.0	0.4	622
Save	1	0	0.0	0.2	268
Independent	1	0	0.0	0.1	74

Turnout: 34.4%

==== Sefton borough ====
Merseyside County Council election results, 1973 (Sefton)
Party	Candidates			Votes	
Party	Stood	Elected	% of total	%	№
Conservative	19	11	57.9	42.8	36,642
Labour	16	6	31.6	30.7	26,245
Liberal	8	1	5.3	15.5	13,279
Residents	5	1	5.3	9.0	7,704
Communist	5	0	0.0	1.1	902
Independent	1	0	0.0	0.9	798

Turnout: 40.0%

==== St Helens borough ====
Merseyside County Council election results, 1973 (St Helens)
Party	Candidates			Votes	
Party	Stood	Elected	% of total	%	№
Labour	11	9	81.8	56.1	26,428
Conservative	7	2	18.2	27.9	13,154
Liberal	4	0	0.0	15.0	7,045
Communist	1	0	0.0	1.0	485

Turnout: 34.4%

==== Wirral borough ====
Merseyside County Council election results, 1973 (Wirral)
Party	Candidates			Votes	
Party	Stood	Elected	% of total	%	№
Conservative	22	8	36.4	38.6	40,822
Labour	20	10	45.5	37.6	39,744
Liberal	13	4	18.2	23.0	24,374
Ind. Conservative	2	0	0.0	0.4	397
Residents	1	0	0.0	0.3	292
Communist	1	0	0.0	0.2	191

Turnout: 41.1%

== Ward results ==
=== Knowsley ===
==== Huyton With Roby No. 1 (Huyton Farm-Princess-Woolfall) ====
Huyton Farm-Princess-Woolfall
Party	Candidate	Votes	%	±%
Labour	P. Longworth	2,139	83.0	N/A
Conservative	L. Bottley	353	13.7	N/A
Communist	H. Moss	84	3.3	N/A
Majority		1,786	69.3	N/A
Registered electors		9,813		
Turnout			26.3	N/A
Labour win (new seat)				

==== Huyton With Roby No. 2 (Longview and Rupert Farm) ====
Longview and Rupert Farm
Party	Candidate	Votes	%	±%
Labour	S. Hughes	1,824	51.9	N/A
Liberal	C. Lister	835	23.7	N/A
Conservative	R. Lockett	783	22.3	N/A
Communist	W. Hennessey	74	2.1	N/A
Majority		989	28.2	N/A
Registered electors		9,459		
Turnout			37.2	N/A
Labour win (new seat)				

==== Huyton With Roby No. 3 (St Agnes-St Bartholomews-Swanside) ====
St Agnes-St Bartholomews-Swanside
Party	Candidate	Votes	%	±%
Conservative	H. Swainbank	2,660	44.9	N/A
Labour	M. Spillane	2,005	33.8	N/A
Liberal	B. Martin	1,210	20.4	N/A
Communist	R. Leyland	55	0.9	N/A
Majority		655	11.1	N/A
Registered electors		13,273		
Turnout			44.7	N/A
Conservative win (new seat)				

==== Huyton With Roby No. 4 (St Gabriels and St Michaels) ====
St Gabriels and St Michaels
Party	Candidate	Votes	%	±%
Labour	S. Powell	2,464	65.1	N/A
Conservative	F. Kearns	848	22.4	N/A
Liberal	A. Murray	389	10.3	N/A
Communist	W. Bell	82	2.2	N/A
Majority		1,616	42.7	N/A
Registered electors		11,198		
Turnout			33.8	N/A
Labour win (new seat)				

==== Kirkby No. 1 (Central and Minstead) ====
Central and Minstead
Party	Candidate	Votes	%	±%
Labour	J. King	1,782	66.7	N/A
Liberal	A. Dutton	761	28.5	N/A
Communist	S. Donnelly	130	4.9	N/A
Majority		1,021	38.2	N/A
Registered electors		10,832		
Turnout			24.7	N/A
Labour win (new seat)				

==== Kirkby No. 2 (Cherryfield and Whitfield) ====
Cherryfield and Whitfield
Party	Candidate	Votes	%	±%
Labour	D. Smith	1,381	53.3	N/A
Liberal	T. Jones	1,004	38.7	N/A
Conservative	S. Hennessy	105	4.1	N/A
Communist	P. Cunningham	101	3.9	N/A
Majority		377	14.6	N/A
Registered electors		11,339		
Turnout			22.9	N/A
Labour win (new seat)				

==== Kirkby No. 3 (Northwood-Park-Tower Hill-Simonswood) ====
Northwood-Park-Tower Hill-Simonswood
Party	Candidate	Votes	%	±%
Labour	G. Bundred	2,164	72.6	N/A
Conservative	A. Dray	565	19.0	N/A
Communist	T. Bradburn	252	8.5	N/A
Majority		1,599	53.6	N/A
Registered electors		14,372		
Turnout			20.7	N/A
Labour win (new seat)				

==== Prescot ====
Prescot
Party	Candidate	Votes	%	±%
Labour	W. Howarth	2,360	61.2	N/A
Conservative	F. Granby	1,494	38.8	N/A
Majority		866	22.4	N/A
Registered electors		9,035		
Turnout			42.7	N/A
Labour win (new seat)				

==== Whiston No. 1 (Croton-Tarbock-Whiston) ====
Croton-Tarbock-Whiston
Party	Candidate	Votes	%	±%
Labour	R. Foulkes	2,266	65.6	N/A
Conservative	J. Reynolds	1,189	34.4	N/A
Majority		1,077	31.2	N/A
Registered electors		9,924		
Turnout			34.8	N/A
Labour win (new seat)				

==== Whiston No. 3 (Halewood) ====
Halewood
Party	Candidate	Votes	%	±%
Labour	T. Lyons	3,380	72.4	N/A
Conservative	B. Holder	1,289	27.6	N/A
Majority		2,091	44.8	N/A
Registered electors		13,617		
Turnout			34.3	N/A
Labour win (new seat)				

==== Whiston No. 4 (Knowsley) ====
Knowsley
Party	Candidate	Votes	%	±%
Labour	W. Alldritt	2,453	70.8	N/A
Conservative	W. Simpson	668	19.3	N/A
Liberal	M. Traynor	342	9.9	N/A
Majority		1,785	51.5	N/A
Registered electors		12,510		
Turnout			27.7	N/A
Labour win (new seat)				

=== Liverpool ===
==== Liverpool No. 1 (Abercromby and St James) ====
Abercromby and St James
Party	Candidate	Votes	%	±%
Labour	H. Carr	2,432	79.1	N/A
Conservative	E. Smith	364	11.8	N/A
Communist	R. O'Hara	280	9.1	N/A
Majority		2,068	67.3	N/A
Registered electors		13,507		
Turnout			22.8	N/A
Labour win (new seat)				

==== Liverpool No. 2 (Aigburth) ====
Aigburth
Party	Candidate	Votes	%	±%
Conservative	S. Moss	4,162	78.8	N/A
Labour	K. Stewart	1,120	21.2	N/A
Majority		3,042	57.6	N/A
Registered electors		14,688		
Turnout			36.0	N/A
Conservative win (new seat)				

==== Liverpool No. 3 (Allerton) ====
Allerton
Party	Candidate	Votes	%	±%
Conservative	W. Weaver	2,325	55.2	N/A
Liberal	S. Carr	1,183	28.1	N/A
Labour	C. McDonald	705	16.7	N/A
Majority		1,142	27.1	N/A
Registered electors		10,856		
Turnout			38.8	N/A
Conservative win (new seat)				

==== Liverpool No. 4 (Anfield) ====
Anfield
Party	Candidate	Votes	%	±%
Labour	F. McGurk	2,018	38.7	N/A
Liberal	J. Wilmington	1,739	33.4	N/A
Conservative	L. Jones	1,457	27.9	N/A
Majority		279	5.3	N/A
Registered electors		13,161		
Turnout			39.6	N/A
Labour win (new seat)				

==== Liverpool No. 5 (Arundel) ====
Arundel
Party	Candidate	Votes	%	±%
Liberal	N. Wood	2,815	58.3	N/A
Conservative	J. Kendrick	1,042	21.6	N/A
Labour	F. Gaier	973	20.1	N/A
Majority		1,773	36.7	N/A
Registered electors		14,434		
Turnout			33.5	N/A
Liberal win (new seat)				

==== Liverpool No. 6 (Breckfield and St Domingo) ====
Breckfield and St Domingo
Party	Candidate	Votes	%	±%
Liberal	P. Chivall	1,551	45.8	N/A
Labour	L. Williams	1,207	35.7	N/A
Conservative	K. Jacques	626	18.5	N/A
Majority		344	10.1	N/A
Registered electors		11,443		
Turnout			29.6	N/A
Liberal win (new seat)				

==== Liverpool No. 7 (Broadgreen) ====
Broadgreen
Party	Candidate	Votes	%	±%
Labour	B. Wright	3,186	61.9	N/A
Conservative	L. Sanders	1,051	20.4	N/A
Liberal	R. Johnston	911	17.7	N/A
Majority		2,135	41.5	N/A
Registered electors		12,358		
Turnout			41.7	N/A
Labour win (new seat)				

==== Liverpool No. 8 (Central Everton and Netherfield) ====
Central Everton and Netherfield
Party	Candidate	Votes	%	±%
Labour	J. Parry	2,169	75.9	N/A
Conservative	R. Charles	421	14.7	N/A
Save	A. Dooley	268	9.4	N/A
Majority		1,748	61.2	N/A
Registered electors		12,362		
Turnout			23.1	N/A
Labour win (new seat)				

==== Liverpool No. 9 (Childwall) ====
Childwall (2)
Party	Candidate	Votes	%	±%
Liberal	W. Limont	4,289	51.7	N/A
Liberal	W. Smyth	3,807	–	–
Conservative	C. Henry De Boer	2,963	35.7	N/A
Conservative	D. Bushell	2,885	–	–
Labour	L. Caplan	1,047	12.6	N/A
Labour	E. Kelly	955	–	–
Majority		1,335	16.0	N/A
Registered electors		19,102		
Turnout			43.4	N/A
Liberal win (new seat)				
Liberal win (new seat)				

==== Liverpool No. 10 (Church) ====
Church
Party	Candidate	Votes	%	±%
Liberal	Cyril Carr	4,154	63.0	N/A
Conservative	H. Bolton-Jones	2,037	30.9	N/A
Labour	N. Barnett	400	6.1	N/A
Majority		2,117	32.1	N/A
Registered electors		14,436		
Turnout			45.7	N/A
Liberal win (new seat)				

==== Liverpool No. 11 (Clubmoor) ====
Clubmoor
Party	Candidate	Votes	%	±%
Liberal	J. Bowen	2,069	41.9	N/A
Labour	M. Stewart	1,760	35.6	N/A
Conservative	J. Jones	1,110	22.5	N/A
Majority		309	6.3	N/A
Registered electors		10,800		
Turnout			45.7	N/A
Liberal win (new seat)				

==== Liverpool No. 12 (County) ====
County
Party	Candidate	Votes	%	±%
Labour	J. McLean	2,414	59.1	N/A
Conservative	P. Tunna	1,669	40.9	N/A
Majority		745	18.2	N/A
Registered electors		12,602		
Turnout			32.4	N/A
Labour win (new seat)				

==== Liverpool No. 13 (Croxteth) ====
Croxteth
Party	Candidate	Votes	%	±%
Liberal	G. Holmes	3,800	60.2	N/A
Conservative	R. Amyes	1,624	25.7	N/A
Labour	D. Cowley	885	14.0	N/A
Majority		2,176	34.5	N/A
Registered electors		12,667		
Turnout			49.8	N/A
Liberal win (new seat)				

==== Liverpool No. 14 (Dingle) ====
Dingle
Party	Candidate	Votes	%	±%
Labour	M. Evans	1,479	64.1	N/A
Conservative	R. Jones	404	17.5	N/A
Liberal	C. Stocker	345	14.9	N/A
Communist	J. Cook	80	3.5	N/A
Majority		1,075	46.6	N/A
Registered electors		7,597		
Turnout			30.4	N/A
Labour win (new seat)				

==== Liverpool No. 15 (Dovecot) ====
Dovecot
Party	Candidate	Votes	%	±%
Labour	W. Burke	3,043	68.2	N/A
Conservative	J. Walsh	1,418	31.8	N/A
Majority		1,625	36.4	N/A
Registered electors		16,342		
Turnout			31.1	N/A
Labour win (new seat)				

==== Liverpool No. 16 (Fairfield) ====
Fairfield
Party	Candidate	Votes	%	±%
Liberal	C. Crawford	1,598	41.9	N/A
Labour	H. Livermore	1,384	36.3	N/A
Conservative	W. Scott	828	21.7	N/A
Majority		214	5.6	N/A
Registered electors		10,856		
Turnout			35.1	N/A
Liberal win (new seat)				

==== Liverpool No. 17 (Fazakerley) ====
Fazakerley
Party	Candidate	Votes	%	±%
Labour	A. Williams	2,294	57.0	N/A
Conservative	A. Lloyd	1,731	43.0	N/A
Majority		562	14.0	N/A
Registered electors		11,774		
Turnout			34.2	N/A
Labour win (new seat)				

==== Liverpool No. 18 (Gillmoss) ====
Gillmoss (2)
Party	Candidate	Votes	%	±%
Labour	Edward Loyden	3,784	78.4	N/A
Labour	T. Higgins	3,625	–	–
Conservative	D. Dougherty	1,042	21.6	N/A
Conservative	W. Henri	934	–	–
Majority		2,742	56.8	N/A
Registered electors		20,068		
Turnout			24.0	N/A
Labour win (new seat)				
Labour win (new seat)				

==== Liverpool No. 19 (Granby and Princes Park) ====
Granby and Princes Park
Party	Candidate	Votes	%	±%
Labour	Margaret Simey	2,675	68.2	N/A
Conservative	O. Hughes	1,046	26.7	N/A
Communist	T. McClelland	203	5.2	N/A
Majority		1,629	41.5	N/A
Registered electors		15,485		
Turnout			25.3	N/A
Labour win (new seat)				

==== Liverpool No. 20 (Kensington) ====
Kensington
Party	Candidate	Votes	%	±%
Liberal	J. Watton	2,221	58.8	N/A
Labour	Robert Wareing	1,207	31.9	N/A
Conservative	S. Kudrycz	352	9.3	N/A
Majority		1,014	26.9	N/A
Registered electors		9,438		
Turnout			40.1	N/A
Liberal win (new seat)				

==== Liverpool No. 21 (Low Hill and Smithdown) ====
Low Hill and Smithdown
Party	Candidate	Votes	%	±%
Liberal	David Alton	2,282	69.7	N/A
Labour	H. Lee	854	26.1	N/A
Conservative	T. Wingate	139	4.2	N/A
Majority		1,428	43.6	N/A
Registered electors		9,774		
Turnout			33.5	N/A
Liberal win (new seat)				

==== Liverpool No. 22 (Melrose and Westminster) ====
Melrose and Westminster
Party	Candidate	Votes	%	±%
Labour	B. Shaw	2,369	72.8	N/A
Conservative	J. Gillin	885	27.2	N/A
Majority		1,484	45.6	N/A
Registered electors		11,283		
Turnout			28.8	N/A
Labour win (new seat)				

==== Liverpool No. 23 (Old Swan) ====
Old Swan
Party	Candidate	Votes	%	±%
Liberal	D. Jones	3,266	55.9	N/A
Labour	J. Walker	1,505	25.7	N/A
Conservative	H. Davies	1,000	17.1	N/A
Independent	W. McCullough	74	1.3	N/A
Majority		1,761	30.2	N/A
Registered electors		13,442		
Turnout			43.5	N/A
Liberal win (new seat)				

==== Liverpool No. 24 (Picton) ====
Picton
Party	Candidate	Votes	%	±%
Liberal	P. Mahon	2,260	48.9	N/A
Labour	A. Fletcher	1,592	34.5	N/A
Conservative	H. Davies	769	16.6	N/A
Majority		668	14.4	N/A
Registered electors		12,225		
Turnout			37.8	N/A
Liberal win (new seat)				

==== Liverpool No. 25 (Pirrie) ====
Pirrie
Party	Candidate	Votes	%	±%
Labour	H. Dalton	3,638	67.9	N/A
Conservative	R. Gould	1,718	32.1	N/A
Majority		1,920	35.8	N/A
Registered electors		16,059		
Turnout			33.4	N/A
Labour win (new seat)				

==== Liverpool No. 26 (St Marys) ====
St Marys
Party	Candidate	Votes	%	±%
Labour	G. Maudsley	2,155	61.0	N/A
Conservative	G. Hadley	1,375	39.0	N/A
Majority		780	22.0	N/A
Registered electors		10,105		
Turnout			34.9	N/A
Labour win (new seat)				

==== Liverpool No. 27 (St Michaels) ====
St Michaels
Party	Candidate	Votes	%	±%
Liberal	Trevor Jones	2,442	61.3	N/A
Conservative	C. Cowlin	893	22.4	N/A
Labour	R. Graham	589	14.8	N/A
Communist	F. Hennessey	59	1.5	N/A
Majority		1,549	38.9	N/A
Registered electors		10,693		
Turnout			37.2	N/A
Liberal win (new seat)				

==== Liverpool No. 28 (Sandhills and Vauxhall) ====
Sandhills and Vauxhall
Party	Candidate	Votes	%	±%
Labour	W. Sefton	1,760	55.9	N/A
Tenants	J. Stroud	1,184	37.6	N/A
Conservative	P. Rankin	202	6.4	N/A
Majority		576	18.3	N/A
Registered electors		10,501		
Turnout			30.0	N/A
Labour win (new seat)				

==== Liverpool No. 29 (Speke) ====
Speke
Party	Candidate	Votes	%	±%
Labour	Kenneth Stewart	3,010	75.2	N/A
Conservative	D. Collister	992	24.8	N/A
Majority		2,018	50.4	N/A
Registered electors		14,808		
Turnout			27.0	N/A
Labour win (new seat)				

==== Liverpool No. 30 (Tuebrook) ====
Tuebrook
Party	Candidate	Votes	%	±%
Labour	J. Roberts	1,529	38.0	N/A
Liberal	W. Galbraith	1,362	33.8	N/A
Conservative	D. Daniel	1,134	28.2	N/A
Majority		167	4.2	N/A
Registered electors		11,678		
Turnout			34.5	N/A
Labour win (new seat)				

==== Liverpool No. 31 (Warbreck) ====
Warbreck
Party	Candidate	Votes	%	±%
Labour	J. Finnegan	1,957	51.9	N/A
Conservative	R. Flude	1,812	48.1	N/A
Majority		145	3.8	N/A
Registered electors		12,195		
Turnout			30.9	N/A
Labour win (new seat)				

==== Liverpool No. 32 (Woolton East) ====
Woolton East
Party	Candidate	Votes	%	±%
Labour	L. Evans	2,820	74.4	N/A
Conservative	N. Derrick	508	13.4	N/A
Liberal	J. Moxon	461	12.2	N/A
Majority		2,312	61.0	N/A
Registered electors		13,002		
Turnout			29.1	N/A
Labour win (new seat)				

==== Liverpool No. 33 (Woolton West) ====
Woolton West (2)
Party	Candidate	Votes	%	±%
Conservative	L. Williams	3,673	51.8	N/A
Conservative	T. Hobday	3,628	–	–
Liberal	W. Mellor	2,262	31.9	N/A
Liberal	E. Reynolds	2,063	–	–
Labour	K. Jones	1,155	16.3	N/A
Labour	J. Changer	1,096	–	–
Majority		1,411	19.9	N/A
Registered electors		17,839		
Turnout			39.7	N/A
Conservative win (new seat)				
Conservative win (new seat)				

=== Sefton ===
==== Bootle No. 1 (Derby & Stanley) ====
Bootle No. 1 (Derby & Stanley)
Party	Candidate	Votes	%	±%
Labour	Hugh Baird	2,461	60.0	N/A
Conservative	F. Morris	1,508	26.7	N/A
Communist	A. Watts	135	3.3	N/A
Majority		953	23.3	N/A
Registered electors		13,240		
Turnout			31.0	N/A
Labour win (new seat)				

==== Bootle No. 2 (Linacre and Mersey) ====
Linacre and Mersey
Party	Candidate	Votes	%	±%
Labour	W. Wiseman	2,103	70.5	N/A
Conservative	R. Rogerson	687	23.0	N/A
Communist	J. Byrne	192	6.4	N/A
Majority		1,416	47.5	N/A
Registered electors		11,509		
Turnout			25.9	N/A
Labour win (new seat)				

==== Bootle No. 3 (Netherton-Orrell-Sefton) ====
Netherton-Orrell-Sefton (2)
Party	Candidate	Votes	%	±%
Labour	B. Hillen	4,028	60.3	N/A
Labour	A. Weston	3,906	–	–
Conservative	G. Halliwell	2,261	33.8	N/A
Conservative	J. Borrows	2,147	–	–
Communist	R. Morris	395	5.9	N/A
Communist	T. Fenn	341	–	–
Majority		1,767	26.5	N/A
Registered electors		24,169		
Turnout			27.7	N/A
Labour win (new seat)				

==== Crosby No. 1 (Central-College-St Johns) ====
Central-College-St Johns
Party	Candidate	Votes	%	±%
Conservative	N. Goldrein	2,309	44.2	N/A
Residents	J. Connell	1,953	37.4	N/A
Labour	M. Kelly	964	18.4	N/A
Majority		356	6.8	N/A
Registered electors		12,423		
Turnout			42.1	N/A
Conservative win (new seat)				

==== Crosby No. 2 (Christchurch-St Marys-St Thomas) ====
Christchurch-St Marys-St Thomas
Party	Candidate	Votes	%	±%
Labour	L. Hyam	1,683	43.3	N/A
Liberal	H. Fjortoft	1,118	28.2	N/A
Conservative	J. Atherton	1,082	27.9	N/A
Majority		565	15.1	N/A
Registered electors		10,731		
Turnout			36.2	N/A
Labour win (new seat)				

==== Crosby No. 3 (East and Little Crosby) ====
Crosby No. 3 (East and Little Crosby)
Party	Candidate	Votes	%	±%
Residents	A. Tickle	1,607	40.3	N/A
Conservative	W. Bennett	1,472	37.0	N/A
Labour	J. Jones	904	22.7	N/A
Majority		135	3.3	N/A
Registered electors		9,676		
Turnout			41.2	N/A
Residents win (new seat)				

==== Crosby No. 4 (North and West) ====
Crosby No. 4 (North and West)
Party	Candidate	Votes	%	±%
Conservative	F. Prichard	2,827	58.2	N/A
Liberal	M. Hill	2,034	41.8	N/A
Majority		793	16.4	N/A
Registered electors		9,075		
Turnout			53.6	N/A
Conservative win (new seat)				

==== Formby ====
Formby
Party	Candidate	Votes	%	±%
Conservative	K. Thompson	4,691	74.9	N/A
Labour	A. Riley	1,575	25.1	N/A
Majority		3,116	49.8	N/A
Registered electors		16,537		
Turnout			37.9	N/A
Conservative win (new seat)				

==== Litherland ====
Litherland
Party	Candidate	Votes	%	±%
Labour	O. Brady	3,575	58.1	N/A
Conservative	R. Lloyd	2,401	39.0	N/A
Communist	A. Wenton	180	2.9	N/A
Majority		1,174	19.1	N/A
Registered electors		16,515		
Turnout			37.3	N/A
Labour win (new seat)				

==== Southport No. 1 (Ainsdale-Birkdale South) ====
Ainsdale-Birkdale South
Party	Candidate	Votes	%	±%
Conservative	J. Hartley	2,527	48.0	N/A
Liberal	W. Corlett	1,994	37.9	N/A
Labour	J. Entwistle	743	14.1	N/A
Majority		533	10.1	N/A
Registered electors		13,418		
Turnout			39.2	N/A
Conservative win (new seat)				

==== Southport No. 2 (Birkdale East-Birkdale North-South) ====
Southport No. 2 (Birkdale East-Birkdale North-South)
Party	Candidate	Votes	%	±%
Conservative	H. Martland	1,754	38.2	N/A
Labour	J. Corcoran	1,595	34.8	N/A
Liberal	J. McCabe	1,240	27.0	N/A
Majority		159	3.4	N/A
Registered electors		11,286		
Turnout			40.7	N/A
Conservative win (new seat)				

==== Southport No. 3 (Central-Birkdale West-West) ====
Southport No. 3 (Central-Birkdale West-West)
Party	Candidate	Votes	%	±%
Conservative	J. Simms Mitchell	1,726	63.7	N/A
Liberal	D. Collins	985	36.3	N/A
Majority		741	27.4	N/A
Registered electors		9,023		
Turnout			30.0	N/A
Conservative win (new seat)				

==== Southport No. 4 (Craven-Sussex-Talbot) ====
Southport No. 4 (Craven-Sussex-Talbot)
Party	Candidate	Votes	%	±%
Liberal	Ronald Fearn	2,510	48.1	N/A
Conservative	B. Pogson	1,424	27.3	N/A
Labour	K. McNeany	1,286	24.6	N/A
Majority		1,086	20.8	N/A
Registered electors		11,406		
Turnout			45.8	N/A
Liberal win (new seat)				

==== Southport No. 5 (Hesketh and Scarisbrick) ====
Southport No. 5 (Hesketh and Scarisbrick)
Party	Candidate	Votes	%	±%
Conservative	J. Leech	2,484	43.8	N/A
Liberal	P. Handley	1,773	31.3	N/A
Labour	M. Auger	1,408	24.9	N/A
Majority		711	12.5	N/A
Registered electors		10,525		
Turnout			53.8	N/A
Conservative win (new seat)				

==== Southport No. 6 (Marine & Park) ====
Southport No. 6 (Marine and Park)
Party	Candidate	Votes	%	±%
Conservative	G. Walton	2,150	57.0	N/A
Liberal	C. Jackson	1,625	43.0	N/A
Majority		525	14.0	N/A
Registered electors		10,436		
Turnout			36.2	N/A
Conservative win (new seat)				

==== West Lancashire No. 1 (Aintree) ====
Aintree
Party	Candidate	Votes	%	±%
Conservative	A. Birch	1,905	43.3	N/A
Residents	F. Deeks	1,487	33.8	N/A
Labour	I. James	1,009	22.9	N/A
Majority		418	9.5	N/A
Registered electors		9,367		
Turnout			47.0	N/A
Conservative win (new seat)				

==== West Lancashire No. 2 (Maghull East and North-Melling) ====
West Lancashire No. 2 (Maghull East and North-Melling)
Party	Candidate	Votes	%	±%
Conservative	C. Currall	1,915	32.2	N/A
Labour	J. Howard	1,831	30.8	N/A
Residents	J. Geddes	1,408	23.7	N/A
Independent	L. Hancock	798	13.4	N/A
Majority		84	1.4	N/A
Registered electors		13,100		
Turnout			45.4	N/A
Conservative win (new seat)				

==== West Lancashire No. 3 (Maghull South & West-Melling) ====
Aintree
Party	Candidate	Votes	%	±%
Conservative	F. Dykins	1,519	39.5	N/A
Residents	P. Nield	1,249	32.5	N/A
Labour	W. Marshall	1,080	28.1	N/A
Majority		270	7.0	N/A
Registered electors		9,200		
Turnout			41.8	N/A
Conservative win (new seat)				

=== St Helens ===
==== Haydock ====
Haydock
Party	Candidate	Votes	%	±%
Labour	R. Finney	2,926	83.8	N/A
Conservative	B. Chapman	567	16.2	N/A
Majority		2,359	67.6	N/A
Registered electors		11,022		
Turnout			31.7	N/A
Labour win (new seat)				

==== Newton-Le-Willows ====
Newton-Le-Willows
Party	Candidate	Votes	%	±%
Labour	O. Conheeney	3,874	52.1	N/A
Liberal	A. St Leger Sherlock	3,561	47.9	N/A
Majority		313	4.2	N/A
Registered electors		16,022		
Turnout			46.4	N/A
Labour win (new seat)				

==== Rainford ====
Rainford
Party	Candidate	Votes	%	±%
Conservative	A. Berry	3,167	53.5	N/A
Labour	A. Bentham	2,751	46.5	N/A
Majority		416	7.0	N/A
Registered electors		14,053		
Turnout			42.1	N/A
Conservative win (new seat)				

==== St. Helens No. 1 (Central and South Eccleston) ====
St. Helens No. 1 (Central and South Eccleston)
Party	Candidate	Votes	%	±%
Labour	W. Williams	1,801	47.6	N/A
Conservative	J. Hand	1,371	36.2	N/A
Liberal	W. Wagstaff	611	16.2	N/A
Majority		430	11.4	N/A
Registered electors		10,259		
Turnout			36.9	N/A
Labour win (new seat)				

==== St. Helens No. 2 (East Sutton) ====
East Sutton
Party	Candidate	Votes	%	±%
Labour	T. Harvey	2,005	59.5	N/A
Liberal	A. Lycott	1,367	40.5	N/A
Majority		638	19.0	N/A
Registered electors		11,760		
Turnout			28.7	N/A
Labour win (new seat)				

==== St. Helens No. 3 (Hardshaw and West Sutton) ====
St. Helens No. 3 (Hardshaw and West Sutton)
Party	Candidate	Votes	%	±%
Labour	H. Rimmer	2,793	65.0	N/A
Liberal	N. Benbow	1,506	35.0	N/A
Majority		1,287	30.0	N/A
Registered electors		15,565		
Turnout			27.7	N/A
Labour win (new seat)				

==== St. Helens No. 4 (Moss Bank and North Windle) ====
St. Helens No. 4 (Moss Bank and North Windle)
Party	Candidate	Votes	%	±%
Labour	J. Morris	2,407	52.0	N/A
Conservative	C. Martin	2,224	48.0	N/A
Majority		183	4.0	N/A
Registered electors		13,452		
Turnout		4,631	34.4	N/A
Labour win (new seat)				

==== St. Helens No. 5 (North Eccleston and South Windle) ====
North Eccleston and South Windle
Party	Candidate	Votes	%	±%
Labour	T. Forshaw	1,465	59.7	N/A
Conservative	F. Penketh	989	40.3	N/A
Majority		476	19.4	N/A
Registered electors		8,471		
Turnout			29.0	N/A
Labour win (new seat)				

==== St. Helens No. 6 (Parr) ====
St. Helens No. 6 (Parr)
Party	Candidate	Votes	%	±%
Labour	F. Mernagh	3,226	86.9	N/A
Communist	P. Lenahan	485	13.1	N/A
Majority		2,741	73.8	N/A
Registered electors		16,313		
Turnout			22.7	N/A
Labour win (new seat)				

==== Whiston No. 2 (Eccleston and Windle) ====
Whiston No. 2 (Eccleston and Windle)
Party	Candidate	Votes	%	±%
Conservative	G. Brownlow	2,819	73.4%	N/A
Labour	R. Bishop	1,024	26.6	N/A
Majority		1,795	46.8%	N/A
Registered electors		9,404		
Turnout		3,846	40.9%	N/A
Rejected ballots		3		
Conservative win (new seat)				

==== Whiston No. 5 (Rainhill and Bold) ====
Whiston No. 5 (Rainhill and Bold)
Party	Candidate	Votes	%	±%
Labour	W. Jones	2,156	51.7	N/A
Conservative	N. Holley	2,017	48.3	N/A
Majority		139	3.4	N/A
Registered electors		10,497		
Turnout		4,173	39.8	N/A
Labour win (new seat)				

=== Wirral ===
==== Bebington No. 1 (Higher Bebington and Woodhey) ====
Bebington No. 1 (Higher Bebington and Woodhey)
Party	Candidate	Votes	%	±%
Conservative	H. Harriman	2,927	49.8	N/A
Labour	W. Jones	1,834	31.2	N/A
Liberal	A. Snedker	1,118	19.0	N/A
Majority		1,093	18.6	N/A
Registered electors		10,279		
Turnout			57.2	N/A
Conservative win (new seat)				

==== Bebington No. 2 (Park, New Ferry, North Bromborough) ====
Bebington No. 2 (Park, New Ferry, North Bromborough
Party	Candidate	Votes	%	±%
Labour	B. Bryning	3,087	65.9	N/A
Conservative	G. Drew	1,594	34.1	N/A
Majority		1,493	31.8	N/A
Registered electors		9,776		
Turnout		4,681	47.9	N/A
Labour win (new seat)				

==== Bebington No. 3 (South Bromborough and Eastham) ====
South Bromborough and Eastham
Party	Candidate	Votes	%	±%
Labour	A. Rose	3,061	44.6	N/A
Conservative	D. Allan	2,278	33.2	N/A
Liberal	Phillip Gilchrist	1,527	22.2	N/A
Majority		783	11.4	N/A
Registered electors		12,857		
Turnout		6,866	53.4%	N/A
Labour win (new seat)				

==== Bebington No. 4 (Lower Bebington and Poulton) ====
Bebington No. 4 (Lower Bebington and Poulton)
Party	Candidate	Votes	%	±%
Conservative	F. Williams	3,118	47.3	N/A
Liberal	Thomas Harney	1,737	26.4	N/A
Labour	A. Radcliffe	1,732	26.3	N/A
Majority		1,381	20.9	N/A
Registered electors		12,002		
Turnout		6,587	54.9	N/A
Conservative win (new seat)				

==== Birkenhead No. 1 (Argyle-Clifton-Holt) ====
Birkenhead No. 1 (Argyle-Clifton-Holt)
Party	Candidate	Votes	%	±%
Labour	J. Stuart-Cole	2,120	70.6	N/A
Conservative	R. Peers	883	29.4	N/A
Majority		1,237	41.2	N/A
Registered electors		8,985		
Turnout		3,003	33.4	N/A
Labour win (new seat)				

==== Birkenhead No. 2 (Bebington and Mersey) ====
Birkenhead No. 2 (Bebington and Mersey)
Party	Candidate	Votes	%	±%
Labour	C. McRonald	2,010	63.0	N/A
Conservative	M. Winter	1,182	37.0	N/A
Majority		828	26.0	N/A
Registered electors		8,707		
Turnout		3,192	36.7	N/A
Labour win (new seat)				

==== Birkenhead No. 3 (Cathcart-Claughton-Cleveland) ====
Birkenhead No. 3 (Cathcart-Claughton-Cleveland)
Party	Candidate	Votes	%	±%
Liberal	David Griffith Evans	2,521	50.1%	N/A
Labour	J. McDougall	1,471	29.2%	N/A
Conservative	R. Stretch	1,040	20.7%	N/A
Majority		1,050	20.9	N/A
Registered electors		9,993		
Turnout		5,032	50.4	N/A
Liberal win (new seat)				

==== Birkenhead No. 4 (Devonshire and Egerton) ====
Birkenhead No. 4 (Devonshire and Egerton)
Party	Candidate	Votes	%	±%
Liberal	D. Hughes	3,067	50.1	N/A
Conservative	H. Welsh	1,542	25.2	N/A
Labour	W. Bagnall	1,514	24.7	N/A
Majority		1,525	24.9	N/A
Registered electors		12,464		
Turnout			49.1	N/A
Liberal win (new seat)				

==== Birkenhead No. 5 (Gilbrook and St James) ====
Birkenhead No. 5 (Gilbrook and St James)
Party	Candidate	Votes	%	±%
Labour	J. Roberts	2,242	59.5	N/A
Liberal	A. Hayes	1,106	29.3	N/A
Conservative	W. Briggs	421	11.2	N/A
Majority		1,136	30.2	N/A
Registered electors		9,030		
Turnout		3,766	41.7%	N/A
Labour win (new seat)				

==== Birkenhead No. 6 (Grange and Oxton) ====
Birkenhead No. 6 (Grange and Oxton)
Party	Candidate	Votes	%	±%
Liberal	Gordon Lindsay	3,075	52.5	N/A
Conservative	Kenneth Porter	1,687	28.8	N/A
Labour	Arthur Smith	1,100	18.8	N/A
Majority		1,388	23.7	N/A
Registered electors		12,348		
Turnout			47.5	N/A
Liberal win (new seat)				

==== Birkenhead No. 7 (Prenton) ====
Birkenhead No. 7 (Prenton)
Party	Candidate	Votes	%	±%
Conservative	A. Wise	3,422	53.4	N/A
Labour	G. Llewellyn	2,991	46.6	N/A
Majority		431	6.8	N/A
Registered electors		15,882		
Turnout		6,433	40.4	N/A
Conservative win (new seat)				

==== Birkenhead No. 8 (Upton) ====
Birkenhead No. 8 (Upton)
Party	Candidate	Votes	%	±%
Labour	E. Ainslie	3,687	51.1	N/A
Conservative	J. Nixon	3,044	42.2	N/A
Residents	S. Dean	292	4.0	N/A
Communist	K. Thompson	191	2.6	N/A
Majority		643	8.9	N/A
Registered electors		19,861		
Turnout		7,214	36.3	N/A
Labour win (new seat)				

==== Hoylake No.1 (Caldy and Frankby) ====
Hoylake No.1 (Caldy and Frankby)
Party	Candidate	Votes	%	±%
Conservative	H. Needham	Unopposed		
Registered electors		12,684		
Conservative win (new seat)				

==== Hoylake No.2 (Central-Hoose-Meols-Park) ====
Hoylake No. 2 (Central-Hoose-Meols-Park)
Party	Candidate	Votes	%	±%
Conservative	J. Last	Unopposed		
Registered electors		11,992		
Conservative win (new seat)				

==== Wallasey No.1 (Leasowe) ====
Wallasey No.1 (Leasowe)
Party	Candidate	Votes	%	±%
Labour	C. Wells	2,507	59.6	N/A
Conservative	G. Ward	1,094	26.0	N/A
Liberal	D. Franks	604	14.4	N/A
Majority		1,413	33.6	N/A
Registered electors		11,464		
Turnout		4,285	36.7%	N/A
Labour win (new seat)				

==== Wallasey No. 2 (Marlowe, Egremont South & Liscard) ====
Wallasey No.2 (Marlowe, Egremont South & Liscard)
Party	Candidate	Votes	%	±%
Labour	E. Roberts	2,106	40.0%	N/A
Conservative	F. Elliot	2,104	39.9%	N/A
Liberal	Neil Thomas	1,058	20.1	N/A
Majority		2	0.1%	N/A
Registered electors		13,155		
Turnout		5,268	40.0%	N/A
Labour win (new seat)				

==== Wallasey No. 3 (Moreton and Saughall Massie) ====
Wallasey No. 3 (Moreton and Saughall Massie)
Party	Candidate	Votes	%	±%
Labour	C. Allman	1,556	49.6	N/A
Conservative	David Williams	1,094	34.9%	N/A
Liberal	E. Lawrence	486	15.5%	N/A
Majority		462	14.7%	N/A
Registered electors		7,070		
Turnout		3,136	44.4%	N/A
Labour win (new seat)				

==== Wallasey No. 4 (New Brighton-Wallasey-Warren) ====
Wallasey No. 4 (New Brighton-Wallasey-Warren)
Party	Candidate	Votes	%	±%
Liberal	D. Caldwell	4,368	51.1	N/A
Conservative	M. Emberton	3,495	40.9	N/A
Labour	S. Owens	538	6.3	N/A
Ind. Conservative	John Fishwick	139	1.6	N/A
Majority		873	10.2	N/A
Registered electors		14,673		
Turnout			58.2	N/A
Liberal win (new seat)				

==== Wallasey No. 5 (North Liscard-Upper Brighton Street) ====
Wallasey No. 5 (North Liscard-Upper Brighton Street)
Party	Candidate	Votes	%	±%
Conservative	H. Grant	2,099	39.8	N/A
Liberal	P. Tyrer	2,001	38.0	N/A
Labour	G. Watkins	912	17.3	N/A
Ind. Conservative	H. Thompson	258	4.9	N/A
Majority		98	1.8	N/A
Registered electors		11,774		
Turnout		5,270	44.8	N/A
Conservative win (new seat)				

==== Wallasey No. 6 ( Seacombe-Poulton-Somerville) ====
Wallasey No. 6 ( Seacombe-Poulton-Somerville)
Party	Candidate	Votes	%	±%
Labour	J. Gershman	2,994	68.3%	N/A
Conservative	F. Hunter	1,387	31.7%	N/A
Majority		1,607	36.6%	N/A
Registered electors		12,427		
Turnout		4,387	35.3%	N/A
Labour win (new seat)				

==== Wirral No. 1 (Barnston-Gayton-Heswall-Oldfield) ====
Wirral No.1 (Barnston-Gayton-Heswall-Oldfield)
Party	Candidate	Votes	%	±%
Conservative	N. Pannell	3,477	60.9%	N/A
Liberal	G. Collins	1,706	29.9	N/A
Labour	J. Durrant	522	9.1%	N/A
Majority		1,771	31.0%	N/A
Registered electors		11,022		
Turnout		5,705	51.8%	N/A
Conservative win (new seat)				

==== Wirral No. 2 (Irby-Pensby-Thurstaston) ====
Wirral No.2 (Irby-Pensby-Thurstaston)
Party	Candidate	Votes	%	±%
Conservative	F. Burlinson	2,934	62.5%	N/A
Labour	J. Heery	1,760	37.5%	N/A
Majority		1,174	25.0%	N/A
Registered electors		9,147		
Turnout		4,694	51.3%	N/A
Conservative win (new seat)				

== Notes ==
• bold denotes the winning candidate
