= 1959 Liverpool City Council election =

1959 UK local election

← 1958	7 May 1959	1960 →
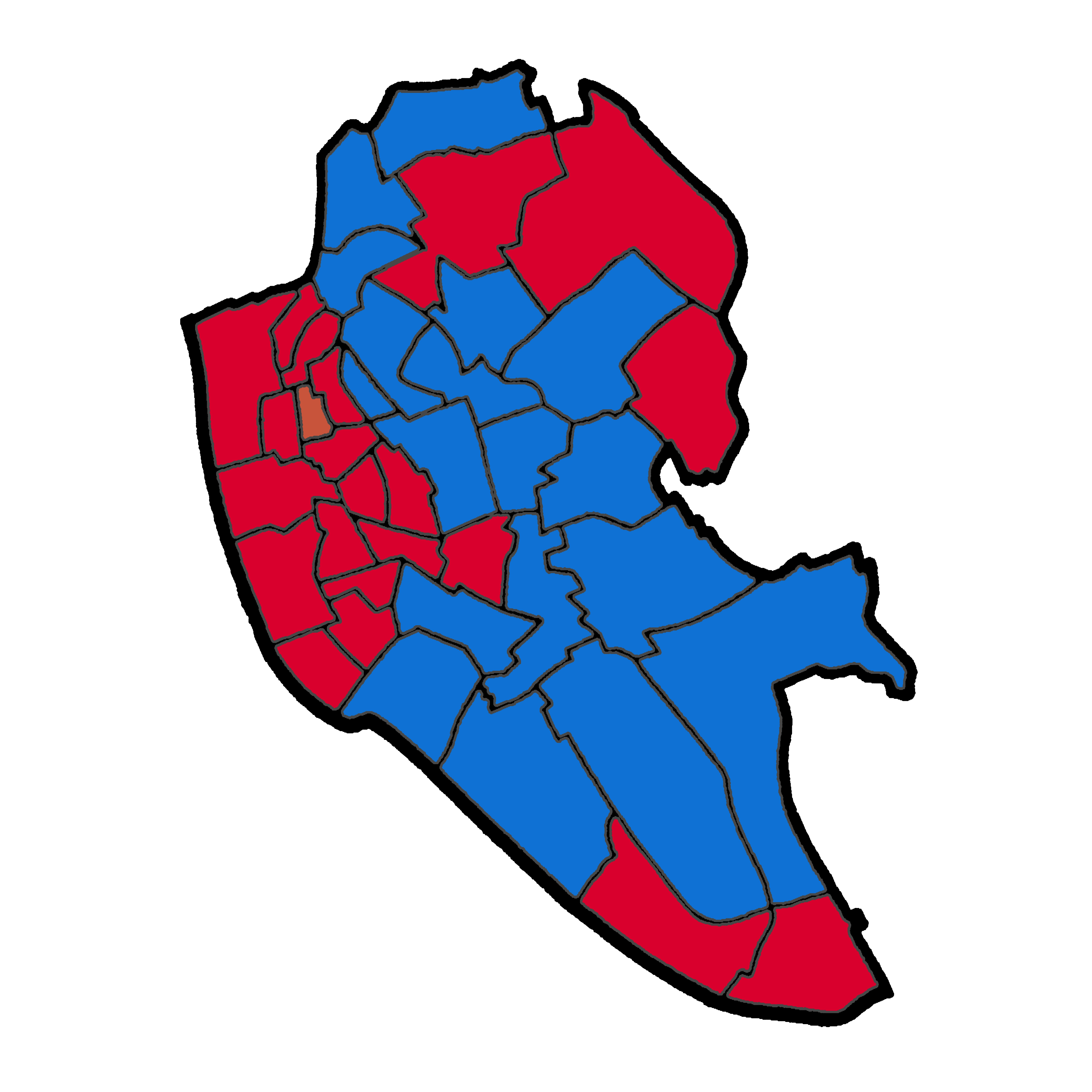
- Map of Liverpool showing wards won (first placed party)

Elections to Liverpool City Council were held on 7 May 1959.

After the election, the composition of the council was:

Party	Councillors	±	Aldermen
Conservative	48	+2	??
Labour	70	-2	??
Protestant	1	0	??
Liberal	0	0	??

== Election result ==
Liverpool local election result 1959
Party	Seats	Gains	Losses	Net gain/loss	Seats %	Votes %	Votes	+/−
Conservative								
Labour								
Liberal								
Protestant								
Communist								

== Ward results ==
* - Councillor seeking re-election

^{(PARTY)} - Party of former Councillor

The Councillors seeking re-election at this election were elected in 1956 for a three-year term, therefore comparisons are made with the 1956 election results.

=== Abercromby ===
Abercromby
Party	Candidate	Votes	%	±%
Labour	Paul Orr *	1,616	55%	+3%
Conservative	A. Lloyd	1,177	40%	+7%
Communist	A. M^{c}Clelland	162	5%	+1%
Majority		439		
Registered electors		10,944		
Turnout		2,955	27%	
Labour hold		Swing		

=== Aigburth ===
Aigburth
Party	Candidate	Votes	%	±%
Conservative	H. M. Allen *	4,612	77	
Labour	J. F. Stevens	279	5	
Liberal	W. Russell Dyson	990	16	
Anti-Debt League	P. Cooney	126	2	
Majority		3,622		
Registered electors		13,936		
Turnout		6,007	43	
Conservative hold		Swing		

=== Allerton ===
Allerton
Party	Candidate	Votes	%	±%
Conservative	C. Haswell *	3,024	81%	
Labour	G. C. Carr	707	19%	
Majority		2,317		
Registered electors		10,297		
Turnout		3,731	36%	
Conservative hold		Swing		

=== Anfield ===
Anfield
Party	Candidate	Votes	%	±%
Conservative	R. F. Craine *	3,927	68%	
Labour	S. Durkee	1,841	32%	
Majority		2,086		
Registered electors		14,400		
Turnout		5,768	40%	
Conservative hold		Swing		

=== Arundel ===
Arundel
Party	Candidate	Votes	%	±%
Conservative	C. Price ^{(PARTY)}	2,936	65%	
Labour	J. M. Burke	1,374	31%	
Communist	J. Kaye	180	4%	
Majority		1,562		
Registered electors		12,531		
Turnout		4,490	36%	
Conservative hold		Swing		

=== Breckfield ===
Breckfield
Party	Candidate	Votes	%	±%
Conservative	S. Airey *	2,273	53%	
Labour	J. E. McPherson	2,013	47%	
Majority		260		
Registered electors		11,455		
Turnout		4,286	37%	
Conservative hold		Swing		

=== Broadgreen ===
Broadgreen
Party	Candidate	Votes	%	±%
Conservative	L. H. Sanders *	2,948	62%	
Labour	N. S. Clark	1,345	28%	
Liberal	J. Reilly	450	9%	
Majority		1,603		
Registered electors		11,838		
Turnout		4,743	40%	
Conservative hold		Swing		

=== Central ===
Central
Party	Candidate	Votes	%	±%
Labour	J. Cullen *	unopposed		
Majority				
Registered electors				
Turnout		8,937		
Labour hold		Swing		

=== Childwall ===
Childwall
Party	Candidate	Votes	%	±%
Conservative	W. J. Serjent *	3,897	66	
Liberal	Albert Globe	1,541	26	
Labour	W. T. Cooper	578	10	
Majority		2,356		
Registered electors		13,978		
Turnout		5,869	42	
Conservative hold		Swing		

=== Church ===
Church
Party	Candidate	Votes	%	±%
Conservative	Mrs. A. E. Papworth *	3,529	60%	
Liberal	Cyril Carr	1,752	30%	
Labour	W. T. Cooper	578	10%	
Majority		1,777		
Registered electors		13,869		
Turnout		5,859	42%	
Conservative hold		Swing		

=== Clubmoor ===
Clubmoor
Party	Candidate	Votes	%	±%
Conservative	L. J. Carr	2,923	55%	
Labour	J. Cassin *	2,351	45%	
Majority		572		
Registered electors		11,791		
Turnout		5,274	45%	
Conservative gain from Labour		Swing		

=== County ===
County
Party	Candidate	Votes	%	±%
Conservative	E. Peat ^{(PARTY)}	3,196	50%	
Labour	J. G. Stanson	3,185	50%	
Majority		11		
Registered electors		14,273		
Turnout		6,381	45%	
Conservative hold		Swing		

=== Croxteth ===
Croxteth
Party	Candidate	Votes	%	±%
Conservative	C. Dickinson ^{(PARTY)}	3,923	75%	
Labour	D. Pierce	931	18%	
Liberal	G. W. Gibson	392	7%	
Majority		2,992		
Registered electors		11,542		
Turnout		5,246	45%	
Conservative hold		Swing		

=== Dingle ===
Dingle
Party	Candidate	Votes	%	±%
Labour	Richard Crawshaw ^{(PARTY)}	2,980	62%	
Conservative	E. A. Sale	1,849	38%	
Majority		1,131		
Registered electors		13,246		
Turnout		4,829	36%	
Labour hold		Swing		

=== Dovecot ===
Dovecot
Party	Candidate	Votes	%	±%
Labour	W. P. Johnson *	2,672	57%	
Conservative	E. Johnson	2,057	43%	
Majority		615		
Registered electors		14,689		
Turnout		4,729	32%	
Labour hold		Swing		

=== Everton ===
Everton
Party	Candidate	Votes	%	±%
Labour	W. Smyth *	2,017	74%	
Conservative	N. Heywood	717	26%	
Majority		300		
Registered electors		11,939		
Turnout		2,734	23%	
Labour hold		Swing		

=== Fairfield ===
Fairfield
Party	Candidate	Votes	%	±%
Conservative	R. Meadows *	2,747	59%	
Labour	A. Williams	1,946	41%	
Majority		801		
Registered electors		14,402		
Turnout		4,693	33%	
Conservative hold		Swing		

=== Fazakerley ===
Fazakerley
Party	Candidate	Votes	%	±%
Conservative	J. W. Tills ^{(PARTY)}	3,244	56%	
Labour	C. P. Wall	2,585	44%	
Majority		659		
Registered electors		12,054		
Turnout		5,829	48%	
Conservative hold		Swing		

=== Gillmoss ===
Gillmoss
Party	Candidate	Votes	%	±%
Labour	G. E. Delooze ^{(PARTY)}	3,205	66%	
Conservative	G. K. McKelvie	1,640	34%	
Majority		1,565		
Registered electors		16,261		
Turnout		4,845	30%	
Labour hold		Swing		

=== Granby ===
Granby
Party	Candidate	Votes	%	±%
Labour	J. D. Hamilton ^{(PARTY)}	1,967	55%	
Conservative	Mrs. R. Dean	1,590	45%	
Majority		377		
Registered electors		11,924		
Turnout		3,557	30%	
Labour hold		Swing		

=== Kensington ===
Kensington
Party	Candidate	Votes	%	±%
Labour	F. Walker *	2,571	58%	
Conservative	A. L. Audley	1,859	42%	
Majority		712		
Registered electors		12,810		
Turnout		4,430	35%	
Labour hold		Swing		

=== Low Hill ===
Low Hill
Party	Candidate	Votes	%	±%
Labour	W. R. Snell ^{(PARTY)}	1,688	62%	
Conservative	T. G. H. Cutts	1,053	38%	
Majority		635		
Registered electors		10,015		
Turnout		2,741	27%	
Labour hold		Swing		

=== Melrose ===
Melrose
Party	Candidate	Votes	%	±%
Labour	T. A. Seagraves *	1,982	64%	
Conservative	S. D. Lunt	1,125	36%	
Majority		857		
Registered electors		9,927		
Turnout		3,107	31%	
Labour hold		Swing		

=== Netherfield ===
Netherfield
Party	Candidate	Votes	%	±%
Protestant	J. Dorman *	1,790	54%	
Labour	G. Sykes	990	30%	
Independent	G. Carmichael	509	15%	
Majority		800		
Registered electors		8,992		
Turnout		3,289	37%	
Protestant hold		Swing		

=== Old Swan ===
Old Swan
Party	Candidate	Votes	%	±%
Conservative	A. N. Bates	3,144	51%	
Labour	R. Buckle ^{(PARTY)}	2,614	43%	
Liberal	W. J. Walger	263	4%	
Communist	Mrs. E. Cohen	115	2%	
Majority		530		
Registered electors		15,562		
Turnout		6,136	39%	
Conservative gain from Labour		Swing		

=== Picton ===
Picton
Party	Candidate	Votes	%	±%
Labour	H. Evans *	2,965	52%	
Conservative	T. Younger	2,697	48%	
Majority		268		
Registered electors		14,552		
Turnout		5,662	39%	
Labour hold		Swing		

=== Pirrie ===
Pirrie
Party	Candidate	Votes	%	±%
Labour	M. Black ^{(PARTY)}	3,984	59%	
Conservative	Mrs, M. Berry	2,631	39%	
Anti-Debt League	J. R. Gradwell	159	2%	
Majority		1,353		
Registered electors		17,227		
Turnout		6,774	39%	
Labour hold		Swing		

=== Prince's Park ===
Prince's Park
Party	Candidate	Votes	%	±%
Labour	J. Sidwell *	2,254	55%	
Conservative	G. Clarke	1,834	45%	
Majority		420		
Registered electors		13,422		
Turnout		4,088	30%	
Labour hold		Swing		

=== Sandhills ===
Sandhills
Party	Candidate	Votes	%	±%
Labour	V. Burke ^{(PARTY)}	2,281	88%	
Conservative	A. C. Bailey	308	12%	
Majority		1,973		
Registered electors		9,101		
Turnout		2,589	28%	
Labour hold		Swing		

=== St. Domingo ===
St. Domingo
Party	Candidate	Votes	%	±%
Labour	F. Keating *	2,302	52%	
Protestant	H. D. Longbottom	2,135	48%	
Majority		2,302		
Registered electors		12,100		
Turnout		4,437	37%	
Labour hold		Swing		

=== St. James ===
St. James
Party	Candidate	Votes	%	±%
Labour	O. J. Doyle ^{(PARTY)}	2,149	78%	
Conservative	S. J. Hamilton	590	22%	
Majority		1,559		
Registered electors		11,079		
Turnout		2,739	25%	
Labour hold		Swing		

=== St. Mary's ===
St. Mary's
Party	Candidate	Votes	%	±%
Labour	H. Crowley *	2,443	54%	
Conservative	J. A. Nolan	1,917	43%	
Anti-Debt League	C. McBride	146	3%	
Majority		526		
Registered electors		11,586		
Turnout		4,506	39%	
Labour hold		Swing		

=== St. Michael's ===
St. Michael's
Party	Candidate	Votes	%	±%
Conservative	A.B. Collins *	2,802	75%	
Labour	W. T. Benn	739	20%	
Anti-Debt League	P. G. Connor	190	5%	
Majority		2,063		
Registered electors		10,085		
Turnout		3,731	37%	
Conservative hold		Swing		

=== Smithdown ===
Smithdown
Party	Candidate	Votes	%	±%
Labour	Mrs. E. E. Wright ^{(PARTY)}	2,068	67%	
Conservative	H. Hawkins	1,009	33%	
Majority		1,059		
Registered electors		12,765		
Turnout		3,077	24%	
Labour hold		Swing		

=== Speke ===
Speke
Party	Candidate	Votes	%	±%
Labour	T. Higgins *	2,399	58%	
Conservative	G. MacDonald	1,565	38%	
Ratepayers Protection	G. Maher	148	4%	
Majority		834		
Registered electors		14,502		
Turnout		4,112	28%	
Labour hold		Swing		

=== Tuebrook ===
Tuebrook
Party	Candidate	Votes	%	±%
Conservative	J. F. Bradley *	3,124	57%	
Labour	S. F. Jacobs	2,336	43%	
Majority		788		
Registered electors		13,188		
Turnout		5,460	41%	
Conservative hold		Swing		

=== Vauxhall ===
Vauxhall
Party	Candidate	Votes	%	±%
Labour	A. Dunford *	1,518	95%	
Communist	R. Cuerdon	82	5%	
Majority		1,518		
Registered electors		9,581		
Turnout		1,600	17%	
Labour hold		Swing		

=== Warbreck ===
Warbreck 2 seats
Party	Candidate	Votes	%	±%
Conservative	F. Wolfenden	3,627	65%	
Conservative	R. J. McLaughlin	3,530	63%	
Labour	Mrs. C. A. George	1,965	35%	
Labour	Eddie Loyden	1,852	33%	
Majority		1,662		
Registered electors		13,415		
Turnout		5,592	42%	
Conservative hold		Swing		
Conservative hold		Swing		

=== Westminster ===
Westminster
Party	Candidate	Votes	%	±%
Labour	H. Lee *	1,693	55%	
Conservative	J. Gillin	1,387	43%	
Majority		306		
Registered electors		7,833		
Turnout		3,080	39%	
Labour hold		Swing		

=== Woolton ===
Woolton
Party	Candidate	Votes	%	±%
Conservative	G. F. Catlin *	4,215	75%	
Labour	W. Lungley	1,417	25%	
Majority		2,798		
Registered electors		15,021		
Turnout		5,632	37%	
Conservative hold		Swing		
