= Merseyside County Council =

Former English council

Coordinates: 53.415°N 2.992°W

- Coat of arms of the Merseyside County Council

Type
- Type: County council of Merseyside

History
- Established: 1 April 1974
- Disbanded: 31 March 1986
- Succeeded by: Knowsley; Liverpool; Sefton; St Helens; Wirral
- Seats: 99

Elections
- First election: 12 April 1973
- Last election: 7 May 1981

Meeting place
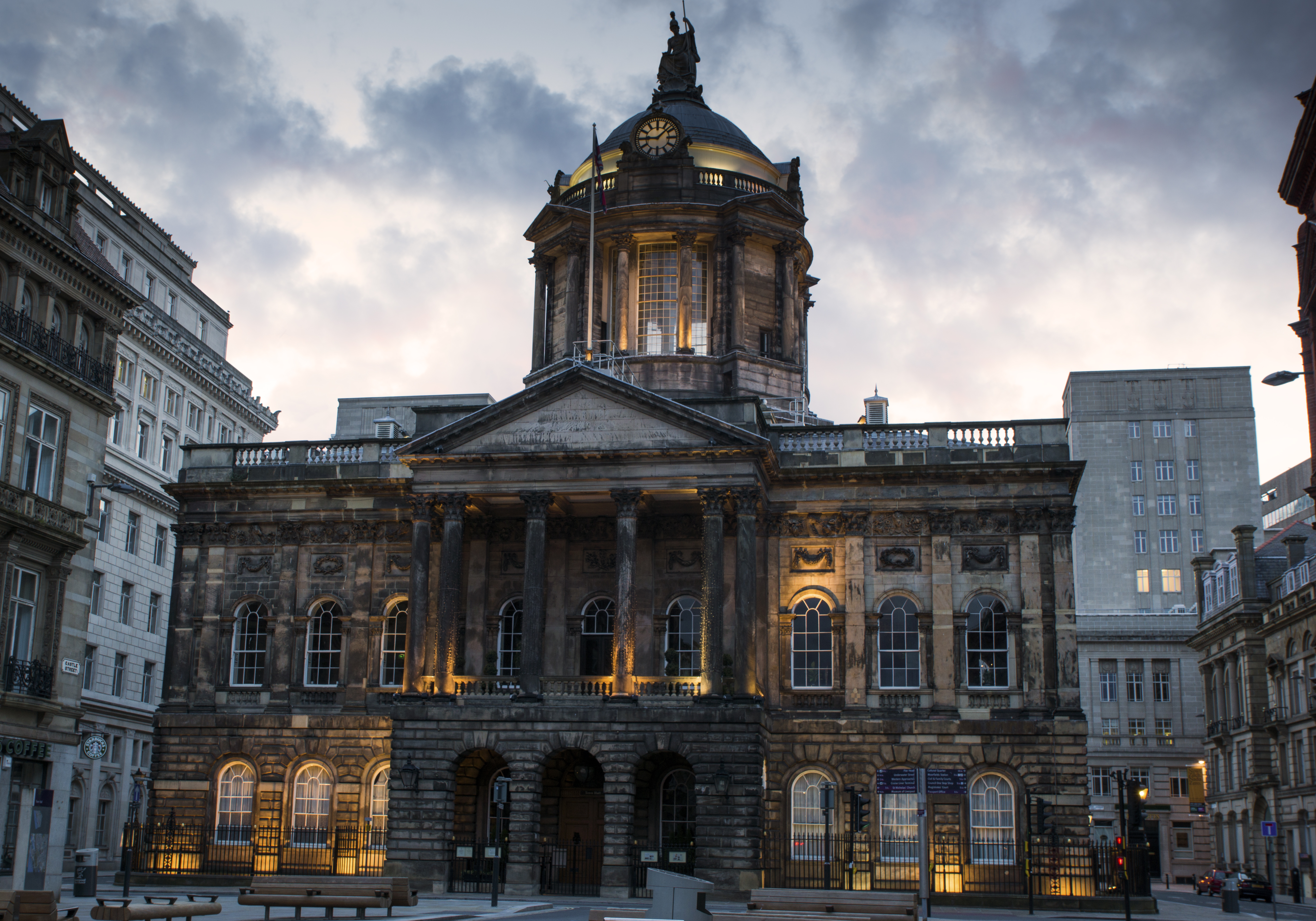
- Liverpool Town Hall

Merseyside County Council (MCC) was, from 1974 to 1986, the upper-tier administrative body for Merseyside, a metropolitan county in North West England.

MCC existed for a total of twelve years. It was established on 1 April 1974 by the Local Government Act 1972. Along with the other five metropolitan county councils and the Greater London Council, it was abolished on 31 March 1986 by the Thatcher government.

== Premises ==
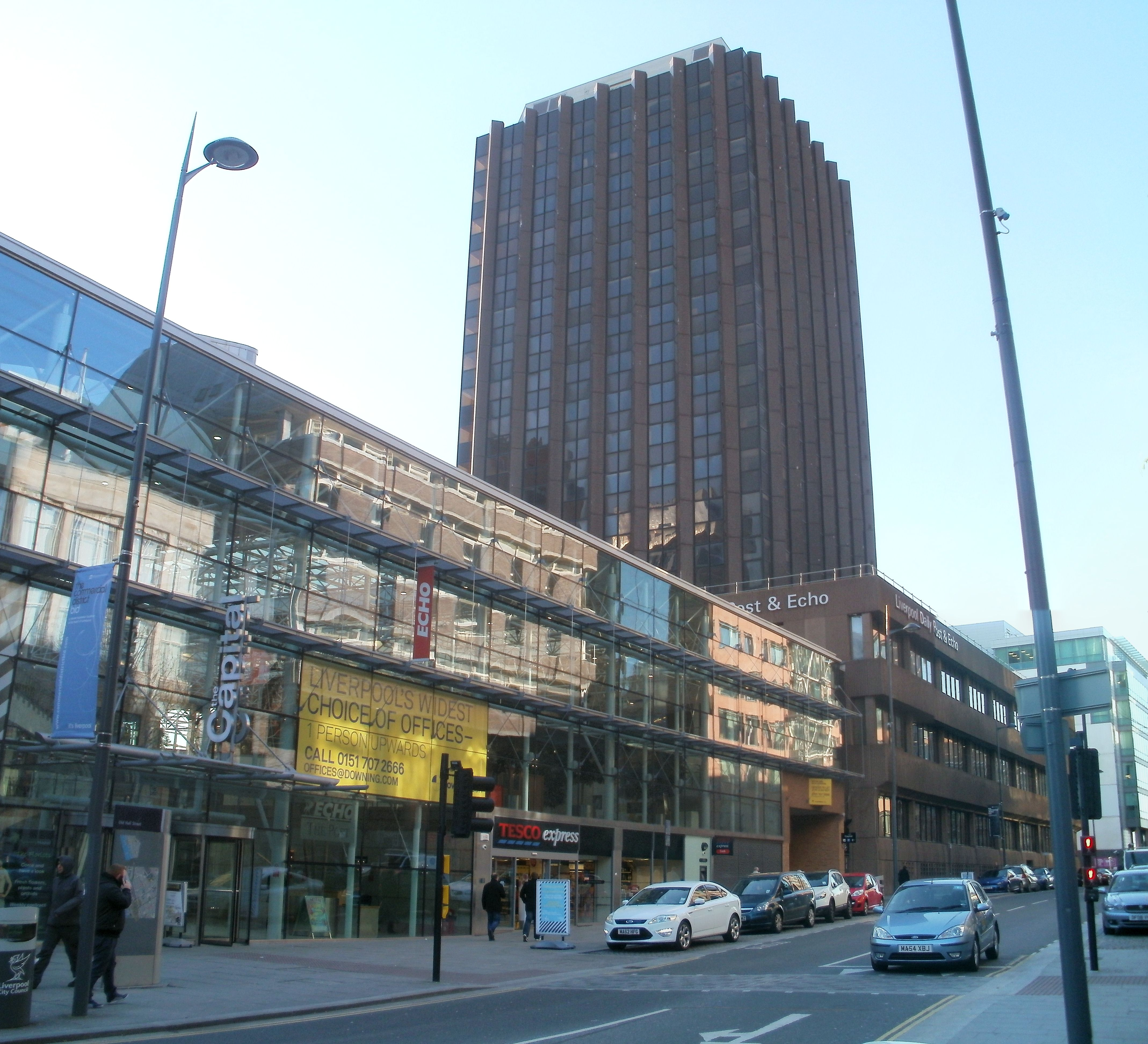
Metropolitan House, 95 Old Hall Street, Liverpool: Council's main offices

The county council had its main administrative offices at Metropolitan House at 95 Old Hall Street in Liverpool, renting part of the building from its owners, the Liverpool Echo and Daily Post newspaper group. The county council held its meetings at Liverpool Town Hall.

== Political control ==
The first election to the council was held in 1973, initially operating as a shadow authority before coming into its powers on 1 April 1974. Political control of the council from 1974 until its abolition in 1986 was as follows:

Party in control	Years
Labour	1974–1977
Conservative	1977–1981
Labour	1981–1986

=== Leadership ===
Until 1980, the leader of the council also held the formal role of chairman of the council. In 1980 the two roles were separated, with the chairmanship becoming largely ceremonial whilst political leadership was provided by the leader of the council. The first leader and chairman of the county council, Bill Sefton, had been the last leader of Liverpool City Council before the 1974 reforms took effect. The leaders of Merseyside County Council were:

Councillor	Party	From	To
Bill Sefton	Labour	1 Apr 1974	May 1977
Kenneth Thompson	Conservative	May 1977	Oct 1980
Neville Goldrein	Conservative	Oct 1980	May 1981
Jim Stuart-Cole	Labour	May 1981	Mar 1982
Keva Coombes	Labour	Mar 1982	31 Mar 1986

== Abolition ==
The Conservative government abolished Merseyside County Council on 31 March 1986 under the Local Government Act 1985, along with the other five metropolitan county councils and the Greater London Council. Its powers devolved to the five metropolitan boroughs – Knowsley, Liverpool, Sefton, St Helens and Wirral – which thus became effectively unitary authorities.

Certain of the county council's powers were taken up by joint authorities consisting of members of each borough council; some of these bodies were mandated by the 1985 act and some by order of the secretary of state, while others were voluntary arrangements. The joint bodies included:

- Merseyside Fire and Civil Defence Authority (now Merseyside Fire and Rescue Service)
- Merseyside Passenger Transport Authority (now branded as Merseytravel)
- Merseyside Police Authority (replaced by the Merseyside Police and Crime Commissioner)
- Merseyside Waste Disposal Authority (now Merseyside Recycling and Waste Authority)
- Merseyside County Trading Standards Joint Committee

== Council elections ==
- 1973 Merseyside County Council election
- 1977 Merseyside County Council election
- 1981 Merseyside County Council election
