= Cyril Carr =

British politician

Cyril Eric Carr CBE (1926 – 1 November 1981) was a British Liberal Party politician.

Living in Liverpool, Carr became the senior partner in a legal firm. He was active in the Liverpool Liberal Party, and was elected to Liverpool City Council in 1962. He focused on building the party's strength in the city, and served as chairman of the Liberal Party nationally from 1972 for a year. In 1974, the Liberals became the largest party in Liverpool, and Carr served for a year as leader of the council.

Also in 1974, Carr involved himself in successful negotiations to release the Pentecostal minister David Hathaway from prison in Czechoslovakia, where he had been charged with distributing religious literature. In 1975, he proposed the addition of "Social Democrat" to the Liberal Party's name, as he believed that this would appeal to both Labour Party and some Conservative Party voters. This suggestion was not taken up until the 1988, when the Liberals merged with the Social Democratic Party.

Carr died aged 55 in 1981, and is buried in Broadgreen Jewish Cemetery, Liverpool.

Party political offices
Preceded by Richard Wainwright	Chairman of the Liberal Party; 1972–1973	Succeeded by Kenneth Vaus
Political offices
Preceded by Bill Sefton	Leader of Liverpool City Council; 1974	Succeeded by Bill Smythe
