= William Sefton, Baron Sefton of Garston =

British Labour Party politician

The Right Honourable The Lord Sefton of Garston

Member of the House of Lords
- Lord Temporal
- Life peerage 3 May 1978 – 9 September 2001

Personal details
- Born: 5 August 1915
- Died: 9 September 2001 (aged 86)

William Henry Sefton, Baron Sefton of Garston (5 August 1915 – 9 September 2001) was a British Labour Party politician.

Born in Garston, Liverpool to a working-class family in 1915, Sefton was a plumber by trade. He became a trade unionist and joined the Labour Party in 1949. In 1953, he was elected to the Liverpool City Council. He was leader of the Liverpool City Council from 1964 to 1974 and Chairman of the Merseyside County Council from 1974 to 1977.

He stood in the 1959 general election as the Labour candidate for Liverpool Toxteth, but lost. He remarked afterward that "I don't think I could stand parliament, even being a minister. The best thing you could do is blow the place up."

In 1978, he was made a life peer as Baron Sefton of Garston, of Garston in the County of Merseyside. His acceptance of the title caused surprise, as he was a self-described Marxist. In the House of Lords, he was known for his outspokenness. Famously, in a 1988 debate concerning the Education Reform Bill, Sefton asked Graham Leonard, the Bishop of London, whether the Virgin Birth was to be believed. Baroness Seear moved "that the noble Lord be no longer heard", which passed without a division, thus stopping Sefton's speech.

Sefton married Phyllis Kerr in 1940; she died in 1991. He later married Evelyn Pimlett in 2000. He died on 9 September 2001, aged 86.

| Preceded by John Braddock | Leader of Liverpool City Council; 1963-67 | Succeeded by Harold Macdonald Steward |

| Preceded by Harold Macdonald Steward | Leader of Liverpool City Council; 1972-74 | Succeeded by Cyril Carr |
