= Northumbria (modern) =

Area in North East England

- Region
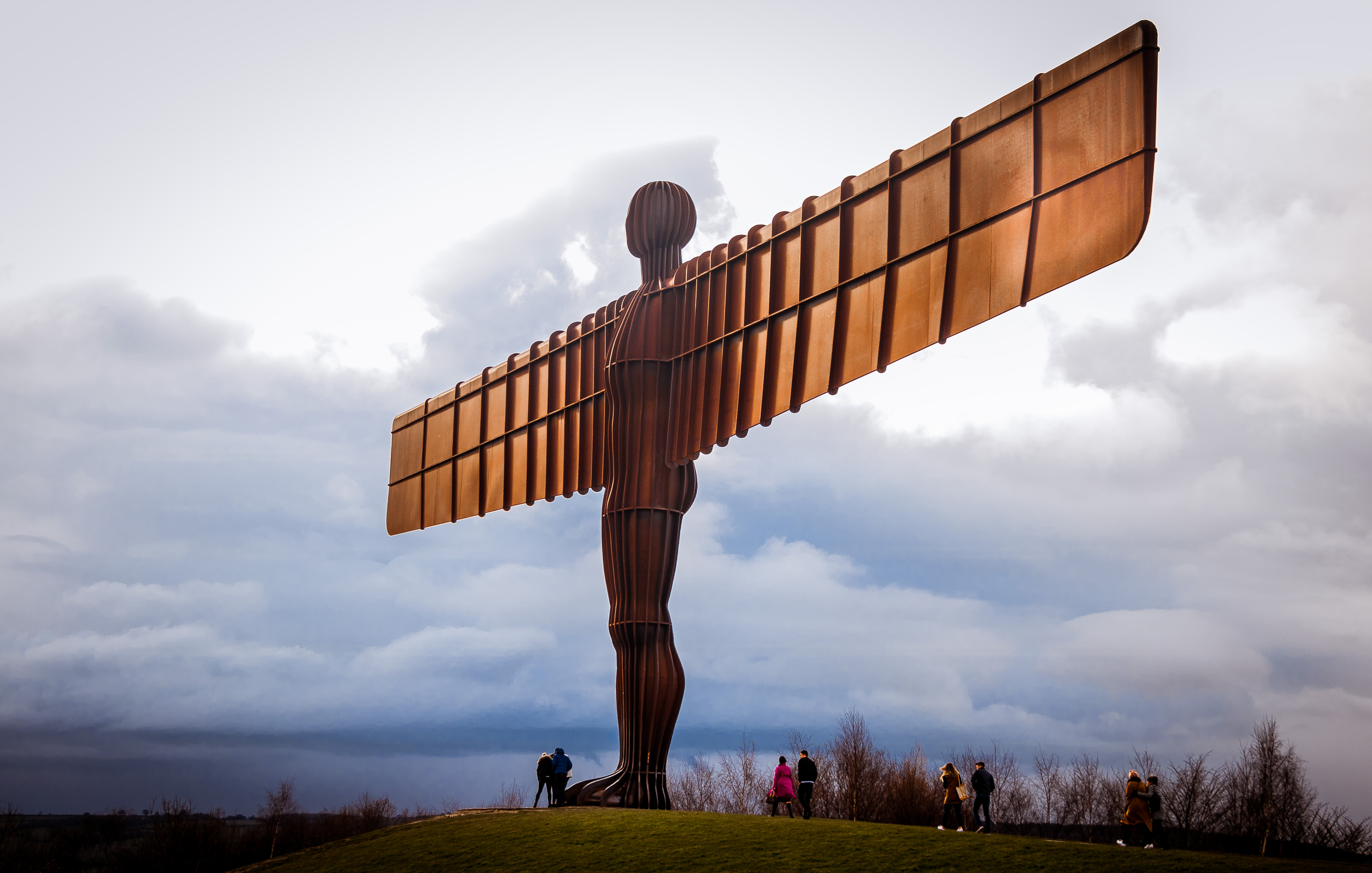
- Angel of the North

- Flag
- Etymology: Old English “Norþanhymbre” meaning "the people or province north of the Humber".
- Dark red marks Northumberland and Durham, which formed the late medieval rump earldom of Northumbria. Light red marks English counties that were part of the Kingdom of Northumbria at its height of power in the 8th century.
- Sovereign state: United Kingdom
- Country: England
- Region: North East England and Northern England

Northumbria, in modern contexts, usually refers to the region of England between the Tees and Tweed, including the historic counties of Northumberland and Durham, but it is often taken to be a synonymous with North East England. The area corresponds to the Viking-age rump of the Kingdom of Northumbria to the north of the Tyne, alongside the Patrimony of St Cuthbert, which lay between the Tyne and Tees. It further corresponds to the Norman-era county of Northumberland, or Comitatus Northumbriae, which originally encompassed the entire area between the Tweed to the Tees. A provincial flag of Northumbria has been registered.

== Definition ==
Precise definitions vary, but they typically centre around the historic counties of Northumberland and Durham; the ceremonial counties of Northumberland, Durham and Tyne and Wear; or the region of North East England. Parts of historic Yorkshire and ceremonial North Yorkshire are sometimes included.

"Northumbria" appears in the names of several institutions and companies:

- Northumbria Police and Northumbria Police and Crime Commissioner: Northumberland and Tyne and Wear
- Northumbria University: non-geographic
- The Natural History Society of Northumbria, Environment Agency and Britain in Bloom: North East England
- Northumbria Healthcare NHS Foundation Trust: historic Northumberland
- Northumbria River Basin district: North East England excluding the Tweed drainage basin; managed by the Northumbria Regional Flood and Coastal Committee (RFCC)
- Northumbrian University Officers' Training Corps (UOTC): Durham, Newcastle, Northumbria, Sunderland, and Teesside Universities
- Northumbrian Water: North East England excluding Hartlepool

== Historical background ==
=== Roman ===
Hadrian's Wall was one of the frontiers of the Roman Empire. Roman remains can be found widely across North East England. A special exhibition based around the Roman Fort of Segedunum at Wallsend and the other forts along Hadrian's Wall is complemented by the numerous artefacts that are displayed in the Great North Museum Hancock in Newcastle.

St. Peter's Church in Monkwearmouth, Sunderland, and St Paul's in Jarrow also hold significant historical value, and have made a joint bid to become a World Heritage Site.

=== Angles ===
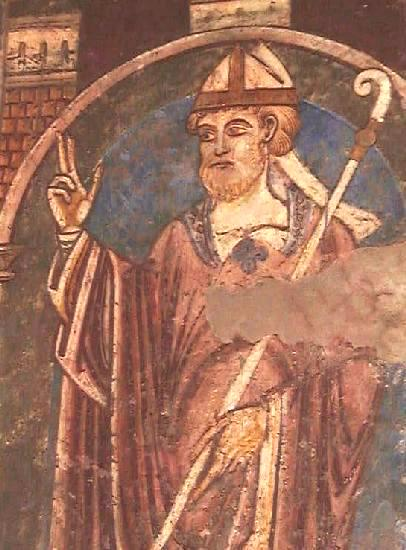
12th-century wall-painting of St Cuthbert in Durham Cathedral

The area has a strong religious past, as can be seen in works such as the Lindisfarne Gospels and the Anglo-Saxon Chronicle. The works of Cuthbert (634–687 AD), Bede (673–735 AD) and Hilda of Whitby (614–680 AD) were hugely influential in the early church, and are still venerated by some today. These saints are usually associated with the monasteries on the island of Lindisfarne, Wearmouth-Jarrow, and the Abbey at Whitby, though they are also associated with many other religious sites in the region. Bede is regarded as the greatest Anglo-Saxon scholar. He worked at the monasteries of Wearmouth and Jarrow, translating some forty books in all areas of knowledge, including nature, history, astronomy, poetry and theological matters such as the lives of the saints. His best known work is "The Ecclesiastical History of the English People". One of the most famous pieces of art and literature created in the region is the Lindisfarne Gospels, thought to be the work of a monk named Eadfrith, who became Bishop of Lindisfarne in 698. This body of work is thought to have been created in honour of Cuthbert, around 710–720.

At its greatest extent, the Anglo-Saxon Kingdom of Northumbria extended from the Scottish borders (then Pictish borders) at the Firth of Forth to the north, and to the south of York, its capital, down to the Humber and Mersey. On 6 June 793 the Vikings arrived on the shores of north-east England with a raiding party from Norway who attacked the monastic settlement on Lindisfarne. The monks fled or were slaughtered, and Bishop Higbald sought refuge on the mainland. A chronicler recorded: "On the 8th June, the harrying of the heathen miserably destroyed God's church by rapine and slaughter." There were three hundred years of Viking raids, battles and settlement until William the Conqueror defeated King Harold at Hastings in 1066.

England in the late ninth century.

In 866 Ivar the Boneless gained control over the southern portion of Northumbria and founded Scandinavian Kingdom of York, which encompassed the lands between the Humber and Tees. The lands north of the Tyne lay outside the immediate control of the Scandinavian Kings, remaining under the rule of the Anglian Earls of Bamburgh or Kings of the North Saxons, successors to the Bernician and later Northumbrian kings. The Community of St. Cuthbert or Haliwerfolc, successors to the See of Lindisfarne, gained control of expansive estates between Tyne and Tees, which formed an ecclesiastical buffer polity between Bamburgh and Jorvik. Both Bamburgh and the Community of St. Cuthbert presented themselves as the successors of the Kingdom of Northumbria. The Anglo-Saxon Chronicle notes the change from raiding to settlement when it records that in 876 the Vikings "Shared out the land of the Northumbrians and they proceeded to plough and support themselves" However, Scandinavian settlement was concentrated south of the Tees. This is attested by place-name evidence, which suggests that County Durham and Northumberland largely avoided Scandinavian settlement, in contrast to Yorkshire and other parts of Northern England.

In 954 the West Saxon Kings conquered the Kingdom of York, eventually integrating it as a shire within the new English kingdom. The administrative system of shires and hundreds did not extent beyond the Tees with the lands north thereof being left under the control of its native rulers: the Earls of Bamburgh and Community of St Cuthbert. The Scottish victory at the Battle of Carham in 1018, after which Lothian was annexed by the Kingdom of Scotland, set Northumbria's northern frontier on the Tweed rather than the Forth. By the end of the Anglo-Saxon era, the term 'Northumbria' had become restricted in reference to the region between the Tweed and Tees. In the Chronicle of 1065, Norðhymbralande ('Northumberland' or 'Northumbria') was already contrasted with Eoforwicscire ('Yorkshire'). Henry of Huntingdon described northern England as consisting of three counties: the Bishopric of Carlisle, Yorkshire and Northumberland ("over which the Bishop of Durham presides").

=== Normans ===
The County of Northumberland or Comitatus Northumbriae was formed from the rump of Northumbria following the Norman conquest of England, a single royal county encompassing all of north-eastern England between the Tweed and Tees. The county included several 'royal liberties' where the king's writ did not run, including Hexhamshire, which was ruled by the Archbishops of York; and Liberty of Tynedale, which was ruled by the Kings of Scotland for much of the 13th century. The largest and most important liberty was that of the Liberty of Durham, which retained a high degree of autonomy under the Bishops of Durham and lacked representation in the lower parliament. Originally, large swathes of land on north bank of the Tees lay outside of the liberty and formed the Wapentake of Sadberge, which consisted of a collection of exclaves ruled directly by the Earls of Northumberland. Sadberge was purchased by bishop Hugh de Puiset in 1189 and gradually incorporated into the County Palatine; it retained separate assizes until 1586.

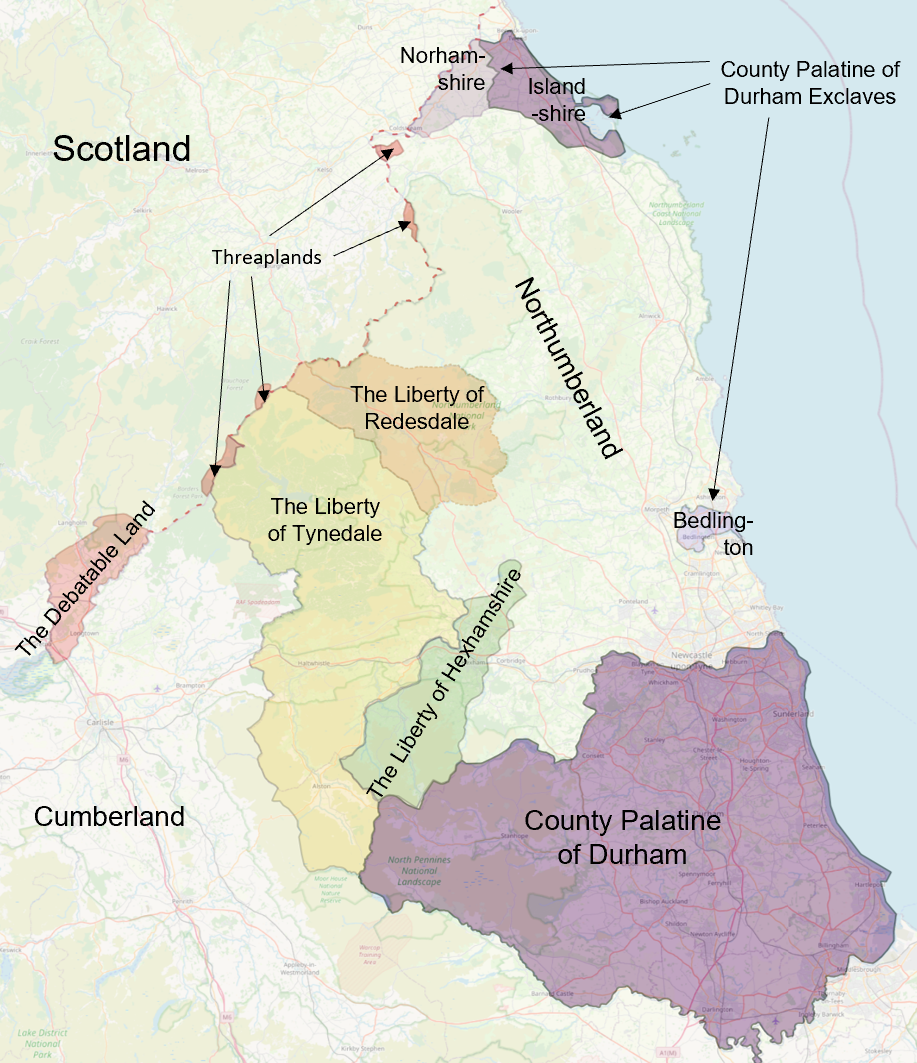
Map of the complex overlying secular and religious powers in the late medieval period Northumberland

The crown regarded Durham as part of Northumberland until the late 13th century. In 1293 the Bishop of Durham and his steward failed to attend proceedings of quo warranto held by the justices of Northumberland. The bishop's case was heard in Parliament, where he stated that Durham lay outside the bounds of any English shire. The arguments appear to have been accepted, as by the fourteenth century Durham was accepted as a liberty which received royal mandates direct. In effect it was a private shire, with the bishop appointing his own sheriff. The area thus became known as the "County Palatine of Durham". Hexhamshire, which had been transferred to the See of York by Henry I, was first referred to as a separate County Palatinate in the 14th century. However, in 1572 it was reintegrated into Northumberland proper. From thereon, the region would be permanently divided into two separate counties: the County of Northumberland and County Palatine of Durham.

In many ways, the governance of Northumbria between the Tweed and Tees had more in common with the highly fragmented governmental landscapes of the March of Wales and of English Ireland than with much of midland and southern England. Though forming a remote and quite distinct English "border region", Northumberland and Durham had developed notable social and political differences. Durham was governed as a semi-independent Prince-Bishopric under the rule of the Bishops of Durham, while Northumberland, being more isolated and vulnerable to Scottish attacks, formed the English East and Middle Marches, subject to the Lord Warden of the Marches. Parts of Northumberland were divided into liberties and shires, which, like Durham, were often exempt from the writ of the King.

=== Victorian era ===
Northumbria, in the modern sense, emerged as a concept in the 19th century. During the second half of the 19th century a cultural movement appeared among the north-eastern intelligentsia who sought to identify the region as a distinct historic nation. The old kingdom of Northumbria was its underlying inspiration, albeit with medieval and early modern histories woven in as well, and the historic counties of Northumberland and Durham were its homeland. In 1834 the Surtees Society was established with focus on publishing 'manuscripts illustrative of the history of the ancient kingdom of Northumbria, principally of County Durham and Northumberland'. The influence of Northumbrian romantic regionalism is most apparent in the development of a distinctly 'Northumbrian' musical identity, differentiated from English folk music as a whole, and compounded in publications such as the Northumbrian Minstrelsy and Rhymes of Northern Bards by drawing upon earlier works from both Northumberland and County Durham. In some sense, the movement paralleled the Irish, Scottish, and Welsh home ruler movements of the time, but unlike the former, did not cross the boundary from unionism to separatism and ultimately remained a cultural movement. Today, the term has been re-established as a legitimate moniker for the region, however, is not the official name for the UK region of North East England.

=== Modern ===
The notion of a modern Northumbria was institutionalised in the late 20th century as the name was adopted by a number of regional institutions in the North East, namely the Northumbria Tourist Board, Northumbria Police, Northumbria University and Northumbrian Water.

== Culture ==
Northumbrian culture has aspects in common with the cultures of both England and Scotland, but also includes many unique traditions not found outside of the region. Northumbria is known for its distinctive musical culture and has its own unique instrument, the Northumbrian smallpipe. The region is associated with numerous folk arts such as Durham/North Country Quilting, Northumbrian pipe-making, horn stick work and hooky mat making, which flourished due to 19th and early 20th.

Northumbria has its own tradition of Christian saints that have given rise to localised dedications. St. Cuthbert is of particular significance; annual St. Cuthbert's day celebrations are held each year by the Northumbrian Association and marked by a walk from Chester-le-Street to Durham, followed by a procession through Durham city.

=== Music ===
Northumbria possesses a distinctive style of folk music characterised by border balladry, use of the Northumbrian smallpipes and strong fiddle tradition that was already well-established in the 1690s.

==== Blaydon Races ====
The Blaydon Races, a popular musical hall song first sung by Geordie Ridley at Balmbra's Music Hall in Newcastle in 1862, gives an idea of some of the characters attending the old meetings. These races were held on an island in the middle of the Tyne and were last held on 2 September 1916. A riot broke out after the winning horse was disqualified, and the event was discontinued. It is remembered in the famous English folk song The Blaydon Races, and the event and its characters are vividly depicted in William Irving's 1903 painting. 'The Blaydon Races – A Study from Life' which is on show at the Shipley Art Gallery in Gateshead.

=== Folklore ===
The Germanic dragon or worm is a common aspect of Northumbrian folklore, notable examples from the region include the Lambton Worm, Sockburn Worm and Laidly Worm of Spindleston Heugh. Typically, a Northumbrian worm legend focuses upon a knight who returns home from a foreign war to defeat one of these creatures.

=== Sport ===
Football is a popular sport in the region, with three teams: Newcastle United, Sunderland and Middlesbrough. Other top tier sports teams that represent the region include: Newcastle Red Bulls (Rugby Union Premiership), Durham Cricket (County Cricket Championship), Newcastle Eagles (Super League Basketball).

== Politics ==
A number of fringe movements have sought to restore Northumbria as a geopolitical entity, either as a devolved region within a larger nation or as an independent state. These endeavours typically draw inspiration from the larger historical Kingdom of Northumbria rather than the Earldom that emerged during the late middle ages.

On 30 September 2014, as chairman of The Campaign for the North, Harold Elletson launched an all-party pressure group to re-create the ancient Kingdom of Northumbria as a federal state in a new United Kingdom. The Campaign sought 'devo-max' power from Westminster to bring the traditional counties of Northumberland, Durham, Yorkshire, Lancashire, Westmorland and Cumberland into a democratic state with powers equal to Scotland, Wales, Northern Ireland or London, retaining membership of the European Union. In 2015, he co-founded the Northern Party to campaign for better representation for Northern England. At the 2015 general election, he contested the constituency of Lancaster and Fleetwood, coming last with 0.4% of the vote. At the 2019 general election, he endorsed the incumbent Labour MP, Cat Smith.

The Northern Independence Party (NIP) is a secessionist political party which seeks to make Northern England an independent state under the name Northumbria. This proposed state would encompass the entirety of Northern England based upon the full extent of the Kingdom of Northumbria; minus its modern day Scottish regions, and not only the modern region. The party applied to stand in the 2021 Hartlepool by-election, but because its Electoral Commission registration was pending, its candidate, former Labour MP Thelma Walker, stood as an independent. She lost her deposit with 250 votes, but scored more than the 163 received by North East Party candidate, former Labour MP Hilton Dawson.

== Historical and genetic origins ==
Northumberland and County Durham, together with the Scottish Borders, are conterminous with the ancient British tribal kingdom of Bernicia (Bryneich) which is notable for the stable ancestry of its present indigenous population. The people of the region have been identified by DNA analysis to be strongly related to the genetic clusters of the Scottish Lowlands, Cumbria and Northern Ireland, who share a common line of descent. Linguistically, the Northumbrian dialect is closely related to Scots and other traditional Northern English dialects which share a common origin in Northumbrian Middle English.

== Biodiversity ==
The region has a diverse landscape that includes maritime cliffs and extensive moorland that contains a number of rare species of flora and fauna. Of particular importance are the saltmarshes of Lindisfarne, the Tees Estuary, the heaths, bogs and traditional upland hay meadows of the North Pennines, and the Arctic-alpine flora of Upper Teesdale.

The beauty of the Northumbrian coastline has led to its designation as an area of outstanding natural beauty (AONB) stretching 100 miles from Berwick-Upon-Tweed to the River Coquet estuary. Among the 290 bird species identified on the Farne Islands, is the rare seabird the roseate tern. One of the foremost bird sanctuaries and observatory for migratory and wading birds in the UK is now operated at "Saltholme" which is part of a wider site of special scientific interest called Seal Sands. The Saltholme reserve is managed by the Royal Society for the Protection of Birds(RSPB). This project has been pronounced as one of the best places to view birds by Bill Oddie, the celebrity bird watcher and former host of the BBC's Spring Watch Programme. In December 2012 he also presented the project with a prize as the UK's favorite National Lottery funded project. The seal colony at Seal Sands on the mouth of the River Tees is thriving and stands at more than 60 harbour seals and this is the only breeding colony of this species on the northeast coast. "Rainton Meadows" is also a recently created bird-watching site. The region is also the English stronghold of black grouse and contains 80–90% of the UK population of yellow marsh saxifrage.

The Magnesian Limestone grasslands of East Durham are a unique habitat not found anywhere else in the world which is particularly important to many species of butterfly and moths.

The Northeast of England also features woodland such as Kielder Forest, the largest man-made forest in Europe. This is located within Northumberland National Park and contains an important habitat for the endangered red squirrel.
