= Campaign for the North =

English devolution think tank

Campaign for the North was a think tank which sought to address the North–South divide and establish a Regional Government for the North of England covering the six historic counties of the region. The Campaign promoted a devo-max settlement and, in doing so, aimed to create a Northern Government with tax-raising powers and responsibility for policy areas including economic development, education, health, policing and emergency services.

== Goals of the Campaign ==
- A Northern Government and a directly elected Parliament for the North of England
- A major reform of local government – removing a layer of administration
- Constitutional reform and a new House of Lords more representative of the regions
- The merger of the North's 11 police forces into a single Police Service of Northern England
- A ‘whole system’ approach to health, social care and welfare
- Investment in education and the guarantee of a ‘fair deal’ for young people
- The creation of a ‘Bank of the North’, partly inspired by the German Landesbank regional banking system.
- A 10-year transport plan for the North, with electrification and new trains
- Sustainability at the heart of Government and more support for the North's environment

The Campaign was chaired by Dr Harold Elletson, former MP for Blackpool North between 1992 and 1997.

== See also ==
- Devolution to the North of England, the broad term used to describe the wish for devolved governmental powers that would give more autonomy to the Northern Counties.
- Mersey Barrage, a proposed scheme for building a tidal barrage across the Mersey Estuary.
- North East Party. A regionalist political party in North East England co-founded in 2014 by former Labour MP Hilton Dawson. The party campaigns for a better deal for North East England generally and is committed to a devolved assembly in the North East with powers similar to those in Wales, Scotland and Northern Ireland, if approved by a referendum.
- Northern Hub, a rail upgrade programme between 2009 and 2020 in Northern England to improve and increase train services and reduce journey times between its major cities and towns, by electrifying lines and removing a major rail bottleneck in Manchester.
- Northern Independence Party. A secessionist and democratic socialist political party that seeks to make Northern England an independent nation, under the name of Northumbria. Founded in October 2020 by lecturer and former Labour activist Philip Proudfoot, the party currently has no elected representatives.
- Northern Party. This British political party, formed by key members of the think tank, campaigned for the transfer of power from Westminster to the north of England. It registered as a political party in 2015 and deregistered the following year.
- Northern Powerhouse Rail, a proposed major rail programme designed to substantially enhance the economic potential of the North of England.
- Northern Powerhouse, a proposal to boost economic growth in the North of England.
- North–South divide in England, the cultural, economic, and social differences between Southern England and Northern England.
- Transpennine Route Upgrade, a major investment being made in the railway between York and Manchester via Leeds and Huddersfield – the 76 miles (122 km) northern route over the Pennines, most of which is also known as the Huddersfield line
- Yorkshire Party. A regionalist political party in Yorkshire, a historic county of England. Founded in 2014, it campaigns for the establishment of a devolved Yorkshire Assembly within the UK, with powers over education, environment, transport and housing.
