= 2022 Wirral Metropolitan Borough Council election =

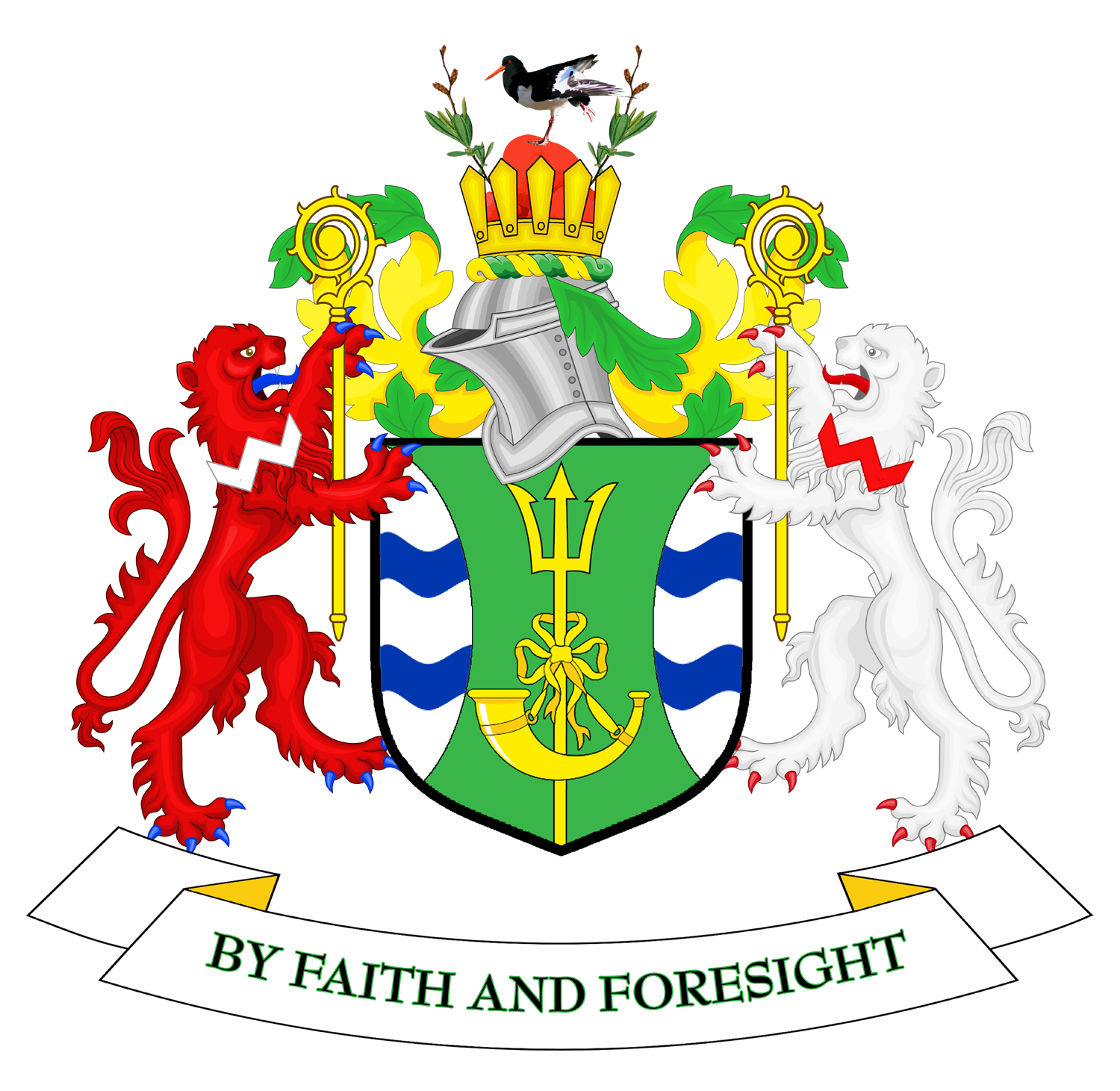
- 5 May 2022

23 of 66 seats (One Third and one by-election) to Wirral Metropolitan Borough Council 34 seats needed for a majority
- Turnout: 35.5% (▼0.5%)
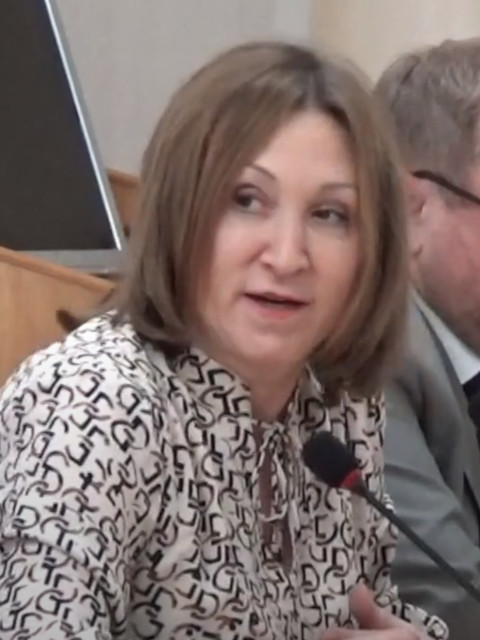

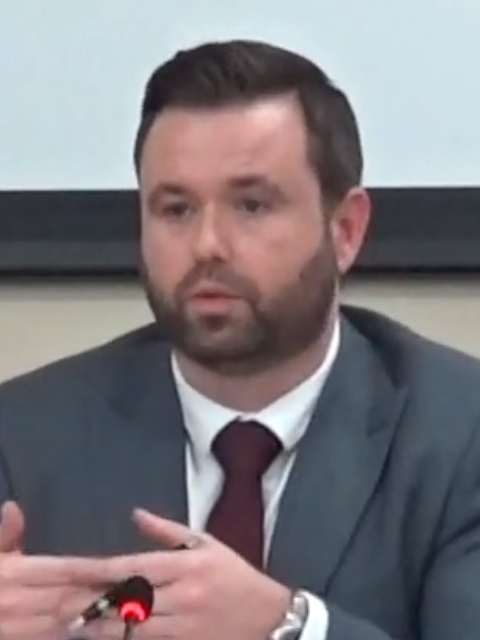

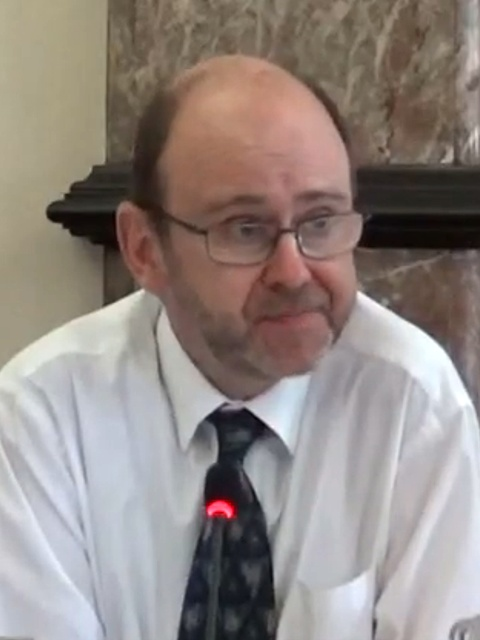

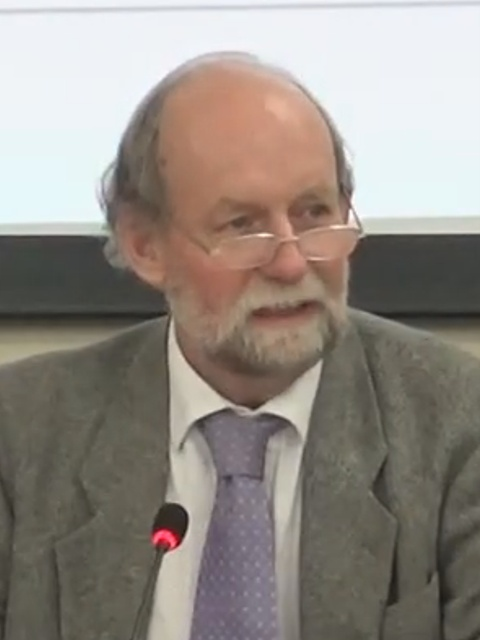
	First party	Second party
Leader	Janette Williamson	Tom Anderson
Party	Labour	Conservative
Leader since	29 June 2020	14 May 2021
Leader's seat	Liscard	Greasby; Frankby and Irby
Last election	10 seats, 39.7%	8 seats, 33.3%
Seats before	28	23
Seats won	9	8
Seats after	26	24
Seat change	▼2	▲1
Popular vote	36,642	22,499
Percentage	42.7%	26.2%
Swing	▲3.0%	▼7.1%
	Third party	Fourth party
Leader	Pat Cleary	Phil Gilchrist
Party	Green	Liberal Democrats
Leader since	22 May 2014	16 May 2013
Leader's seat	Birkenhead and Tranmere	Eastham
Last election	3 seats, 16.0%	2 seats, 10.1%
Seats before	6	6
Seats won	4	2
Seats after	9	6
Seat change	▲3	Steady
Popular vote	14,955	10,814
Percentage	17.4%	12.6%
Swing	▲1.4%	▲2.5%
- Map of results of 2022 election
Leader of the Council before election
Janette Williamson (Labour)
No Overall Control
Elected Leader of the Council
Janette Williamson (Labour)
No Overall Control

The 2022 Wirral Metropolitan Borough Council election took place on 5 May 2022 to elect members of Wirral Metropolitan Borough Council in England. This is expected to be the last election to the council where a third of councillors are elected, following recommendations from a government report into the Council's finances.

== Election results ==
=== Overall election result ===
Overall result compared with 2021.

Wirral Metropolitan Borough Council election result, 2022
Party	Candidates						Votes		
Party	Stood	Elected	Gained	Unseated	Net	% of total	%	No.	Net %
Labour	23	9	1	3	▼2	40.9	42.7	36,642	▲3.0
Conservative	23	8	1	0	▲1	36.4	26.2	22,499	▼7.1
Green	23	4	3	0	▲3	13.6	17.4	14,955	▲1.4
Liberal Democrats	23	2	0	0	Steady	9.1	12.6	10,814	▲2.5
Independent	2	0	0	2	▼2	0.0	0.9	758	▲0.3
NIP	1	0	0	0	Steady	0.0	0.1	89	New
For Britain	1	0	0	0	Steady	0.0	0.1	51	Steady
UKIP	1	0	0	0	Steady	0.0	0.0	38	New

(Note: % of total refers to % of wards won.)

=== Changes in council composition ===
Prior to the election the composition of the council was:

↓
28	23	6	6	3
Lab	Con	Grn	LDm	I

After the election the composition of the council was:

↓
26	24	9	6	1
Lab	Con	Grn	LDm	I

== Retiring councillors ==
Ward	Departing Councillor	Party	Ref.
Bebington	Tony Cottier	Labour	
Birkenhead and Tranmere	Steve Hayes	Independent (vacated seat on 22 March 2022)	
Bromborough	Irene Williams	Labour	
Greasby, Frankby and Irby	Wendy Clements	Conservative	
Heswall	Les Rowlands	Conservative	
Leasowe and Moreton East	Sharon Jones	Labour (vacated seat on 13 February 2022)	
Moreton West and Saughall Massie	Bruce Berry	Conservative	
New Brighton	Christine Spriggs	Labour	
Pensby and Thingwall	Kate Cannon	Labour	
Prenton	Samantha Frost	Labour	
Rock Ferry	Moira McLaughlin	Independent	
Seacombe	Adrian Jones	Labour	
Upton	Stuart Whittingham	Labour	

== Ward results ==
Results compared directly with the last local election in 2021.

=== Bebington ===
Bebington
Party	Candidate	Votes	%	±%
Green	Judith Grier	2,855	53.1	▼6.7
Labour	Brenda Ashton	1,876	34.9	▲5.9
Conservative	Nicola Oakley	559	10.4	▲0.4
Liberal Democrats	Robert Thompson	89	1.7	▲0.5
Majority		979	18.2	▼12.6
Registered electors		11,798		
Turnout		5,397	45.7	▲0.5
Rejected ballots		18	0.3	▼0.7
Green gain from Labour		Swing	▼6.3	

=== Bidston and St James ===
Bidston and St James
Party	Candidate	Votes	%	±%
Labour	Liz Grey	1,648	73.4	▲3.8
Conservative	Tina McDonnell	276	12.3	▼3.7
Green	Jayne Clough	220	9.8	▲0.8
Liberal Democrats	Mike Parson	102	4.5	▼0.9
Majority		1,372	61.1	▲7.5
Registered electors		10,468		
Turnout		2,246	21.6	▼0.4
Rejected ballots		10	0.4	▼1.2
Labour hold		Swing	▲3.8	

=== Birkenhead and Tranmere ===
Birkenhead and Tranmere (2)
Party	Candidate	Votes	%	±%
Green	Pat Cleary	1,798	59.8	▼0.1
Green	Amanda Onwuemene	1,484	–	–
Labour	Paul Jobson	1,045	34.8	▲3.3
Labour	Tony Murphy	743	–	–
Conservative	Mike Clements	86	2.9	▼2.5
Liberal Democrats	Ross Campbell	78	2.6	▲1.4
Conservative	Colin Young	70	–	–
Liberal Democrats	Edward Smith	26	–	–
Majority		753	25.0	▼5.5
Registered electors		10,337		
Turnout		2,816	27.2	▼0.6
Rejected ballots		7	0.2	▼1.0
Green hold		Swing	▼2.7	
Green gain from Independent		Swing	–	

=== Bromborough ===
Bromborough
Party	Candidate	Votes	%	±%
Labour	Sue Percy	1,866	52.5	▼8.6
Green	Edward Lamb	726	20.4	▲11.8
Conservative	Graham Davies	608	17.1	▼5.2
Liberal Democrats	Vicky Downie	357	10.0	▲2.0
Majority		1,140	32.0	▼6.8
Registered electors		12,122		
Turnout		3,557	29.5	▼0.9
Rejected ballots		19	0.5	▼0.6
Labour hold		Swing	▼3.4	

=== Clatterbridge ===
Clatterbridge
Party	Candidate	Votes	%	±%
Conservative	Mary Jordan	1,967	43.1	▼8.7
Labour Co-op	Thomas Laing	1,521	33.3	▲2.7
Liberal Democrats	Christopher Raymond	542	11.9	▲4.2
Green	Jim McGinley	532	11.7	▲1.7
Majority		446	9.8	▼11.4
Registered electors		11,202		
Turnout		4,562	40.9	▼0.7
Rejected ballots		16	0.3	▼0.6
Conservative hold		Swing	▼5.7	

=== Claughton ===
Claughton
Party	Candidate	Votes	%	±%
Labour Co-op	Gillian Wood	1,984	59.6	▼0.6
Conservative	Andy Hodson	598	18.0	▲0.5
Green	Liz Heydon	414	12.4	▲0.6
Liberal Democrats	David Evans	275	8.3	▼0.7
For Britain	Gary Bergin	57	1.7	▼0.2
Majority		1,386	41.6	▼1.1
Registered electors		11,336		
Turnout		3,328	29.5	▼1.3
Rejected ballots		14	0.4	▼1.1
Labour hold		Swing	▼0.6	

=== Eastham ===
Eastham
Party	Candidate	Votes	%	±%
Liberal Democrats	Christopher Carubia	2,201	56.6	▼6.6
Labour	Nicole Williams	1,032	26.5	▲6.4
Conservative	Denise Crossley-Williams	416	10.7	▼1.7
Green	Percy Hogg	239	6.1	▲1.8
Majority		1,169	30.1	▼13.1
Registered electors		11,033		
Turnout		3,888	35.3	▼0.6
Rejected ballots		9	0.2	▼0.4
Liberal Democrats hold		Swing	▼0.4	

=== Greasby, Frankby and Irby ===
Greasby, Frankby and Irby
Party	Candidate	Votes	%	±%
Conservative	Tracy Elzeiny	2,206	42.9	▼11.4
Labour	Gail Jenkinson	2,142	41.7	▲10.5
Green	Cathy Page	418	8.1	▼0.3
Liberal Democrats	Michael Redfern	374	7.3	▲1.3
Majority		64	1.2	▼21.9
Registered electors		11,462		
Turnout		5,140	45.0	▲0.8
Rejected ballots		22	0.4	▼0.5
Conservative hold		Swing	▼11.0	

=== Heswall ===
Heswall
Party	Candidate	Votes	%	±%
Conservative	Paul Connolly	1,999	40.6	▼15.5
Liberal Democrats	Lucy Johnson	1,700	34.6	▲23.8
Labour	Ann Ainsworth	897	18.2	▼4.3
Green	Barbara Burton	322	6.5	▼2.9
Majority		299	6.1	▼27.5
Registered electors		10,838		
Turnout		4,918	45.6	▼0.5
Rejected ballots		22	0.4	▼0.7
Conservative hold		Swing	▼13.8	

=== Hoylake and Meols ===
Hoylake and Meols
Party	Candidate	Votes	%	±%
Conservative	Tony Cox	1,981	42.2	▼10.5
Labour	David Sindall	1,577	33.6	▲4.7
Green	Alix Cockcroft	484	10.3	▼1.1
Independent	John Ellis	329	7.0	New
Liberal Democrats	Peter Reisdorf	326	6.9	▼0.1
Majority		404	8.6	▼15.1
Registered electors		10,521		
Turnout		4,697	44.8	▼1.1
Rejected ballots		18	0.4	▼0.5
Conservative hold		Swing	▼15.1	

=== Leasowe and Moreton East ===
Leasowe and Moreton East
Party	Candidate	Votes	%	±%
Labour	Angie Davies	2,112	65.1	▲11.0
Conservative	Debbie Caplin	805	24.8	▼14.4
Green	Hannah Rapley	177	5.5	▲0.6
Liberal Democrats	Chase Newton	150	4.6	▲2.8
Majority		1,307	40.3	▲25.4
Registered electors		10,969		
Turnout		3,244	29.7	▼3.0
Rejected ballots		11	0.3	▼0.8
Labour hold		Swing	▲12.7	

=== Liscard ===
Liscard
Party	Candidate	Votes	%	±%
Labour	Janette Williamson	2,101	64.8	▲7.9
Conservative	Jane Owens	643	19.8	▼6.4
Green	Perle Sheldricks	334	10.3	▲2.2
Liberal Democrats	Francis Doyle	164	5.1	▼1.5
Majority		1,458	45.0	▲14.3
Registered electors		11,245		
Turnout		3,242	29.0	▼0.6
Rejected ballots		18	0.6	▼0.6
Labour hold		Swing	▲7.2	

=== Moreton West and Saughall Massie ===
Moreton West and Saughall Massie
Party	Candidate	Votes	%	±%
Conservative	Vida Wilson	1,812	48.4	▼7.8
Labour	James Laing	1,453	38.8	▲5.2
Green	Hilary Cullen	313	8.4	▲1.9
Liberal Democrats	Christopher Teggin	167	4.5	▲2.5
Majority		359	9.6	▼13.0
Registered electors		10,599		
Turnout		3,745	35.5	▼1.5
Rejected ballots		15	0.4	▼0.9
Conservative hold		Swing	▼6.5	

=== New Brighton ===
New Brighton
Party	Candidate	Votes	%	±%
Labour	Sue Powell-Wilde	2,317	60.7	▲7.5
Conservative	Darren May	757	19.8	▼9.9
Green	Cynthia Stonall	518	13.6	▲1.7
Liberal Democrats	Adam Keenan	225	5.9	▲0.7
Majority		1,560	40.9	▲17.4
Registered electors		11,400		
Turnout		3,817	33.6	▼1.4
Rejected ballots		18	0.5	▲0.1
Labour hold		Swing	▲8.7	

=== Oxton ===
Oxton
Party	Candidate	Votes	%	±%
Liberal Democrats	Allan Brame	2,513	64.2	▲7.2
Labour Co-op	Susan Mahoney	916	23.4	▼2.5
Green	Rachel Heydon	234	6.0	▼1.5
Conservative	Philip Merry	216	5.5	▼2.6
UKIP	Philip Griffiths	38	1.0	New
Majority		1,597	40.8	▲9.7
Registered electors		10,879		
Turnout		3,917	36.1	▼1.1
Rejected ballots		12	0.3	▼0.8
Liberal Democrats hold		Swing	▲4.9	

=== Pensby and Thingwall ===
Pensby and Thingwall
Party	Candidate	Votes	%	±%
Conservative	Leah Fraser	1,787	40.5	▼7.9
Labour	Finlay Gordon	1,755	39.7	▲3.4
Green	Allen Burton	491	11.1	▲1.3
Liberal Democrats	Phil Waterfield	383	8.7	▲3.1
Majority		32	0.7	▼11.4
Registered electors		10,505		
Turnout		4,416	42.2	▼2.3
Rejected ballots		22	0.5	▼0.5
Conservative gain from Labour		Swing	▼5.7	

=== Prenton ===
Prenton
Party	Candidate	Votes	%	±%
Green	Naomi Graham	2,087	52.8	▼1.7
Labour	Julienne McGeough	1,520	38.5	▲3.3
Conservative	William Harland	250	6.3	▼1.9
Liberal Democrats	David Tyrrell	92	2.3	▲0.2
Majority		567	14.4	▼5.0
Registered electors		10,850		
Turnout		3,967	36.6	▼1.0
Rejected ballots		18	0.5	▼0.3
Green gain from Labour		Swing	▼2.5	

=== Rock Ferry ===
Rock Ferry
Party	Candidate	Votes	%	±%
Labour	Chris Davies	1,579	60.6	▲4.9
Independent	Stephen Davies	429	16.5	▼3.5
Green	Craig McDonald	292	11.2	▲1.3
Conservative	Simon Mendies	208	8.0	▼2.8
Liberal Democrats	Tom Sutton	98	3.8	▲0.3
Majority		1,150	44.1	▲8.4
Registered electors		10,230		
Turnout		2,606	25.6	▼1.4
Rejected ballots		9	0.3	▼1.5
Labour gain from Independent		Swing	▲4.2	

=== Seacombe ===
Seacombe
Party	Candidate	Votes	%	±%
Labour	John Hoey	1,669	53.9	▼15.7
Green	Rae Voller	1,218	39.3	▲30.2
Conservative	Bobby Cartwright	116	5.4	▼12.3
Liberal Democrats	Anthony Morris	46	1.5	▼2.1
Majority		451	14.6	▼37.4
Registered electors		10,227		
Turnout		3,099	30	▲7.9
Rejected ballots		13	0.4	▼0.8
Labour hold		Swing	▼18.7	

=== Upton ===
Upton
Party	Candidate	Votes	%	±%
Labour	Stephen Bennett	2,137	59.6	▲4.4
Conservative	David Fairbairn	818	22.8	▼5.8
Green	Lily Clough	437	12.2	Steady
Liberal Democrats	Alan Davies	195	5.4	▲1.4
Majority		1,319	36.8	▲10.3
Registered electors		12,316		
Turnout		3,587	29.3	▲0.4
Rejected ballots		27	0.7	▼0.3
Labour hold		Swing	▲5.1	

=== Wallasey ===
Wallasey
Party	Candidate	Votes	%	±%
Conservative	Lesley Rennie	2,307	45.6	▼4.2
Labour	Andrew Bennett	2,198	43.4	▲2.0
Green	Moira Gommon	292	5.8	Steady
Liberal Democrats	John Codling	265	5.2	▲2.1
Majority		109	2.2	▼6.2
Registered electors		11,565		
Turnout		5,062	43.8	▼0.6
Rejected ballots		9	0.2	▼0.8
Conservative hold		Swing	▼3.1	

=== West Kirby and Thurstaston ===
West Kirby and Thurstaston
Party	Candidate	Votes	%	±%
Conservative	Jeff Green	2,034	45.7	▼11.0
Labour Co-op	Louise Reecejones	1,297	29.2	▲2.9
Green	Yvonne McGinley	554	12.5	▲0.3
Liberal Democrats	John Mullins	472	10.6	▲5.8
NIP	Lawrence Monk	89	2.0	New
Majority		737	16.6	▼13.8
Registered electors		10,234		
Turnout		4,446	43.8	▼1.8
Rejected ballots		35	0.8	Steady
Conservative hold		Swing	▼7.0	

== Changes between 2022 and 2023 ==
=== Liscard by-election 2022 ===
Cllr David Brennan, first elected in 2021, announced his resignation on 2 June 2022. A by-election was held on 14 July.

By-election, 14 July 2022: Liscard
Party	Candidate	Votes	%	±%
Labour	James Laing	1,304	64.8	Steady
Conservative	Jane Owens	370	18.4	▼1.4
Green	Nadia Parsons	172	8.5	▼1.8
Liberal Democrats	Sue Arrowsmith	167	8.3	▲3.2
Majority		934	46.4	▲1.4
Registered electors		10,795		
Turnout		2,027	18.8	▼10.8
Rejected ballots		14	0.7	▲0.1
Labour hold		Swing	▲0.7	

== Notes ==
• italics denote the sitting councillor • bold denotes the winning candidate
