= Devolution to the North of England =

British political process and ideology

King Oswald's Banner, used to represent the greater region and former kingdom of Northumbria.

Northern England as defined along Historic Counties

Northern England devolution is the broad term used to describe the wish for devolved governmental powers that would give more autonomy to the counties of Northern England (the northern parts of the North–South divide in England).

Whilst definitions of the North vary, it is commonly defined as the border with Scotland in the north, to the Midlands, or near the River Trent, in the south. This is currently defined by three governmental statistical regions: North West England, Yorkshire and the Humber, and North East England.

== History ==
Prior to the unification of England in the 10th century, Northern England had broadly constituted the Kingdom of Northumbria, deriving from the Old English Norþan-hymbre meaning "the people or province north of the Humber".

One of the first bodies formed in modern times to address local autonomy issues and grievances was the "Council of the North" formed in 1988. This was in response to the North's concern with the taking over of York-based Rowntree by the Swiss firm, Nestlé. The original Council of the North had last met in the 17th century to deal with the chaos of the English Civil War. The council met, and while it was attended by noted businessmen and politicians, little came of it and the movement soon petered out.

The more recent push for Scottish independence has had its effect on the North of England, with the 2004 North East England devolution referendum held in order to decide whether to establish a parliament for the North. This has partly been spurred on by the feeling that London and the south are culturally different to the North, with some commentary stating that the "real" English are seen as the South. There are also concerns that if Scotland was to become independent, then economic factors associated with this would negatively affect the North, with industry/investment going to Scotland with possible tax breaks. Establishing a separate country or autonomous region is seen by some as a way to stop this. Alternatively, a potential more successful focussed economic hub based around Scotland could benefit the North of England, as their population centre is closer to it than to London. To some, the differences between London and Scotland are similar to the differences between London and the North of England.

Economically, North Eastern Businesses have called for greater control over the region's financial affairs. However, despite these sentiments, the 2004 referendum for more autonomy was convincingly rejected, with a voter turnout of 45%. 2015 saw a petition for part of the North to secede and join Scotland gain 28,000 signatures.

== Contemporary movement ==
The Northern England government regions (North East England, North West England and Yorkshire and the Humber) in England.

In 2014, the people within the North of England indicated in a survey by the BBC that there was a greater wish for devolution of some powers at least. The survey indicated that 85% of people in the North wanted control of policing, taxation and education handed over to the region. There is also a perceived continuing widening of the North-South divide, which continues to highlight the issue to people living in the North. Government policy relating to the COVID-19 pandemic also created tension between the North and the UK Government, which gave rise to some discussion of a separate region as a way of giving more say to the area.

Various parties have been formed to test the issues in elections, including the North East Party in 2014 and the Northern Party in 2015. The Yorkshire Party looks specifically at the issue of a devolved assembly for Yorkshire.

Smaller movements exist in Liverpool and Doncaster.

The sonoric landscape of spoken Scouse extends beyond contemporary political and geographic boundaries of the City of Liverpool and instead extends to Merseyside as a whole. An estimated three-quarters of Liverpudlians have Irish ancestry, causing some to identify more strongly as Scouse or Irish than English. In 1885, the historic constituency Liverpool Scotland elected an Irish Nationalist, T. P. O'Connor, as their MP, and 59% voted remain in the 2016 EU referendum. #ScouseNotEnglish trended on Twitter following the result of the 2019 general election as Merseyside constituencies had some of the highest Labour vote shares in the country. The phrase "Scouse not English" resonates strongly in Liverpool, reflecting a unique identity and heritage that has fuelled a growing debate on the possibility of the city achieving independence from the rest of England. This divisive discourse, influenced by historical sentiments and contemporary political differences, has gained traction on social media, prompting discussions on whether Liverpool should pursue autonomy through a referendum.

"Liverpool has historically perceived itself as distinct from the rest of the country, sharing more similarities with Belfast and Glasgow than with London. With a significant Irish influx and its status as a port city, Liverpool has maintained international ties, looking towards America and Ireland rather than London." The "Make Liverpool/Merseyside an independent state which remains in the EU" petition was submitted on 28 February 2017 during the 2015–2017 Conservative government. The petition aimed to advocate for the independence of Merseyside and its desire to remain in the European Union following the Brexit referendum, however, was rejected by the UK Government and Parliament.

Thirty years ago, amidst economic decline and political discontent, left-wing factions in Liverpool sought to break away from the UK, driven by opposition to Margaret Thatcher's policies. Fuelled by economic struggles—Liverpool lost 80,000 jobs between 1972 and 1982—the city's Labour council, led by the Militant Tendency, embarked on radical socialist initiatives. Despite a brief infusion of funds from the government, the council's request for continued support was denied, intensifying the city's sense of alienation. The episode, marked by political turbulence and anti-Militant sentiment, serves as a historical backdrop to contemporary discussions on regional autonomy within the UK.

Beginning close to the time of the 2014 Scottish independence referendum, it became a topic of discussion across British news outlets that Doncaster has a claim to belonging to Scotland as opposed to England, by technicality. This originates from the 1136 and 1139 Treaties of Durham, in which David I of Scotland and his son Henry were granted the Lordship of Doncaster by Stephen of England to dissuade David from invading England. Historians observed that no known agreement in writing ever returned to Doncaster to England, unlike other territory offered from the north by Stephen, which is more commonly documented as being returned as a condition of the 1157 Treaty of Chester. Despite Scotland remaining in the United Kingdom after the 2014 referendum did not win a majority vote, the claim popularised the idea of Doncaster joining Scotland in the future event of independence to the extent that on 8th October 2020, and again on 29th March 2022, petitions were submitted to the UK Parliament petitions website titled "Affirm that Doncaster is legally part of Scotland" and "Honour Scotland's claim on Doncaster by giving them power over Doncaster". In response to both on their respective webpages, Parliament confirmed that in the event of another Scottish independence referendum, the UK Government would allow Doncaster a local referendum on leaving the United Kingdom to join the new independent Scotland as an exclave if it was demanded by petition first, provided that an independent Scotland consented to taking the city's territory on top of a majority "Yes" vote. It was only not specified whether this would be applied to Doncaster itself, or all of the wider Metropolitan Borough of Doncaster, covering separate towns such as Dunscroft/Hatfield and Mexborough. Just eight months after the second petition was submitted, the borough acquired city status.

In 2020 a new party, the Northern Independence Party (NIP) was formed on making the North of England independent of the South, much like the SNP seeks an independent Scotland. The NIP was formed in order to contest the 2024 general election, its goal being to establish an independent country in the North of England, based on historic Northumbria. While the NIP have nominated York as a proposed capital of an independent Northern England, Manchester and Liverpool have also been raised as options.

=== Regional devolution ===
As well as devolution to the North of England as a whole, there have also been proposals for devolution to regions within the North. When Boris Johnson became Prime Minister in 2019, he promised to devolve powers in the north while in office. Specifically to devolve powers in Hull, Manchester, Liverpool, Leeds, Sheffield and Newcastle as part of the Northern Powerhouse.

==== Yorkshire ====
Historic extent (left) and modern definition (right) of Yorkshire

Due both to its size and regional identity, there has existed a Yorkshire Devolution movement, promoting a regionalist form of government for Yorkshire. In 2014, the Yorkshire First Party, later rebranded as the Yorkshire Party, was founded. In recent years, some devolved institutions have been set up in parts of Yorkshire, but none exist across the whole region.

Currently South Yorkshire, West Yorkshire and North Yorkshire have devolved Combined Authorities, with the Sheffield City Region and West Yorkshire Combined Authorities set up in 2014, as well as the Tees Valley Combined Authority covering parts of North Yorkshire. There has also been a campaign for a single "One Yorkshire" Combined Authority and elected Mayor, covering the entirety of Yorkshire. This was supported eighteen of the twenty two Yorkshire local authorities, as well as Dan Jarvis, Mayor of the Sheffield City Region; Sheffield and Rotherham councils preferred the South Yorkshire alternative, whilst several North Yorkshire councils were already part of the Tees Valley Combined Authority. A proposal was submitted to the government in March 2018, but was rejected by the government in February 2019. Subsequent to the rejection of the One Yorkshire Combined Authority, despite support continuing for it, new proposals have been made for an East Yorkshire and Combined Authority.

==== North East England ====
Historic Northumberland and County Durham (left) and modern North East England (right)

North East England was offered a referendum on devolution in 2004, however, voters rejected the proposal by a margin of 77.9% to 22.1%, on a turnout of 48%. More recently, the issue of North East devolution has resurfaced with the establishment of the North East Party in 2014. The party, which is commonly viewed as a sister party of the Yorkshire party, campaigns for a devolved regional government in the North East with powers comparable to those of the nations of Scotland, Wales and Northern Ireland and has gained four elected councillors on Durham County Council.

A 2025 YouGov survey found that 48% of people in the North East reported a "very strong" attachment to their region—the highest of any English region and comparable to levels of national attachment in Wales (49%).

== See also ==
- English devolution
- Federalism in the United Kingdom
- North East Party
- Northern Independence Party
