= Philip Proudfoot =

English political activist and anthropologist (born 1987)

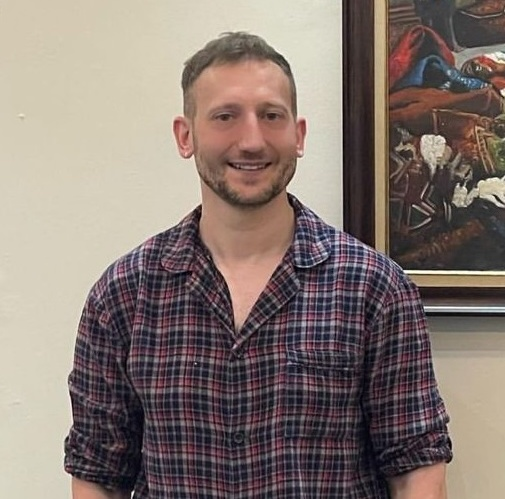
- Proudfoot in 2023

Leader of the Northern Independence Party
- In office 21 October 2020 – 22 July 2022

Personal details
- Born: 28 November 1987 (age 38) County Durham, England
- Party: Green Party of England and Wales (2023–present)
- Other political affiliations: Northern Independence Party (2020–2023); Labour (until 2020)
- Education: London School of Economics (PhD)
- Occupation: University lecturer
- Profession: Academic

Philip Proudfoot (born 28 November 1987) is an English political activist and anthropologist. He is the founder of the Northern Independence Party (NIP), a minor political party which advocates that Northern England become an independent country. He also lectures at the University of Sussex.

A former member of the Labour Party, Proudfoot founded the NIP in October 2020 in response to dissatisfaction with the "reversion to Blairism" under Keir Starmer's leadership. He told Big Issue North that the centralisation of power in London had also played a part.

On 25 April 2022, the actress Tracy-Ann Oberman said that she had agreed to pay Proudfoot substantial damages after falsely accusing him of antisemitism.

Proudfoot stepped down as leader of the NIP in July 2022 due to "professional commitments". On 19 November 2023, he announced that he had joined the Green Party, citing its support for a ceasefire in Gaza, among other policies.

== Books ==
- Rebel Populism: Revolution and Loss Among Syrian Labourers in Beirut. Manchester University Press. 2022. ISBN 978-1-5261-5810-9. OCLC 1276933129.
