= 2022 Sheffield City Council election =

Local election in England

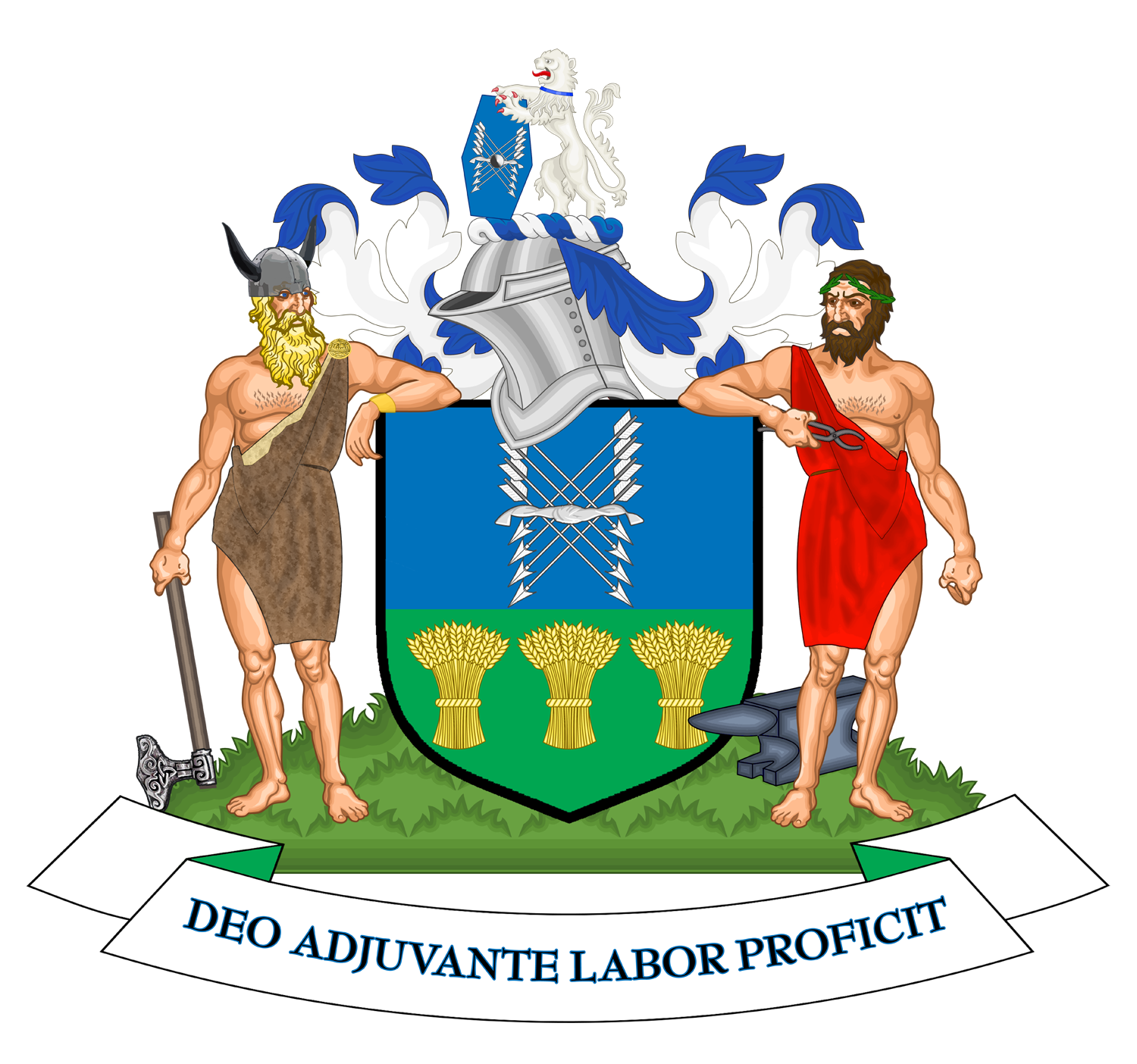
- 5 May 2022

One third of seats (28 of 84) to Sheffield City Council 43 seats needed for a majority

	First party	Second party
Leader	Terry Fox	Shaffaq Mohammed
Party	Labour	Liberal Democrats
Seats won	15	9
Seat change	▼1	0
Popular vote	52,175	28,031
Percentage	40.6%	21.8%
Swing	▲4.0%	▲0.6%
	Third party	Fourth party
Leader	Douglas Johnson	Lewis Chinchen
Party	Green	Conservative
Seats won	4	0
Seat change	▲1	0
Popular vote	27,245	16,803
Percentage	21.2%	13.1%
Swing	▲0.8%	▼5.3%
- Results map by ward
Council control before election
No Overall Control (Lab/Grn coalition)
Council control after election
No Overall Control (Lab/Lib/Grn Committee System)

The 2022 Sheffield City Council election took place on 5 May 2022 to elect members of Sheffield City Council in England, as part of the nationwide local elections. One seat from each ward was up for election.

This was the first election held since the formation of a Labour-Green coalition in 2021, following the loss of Labour's overall majority on the council. Following the election, the council remains under No Overall Control.

== Overall election result ==
2022 Sheffield City Council election
Party	Seats	Gains	Losses	Net gain/loss	Seats %	Votes %	Votes	+/−
Labour	15	2	3	▼1	53.6	40.6	52,175	+4.0
Liberal Democrats	9	1	1	Steady	32.1	21.8	28,031	+0.6
Green	4	2	1	▲1	14.3	21.2	27,245	+0.8
Conservative	0	0	0	Steady	0.0	13.1	16,803	-5.3
TUSC	0	0	0	Steady	0.0	1.0	1,225	+0.4
Yorkshire	0	0	0	Steady	0.0	0.9	1,166	±0.0
Independent	0	0	0	Steady	0.0	0.4	509	-0.2
Reform	0	0	0	Steady	0.0	0.3	356	-0.4
Women's Equality	0	0	0	Steady	0.0	0.2	226	±0.0
SDP	0	0	0	Steady	0.0	0.2	225	+0.1
NIP	0	0	0	Steady	0.0	0.2	212	New
UKIP	0	0	0	Steady	0.0	0.1	122	-0.1
Communist	0	0	0	Steady	0.0	0.1	79	New

Party	Previous council	New council	+/-
Labour	40	39	▼1
Liberal Democrats	29	29	-
Green	13	14	▲1
Conservative	1	1	-
Independent	1	1	-
Total	84	84	
Working majority	-4	-6	

== Ward results ==
Incumbents are denoted by an asterisk (*). Turnout includes rejected ballots.

=== Beauchief & Greenhill ===
Beauchief & Greenhill
Party	Candidate	Votes	%	±%
Liberal Democrats	Simon Clement-Jones*	1,951	40.1	+6.7
Labour	Lisa Banes	1,769	36.4	+3.7
Conservative	Elizabeth Finney	579	11.9	−8.7
Green	Graham Marsden	565	11.6	−1.6
Majority		182	3.71	
Turnout		4,904	35.45	−1.38
Liberal Democrats hold		Swing		

=== Beighton ===
Beighton
Party	Candidate	Votes	%	±%
Liberal Democrats	Kurtis Crossland	1,582	39.2	+5.9
Labour	Julie Gledhill	1,498	37.1	+4.8
Conservative	Robert Prior	655	16.2	−8.9
Green	Anthony Naylor	298	7.4	−0.4
Majority		84	2.07	
Turnout		4,053	30.49	−1.74
Liberal Democrats gain from Labour		Swing		

=== Birley ===
Birley
Party	Candidate	Votes	%	±%
Labour	Karen McGowan*	1,783	56.4	+6.9
Conservative	Steven Winstone	603	19.1	−14.1
Yorkshire	Alex Martin	310	9.8	N/A
Green	Alan Yearsley	296	9.4	−2.3
Liberal Democrats	James Ellwood	170	5.4	−0.2
Majority		1,180	37.08	
Turnout		3,182	25.25	−4.14
Labour hold		Swing		

=== Broomhill & Sharrow Vale ===
Broomhill & Sharrow Vale
Party	Candidate	Votes	%	±%
Green	Maleiki Haybe	2,675	46.9	+3.4
Labour	Alison Norris	2,275	39.9	−2.3
Liberal Democrats	Tom Parkin	295	5.2	−0.1
Conservative	Gordon Gregory	293	5.1	−2.0
TUSC	Noah Eden	166	2.9	+1.1
Majority		400	6.96	
Turnout		5,745	32.90	+2.91
Green hold		Swing		

=== Burngreave ===
Burngreave
Party	Candidate	Votes	%	±%
Labour	Mark Jones*	2,750	71.0	+5.6
Green	Mustafa Ahmed	637	16.4	+5.6
Conservative	Seun Ajao	278	7.2	−3.3
Liberal Democrats	Christopher Lynch	210	5.4	+1.1
Majority		2,113	54.12	
Turnout		3,904	26.98	+0.01
Labour hold		Swing		

=== City ===
City
Party	Candidate	Votes	%	±%
Green	Martin Phipps*	1,160	55.4	+1.4
Labour	Gareth Slater	662	31.6	−3.4
Conservative	Andrew Smith	108	5.2	−2.2
Liberal Democrats	Julia Wright	84	4.0	+0.4
NIP	Adam Calvert	78	3.7	NA
Majority		498	23.66	
Turnout		2,105	16.15	−1.59
Green hold		Swing		

=== Crookes & Crosspool ===
Crookes & Crosspool
Party	Candidate	Votes	%	±%
Labour	Minesh Parekh	2,492	37.5	+0.2
Liberal Democrats	Mohammed Mahroof*	2,297	34.5	+1.6
Green	Josiah Luck	1,191	17.9	−1.2
Conservative	John Stansfield-Bay	468	7.0	−2.0
NIP	Nathan Howard	134	2.0	N/A
TUSC	Isabelle France	71	1.1	N/A
Majority		195	2.92	N/A
Turnout		6,680	44.76	−1.93
Labour gain from Liberal Democrats		Swing		

=== Darnall ===
Darnall
Party	Candidate	Votes	%	±%
Labour	Zahira Naz*	2,349	66.3	+14.5
Liberal Democrats	Adil Mohammed	428	12.1	−3.9
Conservative	Christopher Pitchfork	414	11.7	−4.0
Green	Eamonn Ward	214	6.0	+0.9
TUSC	Diane Spencer	140	3.9	+0.6
Majority		1,921	53.61	
Turnout		3,583	26.62	−0.42
Labour hold		Swing		

=== Dore & Totley ===
Dore & Totley
Party	Candidate	Votes	%	±%
Liberal Democrats	Martin Smith*	3,325	50.4	+2.5
Conservative	Sara Chinchen	1,301	19.7	−6.2
Labour	Leon Warsama	1,095	16.6	+2.8
Green	Gill Black	876	13.3	+0.9
Majority		2,024	30.54	
Turnout		6,628	44.99	−7.02
Liberal Democrats hold		Swing		

=== East Ecclesfield ===
East Ecclesfield
Party	Candidate	Votes	%	±%
Labour	Craig Gamble-Pugh	1,875	42.1	+11.5
Liberal Democrats	Kate Guest	1,517	34.0	+3.0
Conservative	Adam Allcroft	838	18.8	−9.0
Green	Ashley Routh	227	5.1	±0.0
Majority		358	7.98	
Turnout		4,487	32.41	−2.21
Labour hold		Swing		

=== Ecclesall ===
Ecclesall
Party	Candidate	Votes	%	±%
Liberal Democrats	Shaffaq Mohammed*	2,641	32.9	−1.2
Green	Peter Gilbert	2,271	28.3	+3.5
Labour	Jenny Prideaux	2,243	27.9	+2.4
Conservative	Gordon Millward	744	9.3	−3.0
Women's Equality	Christine Rose	131	1.6	−0.7
Majority		370	4.58	
Turnout		8,086	51.04	−2.80
Liberal Democrats hold		Swing		

=== Firth Park ===
Firth Park
Party	Candidate	Votes	%	±%
Labour	Abtisam Mohamed*	1,640	54.2	−2.5
Conservative	Steve Toone	445	14.7	−9.5
Liberal Democrats	Irshad Akbar	430	14.2	+9.6
SDP	April Worrall	225	7.4	+2.7
Green	Joydu Al-Mahfuz	193	6.4	−3.4
TUSC	Alexander Brown	92	3.0	N/A
Majority		1,195	38.75	
Turnout		3,084	21.84	−1.62
Labour hold		Swing		

=== Fulwood ===
Fulwood
Party	Candidate	Votes	%	±%
Liberal Democrats	Cliff Woodcraft*	2,689	41.7	−4.9
Labour	Matthew Killeya	1,955	30.3	+8.4
Green	Judith Rutnam	1,110	17.2	+0.2
Conservative	Christine Saunders	693	10.7	−3.8
Majority		734	11.32	
Turnout		6,486	46.10	−2.39
Liberal Democrats hold		Swing		

=== Gleadless Valley ===
Gleadless Valley
Party	Candidate	Votes	%	±%
Green	Marieanne Elliot	2,329	47.4	+1.4
Labour	Jackie Kennedy	1,824	37.1	+0.1
Conservative	Shirley Clayton	407	8.3	−2.3
Liberal Democrats	John Dryden	257	5.2	+0.7
TUSC	Rebecca Fryer	93	1.9	0.0
Majority		505	10.21	
Turnout		4,947	36.64	−2.43
Green gain from Labour		Swing		

=== Graves Park ===
Graves Park
Party	Candidate	Votes	%	±%
Liberal Democrats	Steve Ayris*	2,003	36.3	−2.8
Labour	Edd Mustill	1,913	34.7	+4.5
Green	Lucy Critchlow	1,151	20.9	+1.5
Conservative	Chris Garratt	447	8.1	−3.1
Majority		90	1.62	
Turnout		5,547	41.49	−3.42
Liberal Democrats hold		Swing		

=== Hillsborough ===
Hillsborough
Party	Candidate	Votes	%	±%
Green	Henry Nottage	2,364	45.1	+3.7
Labour	Josie Paszek*	2,022	38.6	+3.0
Conservative	Theresa Morrison	531	10.1	−5.9
Liberal Democrats	Will Sapwell	227	4.3	−1.3
TUSC	Joe Hibbert	100	1.9	+0.5
Majority		342	6.48	
Turnout		5,275	36.31	−2.21
Green gain from Labour		Swing		

=== Manor Castle ===
Manor Castle
Party	Candidate	Votes	%	±%
Labour	Terry Fox*	1,633	52.5	+3.9
Green	Ruth Flagg-Abbey	556	17.9	−2.0
Conservative	Ayodele Akinduko	372	12.0	−5.9
Yorkshire	Jack Carrington	307	9.9	+0.5
Liberal Democrats	Stephanie Kenning	148	4.8	+0.6
TUSC	Alistair Tice	95	3.1	−0.1
Majority		1,077	34.26	
Turnout		3,144	21.34	−0.98
Labour hold		Swing		

=== Mosborough ===
Mosborough
Party	Candidate	Votes	%	±%
Liberal Democrats	Gail Smith*	1,756	40.9	+5.4
Labour	Samantha Nicholson	1,630	38.0	−2.0
Conservative	Mark Finney	671	15.6	−2.6
Green	Julie White	235	5.5	+1.0
Majority		126	2.92	
Turnout		4,322	31.77	−4.20
Liberal Democrats hold		Swing		

=== Nether Edge & Sharrow ===
Nether Edge & Sharrow
Party	Candidate	Votes	%	±%
Labour	Nighat Basharat	3,165	47.6	+13.0
Green	Graham Wroe	2,632	39.6	−9.2
Liberal Democrats	Tariq Zaman	397	6.0	−0.1
Conservative	John Chapman	294	4.4	−4.3
TUSC	Holly Johnston	159	2.4	−0.6
Majority		533	7.95	
Turnout		6,708	42.79	+2.62
Labour gain from Green		Swing		

=== Park & Arbourthorne ===
Park & Arbourthorne
Party	Candidate	Votes	%	±%
Labour	Nabeela Mowlana	1,479	44.8	−4.5
Conservative	Richard Blyth	608	18.4	−9.5
Green	Jen Barnard	575	17.4	+2.2
Liberal Democrats	Ann Kingdom	275	8.3	+0.7
Yorkshire	Gareth O'Shanks	259	7.8	N/A
TUSC	Jack Jeffery	106	3.2	N/A
Majority		871	26.16	
Turnout		3,329	25.26	−3.11
Labour hold		Swing		

=== Richmond ===
Richmond
Party	Candidate	Votes	%	±%
Labour	Mike Drabble*	1,669	50.4	+13.3
Conservative	Lesley Blyth	709	21.4	−5.4
Green	Catherine Hartley	412	12.4	−1.4
Yorkshire	Dennis Bannan	290	8.8	N/A
Liberal Democrats	Susan Ross	187	5.6	+1.2
TUSC	Simon Moulton	44	1.3	N/A
Majority		960	28.67	
Turnout		3,348	23.83	−3.80
Labour hold		Swing		

=== Shiregreen & Brightside ===
Shiregreen & Brightside
Party	Candidate	Votes	%	±%
Labour	Garry Weatherall*	1,724	58.6	+4.1
Conservative	Zoe Steane	560	19.0	−11.0
Green	Milton Pennefather	325	11.1	+1.7
Liberal Democrats	Diane Leek	252	8.6	+2.4
Communist	Carrie Hedderwick	79	2.7	N/A
Majority		1,164	39.14	
Turnout		2,974	21.64	−2.28
Labour hold		Swing		

=== Southey ===
Southey
Party	Candidate	Votes	%	±%
Labour	Jayne Dunn*	1,629	56.5	+2.0
Conservative	Anthony May	573	19.9	−5.1
Green	Andrew Hards	446	15.5	+3.8
Liberal Democrats	Rob Reiss	236	8.2	+3.5
Majority		1,056	36.23	
Turnout		2,915	21.12	−1.83
Labour hold		Swing		

=== Stannington ===
Stannington
Party	Candidate	Votes	%	±%
Liberal Democrats	Vickie Priestley*	2,005	36.8	+5.1
Labour	Bridget Kelly	1,559	28.6	−0.4
Green	Ian McHugh	797	14.6	+2.8
Conservative	Ben Woollard	775	14.2	−10.6
No Description	Stuart Shepherd	190	3.5	N/A
UKIP	Michael Virgo	122	2.2	−0.6
Majority		446	8.14	
Turnout		5,480	38.16	−3.39
Liberal Democrats hold		Swing		

=== Stocksbridge & Upper Don ===
Stocksbridge & Upper Don
Party	Candidate	Votes	%	±%
Labour	Janet Ridler	1,952	38.6	+15.2
Conservative	David Chinchen	1,801	35.6	+3.4
Green	David Willington	733	14.5	+4.0
Liberal Democrats	Susan Davidson	567	11.2	−12.1
Majority		151	2.97	
Turnout		5,086	35.31	−3.70
Labour hold		Swing		

=== Walkley ===
Walkley
Party	Candidate	Votes	%	±%
Labour	Tom Hunt	2,517	43.8	+5.8
Green	Logan Robin	2,419	42.1	−3.9
Conservative	Evelyn Millward	384	6.7	−3.1
Liberal Democrats	David Pallot	248	4.3	+0.8
Women's Equality	Victoria Kensdale	95	1.7	+0.2
TUSC	Alexander-James Helie	89	1.5	+0.3
Majority		98	1.69	
Turnout		5,792	37.09	−1.41
Labour hold		Swing		

=== West Ecclesfield ===
West Ecclesfield
Party	Candidate	Votes	%	±%
Liberal Democrats	Mike Levery*	1,647	38.7	+3.3
Labour	Matthew Wilson	1,328	31.2	+3.7
Conservative	Kevin Mahoney	632	14.8	−3.2
Reform	John Booker	356	8.4	+1.7
Green	Kathy Aston	295	6.9	+1.5
Majority		319	7.45	
Turnout		4,284	31.91	−4.52
Liberal Democrats hold		Swing		

=== Woodhouse ===
Woodhouse
Party	Candidate	Votes	%	±%
Labour	Paul Wood*	1,745	54.1	−1.2
Conservative	Ian Walker	620	19.2	−11.1
Independent	Sarah Hobson	319	9.9	N/A
Green	Liam Hardy	263	8.2	−0.6
Liberal Democrats	Phil Edwardson	207	6.4	+0.8
TUSC	Simon Jenkins	70	2.2	N/A
Majority		1,125	34.75	
Turnout		3,237	25.01	−3.97
Labour hold		Swing		
