= Harold Elletson =

British politician (1960–2023)

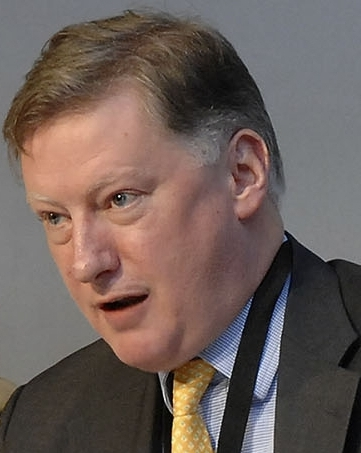
Elletson in 2007

Harold Daniel Hope Elletson (8 December 1960 – 23 June 2023) was a British politician.

Elletson unsuccessfully contested Burnley for the Conservative Party in the 1987 general election, before becoming Member of Parliament (MP) for Blackpool North in 1992. However, in his 1997 bid for re-election in the new Blackpool North and Fleetwood constituency, he lost to Labour's Joan Humble by 8,946 votes.

On 22 December 1996, The Observer newspaper claimed Elletson moonlighted as an MI6 agent: the headline read "Pro-Serb Tory MP was MI6 Agent". The newspaper said he was recruited before he entered the House of Commons, working for the intelligence agency in Eastern Europe, the former Soviet Union and during the conflict in the former Yugoslavia:

After visiting Yugoslavia in 1992, Mr Elletson notified his MI6 handlers that donations were reaching the Conservative Party from Serbia. MI6 received special sanction from the Prime Minister (John Major) for Mr Elletson to continue his secret role after his election in 1992. He carried out his unpaid intelligence work in Eastern Europe while representing the electors of Blackpool: he also ran an extensive network of private business interests in the region, while using his public position to mount a controversial defence of the Serb regime.

Elletson joined the Liberal Democrats in 2002. On 30 September 2014, as chairman of The Campaign for the North, he launched an all-party pressure group to re-create the ancient Kingdom of Northumbria as a federal state in a new United Kingdom. The Campaign seeks 'devo-max' power from Westminster to bring the traditional counties of Northumberland, Durham, Yorkshire, Lancashire, Westmorland and Cumberland into a democratic state with powers equal to Scotland, Wales, Northern Ireland or London, retaining membership of the European Union. The proposed Northumbria would cover the territory that was ruled a thousand years ago by the Norseman Erik Bloodaxe, the last 'king of the North', killed in battle at Stainmore in the Pennines in 954.

In 2015, he co-founded the Northern Party to campaign for better representation for Northern England. At the 2015 general election, he contested the constituency of Lancaster and Fleetwood, coming last with 0.4% of the vote. At the 2019 general election, he endorsed the incumbent Labour MP, Cat Smith.

Elletson died from a pulmonary embolism in Germany on 23 June 2023, at the age of 62.

Parliament of the United Kingdom
Preceded by Norman Miscampbell	Member of Parliament for Blackpool North; 1992–1997	Succeeded by Joan Humble (Blackpool North and Fleetwood)
