= 2021 Wirral Metropolitan Borough Council election =

British municipal election

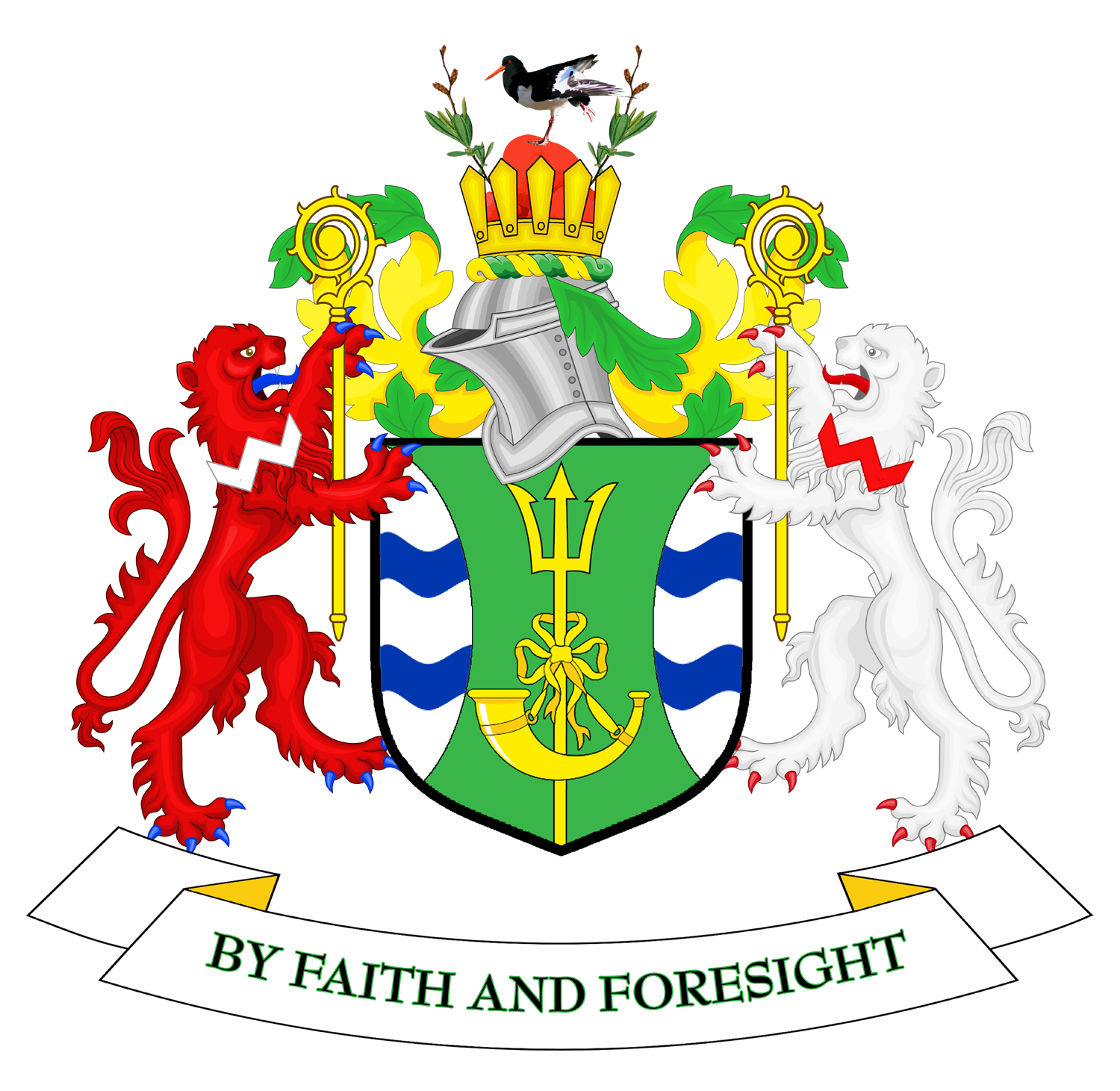
- 6 May 2021

23 of 66 seats (One Third and one by-election) to Wirral Metropolitan Borough Council 34 seats needed for a majority
- Turnout: 36.0% (▼1.1%)
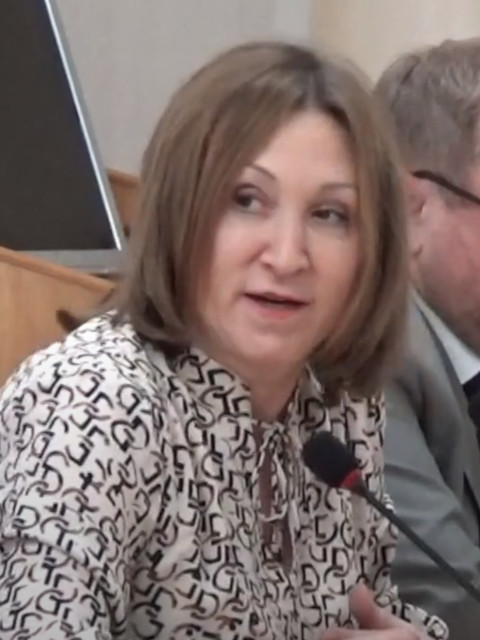

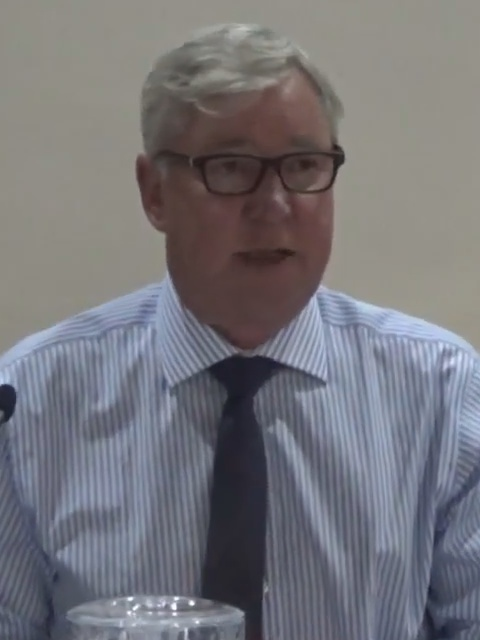

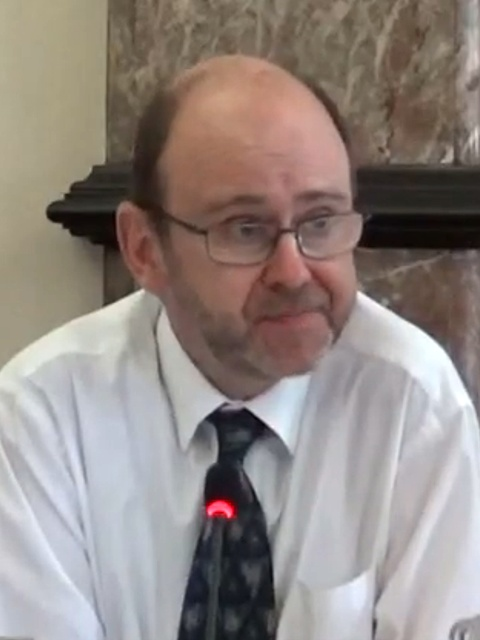

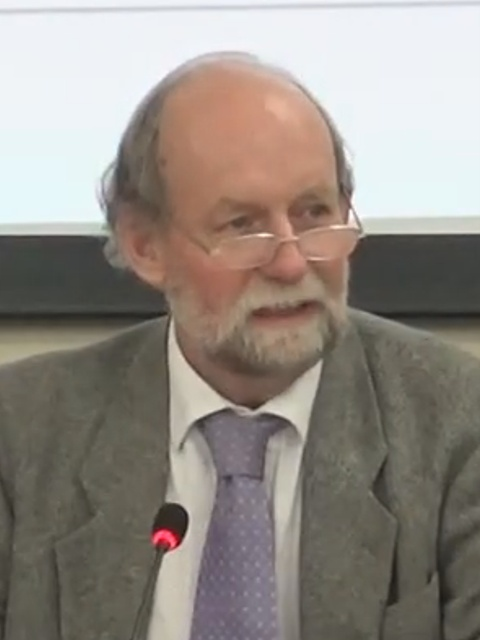
	First party	Second party
Leader	Janette Williamson	Jeff Green
Party	Labour	Conservative
Leader since	29 June 2020	22 December 2020
Leader's seat	Liscard	West Kirby and Thurstaston
Last election	10 seats, 35.8%	8 seats, 32.1%
Seats before	32	22
Seats won	10	8
Seats after	30	23
Seat change	▼2	▲1
Popular vote	34,643	29,000
Percentage	39.7%	33.3%
Swing	▲3.9%	▲1.2%
	Third party	Fourth party
Leader	Pat Cleary	Phil Gilchrist
Party	Green	Liberal Democrats
Leader since	22 May 2014	16 May 2013
Leader's seat	Birkenhead and Tranmere	Eastham
Last election	2 seats, 16.7%	2 seats, 11.6%
Seats before	2	6
Seats won	3	2
Seats after	5	6
Seat change	▲3	Steady
Popular vote	13,915	8,788
Percentage	16.0%	10.1%
Swing	▼0.7%	▼1.5%
- Map of results of 2021 election
Leader of the Council before election
Janette Williamson (Labour)
No Overall Control
Leader of the Council after election
Janette Williamson (Labour)
No Overall Control

The 2021 Wirral Metropolitan Borough Council election took place on 6 May 2021 to elect members of Wirral Metropolitan Borough Council in England. This election was held on the same day as other local elections. The election was originally due to take place in May 2020, but was postponed due to the COVID-19 pandemic. This delay meant those elected (excluding the by-election) would serve only a three-year term.

After the election, the composition of the council was:

Party	Seats	±
Labour	30	▼2
Conservative	23	▲1
Liberal Democrat	6	Steady
Green	5	▲2
Independent	2	▼2
Source: The Guardian

== Election results ==
=== Overall election result ===
Overall result compared with 2019.

Wirral Metropolitan Borough Council election result, 2021
Party	Candidates						Votes		
Party	Stood	Elected	Gained	Unseated	Net	% of total	%	No.	Net %
Labour	23	10	1	3	▼2	40.9	39.7	34,643	▲3.9
Conservative	23	8	1	0	▲1	36.4	33.3	29,000	▲1.2
Green	23	3	3	0	▲3	13.6	16.0	13,915	▼0.7
Liberal Democrats	23	2	0	0	Steady	9.1	10.1	8,788	▼1.5
Independent	1	0	0	2	▼2	0.0	0.6	547	▼0.8
Reform	4	0	0	0	Steady	0.0	0.3	249	New
For Britain	1	0	0	0	Steady	0.0	0.1	67	New

(Note: % of total refers to % of wards won.)

=== Changes in council composition ===
Prior to the election the composition of the council was:

↓
32	22	6	2	4
Lab	Con	LD	G	Ind

After the election the composition of the council was:

↓
30	23	6	5	2
Lab	Con	LD	G	I

Wirral Metropolitan Borough Council composition after the 2021 election as held in the Floral Pavilion Theatre

== Parties and candidates ==
=== Contesting political parties ===
Party	Leader	Leader since	Leader's ward	Up for re-election?	Last election		This election	
Party	Leader	Leader since	Leader's ward	Up for re-election?	% of votes	Wards	Defending	Prior Composition
Labour	Janette Williamson	29 June 2020	Liscard	✗	35.8%	10	11	32 / 66
Conservative	Jeff Green	22 December 2020	West Kirby and Thurstaston	✗	32.1%	8	7	22 / 66
Liberal Democrats	Phil Gilchrist	16 May 2013	Eastham	✓	11.6%	2	2	6 / 66
Green	Pat Cleary	22 May 2014	Birkenhead and Tranmere	✗	16.7%	2	0	2 / 66
Independent	Moira McLaughlin	22 February 2019	Rock Ferry	✗	1.4%	0	2	4 / 66

=== 2020 Candidate selection ===
In August 2019, incumbent Labour councillor for Prenton Tony Norbury was not approved for candidacy by the Local campaign forum thus was unable to seek re-selection. Former Prenton councillor Angie Davies, who lost her seat in May to the Green's Chris Cooke, was selected as the new Labour candidate in October. The Greens are fielding Harry Gorman who was selected in June.

Tom Usher, then youngest member of council and cabinet member for Children and Families, lost a selection contest in his Liscard Labour branch in October to Dave Brennan by 21 votes to 30. This was criticised by Independent group leader, and former Labour councillor, Moira McLaughlin who perceived Usher as having been "booted out by the hard-left". Liscard labour chair Edwina Doyle dismissed this notion putting the result down to Usher being "a bit younger and less experienced [than Brennan]". In January 2020, he was selected to contest the neighboring, Conservative held, ward of Wallasey.

Conservative councillor Chris Blakeley died of cancer on 15 January. A casual vacancy was announced on 6 February with the seat to be filled at the upcoming election when Blakeley's term was due to end. Simon Mountney, who had served alongside Blakeley as a fellow ward councillor from 2004 to 2014, was selected as the Conservative candidate in March. Though he was replaced by Max Booth the following January after the elections had been rescheduled. Mountney was later selected to contest the West Kirby and Thurstaston ward.

The Conservatives posted an appeal for candidates on Twitter on 17 February for wards in the Wallasey and Birkenhead constituencies.

=== 2021 Candidate selection ===
Chase Newton was selected as the Lib Dem candidate for Bromborough on 23 July 2020 succeeding Vicky Downie who stood down for personal reasons. Downie had been the party's candidate in the ward for the previous three elections.

Former Labour Councillor Bill Davies resigned his seat in September with a casual vacancy announced on the 7th.

Conservative councillor Geoffrey Watt died on 24 September 2020 after a short illness.

=== Campaign ===
On 24 February, Leader of the Council Pat Hackett announced he was standing down as both leader and councillor for New Brighton later in the year. This was, however, to be in July after the election was scheduled. Hackett was succeeded as Leader of the Labour Group by his deputy Janette Williamson on 29 June 2020. She was voted in as Leader of the Council in a virtual meeting on 28 September. Hackett later resigned his seat in September.

A leaked internal Labour report released on 3 March 2020 predicted severe losses for the party at the upcoming local elections across the country. Wirral, however, was one of only two authorities (the other being Burnley) seen as a possible gain for Labour with Wirral being the only positive prediction under all models used within the report.

On 13 March it was announced that all elections due to be held in May would be suspended until the following year due to the COVID-19 pandemic.

An e-newsletter created by the Oxton Labour Party revealed that it and the rest of the Birkenhead constituency party were not delivering leaflets due to the ongoing COVID-19 pandemic.

Leader of the Conservative group Ian Lewis resigned on 15 December 2020 citing internal party problems. Lewis's predecessor Jeff Green was elected leader on 22 December beating controversial Greasby, Frankby and Irby councillor David Burgess-Joyce.

== Retiring councillors ==
Ward	Departing Councillor	Party	Ref.
Birkenhead and Tranmere	Jean Stapleton	Labour	
Leasowe and Moreton East	Anita Leech	Labour	
Moreton West and Saughall Massie	Chris Blakeley	Conservative (died on 15 January 2020)	
Pensby and Thingwall	Mike Sullivan	Independent	
Prenton	Tony Norbury	Labour (deselected)	
New Brighton	Pat Hackett	Labour (retired on 30 September 2020)	
Rock Ferry	Bill Davies	Independent (retired on 7 September 2020; died later that year)	
West Kirby and Thurstaston	Geoffrey Watt	Conservative (died on 24 September 2020)	

== Ward results ==
Results compared directly with the last local election in 2019.

=== Bebington ===
Bebington
Party	Candidate	Votes	%	±%
Green	Jason Walsh	3,167	59.8	▲50.2
Labour	Christina Muspratt	1,536	29.0	▼21.1
Conservative	Geoff Jones	529	10.0	▼14.6
Liberal Democrats	Vicky Downie	63	1.2	▼14.6
Majority		1,631	30.8	N/A
Registered electors		11,839		
Turnout		5,350	45.2	▲7.8
Rejected ballots		55	1.0	Steady
Green gain from Labour		Swing	▲35.7	

=== Bidston and St James ===
Bidston and St James
Party	Candidate	Votes	%	±%
Labour	Julie McManus	1,581	69.6	▲1.9
Conservative	Tina McDonnell	364	16.0	▲5.4
Green	Diane Johnson	205	9.0	▼6.2
Liberal Democrats	Mike Parsons	122	5.4	▼1.1
Majority		1,217	53.6	▲1.1
Registered electors		10,498		
Turnout		2,309	22.0	▼0.9
Rejected ballots		37	1.6	▼0.4
Labour hold		Swing	▲0.5	

=== Birkenhead and Tranmere ===
Birkenhead and Tranmere
Party	Candidate	Votes	%	±%
Green	Emily Gleaves	1,765	61.9	▼4.0
Labour	Susan Mahoney	897	31.5	▼0.2
Conservative	June Cowin	153	5.4	▲3.1
Liberal Democrats	Edward Smith	35	1.2	New
Majority		868	30.5	▼3.7
Registered electors		10,400		
Turnout		2,886	27.8	▼5.4
Rejected ballots		36	1.2	▲0.4
Green gain from Labour		Swing	▼1.9	

=== Bromborough ===
Bromborough
Party	Candidate	Votes	%	±%
Labour	Jo Bird	2,248	61.1	▲13.1
Conservative	Anthony Drury	819	22.3	▲0.6
Green	Sheena Hatton	318	8.6	▼4.7
Liberal Democrats	Chase Newton	295	8.0	▼9.0
Majority		1,429	38.8	▲12.5
Registered electors		12,237		
Turnout		3,720	30.4	▲1.6
Rejected ballots		40	1.1	Steady
Labour hold		Swing	▲6.3	

=== Clatterbridge ===
Clatterbridge
Party	Candidate	Votes	%	±%
Conservative	Cherry Povall	2,414	51.8	▼1.4
Labour	Christopher Davies	1,426	30.6	▲1.5
Green	Jim McGinley	466	10.0	▼7.6
Liberal Democrats	Daniel Rogers	357	7.7	New
Majority		988	21.2	▼2.9
Registered electors		11,305		
Turnout		4,707	41.6	▼1.9
Rejected ballots		44	0.9	▼0.3
Conservative hold		Swing	▼1.5	

=== Claughton ===
Claughton
Party	Candidate	Votes	%	±%
Labour	George Davies	2,096	60.2	▲14.4
Conservative	Rania Elzeiny	608	17.5	▲1.9
Green	Liz Heydon	412	11.8	▼1.4
Liberal Democrats	Chris Teggin	300	8.6	▼2.6
For Britain	Gary Bergin	67	1.9	New
Majority		1,488	42.7	▲12.5
Registered electors		11,468		
Turnout		3,536	30.8	▲0.3
Rejected ballots		53	1.5	▲1.0
Labour hold		Swing	▲6.3	

=== Eastham ===
Eastham
Party	Candidate	Votes	%	±%
Liberal Democrats	Phillip Gilchrist	2,497	63.2	▲8.2
Labour	Shab Syed	792	20.1	▼6.9
Conservative	Paul Connolly	488	12.4	▲1.8
Green	Percy Hogg	171	4.3	▼3.2
Majority		1,705	43.2	▲15.2
Registered electors		11,069		
Turnout		3,972	35.9	▼2.2
Rejected ballots		24	0.6	▼0.2
Liberal Democrats hold		Swing	▲7.6	

=== Greasby, Frankby and Irby ===
Greasby, Frankby and Irby
Party	Candidate	Votes	%	±%
Conservative	Tom Anderson	2,755	54.3	▲2.0
Labour	Gail Jenkinson	1,585	31.2	▲13.6
Green	Cathy Page	428	8.4	▼4.3
Liberal Democrats	Mike Redfern	306	6.0	▼5.0
Majority		1,170	23.1	▼11.5
Registered electors		11,593		
Turnout		5,119	44.2	▼3.2
Rejected ballots		45	0.9	▲0.6
Conservative hold		Swing	▼5.8	

=== Heswall ===
Heswall
Party	Candidate	Votes	%	±%
Conservative	Kathy Hodson	2,785	56.1	▼4.0
Labour	Giuseppe Roberto	1,118	22.5	▲10.0
Liberal Democrats	Robert Thompson	535	10.8	▼2.6
Green	Barbara Burton	468	9.4	▼4.7
Reform	Ken Ferguson	60	1.2	New
Majority		1,667	33.6	▼12.4
Registered electors		10,903		
Turnout		5,021	46.1	▲1.3
Rejected ballots		55	1.1	▲0.3
Conservative hold		Swing	▼6.2	

=== Hoylake and Meols ===
Hoylake and Meols
Party	Candidate	Votes	%	±%
Conservative	Andrew Gardner	2,532	52.7	▲2.4
Labour	Matt Houghton	1,391	28.9	▲6.8
Green	Alix Cockcroft	548	11.4	▼5.9
Liberal Democrats	Peter Reisdorf	335	7.0	▼3.3
Majority		1,141	23.7	▼4.4
Registered electors		10,575		
Turnout		4,850	45.9	▲2.2
Rejected ballots		44	0.9	▼0.2
Conservative hold		Swing	▼2.2	

=== Leasowe and Moreton East ===
Leasowe and Moreton East
Party	Candidate	Votes	%	±%
Labour	Helen Collinson	1,943	54.1	▲6.2
Conservative	Debbie Caplin	1,409	39.2	▼0.4
Green	Michael Dixon	175	4.9	▼7.6
Liberal Democrats	John Mullins	64	1.8	New
Majority		534	14.9	▲6.6
Registered electors		11,118		
Turnout		3,631	32.7	▼1.1
Rejected ballots		40	1.1	Steady
Labour hold		Swing	▲3.3	

=== Liscard ===
Liscard
Party	Candidate	Votes	%	±%
Labour	David Brennan	1,898	56.9	▲5.9
Conservative	Jane Owens	875	26.2	▲8.3
Green	Perle Sheldricks	271	8.1	▼2.5
Liberal Democrats	Sue Arrowsmith	221	6.6	▼2.8
Reform	Dave Sharp	71	2.1	New
Majority		1,023	30.7	▼2.4
Registered electors		11,405		
Turnout		3,377	29.6	▼1.3
Rejected ballots		41	1.2	▲0.2
Labour hold		Swing	▼1.2	

=== Moreton West and Saughall Massie ===
Moreton West and Saughall Massie
Party	Candidate	Votes	%	±%
Conservative	Max Booth	2,206	56.2	▼7.2
Labour	Nicole Williams	1,320	33.6	▲7.1
Green	Helen O'Donnell	256	6.5	▼1.1
Liberal Democrats	David Tyrrell	84	2.1	▼0.4
Reform	Paul Whelligan	60	1.5	New
Majority		886	22.6	▼14.2
Registered electors		10,763		
Turnout		3,977	37.0	▼3.9
Rejected ballots		51	1.3	▲0.2
Conservative hold		Swing	▼7.2	

=== New Brighton ===
New Brighton (2)
Party	Candidate	Votes	%	±%
Labour	Tony Jones (Note: Elected to serve a 3-year term.)	2,204	55.1	▼1.9
Labour	Paul Martin (Note: Elected to serve a 2-year term.)	1,835	45.9	▼11.1
Conservative	Tony Pritchard	1,230	30.8	▲13.5
Conservative	Darren May	923	23.1	▲5.8
Green	Moira Gommon	492	12.3	▼1.4
Green	Cynthia Stonall	433	10.8	▼2.9
Liberal Democrats	Adam Keenan	214	5.4	▼1.1
Liberal Democrats	Charlie Smethurst	184	4.6	▼1.9
Majority		974	23.5	▼16.2
Registered electors		11,476		
Turnout		4,014	35.0	▼0.3
Rejected ballots		17	0.4	Steady
Labour hold		Swing	▼8.1	
Labour hold		Swing	—	

=== Oxton ===
Oxton
Party	Candidate	Votes	%	±%
Liberal Democrats	Stuart Kelly	2,311	57.0	▼2.8
Labour	Paul Jobson	1,050	25.9	▼3.7
Conservative	Phil Merry	328	8.1	▲3.1
Green	Judith Grier	306	7.5	New
Reform	Philip Griffiths	58	1.4	New
Majority		1,261	31.1	▲0.8
Registered electors		11,020		
Turnout		37.2	4,097	▼3.0
Rejected ballots		44	1.1	▲0.8
Liberal Democrats hold		Swing	▲0.5	

=== Pensby and Thingwall ===
Pensby and Thingwall
Party	Candidate	Votes	%	±%
Conservative	Ivan Camphor	2,234	48.4	▲3.6
Labour	Tim Watson	1,676	36.3	▲1.6
Green	Allen Burton	453	9.8	▼4.4
Liberal Democrats	Phil Waterfield	257	5.6	▼0.6
Majority		558	12.1	▲2.0
Registered electors		10,492		
Turnout		4,665	44.5	▼3.1
Rejected ballots		45	1.0	▲0.3
Conservative gain from Independent		Swing	▲1.0	

=== Prenton ===
Prenton
Party	Candidate	Votes	%	±%
Green	Harry Gorman	2,235	54.5	▼9.1
Labour	Angie Davies	1,441	35.2	▲3.2
Conservative	Hilary Jones	336	8.2	▲3.8
Liberal Democrats	Lucy Johnson	87	2.1	New
Majority		794	19.4	▼12.2
Registered electors		10,991		
Turnout		4,130	37.6	▼4.4
Rejected ballots		31	0.8	▲0.1
Green gain from Labour		Swing	▼6.2	

=== Rock Ferry ===
Rock Ferry
Party	Candidate	Votes	%	±%
Labour	Clare O'Hagan	1,521	55.7	▲10.7
Independent	Stephen Davies	547	20.0	▼18.5
Conservative	Nick Hanna	296	10.8	▲5.2
Green	Craig McDonald	271	9.9	▼1.1
Liberal Democrats	Tom Sutton	95	3.5	New
Majority		974	35.7	▲29.2
Registered electors		10,269		
Turnout		2,779	27.1	▼1.4
Rejected ballots		49	1.8	▲1.3
Labour gain from Independent		Swing	▲14.6	

=== Seacombe ===
Seacombe
Party	Candidate	Votes	%	±%
Labour	Paul Stuart	1,597	69.6	▲5.7
Conservative	Vida Wilson	405	17.7	▲8.3
Green	Hilary Cullen	208	9.1	▼2.4
Liberal Democrats	Anthony Morris	83	3.6	New
Majority		1,192	52.0	▲3.3
Registered electors		10,294		
Turnout		2,320	22.5	▼2.1
Rejected ballots		27	1.2	▲0.5
Labour hold		Swing	▲1.6	

=== Upton ===
Upton
Party	Candidate	Votes	%	±%
Labour	Jean Robinson	1,960	55.2	▲5.8
Conservative	Emma Sellman	1,017	28.6	▲2.5
Green	Lily Clough	432	12.2	▼5.5
Liberal Democrats	Alan Davies	143	4.0	▼2.8
Majority		943	26.5	▲3.2
Registered electors		12,409		
Turnout		3,589	28.9	▼0.8
Rejected ballots		37	1.0	▼0.1
Labour hold		Swing	▲1.7	

=== Wallasey ===
Wallasey
Party	Candidate	Votes	%	±%
Conservative	Ian Lewis	2,567	49.8	▼2.8
Labour	Tom Usher (Note: Incumbent councillor for Liscard ward.)	2,135	41.4	▲9.3
Green	Rachel Heydon	297	5.8	▼0.6
Liberal Democrats	John Codling	160	3.1	▼1.5
Majority		432	8.4	▼12.1
Registered electors		11,727		
Turnout		5,211	44.4	▼0.8
Rejected ballots		52	1.0	▲0.7
Conservative hold		Swing	▼6.1	

=== West Kirby and Thurstaston ===
West Kirby and Thurstaston
Party	Candidate	Votes	%	±%
Conservative	Simon Mountney	2,650	56.7	▲1.6
Labour	Louise Reecejones	1,228	26.3	▲5.5
Green	Yvonne McGinley	571	12.2	▼3.6
Liberal Democrats	Orod Osanlou	224	4.8	▼3.5
Majority		1,422	30.4	▼3.9
Registered electors		10,326		
Turnout		4,712	45.6	▲0.1
Rejected ballots		39	0.8	▲0.1
Conservative hold		Swing	▼2.0	

== Changes between 2021 and 2022 ==
=== Liscard by-election 2021 ===
Cllr Sarah Spoor, first elected in 2018, announced her resignation on 4 June 2021. A casual vacancy was announced on the 7th.

By-election, 22 July 2021: Liscard
Party	Candidate	Votes	%	±%
Labour	Daisy Kenny	1,137	53.6	▼3.3
Conservative	Jane Owens	582	27.4	▲1.2
Liberal Democrats	Sue Arrowsmith	201	9.5	▲2.9
Green	Edward Lamb	109	5.1	▼3.0
Independent	Lynda Williams	68	3.2	New
For Britain	Gary Bergin	26	1.2	New
Majority		555	26.1	▼4.6
Registered electors		11,399		
Turnout		2,128	18.7	▼10.9
Rejected ballots		5	0.2	▼1.0
Labour hold		Swing	▼2.3	

=== Oxton by-election 2021 ===
Cllr Andy Corkhill, first elected in 2019, died of cancer at the age of 36 on 4 October 2021. A casual vacancy was announced on the 20th.

By-election, 25 November 2021: Oxton
Party	Candidate	Votes	%	±%
Liberal Democrats	Orod Osanlou	1,666	68.3	▲11.3
Labour Co-op	Sue Mahoney	460	18.8	▼7.1
Conservative	Philip Merry	168	6.9	▼1.2
Green	Mary Heydon	147	6.0	▼1.5
Majority		1,206	49.4	▲18.3
Registered electors		10,795		
Turnout		22.7	2,447	▼14.5
Rejected ballots		6	0.2	▼0.9
Liberal Democrats hold		Swing	▲9.2	

=== Other changes ===
Date	Ward	Name	Previous affiliation	New affiliation	Circumstance
19 November 2021	Bromborough	Jo Bird	Labour Co-op	Independent	Expelled.

== See also ==
- 2021 Liverpool City Region mayoral election
- 2021 Merseyside police and crime commissioner election

== Notes ==
• italics denote the sitting councillor • bold denotes the winning candidate
