= Northern Party =

2015–2016 regionalist political party in England

- Founders: Michael Dawson; Harold Elletson
- Chairman: Ron Bell
- Founded: 2015
- Dissolved: 2016
- Ideology: Regionalism in Northern England
- Colours: Orange; White

The Northern Party was a regionalist political party in Northern England, founded by leader Michael Dawson and former Blackpool MP; Harold Elletson, in March 2015 to contest five marginal seats in Lancashire at the 2015 general election. The party was one of three regionalist parties contesting the general election in the north of England. Members included former activists from the Conservative, Labour, Liberal Democrat and Green parties.

== Founding ==
Michael Dawson, a former Executive Committee member of the Labour Campaign for Human Rights, is the nephew of former MP for Lancaster Hilton Dawson who now runs the North East Party. At the launch of the party he said "We've been planning this for months. This is a Northern rebellion against a system that has failed the North." The party argued for Northern England devolution of power to an autonomous Northern region, and for business investment and environmental protection.

The party described its symbol as "a Norse raven, closely associated with the ancient kingdom of Northumbria (today's North of England) and the struggle for autonomy".

== Electoral history ==
The party stood candidates in five seats in Lancashire:

- Morecambe and Lunesdale: Michael Dawson (85 votes). Dawson appeared on the ballot as an independent.
- Lancaster and Fleetwood: Harold Elletson (174 votes). Elletson was the Conservative MP for Blackpool North 1992-1997.
- Blackpool North and Cleveleys: James Walsh (57 votes). Walsh is an ecologist, former Green Party member, and part of Frack Free Lancashire.
- Fylde: Elizabeth Clarkson (230 votes). Clarkson had been a Conservative councillor in Preston.
- Rossendale & Darwen: Shaun Hargreaves (45 votes). Hargreaves was previously in the Green Party.

Paul Salveson noted the smaller vote share than the North East Party and Yorkshire First at the same General Election and a lack of parish councillors versus those other parties, and suggested this was because the Northern Party, though they stood in Lancashire, had a Northern identity rather than a Lancashire identity.

== Organisation ==
The party was registered with the Electoral Commission on 1 April 2015, with Michael Dawson as Leader and Treasurer and Stephen Gilpin as Nominating Officer and an address in Liverpool. Chairman Ron Bell was a former Conservative councillor and prospective parliamentary candidate in Blackpool South. The Northern Party voluntarily deregistered as a party on 8 April 2016.

== See also ==
- North East Party, a regional party calling for a North East Assembly
- Yorkshire Party, a regional party calling for a Yorkshire Parliament
- Northern Independence Party, a regional party calling for Northern England independence
- North–South divide in England
