= Northern Independence Party =

Secessionist and democratic socialist political party in England

- Abbreviation: NIP
- Leader: Heather Oldfield Steenson
- Founders: Philip Proudfoot; Evie McGovern
- National Chair: Suzanne Clifton
- Founded: 22 October 2020; 5 years ago
- Registered: 30 June 2021; 5 years ago
- Headquarters: 10 Houghton Avenue; Warrington, Cheshire; WA2 7EQ; England
- Membership (2021): 1,400
- Ideology: Sovereigntism; Democratic socialism
- Political position: Left-wing
- National affiliation: People's Alliance of the Left
- Colours: Burgundy; Yellow
- Slogan: "It's About Bloody Time"

Website
- www.freethenorth.co.uk

The Northern Independence Party (NIP) is a minor sovereigntist and democratic socialist party that seeks to make the region of Northern England an independent nation, under the name of Northumbria, after the medieval kingdom of the same name. The party, which was founded in October 2020 by the lecturer and former Labour activist Philip Proudfoot, currently has no elected representatives.

== History ==
The NIP was formed on 22 October 2020 by Philip Proudfoot, an international development studies lecturer at the University of Sussex and former Labour Party activist from County Durham, along with his colleague Evie McGovern and other former Labour activists who were alienated by what they saw as Keir Starmer's move towards the centre as leader of the party. Proudfoot was inspired to found the party after watching Andy Burnham's critical response to the Westminster government's support package for Greater Manchester during the COVID-19 pandemic. He told Big Issue North that the centralisation of power in London had played a part as well, highlighting the North-South divide in healthcare, transport, education, and general standard of living as motivating factors.

The NIP applied to the Electoral Commission for registration on 12 February 2021, but the application was rejected on the grounds of its initial application being incomplete. On 24 March, the party reapplied for registration, and announced on 30 June that it was registered with the Electoral Commission.

Following the NIP announcement that it had selected former Labour MP Thelma Walker as its candidate for the Hartlepool by-election in May 2021, it was reported by Huffington Post UK that the party's membership had increased from 300 members to 1,300.

Initially, the party was led by Proudfoot. He stood down in July 2022 due to professional commitments and was replaced by David Heaven. Proudfoot went on to join the Green Party on 19 November 2023.

The party was de-registered by the Electoral Commission on 13 November 2024. In May 2025, the party was investigated by the Electoral Commission over a late delivery of statement of accounts for 2023. The Electoral Commission considered that the party's explanation was sufficient, and the investigation closed without further action. However, on 12 September 2025, the party was re-registered with the Electoral Commission.

== Policies ==
King Oswald's Banner, used to represent the greater region and former kingdom of Northumbria.

Inspired by the Scottish National Party's campaign for an independent Scotland, the NIP seeks to make the North of England an independent state under the name Northumbria, which previously existed as an Anglo-Saxon medieval kingdom from the 7th century until the 10th century. Proudfoot has said that the geography of Northumbria would consist of Yorkshire, Lancashire, Cumbria, Merseyside, Tyne and Wear, Greater Manchester, County Durham, Northumberland and Cheshire, and, since 2022, has generally included the borough of High Peak in northern Derbyshire within it. The party has proposed York as a possible capital city, though has also proposed having multiple capitals.

The NIP describes itself as a democratic socialist party, advocating for a "green industrial rebirth" and "socialism with a northern accent", proposing a market socialist economy, with a more decentralised system and an emphasis on co-operatives, locally-owned businesses and social enterprises. The party also endorses the principles of community wealth building, known as the Preston Model. It has also said that in an independent North, it would nationalise some industries where feasible, including utilities, public transport and the National Health Service. It supports the nationalisation of broadband to make it free at the point of delivery.

Identifying itself as a post-Brexit party, the NIP's draft manifesto stated that an independent North could make a decision to join the European Union via a referendum "in the distant future". It would also leave the question of whether an independent North would retain the monarchy to the electorate, in a referendum that would be held on the issue if it arose. The NIP also opposes First Past the Post as an electoral system, believing that its replacement should be determined by a constitutional assembly.

It was reported that much of the party's initial support has been drawn from disillusionment with Starmer's leadership of the Labour Party, particularly on the party's left flank.

== Reception ==
Stewart Arnold of The Yorkshire Post argued that the party's presence would be "good for democracy as it will challenge the two main parties to present suitable plans that allow Yorkshire and the rest of the North to take control of its own destiny and unleash its potential", while in The Guardian, Alex Niven was sceptical of the party's chances, noting that the "archaic first-past-the-post system makes it extremely difficult for smaller parties to establish a foothold in Westminster". He compared the NIP's prospects to UKIP but with "none of UKIP's advantages and most of its limitations", although he suggested that the party "might just be the start of a more general realignment in British politics", noting "If even a minority of disaffected Corbynite northerners get behind NIP, [...] Labour's downslide will accelerate."

In an opinion piece for The Times, former Labour staff member James Matthewson called the NIP "a glorified joke" and accused it of being a "fetishisation of Northern working-class culture by privileged, middle class hard-left ideologues". Labour MP for Liverpool Riverside, Kim Johnson, dismissed the party's slogan, 'It's About Bloody Time', and use of a logo featuring a whippet as "patronising in the extreme".

In the New Statesman, Freddie Hayward, while dismissing favourable comparisons to the Scottish independence movement, concluded that the party "may be quixotic, or it may be the germination of a political force that gives the north 'national consequence'" and that it may be "needed to hold the major parties accountable for failing to address the north–south divide". In the same outlet, contributor Jonn Elledge criticised the party's decision not to contest northern mayoralties, writing that while anything to "make everyone pay more attention to the north has to be a good thing", he viewed the party's targeting of Labour voters as potentially "handing another red-wall seat to the governing party" which would be unlikely to "wake up ministers to the need to give more money and attention to anywhere north of Stevenage".

Writing for Novara Media, psephology blogger Ell Folan, though dismissive of Thelma Walker's chances to win Hartlepool, believed the NIP "could easily cost Labour key seats in the future (especially with the Tories so far ahead in the polls)", concluding that "with leftism still popular in the north, regionalism on the rise and Labour's red wall no longer solid, Starmer needs to take the NIP seriously – or it won't seem like a joke much longer".

Gerry Hart of Red Pepper wrote that northern independence could be a distraction for the left, expressing concern that "there still exists a paucity of analysis as to what northern independence actually means".

== Elections ==
=== Parliamentary by-elections ===
On 28 March 2021, the NIP selected Thelma Walker, formerly the Labour MP for Colne Valley from 2017 to 2019, as its candidate at the Hartlepool by-election. However, as the party was not registered with the Electoral Commission before the candidate nomination deadline, she appeared on the ballot as an Independent. She received 250 votes, coming eighth with 0.84% of the vote and losing her deposit.

The NIP stood in the 2022 Wakefield by-election with Christopher Jones receiving 84 votes, coming 14th out of 15 with 0.3% of the vote and losing his deposit.

=== Local elections ===
The party endorsed four independent candidates in the 2021 local elections in the Derby and Litherland wards of Sefton and the Pendleton & Charlestown ward of Salford. None of these candidates were elected.

The NIP ran eight candidates in the 2022 local elections in the Kingstone ward of Barnsley, the Beeston and Holbeck ward of Leeds, West Fenham and Wingrove wards of Newcastle upon Tyne, the Litherland ward of Sefton, the City and Crookes and Crosspool wards of Sheffield, and West Kirby and Thurstaston ward of Wirral. None of these candidates were elected.

NIP ran two candidates in the 2023 local elections in the Headingley and Hyde Park ward of Leeds and the City Centre South ward of Liverpool. Neither of these candidates were elected.

== See also ==
- Devolution to the North of England
- North East Party, a regional party calling for a North East Assembly
- Northern Party, a defunct regional party that was based in Lancashire
- North–South divide in England
- Yorkshire Party, a regional party calling for a Yorkshire Parliament
