= North–South divide in England =

Cultural and socio-economic differences

The nine regions of England grouped into a northern, midlands, and southern groupings. Northern England The Midlands Southern England

In England, the term North–South divide refers to the cultural, economic, and social differences between Southern England and Northern England:

- Southern England usually refers to South East England and in some definitions, The East Of England, including Greater London.
- Northern England usually refers to North East England, Yorkshire and the Humber and North West England including Merseyside and Greater Manchester.

There is also the central region of the Midlands which historically was administered by the Kingdom of Mercia whose borders were defined by the Mersey, the Humber, the Severn and the Thames as shown by its flag, a saltire cross. Counties in the north of the area, such as Derbyshire, Leicestershire, Lincolnshire, Nottinghamshire, Rutland and Staffordshire are sometimes seen as Northern. A grouping of "Central England" based on European parliamentary constituency boundaries combined the Midlands and East Anglia until the United Kingdom's departure from the European Union in January 2020.

The cultural, economic, and social disparities between the north and the south are reflected in English politics. Between the early 20th century and 2019, the Labour Party was the dominant political party in the north and the Conservative Party was dominant in the south. The 2019 general election is sometimes described as a great political realignment as a result of Brexit, with the north moving significantly towards the pro-Brexit Conservatives and away from Labour who were split on the issue of Brexit. However, Danny MacKinnon, Professor of Regional Development and Governance at Newcastle University, noted that Labour's vote share in the north outside of metropolitan areas had declined consistently since 2001, with the exception of 2017.

An article in The Economist published in 2012 argued that the gap between the north and south in life expectancy, political inclinations and economics trends was growing to the extent that they were almost separate countries.

== Definition and criteria ==
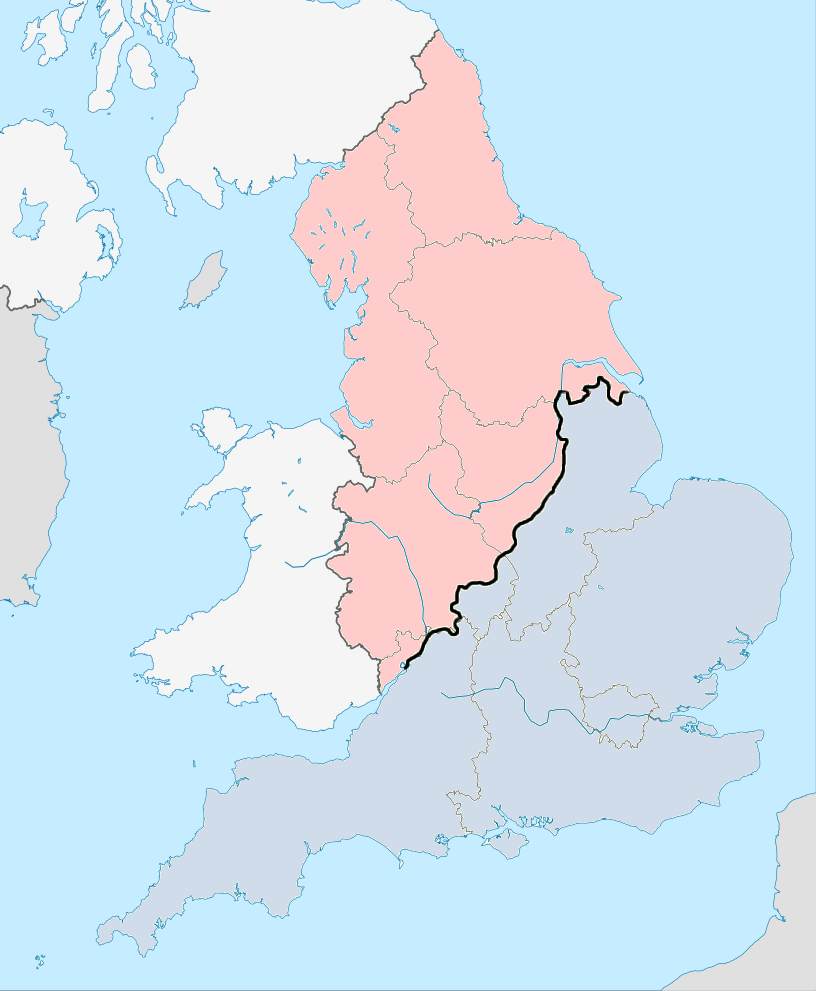
An English North-South dividing line defined by Danny Dorling, former geography professor at the University of Sheffield

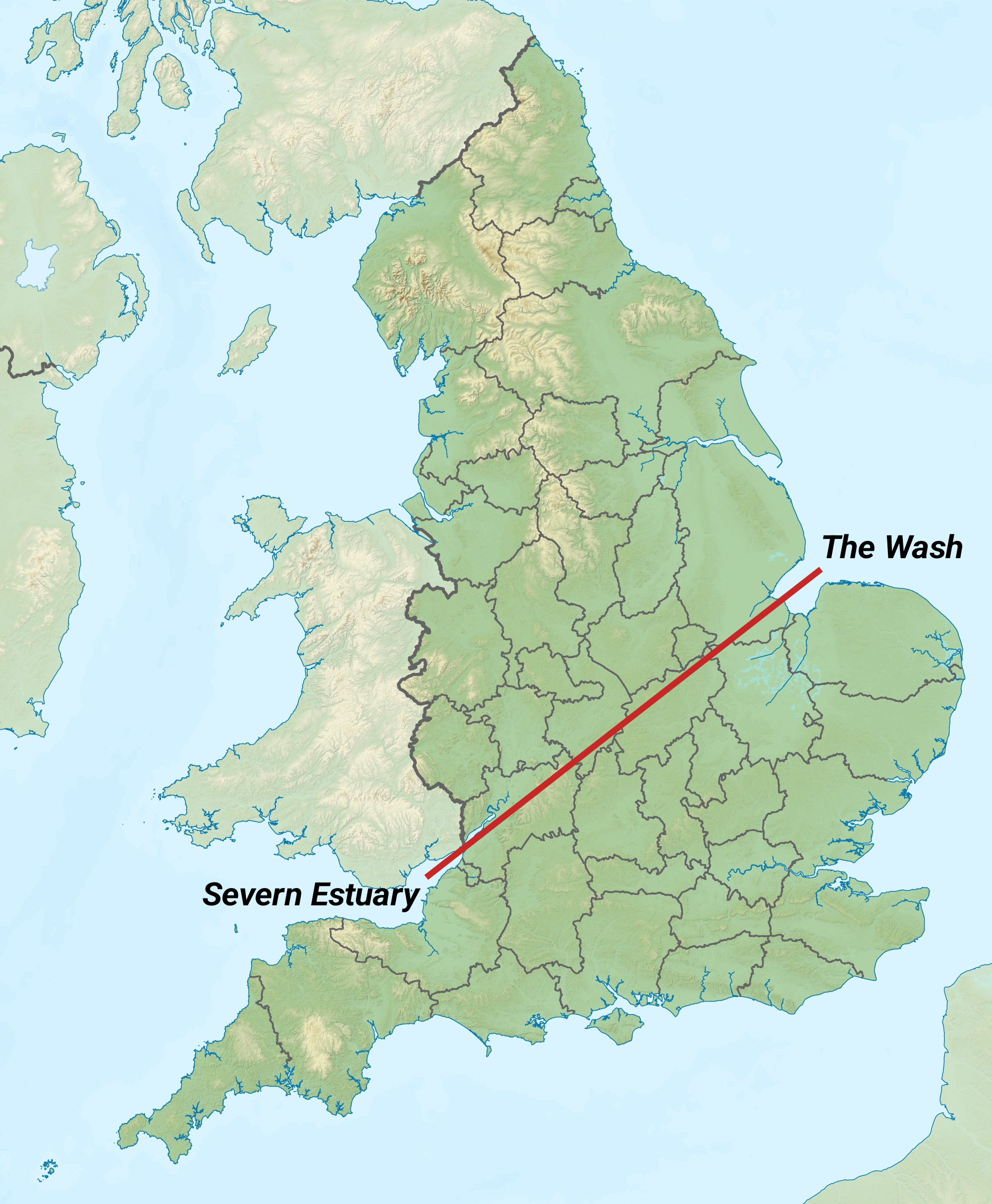
Severn-Wash Line, a common but unofficial way to define the north–south divide in England

The North–South divide is not an exact line, but one that can involve many stereotypes, presumptions and other impressions of the surrounding region relative to other regions. There is considerable debate between scholars over the degree of difference. For example, a Cambridge Econometrics report of March 2006 found that economic growth above the UK average was occurring only in the South and South East England, whilst North East England showed the slowest growth. The same data has been interpreted otherwise to indicate only a very small difference. Indeed, results are highly dependent on the categories chosen for evaluation. As a generalisation, the following tend to indicate that there is some sort of north–south divide:

- Health conditions, which are generally seen as being worse in the north, though spending on healthcare is higher.
- House prices, which are higher in the south, particularly the south-east.
- Average earnings, which are significantly higher in the south and east.
- Political influence.
- Public investment in London and the south-east per person in the five years to 2019–20, was 50% more than that in the North.

However, when factors such as the cost of living or urban poverty are included, the divisions are sometimes less clear. Some commentators have suggested that other divisions, such as class or ethnicity might be more important.

The Economist claims that one of the main causes of the divide was the migration of young professionals from the north to work in London, whereas it is much less common for young professionals from the south to move to a northern city. The Institute for Public Policy Research published the "State of the North 2019" report, from IPPR North, which blames regional inequality on power centralisation and the lack of devolution. The report showed that the UK has larger regional divisions than any other country at a comparable level of economic development.

The Northern Independence Party was founded in October 2020, with the intention of fixing the north–south divide by gaining independence for the North of England.

== Identities and differences ==
=== Culture ===
There is a perceived cultural divide in England between the north and the south.

When the commercial broadcaster Granada Television began transmission in 1956, it was primarily based in Manchester. Granada's strapline before both networked and regional programming was originally "From The North, Granada Presents...". A large arrow pointing Upward (North) was part of this caption. Granada Television's 1960s updated arrow (a G with an upwards arrow) was prominent on local idents and production until GranadaTV's identity was divided between the ITV Granada and Granada Productions (later ITV Studios) brands as part of the creation of ITV plc in 2004.

Counterbalancing the image of the rich South/poor North divide are television programmes like Cold Feet, which feature Yuppie-esque, rich or upper-class Northerners, a deviation from the stereotypical North. Meanwhile, Only Fools and Horses is based around working-class life in Peckham.

Statistics suggest that the consumption of fast food appears to be higher in the North of England, with the UK's fourteen "fattest cities" to the north or west of the dividing lines detailed above.

The 2005 BBC Two interview series It's Grim Up North and subsequent book by Judith Holder attempted to tease out some of these divisions. While those in the north complained of having fewer cultural opportunities, the book also provided a view of southern life as faceless and bland.

=== Politics ===
In 2013, two articles in The Economist argued that the divide between the left-leaning North and the right-leaning South could not be explained by economic fortunes alone. For example, the affluent suburban constituency of Wirral South was held by Labour, whereas deprived seaside towns in Thanet were represented by the Conservatives. One of the articles compared England's North–South divide to the divide between Northern and Southern Italy. It argued that Italy had a stronger economic divide, whereas England had a stronger divide in voter behaviour. The latter divide has been made starker by the first past the post voting system, which has caused Labour's representation in the South and (until the 2019 general election) the Conservatives' representation in the North to both be far weaker than their actual levels of support.

The journalist Kelvin MacKenzie suggested in 2012 that the South of England needed a political party to campaign for its interests, including "home rule" for the region. City A.M. editor Allister Heath had made a similar suggestion in April 2012, and opined that increased powers for the London region might be obtained when the constitutional status of Scotland is debated.

The north–south divide has also been observed in the Brexit referendum of 2016, with the North leaning Brexit and the South being less supportive with strong support for remaining in the European Union seen in London and the South East.

In 2019, many traditionally Labour seats in the so-called red wall were won by the Conservatives, many for the first time. Historically, constituencies in the North Midlands and Northern England tended to vote for the Labour Party. It is noteworthy the erosion of the Labour Party vote in the north and midlands began in the 2001 general election, with a continual trend of decline until 2017. However, the trend returned strongly in 2019. In 2014, political scientists Matthew Goodwin and Robert Ford documented the erosion by UKIP of the Labour-supporting working-class vote in their book, Revolt on the Right.

In 2021, the Conservative government launched a Levelling up policy to address the North–South divide as part of a broader objective. In September 2021 the Ministry for Housing, Communities and Local Government was renamed the Department for Levelling Up, Housing and Communities under Secretary of State Michael Gove, and a Levelling Up Taskforce was created to define the policy in more detail.

=== Language and dialect ===
Although younger generations may be less likely to use speech that is specific to a particular town, there is still a clear difference between north and south; young Northerners are more resistant to sounding as if they are Southern than sounding as if they are from a different Northern town.

The division is sometimes used for comedy, but has its serious side as well. The London media are sometimes claimed to look down upon those with northern English accents. For example, Ken Livingstone (a Londoner) suggested that the press's unsympathetic treatment of John Prescott was partly because he is one to "speak like ordinary people".

Some linguistic research has concluded that many people in the North of England have a dislike of the /ɑː/ vowel in BATH words. AF Gupta wrote, "Many of the northerners were noticeably hostile to /ɡrɑːs/, describing it as 'comical', 'snobbish', 'pompous' or even 'for morons'." On the subject, K. M. Petyt wrote that several respondents "positively said that they did not prefer the long-vowel form or that they really detested it or even that it was incorrect" Mark Newbrook has assigned this phenomenon the name "conscious rejection", and has cited the BATH vowel as "the main instance of conscious rejection of RP" in his research in the West Wirral.

=== Religion ===
North–south divide between the Provinces of Canterbury and York

Within the Church of England, there is the Province of York in the North and the Province of Canterbury in the Midlands and the South. While this has a separation of sorts, it is not a North–South divide, as the Midlands is included. The North was also a stronghold of religious Nonconformism during its industrial heyday.

In the 18th century people in the North were also much more likely than those in the South to remain Catholic. Data from 1715 to 1720 shows that the most Catholic counties were all in the North, and the least Catholic counties were all in the South. With the exception of the southern county of Sussex, which had a higher proportion of Catholics, all intermediate counties were in the Midlands, and, except for Sussex, a line from the River Severn to The Wash marked a divide between more Catholic and less Catholic counties.

== Explanation ==
Industrial decline is most usually given as an explanation for the north–south divide. During the Industrial Revolution, many northern cities underwent a process of intense industrialisation, as raw materials such as coal and iron ore could be found in these areas. This led to comparatively high wealth; Shaw, Greater Manchester reportedly had the highest concentration of millionaires in the country at the time. It also led to heavy reliance on a few key industries and, as heavy industry began to leave the UK for developing countries under the 'New international division of Labour', these areas declined rapidly. Events like the UK miners' strike (1984–85) polarised public opinion and led to an increase in the divide.

Potential historical reasons for the divide include the influence of Scandinavian rule in the latter centuries of the first millennium CE, with much of the cultural differences of the north–south divide coinciding with the borders of the Danelaw. The Economist proposed in a 2017 article that the origins of the north–south divide could be traced back to the Norman Conquest, and the Harrying of the North in which William the Conqueror laid waste to many towns and estates in the North. This significantly reduced the wealth of the northern half of the country, laying the foundations for centuries of economic disadvantage.

== The Midlands ==
Location of the Midlands in the centre of England.

The North Midlands are sometimes seen as part of the north. Many towns and cities in the northern areas of the Midlands appear, at least historically, to have more in common with their northern counterparts than with those in the south. This is mainly because they have a history of concentrated industrialisation and post-industrial economic depression, especially in the West Midlands metropolitan county and Stoke-on-Trent (and the Potteries). The film Once Upon a Time in the Midlands (2004), starring Ricky Tomlinson, was made in the character of the straight-talking and dry humoured northern comedies.

However, during the 1930s while the North suffered badly from the Great Depression, the Midlands shared the fortunes of the South as these two areas of the country both prospered, with a booming Midlands motor car industry matching the Southern growth in the manufacture of electrical goods. This not only placed the Midlands socially on the same side as the South during a crucial defining period in Northern working class cultural identity, but also has had still-visible matching effects on the landscape of both Midlands and South, as both experienced a property boom in the middle years of the decade. This resulted in the proliferation of the 1930s-style semi-detached houses in Midland areas such as Birmingham's south suburbs to match a similar manifestation in areas of the South such as West London.

As in the North, many Midlands towns and cities have experienced redevelopment, including a second Birmingham Bullring complex which replaced a postwar development, including a branch of the upmarket Selfridges department store, and The Mailbox redevelopment which houses a branch of Harvey Nichols. Solihull metropolitan borough is one of the most affluent in the country.

=== East Anglia ===
East Anglia, an area of the official region of The East Of England, has recently become involved with the divide when it comes to geography and wealth disparity. Some people have placed it into its own region due to many cities and towns within the area being argued to match Northern working class cultural identity, or at least Midlands working class cultural identity. This is due to the surprisingly large and almost widespread pockets of poverty and deprivation within the area, with areas such as Suffolk, Cambridgeshire and Norfolk being home to areas named among the most deprived in the country.

== Closing the gap ==
There have been various attempts to address the north–south divide, starting with foreign investment. An example of this is Nissan Motor Manufacturing UK opening at Sunderland in 1984, Hitachi opening in Newton Aycliffe in 2015, or Siemens Gamesa at Hull in 2017, manufacturing offshore wind turbine blades.

As of 2022 however, many Northern post-industrial cities and towns are experiencing a renaissance. Examples include Manchester, Kingston upon Hull, Leeds, Liverpool, Newcastle upon Tyne, Sheffield and the English Midlands cities of Birmingham, Coventry, Derby and Nottingham.

Manchester has benefited from the decentralisation of many BBC departments that produce TV and radio from London to Salford Quays in Greater Manchester. It has become the de facto digital hub city outside London for the UK, between 2012 and 2017 private equity investment in Manchester tech companies showed the fastest pace of growth in both volume and deal values in the EU – higher growth than cities such as London, Berlin, Paris and Stockholm. By 2018 there were an estimated 82,300 people working in digital in the Manchester city region – the largest cluster outside London and the city's stated ambition is to be recognised as one of Europe's top five digital cities by 2020. This cluster is reflected not only in BBC digital output but also the setup of the non-London UK-base for tech giants like Microsoft, Google and the open secret of around 1000 Amazon employees setting up near Piccadilly. Similarly, the decision in 2022 from Channel 4 to open its new Headquarter offices outside of London resulted in bids from various cities across the country, with Leeds prevailing as the destination for the move.

The Bank of England retain their only offices outside London in Leeds, which as well as strong big data and medical software specialisms, also hosts BT and Royal Mail's secondary communication centres for the UK. A strong gaming industry in Leeds has produced global titles. Typically Southern upmarket department stores and shops have located new stores in the north; these include Harvey Nichols (opening first in Leeds, then Manchester, followed by Birmingham) and Selfridges in the Trafford Centre in 1998, Manchester in 2002 and Birmingham in 2003. Exclusive shopping destinations such as Leeds' Victoria Quarter have led to the city being dubbed 'The Knightsbridge of the North'.

Bradford based supermarket Morrisons, which mainly operated in the North of England acquired 479 stores when it bought Safeway in 2004, the majority of these new supermarkets were in the south of England. Other Northern founded supermarkets such as Asda, Co-op Food and Marks & Spencer are also popular in the south of England.

Writer and DJ Stuart Maconie argues that "there is no south of England... There's a bottom half of England... but there isn't a south in the same way that there's a north". He goes on to state that "there's no conception of the south comparable to the north. Good or bad, 'the north' means something to all English people wherever they hail from... [to southerners] it means desolation, arctic temperatures, mushy peas, a cultural wasteland with limited shopping opportunities and populated by aggressive trolls. To northerners it means home, truth, beauty, valour, romance, warm and characterful people, real beer and decent chip shops. And in this we are undoubtedly biased, of course". This suggests that all people in England have biased views regarding the north–south divide. Maconie says regarding on where the North starts that "Crewe is surely the gateway to the North", suggesting that Crewe is the most southern part of the north of England.

=== Northern Powerhouse ===
In 2015, the UK government launched a strategy called the 'Northern Powerhouse' to help balance the influence and wealth of the south with the north. One proposal was the Northern Powerhouse Rail project, which included the construction of a high-speed rail service (HS2) between London and the north, upgrades to the Cheshire Lines Committee (CLC) route between Liverpool and Manchester and the Transpennine Route Upgrade . Further transport improvements listed were the Liverpool2 deep-water container port and the Mersey Gateway Bridge, designed to improve access to the port.

Other strategies include urban enterprise zones — as of 2022, there are 45 in England. Their goal is to encourage the establishment of new businesses by offering tax concessions, infrastructure incentives, and reduced regulations to attract investments and private companies, therefore creating jobs in areas without pre-existing businesses. The UK government supports businesses in enterprise zones by providing a business rate discount of up to £275,000 over a five-year period, granting financial allowances to businesses making large investments in plant and machinery, and granting simpler planning regulations to speed up the establishment of new businesses.

In addition, there is the strategy of local enterprise partnerships (LEPs), set up in England, 2011 by the Department for Business, Innovation and Skills to help identify local economic priorities and lead economic growth and job creation within local areas. By determining businesses' needs and encouraging companies to invest, jobs will be created, further boosting the economy. An example of this is the Lancashire LEP, formed in 2011 (following a period of factory closures and job losses due to deindustrialisation) with the goal of improving business growth and investment. As of 2021, Lancashire LEP has secured a £1 billion growth plan involving over 50 initiatives, such as £20 million funding for the Advanced Manufacturing Research Centre North West, and £17 million funding for the Lancaster Health Innovation Campus. All these are attempts at bridging the north–south divide.

== Similar divides in other countries ==
Several other European countries also have similar social and/or economic geographical divides such as in Belgium, the Netherlands, Germany, Italy and Poland.

== See also ==
- Danelaw
- Geography and identity in Wales
- Lloegyr
- London fiscal surplus
- M53 divide
- North Britain and South Britain
- North–South divide
- North–South divide (Wales)
- Northern Independence Party
- River Trent
- Stereotype
- Scottish Highlands and Scottish Lowlands
- Trap-bath split
- Solid North
