= Blackpool North =

Blackpool North may refer to:

- Blackpool North railway station, a railway station in Blackpool, Lancashire, England
- Blackpool North (UK Parliament constituency), a UK Parliament constituency from 1945 to 1997
- Blackpool North and Fleetwood (UK Parliament constituency), a UK Parliament constituency from 1997 to 2010
- Blackpool North and Cleveleys (UK Parliament constituency), a current UK Parliament constituency
