= Joan Humble =

British politician

Member of Parliament for Blackpool North and Fleetwood
- In office 1 May 1997 – 12 April 2010
- Preceded by: Constituency established
- Succeeded by: Constituency abolished

Personal details
- Born: Jovanka Piplica; 3 March 1951 (age 75) Skipton, West Riding of Yorkshire, England
- Party: Labour
- Spouse: Paul Humble
- Education: Lancaster University

Joan Humble (born Jovanka Piplica; 3 March 1951) is a British Labour Party politician, who was the Member of Parliament (MP) for Blackpool North and Fleetwood from 1997 to 2010.

== Early life ==
Humble's first job was working in a delicatessen. She was educated at Keighley Girls (now known as Greenhead High School) and Lancaster University where she received a BA degree in History in 1972. She worked as a civil servant in the Department of Health and Social Security from 1972, before moving to the Inland Revenue in 1973. She left the civil service in 1977 to raise her two daughters. She served as a school governor for fifteen years from 1982. In 1985, she was elected as a councillor to Lancashire County Council where she served until her election to Parliament.

== Parliamentary career ==
She was elected at the 1997 general election for the new Lancashire seat of Blackpool North and Fleetwood. She defeated Harold Elletson, the sitting Conservative MP for Blackpool North, by 8,946 votes. From 1998 to 2001 she served on select committees for social security, and from 2001 its replacement Work and Pensions. She was the chair of the All-Party Parliamentary Groups on Childcare, Social Care, Myodil & Army Deaths.

Although selected as the Labour Party candidate to contest the new constituency of Blackpool North and Cleveleys at the 2010 general election, Humble announced on 27 February 2010 that she would stand down at the election. At the election, the Conservative Paul Maynard won the seat on a 6.9% swing.

== Personal life ==
She married Paul Humble in 1972 in Halifax. She is a Christian socialist.

Parliament of the United Kingdom
New constituency	Member of Parliament for Blackpool North and Fleetwood; 1997–2010	Constituency abolished
