= Blackpool North and Fleetwood =

UK Parliament constituency (1997–2010, 2024 onwards)

Coordinates: 53.863°N 2.914°W

- Borough constituency for the House of Commons
- Interactive map of boundaries since 2024
- Location within North West England
- County: Lancashire
- Electorate: 75,396 (March 2020)

Current constituency
- Created: 2024
- Member of Parliament: Lorraine Beavers (Labour)
- Seats: One
- Created from: Blackpool North and Cleveleys, Lancaster and Fleetwood

1997–2010
- Created from: Wyre, Blackpool North
- Replaced by: Blackpool North and Cleveleys, Lancaster and Fleetwood

Blackpool North and Fleetwood is a parliamentary constituency represented in the House of Commons of the Parliament of the United Kingdom, electing one member of parliament (MP) by the first past the post system of election. Since its recreation following the 2023 review of Westminster constituencies for the 2024 general election the seat has been held by Lorraine Beavers of the Labour Party.

== Constituency profile ==
The constituency of Blackpool North and Fleetwood is located in Lancashire at the north-west corner of the Fylde, a peninsula on the Irish Sea coast. It contains the northern suburbs of the large seaside town of Blackpool, including Bispham, and other towns and villages to the north including Cleveleys, Thornton and Fleetwood.

The area was traditionally reliant on the fishing and tourism industries. Like many coastal towns in England, the area has experienced economic decline in recent decades. Compared to national averages, residents of the constituency are considerably older, more religious, more deprived and less likely to be degree-educated. White people make up 97% of the population.

Local politics are mixed; at the most recent local council elections in 2023, Bispham, Cleveleys and Thornton elected primarily Conservative councillors whilst the seats in Fleetwood were won by Labour Party candidates. Voters in the constituency were strongly in favour of leaving the European Union in the 2016 referendum, with an estimated 66% supporting Brexit.

== History ==
Blackpool is a unitary authority area but does not have enough electors to create two valid constituencies on its own without using electoral wards from other districts of Lancashire. Hence, this constituency was first created for the 1997 general election, containing the majority of the abolished Blackpool North constituency, together with the town of Fleetwood from the constituency of Wyre (also abolished). During its first creation, it was held by Joan Humble of the Labour Party.

The so-called "Golden Mile" of Blackpool and the fishing port of Fleetwood were paired in the seat. Those against the move at the time tried to argue that Fleetwood was a genteel place that had little, if anything, in common with its noisy neighbour to the south; then, as now, the Boundary Commission disagreed with the idea that Blackpool was a "den of vice", as one local Fleetwood newspaper claimed.

This seat was abolished for the 2010 general election, when Fleetwood was linked with Lancaster to create the new seat of Lancaster and Fleetwood. Meanwhile, the town of Thornton-Cleveleys was split to create Blackpool North and Cleveleys.

It was recreated in 2024 with boundaries similar to those of the 1997–2010 constituency and largely replaced the abolished Blackpool North and Cleveleys constituency.

== Boundaries ==
=== 1997–2010 ===
The Borough of Blackpool wards of Anchorsholme, Bispham, Claremont, Greenlands, Ingthorpe, Norbreck, and Warbreck, and the Borough of Wyre wards of Bailey, Bourne, Cleveleys Park, Jubilee, Mount, Park, Pharos, Rossall, Victoria, and Warren.

=== Current ===
Further to the 2023 boundary review, the composition of the reestablished constituency is as follows from the 2024 general election (as they existed on 1 December 2020):

- The Borough of Blackpool wards of: Anchorsholme; Bispham; Greenlands; Ingthorpe; Norbreck
- The District of Wyre wards of: Bourne; Carleton; Cleveleys Park; Jubilee; Marsh Mill; Mount; Park; Pharos; Pheasant's Wood; Rossall; Stanah; Victoria & Norcross; Warren

The constituency comprises the majority of, and replaces, the abolished constituency of Blackpool North and Cleveleys, extending northwards to include the town of Fleetwood from Lancaster and Fleetwood (also abolished). It was also expanded to include the whole of the Thornton-Cleveleys conurbation, together with the village of Carleton, formerly part of Wyre and Preston North (also abolished).

== Members of Parliament ==
Election	Member	Party
1997	Joan Humble	Labour
2010	constituency abolished	
2024	Lorraine Beavers	Labour

== Elections ==
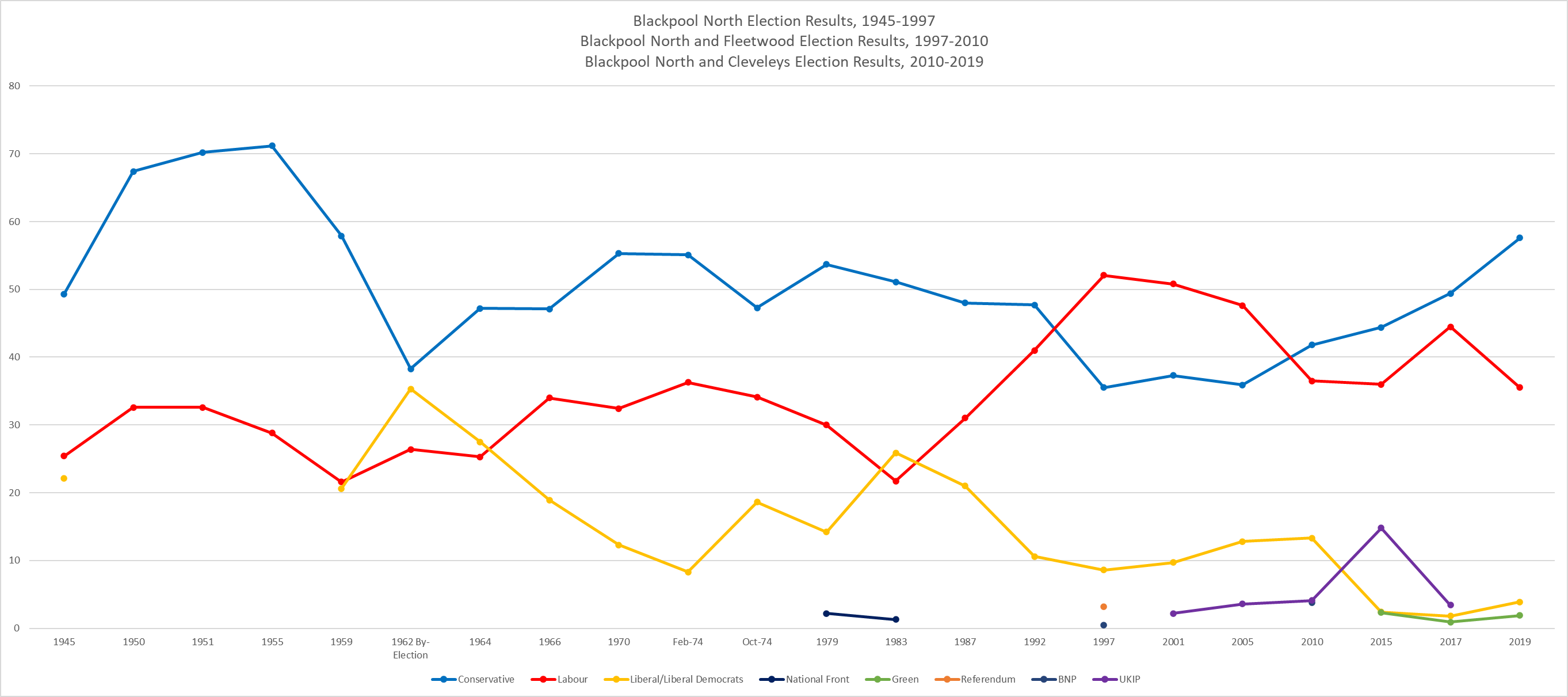
Blackpool North and Fleetwood election results

=== Elections in the 2020s ===
General election 2024: Blackpool North and Fleetwood
Party	Candidate	Votes	%	±%
Labour	Lorraine Beavers	16,744	40.0	+4.4
Conservative	Paul Maynard	12,097	28.9	−26.9
Reform	Dan Barker	9,913	23.7	+22.0
Liberal Democrats	Bill Greene	1,318	3.2	−0.8
Green	Tina Rothery	1,269	3.0	+1.1
Monster Raving Loony	James Rust	174	0.4	New
Independent	Gita Gordon	148	0.4	New
SDP	Jeannine Cresswell	147	0.4	New
Majority		4,647	11.1	N/A
Turnout		41,810	57.0	−9.4
Labour gain from Conservative		Swing	+15.6	

=== Elections in the 2000s ===
General election 2005: Blackpool North and Fleetwood
Party	Candidate	Votes	%	±%
Labour	Joan Humble	20,620	47.6	−3.2
Conservative	Gavin Williamson	15,558	35.9	−1.4
Liberal Democrats	Steven Bate	5,533	12.8	+3.1
UKIP	Roy Hopwood	1,579	3.6	+1.4
Majority		5,062	11.7	−1.8
Turnout		43,290	57.7	+0.5
Labour hold		Swing	−0.9	

General election 2001: Blackpool North & Fleetwood
Party	Candidate	Votes	%	±%
Labour	Joan Humble	21,610	50.8	−1.3
Conservative	Alan Vincent	15,889	37.3	+1.8
Liberal Democrats	Steven Bate	4,132	9.7	+1.1
UKIP	Colin Porter	950	2.2	New
Majority		5,721	13.5	−3.1
Turnout		42,581	57.2	−14.5
Labour hold		Swing	−1.6	

=== Elections in the 1990s ===
General election 1997: Blackpool North and Fleetwood
Party	Candidate	Votes	%	±%
Labour	Joan Humble	28,051	52.1	
Conservative	Harold Elletson	19,105	35.5	
Liberal Democrats	Beverley Hill	4,600	8.6	
Referendum	Roy Hopwood	1,704	3.2	
BNP	Jon Ellis	288	0.5	
Majority		8,946	16.6	N/A
Turnout		53,748	71.7	
Labour gain from Conservative		Swing		

== See also ==
- Parliamentary constituencies in Lancashire
