= Blackpool North and Cleveleys =

UK Parliament constituency (2010–2024)

Coordinates: 53.863°N 2.914°W

- Former borough constituency for the House of Commons
- Boundary of Blackpool North and Cleveleys in Lancashire for the 2010 general election

- Location of Lancashire within England
- County: Lancashire
- Population: 83,391 (2011 census)
- Electorate: 62,697 (December 2018)
- Major settlements: Blackpool, Layton

2010–2024
- Created from: Blackpool North and Fleetwood

Blackpool North and Cleveleys was a constituency (Note: A borough constituency (for the purposes of election expenses and type of returning officer)) represented in the House of Commons of the UK Parliament since 2010 by Paul Maynard, a Conservative. (Note: As with all constituencies, the constituency elects one Member of Parliament (MP) by the first past the post system of election at least every five years.)

Further to the completion of the 2023 Periodic Review of Westminster constituencies, the seat will be subject to major boundary changes, with four Borough of Blackpool wards being transferred to an expanded Blackpool South. To compensate, the constituency will take in the rest of the Thornton-Cleveleys conurbation, as well as the town of Fleetwood to the north. As a consequence, the constituency reverted to Blackpool North and Fleetwood for the 2024 general election.

== Constituency profile ==
The seat covered residential suburbs of the seaside town of Blackpool, and the Thornton-Cleveleys conurbation further north. Residents are slightly less wealthy than the UK average.

== History ==
The seat was created by the Boundary Commission for England following its review of parliamentary representation in Lancashire.

== Boundaries ==
Map of boundaries 2010-2024

The Borough of Blackpool wards of Anchorsholme, Bispham, Claremont, Greenlands, Ingthorpe, Layton, Norbreck, Park, and Warbreck, and the Borough of Wyre wards of Bourne, Cleveleys Park, Jubilee, and Victoria.

Following the 2010 review of parliamentary boundaries, the previous seat of Blackpool North and Fleetwood was abolished. The new seat connects Blackpool's northern half with Cleveleys in Wyre.

From the 2024 general election the seat will return to a modified version of Blackpool North and Fleetwood, covering the following electoral wards:

- From Blackpool: Anchorsholme, Bispham, Greenlands, Ingthorpe, Norbreck
- From Wyre: Bourne, Carleton, Cleveleys Park, Jubilee, Marsh Mill, Mount Park, Pharos, Pheasant's Wood, Rossall, Stanah, Victoria & Norcross, Warren

== Members of Parliament ==
Election	Member	Party
2010	Paul Maynard	Conservative

== Elections ==
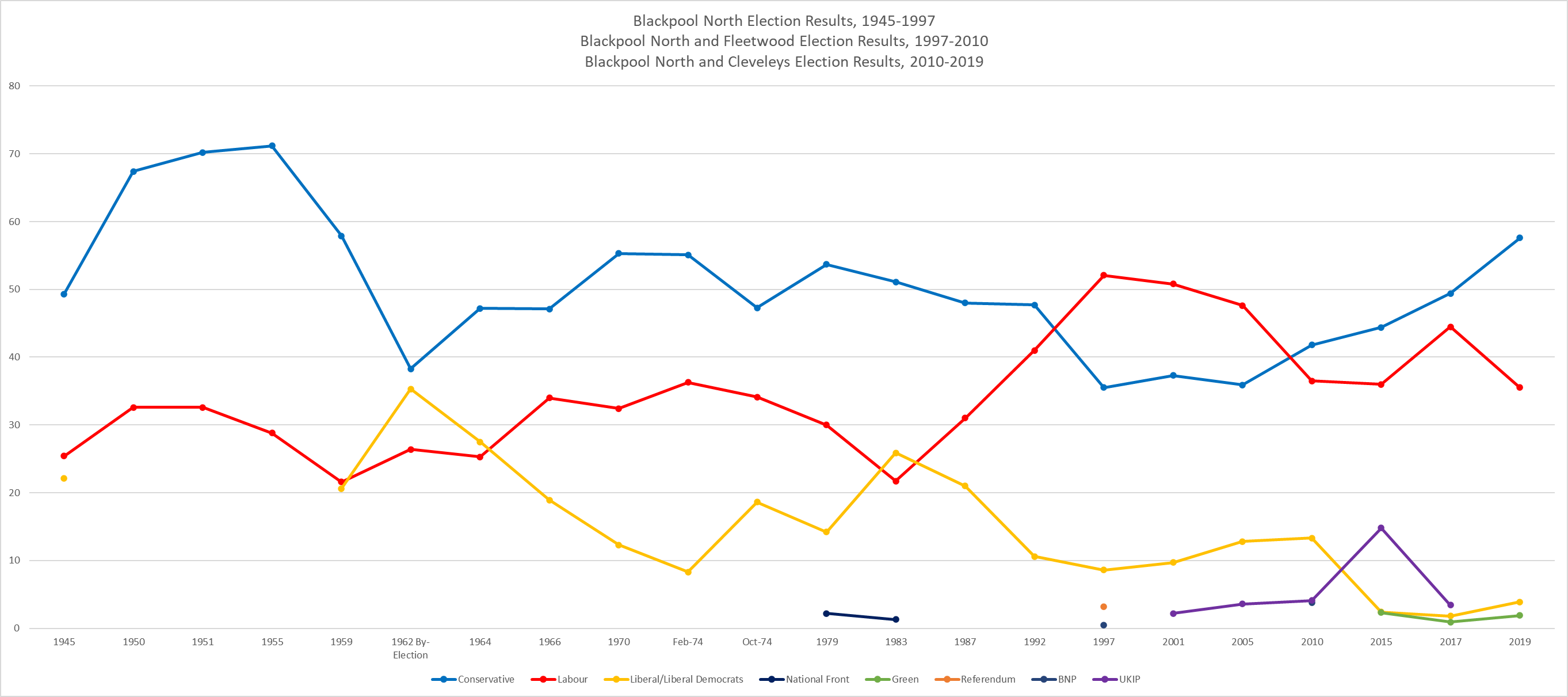
Blackpool North and Cleveleys Election Results

=== Elections in the 2010s ===
General election 2019: Blackpool North and Cleveleys
Party	Candidate	Votes	%	±%
Conservative	Paul Maynard	22,364	57.6	+8.2
Labour	Chris Webb	13,768	35.5	−9.0
Liberal Democrats	Sue Close	1,494	3.9	+2.1
Green	Duncan Royle	735	1.9	+1.0
Independent	Neil Holden	443	1.1	New
Majority		8,596	22.1	+17.2
Turnout		38,804	60.9	−3.2
Conservative hold		Swing	+8.6	

General election 2017: Blackpool North and Cleveleys
Party	Candidate	Votes	%	±%
Conservative	Paul Maynard	20,255	49.4	+5.0
Labour	Chris Webb	18,232	44.5	+8.5
UKIP	Paul White	1,392	3.4	−11.4
Liberal Democrats	Sue Close	747	1.8	−0.6
Green	Duncan Royle	381	0.9	−1.4
Majority		2,023	4.9	−3.5
Turnout		41,007	64.1	+1.0
Conservative hold		Swing	−1.8	

General election 2015: Blackpool North and Cleveleys
Party	Candidate	Votes	%	±%
Conservative	Paul Maynard	17,508	44.4	+2.6
Labour	Sam Rushworth	14,168	36.0	−0.5
UKIP	Simon Noble	5,823	14.8	+10.7
Liberal Democrats	Sue Close	948	2.4	−10.9
Green	John Warnock	889	2.3	New
Northern	James Walsh	57	0.1	New
Majority		3,340	8.4	+3.1
Turnout		39,393	63.1	+1.5
Conservative hold		Swing	+1.6	

General election 2010: Blackpool North and Cleveleys
Party	Candidate	Votes	%	±%
Conservative	Paul Maynard	16,964	41.8	+4.5
Labour	Penny Martin	14,814	36.5	−9.2
Liberal Democrats	Bill Greene	5,400	13.3	−0.4
UKIP	Roy Hopwood	1,659	4.1	+0.7
BNP	James Clayton	1,556	3.8	New
Monster Raving Loony	Tony Davies	198	0.5	New
Majority		2,150	5.3	N/A
Turnout		40,591	61.6	+4.0
Conservative gain from Labour		Swing	+6.9	

== See also ==
- List of parliamentary constituencies in Lancashire
