= Marginal constituencies in the 2010 United Kingdom general election =

This is a list of marginal seats in the United Kingdom after the results in the 2010 general election.

== Most marginal constituencies ==
Ten most marginal seats (by majority) from the 2010 general election.

Rank	Constituency	MP Elected	First place party	Second place party	Majority	%
1	Fermanagh and South Tyrone	Michelle Gildernew	Sinn Féin	Independent	4	0.0%
2	Hampstead and Kilburn	Glenda Jackson	Labour	Conservative	42	0.1%
3	North Warwickshire	Dan Byles	Conservative	Labour	54	0.1%
4	Camborne and Redruth	George Eustice	Conservative	Liberal Democrats	66	0.2%
5	Bolton West	Julie Hilling	Labour	Conservative	92	0.2%
5	Thurrock	Jackie Doyle-Price	Conservative	Labour	92	0.2%
7	Oldham East and Saddleworth*	Phil Woolas	Labour	Liberal Democrats	103	0.2%
8	Hendon	Matthew Offord	Conservative	Labour	106	0.2%
9	Sheffield Central	Paul Blomfield	Labour	Liberal Democrats	165	0.4%
10	Solihull	Lorely Burt	Liberal Democrats	Conservative	175	0.3%

== Conservative marginals ==
=== Conservative - Labour marginals ===
Conservative	Labour

Constituencies where the Conservative Party holds a marginal lead over the Labour Party:

Rank	Constituency	MP Elected	Majority	%
1	North Warwickshire	Dan Byles	54	0.1%
2	Thurrock	Jackie Doyle-Price	92	0.2%
3	Hendon	Matthew Offord	106	0.2%
4	Cardiff North	Jonathan Evans	194	0.4%
5	Sherwood	Mark Spencer	214	0.4%
6	Stockton South	James Wharton	332	0.7%
7	Lancaster and Fleetwood	Eric Ollerenshaw	333	0.8%
8	Broxtowe	Anna Soubry	389	0.7%
9	Amber Valley	Nigel Mills	536	1.2%
10	Wolverhampton South West	Paul Uppal	691	1.7%
11	Waveney	Peter Aldous	769	1.5%
12	Carlisle	John Stevenson	853	2.0%
13	Morecambe and Lunesdale	David Morris	866	2.0%
14	Weaver Vale	Graham Evans	991	2.3%
15	Lincoln	Karl McCartney	1,058	2.3%
16	Plymouth Sutton and Devonport	Oliver Colvile	1,149	2.6%
17	Stroud	Neil Carmichael	1,299	2.2%
18	Brighton Kemptown	Simon Kirby	1,328	3.1%
19	Bedford	Richard Fuller	1,353	3.0%
20	Dewsbury	Simon Reevell	1,526	2.8%
21	Keighley	Kris Hopkins	2,940	6.2%
22	Worcester	Robin Walker	2,982	6.1%
23	Cannock Chase	Aidan Burley	3,195	7.0%
24	Aberconwy	Guto Bebb	3,398	11.3%
25	Harrow East	Bob Blackman	3,403	7.1%
26	Carmarthen West and South Pembrokeshire	Simon Hart	3,423	8.5%
27	Warwick and Leamington	Chris White	3,513	7.2%
28	South Swindon	Robert Buckland	3,544	7.5%
29	Stevenage	Stephen McPartland	3,578	8.0%
30	Pendle	Andrew Stephenson	3,585	8.0%
31	Ealing Central and Acton	Angie Bray	3,716	7.9%
32	Loughborough	Nicky Morgan	3,744	7.1%
33	Dudley South	Chris Kelly	3,856	10.1%
34	Norwich North	Chloe Smith	3,901	9.2%
35	Dumfriesshire, Clydesdale and Tweeddale	David Mundell	4,194	9.1%
36	Great Yarmouth	Brandon Lewis	4,276	9.9%
37	Cleethorpes	Martin Vickers	4,298	9.6%
38	Vale of Glamorgan	Alun Cairns	4,307	8.8%
39	Rossendale and Darwen	Jake Berry	4,493	9.5%
40	Elmet and Rothwell	Alec Shelbrooke	4,521	8.1%
41	Preseli Pembrokeshire	Stephen Crabb	4,605	11.6%
42	High Peak	Andrew Bingham	4,677	9.3%
43	Peterborough	Stewart Jackson	4,861	10.8%
44	North East Somerset	Jacob Rees-Mogg	4,914	9.6%
45	Harlow	Robert Halfon	4,925	11.2%

=== Conservative - Liberal Democrat marginals ===
Conservative	Liberal Democrats

Constituencies where the Conservative Party holds a marginal lead over the Liberal Democrats:

Rank	Constituency	MP Elected	Majority	%
1	Camborne and Redruth	George Eustice	66	0.2%
2	Oxford West and Abingdon	Nicola Blackwood	176	0.3%
3	Truro and Falmouth	Sarah Newton	435	0.9%
4	Newton Abbot	Anne Marie Morris	523	1.1%
5	Harrogate and Knaresborough	Andrew Jones	1,039	2.0%
6	Montgomeryshire	Glyn Davies	1,184	3.5%
7	Watford	Richard Harrington	1,425	2.6%
8	St Albans	Anne Main	2,305	4.4%
9	Hereford and South Herefordshire	Jesse Norman	2,481	5.1%
10	Weston-super-Mare	John Penrose	2,691	5.1%
11	Torridge and West Devon	Geoffrey Cox	2,957	5.4%
12	Winchester	Steve Brine	3,048	5.4%
13	South East Cornwall	Sheryll Murray	3,220	6.5%
14	Bristol North West	Charlotte Leslie	3,274	6.5%
15	York Outer	Julian Sturdy	3,688	6.9%
16	West Dorset	Oliver Letwin	3,923	6.8%
17	Richmond Park	Zac Goldsmith	4,091	6.9%
18	Romsey and Southampton North	Caroline Nokes	4,156	8.5%
19	Colne Valley	Jason McCartney	4,837	8.7%
20	Totnes	Sarah Wollaston	4,927	10.3%

=== Other Conservative marginals ===
Constituencies where the Conservative Party holds a marginal lead over another party:

Constituency	MP Elected	First Party	Second Party	Majority	%
Wyre Forest	Mark Garnier	Conservative	Health Concern	2,643	5.2%

== Liberal Democrat marginals ==
=== Liberal Democrat - Conservative marginals ===
Liberal Democrats	Conservative

Constituencies where the Liberal Democrats holds a marginal lead over the Conservative Party:

Rank	Constituency	MP Elected	Majority	%
1	Solihull	Lorely Burt	175	0.3%
2	Mid Dorset and North Poole	Annette Brooke	269	0.6%
3	Wells	Tessa Munt	800	1.4%
4	St Austell and Newquay	Stephen Gilbert	1,312	2.8%
5	Sutton and Cheam	Paul Burstow	1,608	3.3%
6	St Ives	Andrew George	1,719	3.7%
7	Somerton and Frome	David Heath	1,817	3.0%
8	Chippenham	Duncan Hames	2,470	4.7%
9	Berwick-upon-Tweed	Alan Beith	2,690	7.0%
10	North Cornwall	Dan Rogerson	2,981	6.4%
11	Cheadle	Mark Hunter	3,272	6.2%
12	Argyll and Bute	Alan Reid	3,431	7.6%
13	Eastbourne	Stephen Lloyd	3,435	6.6%
14	West Aberdeenshire and Kincardine	Robert Smith	3,684	8.2%
15	Brecon and Radnorshire	Roger Williams	3,747	9.6%
16	Eastleigh	Chris Huhne	3,864	7.2%
17	Taunton Deane	Jeremy Browne	3,993	6.9%
18	Torbay	Adrian Sanders	4,078	8.3%
19	Cheltenham	Martin Horwood	4,920	9.3%

=== Liberal Democrat - Labour marginals ===
Liberal Democrats	Labour

Constituencies where the Liberal Democrats holds a marginal lead over the Labour Party:

Rank	Constituency	MP Elected	Majority	%
1	Norwich South	Simon Wright	310	0.7%
2	Bradford East	David Ward	365	0.9%
3	Brent Central	Sarah Teather	1,345	3.0%
4	Burnley	Gordon Birtwistle	1,818	4.3%
5	Manchester Withington	John Leech	1,894	4.2%
6	East Dunbartonshire	Jo Swinson	2,184	4.6%
7	Birmingham Yardley	John Hemming	3,002	7.3%
8	Edinburgh West	Mike Crockart	3,803	8.2%
9	Cardiff Central	Jenny Willott	4,576	12.7%
10	Caithness, Sutherland and Easter Ross	John Thurso	4,826	16.8%

== Labour marginals ==
=== Labour - Conservative marginals ===
Labour	Conservative

Constituencies where the Labour Party holds a marginal lead over the Conservative Party:

Rank	Constituency	MP Elected	Majority	%
1	Hampstead and Kilburn	Glenda Jackson	42	0.1%
2	Bolton West	Julie Hilling	92	0.2%
3	Southampton Itchen	John Denham	192	0.4%
4	Wirral South	Alison McGovern	531	1.3%
5	Derby North	Chris Williamson	613	1.4%
6	Dudley North	Ian Austin	649	1.7%
7	Great Grimsby	Austin Mitchell	714	2.2%
8	Telford	David Wright	978	2.4%
9	Walsall North	David Winnick	990	2.7%
10	Morley and Outwood	Ed Balls	1,101	2.3%
11	Birmingham Edgbaston	Gisela Stuart	1,274	3.1%
12	Halifax	Linda Riordan	1,472	3.4%
13	Newcastle-under-Lyme	Paul Farrelly	1,552	3.6%
14	Plymouth Moor View	Alison Seabeck	1,588	3.8%
15	Wakefield	Mary Creagh	1,613	3.6%
16	Eltham	Clive Efford	1,663	4.0%
17	Middlesbrough South and East Cleveland	Tom Blenkinsop	1,677	3.6%
18	Walsall South	Valerie Vaz	1,755	4.3%
19	Nottingham South	Lilian Greenwood	1,772	4.3%
20	Blackpool South	Gordon Marsden	1,852	5.3%
21	Gedling	Vernon Coaker	1,859	3.9%
22	Westminster North	Karen Buck	2,126	5.4%
23	Bridgend	Madeleine Moon	2,263	5.9%
24	Delyn	David Hanson	2,272	6.1%
25	Luton South	Gavin Shuker	2,329	5.5%
26	Southampton Test	Alan Whitehead	2,413	5.5%
27	North East Derbyshire	Natascha Engel	2,445	5.2%
28	Wolverhampton North East	Emma Reynolds	2,484	7.1%
29	Vale of Clwyd	Chris Ruane	2,509	7.1%
30	Tooting	Sadiq Khan	2,524	5.0%
31	Scunthorpe	Nic Dakin	2,549	6.9%
32	Chorley	Lindsay Hoyle	2,593	5.2%
33	Dagenham and Rainham	Jon Cruddas	2,630	5.9%
34	Gower	Martin Caton	2,683	6.4%
35	Exeter	Ben Bradshaw	2,721	5.2%
36	Stalybridge and Hyde	Jonathan Reynolds	2,744	6.7%
37	Birmingham Northfield	Richard Burden	2,782	6.7%
38	Clwyd South	Susan Elan Jones	2,834	8.2%
39	Alyn and Deeside	Mark Tami	2,919	7.3%
40	Penistone and Stocksbridge	Angela Smith	3,049	6.6%
41	Hyndburn	Graham Jones	3,090	7.2%
42	Harrow West	Gareth Thomas	3,143	6.8%
43	Birmingham Erdington	Jack Dromey	3,277	9.2%
44	Bury South	Ivan Lewis	3,292	6.8%
45	Darlington	Jenny Chapman	3,388	7.9%
46	Birmingham Selly Oak	Steve McCabe	3,482	7.5%
47	Newport West	Paul Flynn	3,544	8.9%
48	Hammersmith	Andy Slaughter	3,549	7.5%
49	Don Valley	Caroline Flint	3,595	8.3%
50	Bristol East	Kerry McCarthy	3,722	8.3%
51	Copeland	Jamie Reed	3,833	9.0%
52	Coventry South	Jim Cunningham	3,845	8.4%
53	Sefton Central	Bill Esterson	3,862	8.0%
54	Leicester West	Liz Kendall	4,017	11.2%
55	Bolton North East	David Crausby	4,084	9.4%
56	Stoke-on-Trent South	Rob Flello	4,130	10.4%
57	Ellesmere Port and Neston	Andrew Miller	4,331	9.8%
58	Worsley and Eccles South	Barbara Keeley	4,337	10.4%
59	West Lancashire	Rosie Cooper	4,343	9.0%
60	Batley and Spen	Mike Wood	4,406	8.6%
61	Huddersfield	Barry Sheerman	4,472	11.0%
62	Leeds North East	Fabian Hamilton	4,545	9.6%
63	Workington	Tony Cunningham	4,575	11.7%
64	Bradford South	Gerry Sutcliffe	4,622	12.2%
65	Feltham and Heston*	Alan Keen	4,658	9.6%
66	Cardiff South and Penarth*	Alun Michael	4,709	10.6%
67	Cardiff West	Kevin Brennan	4,751	11.6%

=== Labour - Liberal Democrat marginals ===
Labour	Liberal Democrats

Constituencies where the Labour Party holds a marginal lead over the Liberal Democrats:

Rank	Constituency	MP Elected	Majority	%
1	Oldham East and Saddleworth*	Phil Woolas	103	0.2%
2	Sheffield Central	Paul Blomfield	165	0.4%
3	Ashfield	Gloria De Piero	192	0.4%
4	Edinburgh South	Ian Murray	316	0.7%
5	Swansea West	Geraint Davies	504	1.4%
6	Chesterfield	Toby Perkins	549	1.2%
7	Kingston upon Hull North	Diana Johnson	641	1.9%
8	Rochdale	Simon Danczuk	889	1.9%
9	Newport East	Jessica Morden	1,650	4.8%
10	Edinburgh North and Leith	Mark Lazarowicz	1,724	3.6%
11	Pontypridd	Owen Smith	2,785	7.6%
12	City of Durham	Roberta Blackman-Woods	3,067	6.6%
13	Streatham	Chuka Umunna	3,259	7.0%
14	Newcastle upon Tyne NortH	Catherine McKinnell	3,414	7.8%
15	Aberdeen South	Anne Begg	3,506	8.1%
16	Islington South and Finsbury	Emily Thornberry	3,569	8.2%
17	Wrexham	Ian Lucas	3,658	11.1%
18	Glasgow North	Ann McKechin	3,898	13.2%
19	Merthyr Tydfil and Rhymney	Dai Havard	4,056	12.6%
20	Newcastle upon Tyne East	Nick Brown	4,453	11.8%
21	Oxford East	Andrew Smith	4,581	8.9%
22	Bristol South	Dawn Primarolo	4,734	9.8%

=== Other Labour marginals ===
Constituencies where the Labour Party holds a marginal lead over another party:

Rank	Constituency	MP Elected	First Party	Second Party	Majority	%
1	Ynys Môn	Albert Owen	Labour	Plaid Cymru	2,461	7.1%
2	Birmingham Hall Green	Roger Godsiff	Labour	Respect	3,799	7.8%
3	Llanelli	Nia Griffith	Labour	Plaid Cymru	4,701	12.5%

== Other Parties ==
Other Parties marginal seats by majority:

=== Alliance Party ===
Constituency	MP Elected	First Party	Second Party	Majority	%
Belfast East	Naomi Long	Alliance	DUP	1,533	4.4%

=== Democratic Unionist Party ===
Constituency	MP Elected	First Party	Second Party	Majority	%
South Antrim	William McCrea	DUP	UCU	1,183	3.5%
Belfast North	Nigel Dodds	DUP	Sinn Féin	2,224	6.0%
Upper Bann	David Simpson	DUP	UCU	3,361	8.1%

=== Green Party ===
Constituency	MP Elected	First Party	Second Party	Majority	%
Brighton Pavilion	Caroline Lucas	Green	Labour	1,252	2.4%

=== Plaid Cymru ===
Constituency	MP Elected	First Party	Second Party	Majority	%
Arfon	Hywel Williams	Plaid Cymru	Labour	1,455	5.6%
Carmarthen East and Dinefwr	Jonathan Edwards	Plaid Cymru	Labour	3,481	9.2%

=== Social Democratic Labour Party ===
Constituency	MP Elected	First Party	Second Party	Majority	%
Foyle	Mark Durkan	SDLP	Sinn Féin	4,824	12.7%

=== Sinn Fein ===
Constituency	MP Elected	First Party	Second Party	Majority	%
Fermanagh and South Tyrone	Michelle Gildernew	Sinn Féin	Independent	4	0.0%

=== Scottish National Party ===
Rank	Constituency	MP Elected	First Party	Second Party	Majority	%
1	Dundee East	Stewart Hosie	SNP	Labour	1,821	4.5%
2	Na h-Eileanan an Iar	Angus MacNeil	SNP	Labour	1,885	12.8%
3	Angus	Mike Weir	SNP	Conservative	3,282	8.6%
4	Banff and Buchan	Eilidh Whiteford	SNP	Conservative	4,027	10.5%
5	Perth and North Perthshire	Pete Wishart	SNP	Conservative	4,379	9.1%

== See also ==
- Marginal constituencies in the 2005 United Kingdom general election
- List of marginal seats before the 2015 United Kingdom general election
- List of marginal seats before the 2017 United Kingdom general election
- List of marginal seats before the 2019 United Kingdom general election
- List of marginal seats before the 2024 United Kingdom general election
