= Ben Wallace (politician) =

British Conservative politician (born 1970)

The Right Honourable Sir Ben Wallace KCB
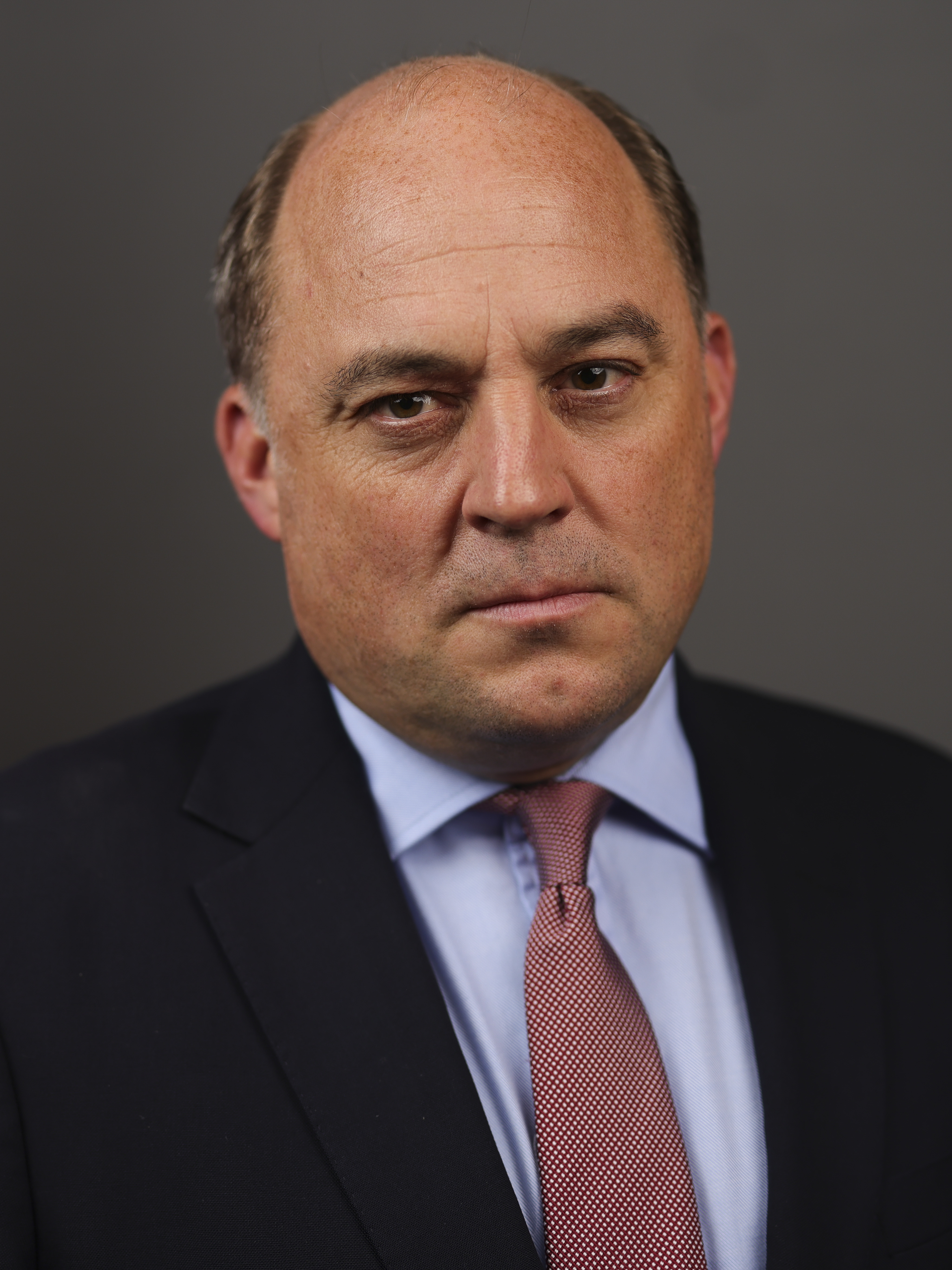
- Official portrait, 2022

Secretary of State for Defence
- In office 24 July 2019 – 31 August 2023
- Prime Minister: Boris Johnson; Liz Truss; Rishi Sunak
- Preceded by: Penny Mordaunt
- Succeeded by: Grant Shapps

Minister of State for Security and Economic Crime
- In office 17 July 2016 – 24 July 2019
- Prime Minister: Theresa May
- Preceded by: John Hayes
- Succeeded by: Brandon Lewis

Parliamentary Under-Secretary of State for Northern Ireland
- In office 12 May 2015 – 17 July 2016
- Prime Minister: David Cameron
- Preceded by: Andrew Murrison
- Succeeded by: Kris Hopkins

Member of Parliament for Wyre and Preston North Lancaster and Wyre (2005–2010)
- In office 5 May 2005 – 30 May 2024
- Preceded by: Hilton Dawson
- Succeeded by: Constituency abolished

Member of the Scottish Parliament for North East Scotland (1 of 7 Regional MSPs)
- In office 6 May 1999 – 31 March 2003

Personal details
- Born: Robert Ben Lobban Wallace; 15 May 1970 (age 56) Farnborough, Greater London, England
- Party: Conservative
- Spouse: Liza Cooke (m. 2001)
- Children: 3
- Education: Millfield School; Royal Military Academy Sandhurst
- Website: benwallace.org.uk

Military service
- Allegiance: United Kingdom
- Branch/service: British Army
- Years of service: 1991–1998
- Rank: Captain
- Unit: Scots Guards
- Battles/wars: The Troubles
- Awards: Mentioned in dispatches
- Ben Wallace's voice Wallace opens a panel of defence ministers at the 2020 Conservative Party Conference. Recorded 5 October 2020

Sir Robert Ben Lobban Wallace (born 15 May 1970) is a British politician and former military officer who served as Secretary of State for Defence from 2019 to 2023. A member of the Conservative Party, he was the Member of Parliament (MP) for Wyre and Preston North, formerly Lancaster and Wyre, from 2005 to 2024.

Before becoming involved in politics, Wallace was a captain in the Scots Guards. He was elected in 1999 as a Conservative list Member of the Scottish Parliament (MSP) for North East Scotland, serving until 2003. He subsequently resigned from the Scottish Parliament, moved to Lancashire and sought selection for a Westminster constituency in England. First elected to the UK Parliament in 2005, Wallace served as a backbencher for nearly five years. From 2010 to 2014, he was Parliamentary Private Secretary to the then Secretary of State for Justice, Ken Clarke. Wallace served as a party whip from July 2014 to May 2015.

Following the 2015 general election and the formation of the majority Cameron government, he became Parliamentary Under-Secretary of State in the Northern Ireland Office. In 2016, he was appointed Minister of State for Security and Economic Crime by Theresa May, holding the position until she left office in July 2019. A supporter of Boris Johnson, Wallace was promoted to Secretary of State for Defence after Johnson became prime minister. He continued the role under Liz Truss and Rishi Sunak, making him the longest-serving member of the Cabinet to serve continuously in the same position until he left office.

In July 2023, Wallace announced that he intended to resign as Secretary of State for Defence at the next Cabinet reshuffle and that he would not be seeking re-election as an MP at the 2024 general election. In August 2023, Wallace formally resigned as Secretary of State for Defence.

== Early life ==
Wallace was born on 15 May 1970 in Farnborough, in the London Borough of Bromley. His father served in the 1st King's Dragoon Guards and was posted in Malaya, whilst his mother was an art teacher, and artist.

Wallace was educated at Millfield, a private school in Somerset. While at school, he attended a young officers' course for the Royal Scots Dragoon Guards, and after leaving school was interviewed by the Regular Commissions Board. He then spent some time as a ski instructor at the Austrian National Ski School in the village of Alpbach in Austria.

== Military career ==
After training as a cadet at the Royal Military Academy Sandhurst, in June 1991 Wallace was commissioned into the Scots Guards as a second lieutenant, with a short service commission. From 1991 to 1998, he served in Germany, Cyprus, Belize, and Northern Ireland. In April 1993, he was promoted lieutenant, and later that year was mentioned in dispatches for an incident in Belfast where the patrol he was commanding captured an entire IRA active service unit (ASU) attempting to carry out a bomb attack against British troops. The Police Service of Northern Ireland (PSNI) later said that no one arrested as a result of the patrol was prosecuted. In 1996, he was promoted captain.

Wallace was on duty on the night of the death of Diana, Princess of Wales, and was a member of the party sent to Paris to bring home her body.

In June 1998, Wallace transferred from the Active List to the Regular Army Reserve of Officers as a captain, thereby ending his active service and beginning a period of call-up liability. He later explained that he had decided against seeking to become a regular officer and to continue after the age of thirty, as the part of the work he had enjoyed was commanding soldiers, and this was likely to diminish after that point.

Wallace is a member of the Royal Company of Archers, a ceremonial unit that serves as the Sovereign's bodyguard in Scotland. As such, he participated in the vigil over the Queen's coffin as she lay in state in Westminster Hall on 15 September 2022.

== Political career ==
=== Scottish Parliament ===
Wallace entered politics after leaving the army, citing as a reason for this decision the experience he had commanding men from some of the UK's most economically deprived areas, which he averred could be improved by promoting a more aspirational society. Wallace became a Conservative Member of the Scottish Parliament in 1999, as a list MSP for North East Scotland. He did not seek re-election at the 2003 Scottish Parliament election, as he sought selection for a Westminster constituency in England. Wallace was the Scottish Conservatives' shadow health spokesman during that time.

From 2003 to 2005, he was overseas director of the aerospace company QinetiQ, the UK's former Defence Evaluation and Research Agency (DERA).

=== Member of UK Parliament ===
Wallace was elected as Member of Parliament for the Lancaster and Wyre constituency at the 2005 general election. He gained the seat from Labour with 22,266 votes and a majority of 4,171 (8.0%). Wallace faced local criticism after it was revealed that in 2008 he had made the fourth-highest expenses claim of any MP, claiming £175,523 on top of his £63,000 salary. However, he defended this by arguing that his constituency had an electorate that was nearly 20% larger than the average one in England.

His constituency was abolished for the 2010 UK general election, and Wallace was instead returned for the new seat of Wyre and Preston North with 26,877 votes and a majority of 15,844 (30.9%). He was re-elected at the 2015, 2017, and 2019 UK general elections, with majorities suggesting he now held a safe seat for his party.

From 2005 to 2010, Wallace was a member of the Scottish Affairs Select Committee of the House of Commons. From 2006 to 2010, he was also the Shadow Minister of State for Scotland and was Chairman of the British–Iran Parliamentary Group from 2006 to 2014. He was awarded Campaigner of the Year in the annual Spectator/Threadneedle Parliamentarian Awards in 2008, for his work promoting transparency of MPs' expenses.

=== Junior ministerial roles and EU referendum ===
Following his re-election to Parliament in 2010, Wallace was appointed as parliamentary private secretary (PPS) to the then Justice Secretary and Lord Chancellor, and later minister without portfolio in the Cabinet Office, Kenneth Clarke. On 4 September 2012, Wallace turned down a position as a government whip during the cabinet reshuffle to remain Clarke's PPS. He voted against the Marriage (Same Sex Couples) Act 2013, which legalised same-sex marriage in England and Wales. In July 2014, as Clarke returned to the back benches, Wallace was again offered a job in Government as a whip. This time he accepted. Also in 2014, he became an early supporter of a future leadership bid by Boris Johnson, who was not then in parliament.

In May 2015, Wallace was promoted to Parliamentary Under-Secretary of State in the Northern Ireland Office. Early in 2016, with the approach of the European Union referendum, Boris Johnson was wavering between Leave and Remain, and Wallace advised him strongly to support Remain, as taking the Leave side would mean being allied with "clowns". Wallace himself supported the Remain side before the referendum.

After Leave had won the referendum, David Cameron resigned as party leader. The new Prime Minister Theresa May promoted Wallace to Minister of State for Security in the Home Office. He voted for her Brexit withdrawal agreement in early 2019, and against any referendum on that agreement. In December 2017, Wallace's ministerial portfolio was extended to include economic crime. He was Security Minister during the terror attacks of 2017 and the attempted assassination of Sergei Skripal in Salisbury. Wallace was appointed to the Privy Council for his role in coordinating the government response to the 2017 Westminster attack.

=== Secretary of State for Defence ===
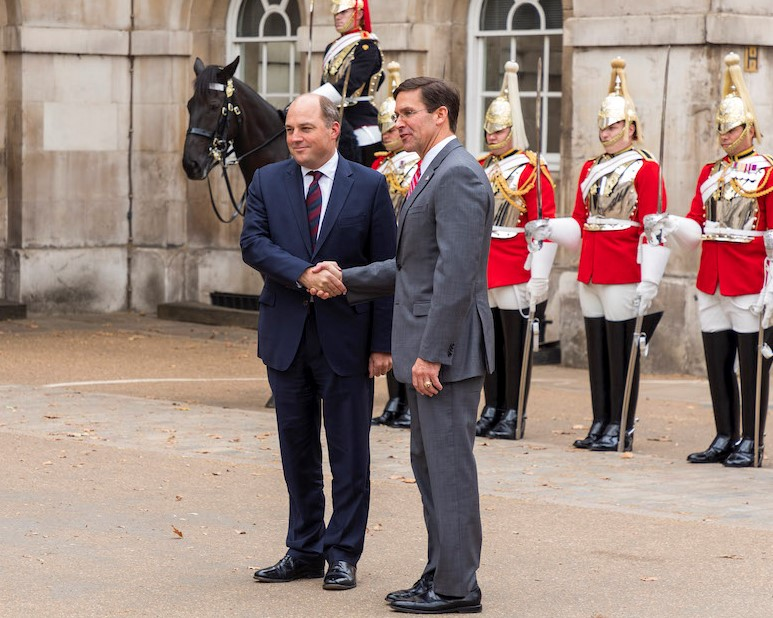
Wallace (left) meeting with the United States Secretary of Defense Mark Esper at Horse Guards in September 2019

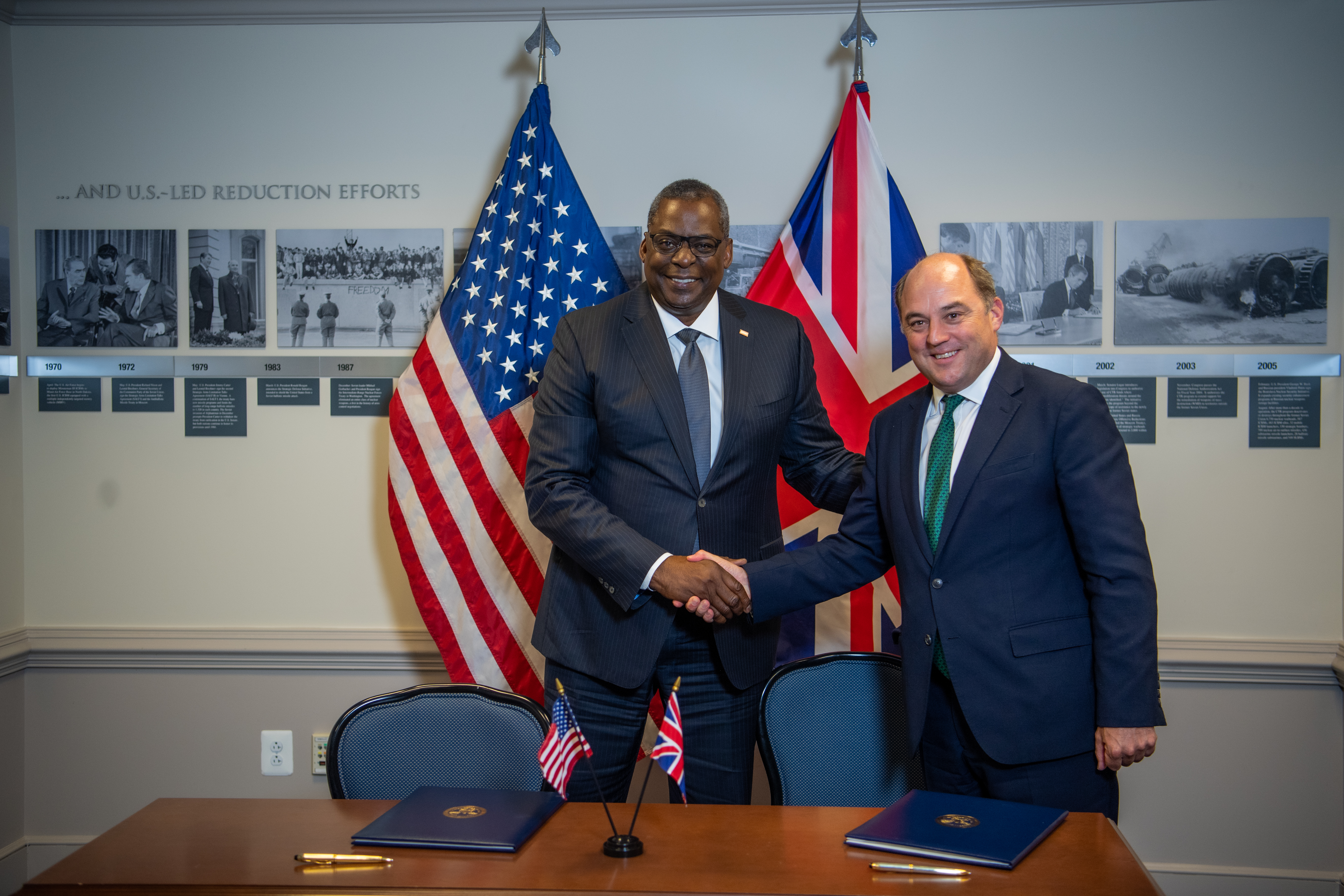
Wallace (right) and US Secretary of Defense Lloyd Austin at the Pentagon, in July 2021

On 24 July 2019, Boris Johnson became prime minister and immediately appointed Wallace as Secretary of State for Defence, replacing Penny Mordaunt, who was left out of the new government. In August 2019, Wallace was overheard discussing Johnson's controversial prorogation of parliament with Florence Parly, the French Armed Forces minister. He suggested that the reason for the prorogation for five weeks was to prevent MPs from blocking the government's Brexit plans, rather than the government's official position that it was to introduce a new legislative agenda. 10 Downing Street responded to his comments by admonishing him and stating that he had "misspoken". This prorogation was deemed unlawful by the Supreme Court on 24 September 2019.

On 13 October 2019, in a NATO meeting, Wallace defended the 2019 Turkish offensive into north-eastern Syria. He commented, "Turkey needs to do what it sometimes has to do to defend itself". His comments were condemned by other delegates at the meeting. On 12 January 2020, in an interview with The Sunday Times, Wallace said that the UK "must be prepared to fight wars without the US", one of the UK's key allies. He stated that the upcoming defence review "should be used to make the UK less dependent on the US in future conflicts". His comments were made in response to US President Donald Trump's "America First" isolationist policies. Wallace also said that the next defence review would be the "deepest review" of Britain's defence and foreign policies since the end of the Cold War in 1991. On 15 March 2021, as part of the Integrated Review, Wallace released a command paper titled Defence in a Competitive Age, in which he detailed "a mission to seek out and to understand future threats, and to invest in the capabilities to defeat them," promising an expenditure of £188 billion on defence over the next four years.

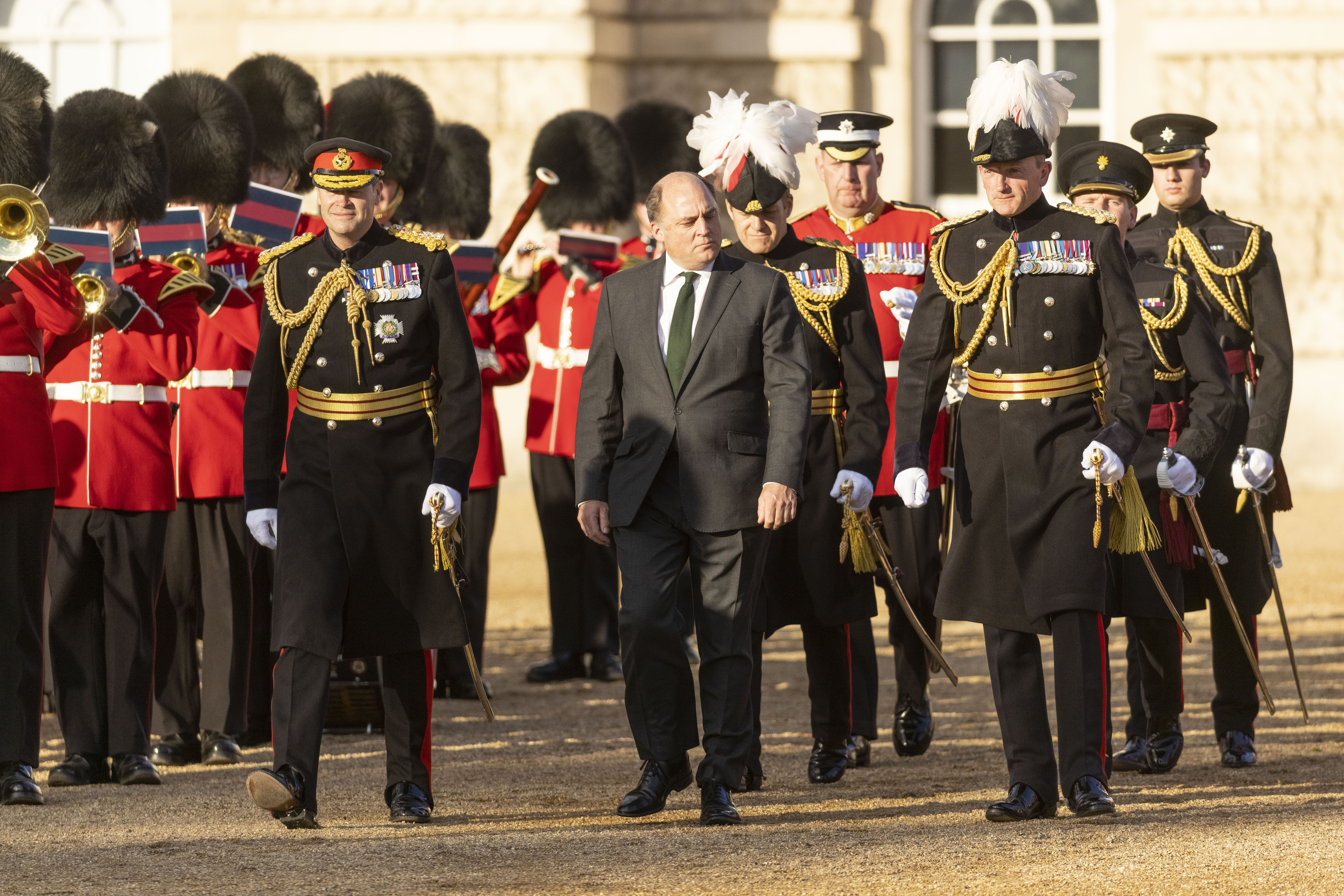
Wallace with senior British Army officers at the Household Division Military Musical Spectacular in 2022

In July 2021, Wallace said that the United States had left Britain in a "very difficult position" following the withdrawal of most US troops from Afghanistan. Soon after the withdrawal of US troops had started, the Taliban had launched an offensive against the Afghan government, quickly advancing in front of a collapsing Afghan Armed Forces. Wallace said the UK would be ready to work with the Taliban should they come to power provided they adhere to certain international norms. On 16 August 2021, during a radio interview on LBC about the withdrawal from Afghanistan, Wallace was asked by an LBC interviewer, "why do you feel it so personally, Mr Wallace?" He replied with emotion: "because I'm a soldier ... because it's sad, and the West has done what it's done and we have to do our very best to get people out and stand by our obligations".

Wallace was the minister responsible for the British evacuation from Kabul, Operation Pitting. He was involved in a controversial decision to allow Pen Farthing – who ran an animal sanctuary in Kabul – to evacuate 71 people and more than 100 animals from Kabul to the UK. Wallace said Ministry of Defence staff had suffered abuse from some of Farthing's supporters, who alleged the government had initially abandoned Farthing. In December 2021, Wallace met with Saudi Arabia's Crown Prince Mohammed bin Salman to discuss cooperation in various fields, especially defence, having discussed similar matters the previous year with Saudi Arabia's vice defence minister Prince Khalid bin Salman. In 2022, at an event to mark the 40th anniversary of the end of the Falklands War, Wallace declared Britain's determination to "stand up to bullies". His words were decried as "belligerent threats" and "denigrating references" by Argentina.

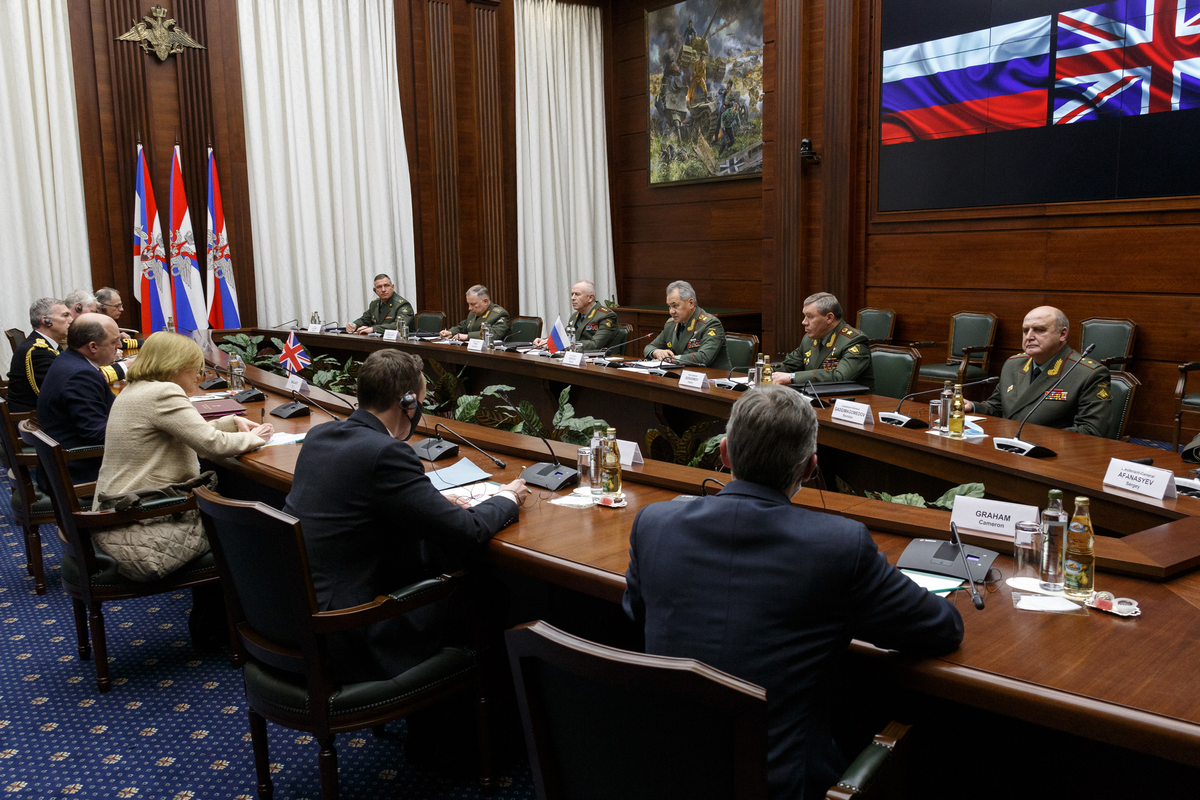
Wallace with Russian Minister of Defence Sergei Shoigu in Moscow in February 2022. Shoigu denied that Russia was planning an invasion of Ukraine.

Wallace met Sergei Shoigu, the Russian Minister of Defence in Moscow on 11 February 2022. Shoigu reiterated a denial of any Russian intentions to invade Ukraine. The following day, Wallace said that a Russian invasion of Ukraine was "highly likely", and British citizens were being told by the Foreign Office to evacuate while commercial means were still available. Ukraine's ambassador to the UK, Vadym Prystaiko, said Wallace's comparison of diplomatic efforts with Russia to the appeasement policies of the 1930s was unhelpful, saying now is the wrong time to "offend our partners". On 23 February 2022, Wallace was filmed saying that the Scots Guards "kicked the backside" of Nicholas I of Russia during the Crimean War, and could do so again. Russia invaded Ukraine the following day.

On 21 March 2022, clipped footage of Wallace in a prank call by Russian pranksters Vovan and Lexus was released online. The duo (suspected by the British government to have links to Russian security services or of being Russian state actors) impersonated the Ukrainian prime minister Denys Shmyhal saying that Ukraine wished to promote its own nuclear deterrent to protect itself from Russia, a false claim made by the Russian government during the Russo-Ukrainian War and the invasion of Ukraine. Wallace was believed to be on a Microsoft Teams call with the duo for ten minutes. That day, Wallace announced plans to reduce the number of British Army personnel from 76,500 to 72,500.

Wallace was perceived as responsible for initial British reluctance to send Challenger 2 tanks to Ukraine in March 2022, saying that the idea "wouldn't work". Boris Johnson and his German counterpart Olaf Scholz agreed on 8 April that both European allies would withhold their Western-designed main battle tanks from the fray. Johnson instead chose to backfill the Polish Army, thus allowing them to send their obsolete T-72s to Ukraine, while they waited for their order of South Korean K2 Black Panther replacements. Despite a planned reduction of the British tank fleet from 227 Challenger 2 tanks to 148 upgraded Challenger 3 tanks, there were no plans to send British tanks to the Ukrainians. Wallace later announced that the number of Challenger 3 tanks required by the UK was under review. In January 2023, the British position was reversed, and Challenger 2 tanks were supplied to Ukraine in March 2023.

Boris Johnson announced his intention to resign as prime minister and leader of the Conservative Party in July 2022 following a series of mass resignations from his government. Wallace was seen as a contender to succeed him as party leader and thus prime minister, but on 10 July he ruled himself out from entering the contest. In a statement on Twitter, he said his focus was on his current job and "keeping this great country safe". He later endorsed Liz Truss in the election. Following the appointment of Truss as prime minister, Wallace was reappointed to his post on 6 September 2022. He retained his post when Rishi Sunak became prime minister on 25 October. On 7 November 2022, Wallace announced that the competition to build a new national flagship yacht would be scrapped with immediate effect.

On 19 January 2023, Wallace together with the defence ministers of Estonia, Poland, Latvia and Lithuania; and the representatives of Denmark, the Czech Republic, the Netherlands, and Slovakia issued the Tallinn Pledge, "to reaffirm our continued determination and resolve to supporting Ukraine in their heroic resistance against the illegal and unprovoked Russian aggression."

On 21 June 2023, Wallace ruled himself out of the running to become the next NATO Secretary-General after rumours spread that the US were in favour of Jens Stoltenberg staying in post.

Speaking at a NATO summit in Lithuania on 11 July, Wallace said that Ukraine should offer more gratitude to Western allies of the country, following the Ukrainian president Volodymyr Zelenskyy's frustration at not being given a formal invitation to join the NATO alliance. Wallace also said that American and British lawmakers felt that Ukraine was demanding an Amazon-style wishlist of demands in military aid.

On 15 July 2023, Wallace announced his intention to resign as Secretary of State for Defence at the next Cabinet reshuffle and confirmed that he would not be seeking re-election as an MP at the 2024 general election. By length of tenure, he was the longest-serving Conservative Secretary of State for Defence on record. Wallace was also the longest-serving participant in the current UK Cabinet by continuous service; attending without interruption since his 2016 appointment as Minister of State for Security. On 31 August 2023, Wallace formally resigned as Secretary of State for Defence.

== Post-parliamentary career ==
=== Political and policy commentary ===
In 2024, Wallace was voluble on defence-related matters. In April 2024, after the 300-unit drone strike by Iran on Israel Wallace said the event "had dashed his own hopes that reformers would one day triumph over the hardliners." He wrote an op-ed in The Daily Telegraph and advised the West to "hit back twice as hard" against Iran and Russia and "not stop until they get the message". The pair "thrive on the West’s lack of resolve, revel in sowing division, and delight in weakening." He also called on Israel to supply Ukraine with weapons in light of the Russian investment in the Iranian drone and missile programme. In February 2024, Wallace expressed his displeasure over German Chancellor Olaf Scholz' refusal to give Ukraine the Taurus missile.

Contemporaneous to the 75th NATO Summit in July 2024, Wallace opined that Europe can and should do more to help Ukraine. "The good news story on Ukraine is that Europe has already contributed collectively more to Ukraine than the United States. So it is not entirely impossible that if America froze out Ukraine, that Europe couldn’t stand up and contribute more assistance to Ukraine." In August 2024, Wallace was interviewed by Times Radio and said Ukraine "should be given the tools to finish the job" against Russia. He echoed past UKCGS Sir Patrick Sanders' exit remarks about Western nervousness over Russian nuclear sabre-rattling rhetoric. In September 2024, Wallace, speaking to BBC Radio 4's Today programme, said that the "tug of war" over long-range missiles that can strike targets in Russia, such as Storm Shadow, was repetitive nonsense and only helped Putin.

=== Private sector ===
In 2024, Wallace became a partner in Boka Group, an American-British private equity firm focused on investing in defence and aerospace companies. Also in 2024, he joined the firm CTRD as a senior adviser, focusing on advising Saudi Arabia on reform, governance, and security. In April 2025, it was announced that Wallace joined the board of Advanced Innergy Holdings, a UK materials technology company, as a non-executive director.

== Personal life ==
Wallace married Liza Cooke in 2001. They met when she was a researcher in the Scottish Parliament and Wallace was an MSP. His wife worked as a part-time parliamentary assistant in his office until 30 April 2019. They have since separated. He has described the burden of his job on his private life as one of the regrets of his political career. The couple have two sons and a daughter. His children were divided on whether Wallace should have made a pitch for the Conservative leadership in 2022.

Wallace divides his time between Lancashire and London. Outside politics, he lists his recreations as skiing, sailing, rugby and horse racing. He is a member of the Third Guards club.

== Honours ==
Ribbon	Description	Notes
	Knight Commander of the Most Honourable Order of the Bath (KCB)	2024 Dissolution Honours, for political and public service
	General Service Medal	Northern Ireland Clasp; Mentioned in Despatches
	Queen Elizabeth II Diamond Jubilee Medal	
	Queen Elizabeth II Platinum Jubilee Medal	
	Cross of Merit of the Ministry of Defence (Class I)	Estonia
	Order of Prince Yaroslav the Wise (Class II)	Ukraine
	USSOCOM medal	United States

Parliament of the United Kingdom
Preceded by Hilton Dawson	Member of Parliament for Lancaster and Wyre; 2005–2010	Succeeded by Eric Ollerenshaw as MP for Lancaster and Fleetwood
Constituency established	Member of Parliament for Wyre and Preston North; 2010–2024	Constituency abolished
Political offices
Preceded by Andrew Murrison	Parliamentary Under-Secretary of State for Northern Ireland; 2015–2016	Succeeded by Kris Hopkins
Preceded by John Hayes	Minister of State for Security and Economic Crime; 2016–2019	Succeeded by Brandon Lewis as Minister of State for Security
Preceded by Penny Mordaunt	Secretary of State for Defence; 2019–2023	Succeeded by Grant Shapps
