= List of marginal seats before the 2024 United Kingdom general election =

The 2024 general election was held on 4 July 2024. This list shows the most marginal seats, ie those needing the smallest swing to be won by each of the political parties, according to notional results from the previous election in 2019, as applied to the 2024 constituency boundaries. The term "target seats" is sometimes used to describe seats requiring a low swing, but it is also used to refer to the seats on which a party has chosen to "target" its campaigning. The list of a party's target seats is not made public.

Owing to boundary changes following the 2023 review of Westminster constituencies, these target seats are determined by notional results of the previous election using the new constituencies as if they were contested in 2019.

== List by party ==
=== Conservative ===
Seats needing smallest swing to be won by Conservatives
Rank	Constituency	Winning party 2019	Swing required	Winning party 2024
1	Warrington South (Note: Warrington South was won by the Conservatives in 2019, but is notionally a Labour seat under new boundaries)	Labour Party	0.06%	Labour Party
2	Coventry North West	Labour Party	0.22%	Labour Party
3	Kensington and Bayswater (Note: Kensington was won by the Conservatives in 2019, but is notionally a Labour seat under new boundaries)	Labour Party	0.36%	Labour Party
4	Alyn and Deeside	Labour Party	0.39%	Labour Party
5	Wirral West	Labour Party	0.41%	Labour Party
6	Beckenham and Penge (Note: Beckenham was won by the Conservatives in 2019, but is notionally a Labour seat under new boundaries)	Labour Party	0.52%	Labour Party
7	Heywood and Middleton North (Note: Heywood and Middleton was won by the Conservatives in 2019, but is notionally a Labour seat under new boundaries)	Labour Party	0.80%	Labour Party
8	Dagenham and Rainham	Labour Party	0.80%	Labour Party
9	Coventry South (Note: New seat)	Labour Party	0.86%	Labour Party
10	Warwick and Leamington	Labour Party	1.12%	Labour Party
11	Bedford	Labour Party	1.19%	Labour Party
12	Pontefract, Castleford and Knottingley	Labour Party	1.31%	Labour Party
13	Doncaster Central	Labour Party	1.38%	Labour Party
14	Ceredigion Preseli (Note: Preseli Pembrokeshire was won by the Conservatives in 2019, but is notionally a Plaid Cymru seat under new boundaries)	Plaid Cymru	1.40%	Plaid Cymru
15	Rawmarsh and Conisbrough	Labour Party	1.55%	Labour Party
16	Chesterfield	Labour Party	1.61%	Labour Party
17	Oldham East and Saddleworth	Labour Party	1.62%	Labour Party
18	Warrington North	Labour Party	1.63%	Labour Party
19	Canterbury	Labour Party	1.89%	Labour Party
20	Halifax	Labour Party	1.99%	Labour Party
21	Newport West and Islwyn	Labour Party	2.06%	Labour Party
22	Perth and Kinross-shire	Scottish National Party	2.09%	Scottish National Party
23	Cramlington and Killingworth (Note: Blyth Valley was won by the Conservatives in 2019, but its successor seat is notionally a Labour seat under new boundaries)	Labour Party	2.24%	Labour Party
24	Ayr, Carrick and Cumnock	Scottish National Party	2.50%	Labour Party
25	Moray West, Nairn and Strathspey	Scottish National Party	2.56%	Scottish National Party
26	Doncaster North	Labour Party	2.58%	Labour Party
27	Nottingham North and Kimberley	Labour Party	2.89%	Labour Party
28	Gower	Labour Party	2.93%	Labour Party
29	Leeds East	Labour Party	3.06%	Labour Party
30	Leeds West and Pudsey (Note: Pudsey was won by the Conservatives in 2019, but merged with Leeds West, is notionally a Labour seat under new boundaries)	Labour Party	3.09%	Labour Party
31	Wolverhampton South East	Labour Party	3.10%	Labour Party
32	Tynemouth	Labour Party	3.26%	Labour Party
33	Bradford South	Labour Party	3.34%	Labour Party
34	Croydon East	Labour Party	3.37%	Labour Party
35	Sunderland Central	Labour Party	3.41%	Labour Party
36	Stalybridge and Hyde	Labour Party	3.48%	Labour Party
37	Lothian East	Scottish National Party (Note: The incumbent MP is Kenny MacAskill from the Alba Party who defected from the SNP)	3.62%	Labour Party
38	Houghton and Sunderland South	Labour Party	3.65%	Labour Party
39	Kingston upon Hull East	Labour Party	3.67%	Labour Party

Other seats gained and lost in by-elections
Rank	Constituency	Winning party 2019	Swing required	Winning party 2024
46	Hartlepool	Labour Party (Note: This seat was won by the Conservative Party in a by-election.)	4.38%	Labour Party
–	Mid Bedfordshire (Note: This seat was won by the Labour Party in a a by-election; part of this constituency was transferred to the new Hitchin constituency which is where the incumbent Labour MP stood.)	Conservative Party	–	Conservative Party

=== Labour ===
Seats needing smallest swing to be won by Labour
Rank	Constituency	Winning party 2019	Swing required	Winning party 2024
1	Burnley	Conservative Party	0.13%	Labour Party
2	Leigh and Atherton	Conservative Party	0.33%	Labour Party
3	High Peak	Conservative Party	0.54%	Labour Party
4	Bangor Aberconwy	Conservative Party	0.77%	Labour Party
5	Wolverhampton West	Conservative Party	0.92%	Labour Party
6	Bury South	Conservative Party	0.94%	Labour Party
7	Bury North	Conservative Party	1.20%	Labour Party
8	Bolton North East	Conservative Party	1.28%	Labour Party
9	Watford	Conservative Party	1.35%	Labour Party
10	Chingford and Woodford Green	Conservative Party	1.47%	Conservative Party
11	Wycombe	Conservative Party	1.58%	Labour Party
12	Birmingham Northfield	Conservative Party	1.68%	Labour Party
13	Leeds North West (Note: Leeds North West was won by Labour in 2019, but is notionally a Conservative seat under new boundaries)	Conservative Party	1.80%	Labour Party
14	Stroud	Conservative Party	2.03%	Labour Party
15	Keighley and Ilkley	Conservative Party	2.11%	Conservative Party
16	Stoke-on-Trent Central	Conservative Party	2.11%	Labour Party
17	Lothian East	Scottish National Party	2.15%	Labour Party
18	Whitehaven and Workington	Conservative Party	2.17%	Labour Party
19	Gedling	Conservative Party	2.22%	Labour Party
20	Walsall and Bloxwich	Conservative Party	2.40%	Labour Party
21	Peterborough	Conservative Party	2.47%	Labour Party
22	Vale of Glamorgan	Conservative Party	2.57%	Labour Party
23	West Bromwich	Conservative Party	2.60%	Labour Party
24	Mid Cheshire	Conservative Party	2.66%	Labour Party
25	Wakefield and Rothwell (Note: Predecessor seat gained in by-election)	Conservative Party	2.67%	Labour Party
26	Ynys Mon	Conservative Party	2.69%	Plaid Cymru
27	Derby North	Conservative Party	2.70%	Labour Party
28	Bridgend	Conservative Party	2.73%	Labour Party
29	Clwyd North	Conservative Party	2.76%	Labour Party
30	Lancaster and Wyre (Note: Wyre and Preston North was won by the Conservatives in 2019, but merged with Lancaster and Fleetwood which was won by Labour, is notionally a Conservative seat under new boundaries)	Conservative Party	3.05%	Labour Party
31	Hastings and Rye	Conservative Party	3.36%	Labour Party
32	Eltham and Chislehurst (Note: Eltham was won by Labour in 2019, but merged with Bromley and Chislehurst which was won by the Conservatives, is notionally a Conservative seat under new boundaries)	Conservative Party	3.37%	Labour Party
33	Cowdenbeath and Kirkcaldy	Scottish National Party (Note: The incumbent MP is Neale Hanvey from the Alba Party who defected from the SNP)	3.41%	Labour Party
34	Lincoln	Conservative Party	3.47%	Labour Party
35	Hyndburn	Conservative Party	3.48%	Labour Party
36	Broxtowe	Conservative Party	3.58%	Labour Party
37	Chipping Barnet	Conservative Party	3.60%	Labour Party
38	Northampton North	Conservative Party	3.85%	Labour Party
39	Newton Aycliffe and Spennymoor	Conservative Party	3.93%	Labour Party
40	Hendon	Conservative Party	4.01%	Labour Party
41	Truro and Falmouth	Conservative Party	4.04%	Labour Party
42	Wrexham	Conservative Party	4.18%	Labour Party
43	Kingston upon Hull West and Haltemprice (Note: Kingston upon Hull West was won by Labour in 2019, but merged with Haltemprice and Howden, is notionally a Conservative seat under new boundaries)	Conservative Party	4.35%	Labour Party
44	Blackpool South	Conservative Party	4.36%	Labour Party
45	Calder Valley	Conservative Party	4.52%	Labour Party
46	Southampton Itchen	Conservative Party	4.70%	Labour Party
47	Milton Keynes Central	Conservative Party	4.70%	Labour Party
48	Clwyd East	Conservative Party	5.00%	Labour Party
49	Glasgow North East	Scottish National Party	5.01%	Labour Party
50	Darlington	Conservative Party	5.36%	Labour Party
51	Redcar	Conservative Party	5.45%	Labour Party
52	Ipswich	Conservative Party	5.53%	Labour Party
53	Coatbridge and Bellshill	Scottish National Party	5.54%	Labour Party
54	Altrincham and Sale West	Conservative Party	5.61%	Labour Party
55	Swindon South	Conservative Party	5.70%	Labour Party
56	Cities of London and Westminster	Conservative Party	5.73%	Labour Party
57	Airdrie and Shotts	Scottish National Party	5.74%	Labour Party
58	Bolsover	Conservative Party	5.77%	Labour Party
59	Shipley	Conservative Party	5.78%	Labour Party
60	Crewe and Nantwich	Conservative Party	5.79%	Labour Party
61	Rutherglen (Note: Rutherglen and Hamilton West was won by Labour in the 2023 by-election, but is still notionally an SNP seat under new boundaries.)	Scottish National Party	5.90%	Labour Party
62.	Loughborough	Conservative Party	5.90%	Labour Party
63.	Midlothian	Scottish National Party	5.92%	Labour Party
64.	Rushcliffe	Conservative Party	6.12%	Labour Party
65.	Tipton and Wednesbury	Conservative Party	6.14%	Labour Party
66.	Norwich North	Conservative Party	6.25%	Labour Party
67.	Spen Valley	Conservative Party	6.42%	Labour Party
68.	Glasgow South West	Scottish National Party	6.43%	Labour Party
69.	Milton Keynes North	Conservative Party	6.55%	Labour Party
70.	Worcester	Conservative Party	6.64%	Labour Party
71.	Glasgow North	Scottish National Party	6.72%	Labour Party
72.	Rother Valley	Conservative Party	6.74%	Labour Party
73.	Southport	Conservative Party	6.80%	Labour Party
74.	Ashfield	Conservative Party (Note: The incumbent MP is Lee Anderson from Reform UK who defected from the Conservatives)	6.81%	Reform UK
75.	Shrewsbury	Conservative Party	6.96%	Labour Party
76.	East Worthing and Shoreham	Conservative Party	7.03%	Labour Party
77.	Caerfyrddin	Conservative Party	7.04%	Plaid Cymru
78.	Penistone and Stocksbridge	Conservative Party	7.28%	Labour Party
79.	Barrow and Furness	Conservative Party	7.43%	Labour Party
80.	Colne Valley	Conservative Party	7.46%	Labour Party
81.	Ceredigion Preseli	Plaid Cymru	7.49%	Plaid Cymru
82.	Filton and Bradley Stoke	Conservative Party	7.61%	Labour Party
83.	Glasgow East	Scottish National Party	7.62%	Labour Party
84.	Uxbridge and South Ruislip	Conservative Party	7.77%	Labour Party
85.	Mid and South Pembrokeshire	Conservative Party	7.84%	Labour Party
86.	East Thanet	Conservative Party	7.91%	Labour Party
87.	Corby and East Northamptonshire	Conservative Party	8.05%	Labour Party
88.	Leeds South West and Morley	Conservative Party	8.16%	Labour Party
89.	Hamilton and Clyde Valley	Scottish National Party	8.18%	Labour Party
90.	Bishop Auckland	Conservative Party	8.19%	Labour Party
91.	Chelsea and Fulham	Conservative Party	8.21%	Labour Party
92.	Crawley	Conservative Party	8.38%	Labour Party
93.	Na h-Eileanan an Iar	Scottish National Party (Note: The incumbent is Independent MP Angus MacNeil who was expelled from the SNP)	8.42%	Labour Party
94.	Harrow East	Conservative Party	8.59%	Conservative Party
95.	South Ribble	Conservative Party	8.65%	Labour Party
96.	Newcastle-under-Lyme	Conservative Party	8.73%	Labour Party
97.	Bournemouth East	Conservative Party	8.94%	Labour Party
98.	Stevenage	Conservative Party	8.98%	Labour Party
99.	Motherwell, Wishaw and Carluke	Scottish National Party	9.11%	Labour Party
100.	Glasgow South	Scottish National Party	9.42%	Labour Party
101.	Camborne and Redruth	Conservative Party	9.55%	Labour Party
102.	Inverclyde and Renfrewshire West	Scottish National Party	9.64%	Labour Party
103.	Stoke-on-Trent North	Conservative Party	9.65%	Labour Party
104.	Gloucester	Conservative Party	9.67%	Labour Party
105.	Finchley and Golders Green	Conservative Party	9.72%	Labour Party
106.	York Outer	Conservative Party	9.85%	Labour Party
107.	Rossendale and Darwen	Conservative Party	9.85%	Labour Party
108.	Wolverhampton North East	Conservative Party	9.92%	Labour Party
109.	Macclesfield	Conservative Party	9.94%	Labour Party
110.	Blackpool North and Fleetwood	Conservative Party	10.11%	Labour Party
111.	Monmouthshire	Conservative Party	10.25%	Labour Party
112.	Glasgow West	Scottish National Party	10.29%	Labour Party
113.	Scarborough and Whitby	Conservative Party	10.33%	Labour Party
114.	Dunfermline and Dollar	Scottish National Party	10.36%	Labour Party
115.	Welwyn Hatfield	Conservative Party	10.40%	Labour Party
116.	Hitchin	Conservative Party	10.42%	Labour Party
117.	West Dunbartonshire	Scottish National Party	10.56%	Labour Party
118.	Bolton West	Conservative Party	10.65%	Labour Party
119.	Scunthorpe	Conservative Party	10.72%	Labour Party
120.	Carlisle	Conservative Party	10.82%	Labour Party
121.	Erewash	Conservative Party	10.86%	Labour Party
122.	Bournemouth West	Conservative Party	10.86%	Labour Party
123.	Edinburgh North and Leith	Scottish National Party	11.03%	Labour Party
124.	Earley and Woodley	Conservative Party	11.05%	Labour Party
125.	Glenrothes and Mid Fife	Scottish National Party	11.06%	Labour Party
126	Colchester	Conservative Party	11.14%	Labour Party
127	Stockton West	Conservative Party	11.29%	Conservative Party
128	Edinburgh East and Musselburgh	Scottish National Party	11.29%	Labour Party
129	Hexham	Conservative Party	11.29%	Labour Party
130	Ossett and Denby Dale	Conservative Party	11.34%	Labour Party
131	Middlesbrough South and East Cleveland	Conservative Party	11.44%	Labour Party
132	Dwyfor Meirionnydd	Plaid Cymru	11.45%	Plaid Cymru
133	Doncaster East and the Isle of Axholme	Conservative Party	11.70%	Labour Party
134	Great Grimsby and Cleethorpes	Conservative Party	11.71%	Labour Party
135	Pendle and Clitheroe	Conservative Party	11.92%	Labour Party
136	Paisley and Renfrewshire South	Scottish National Party	11.96%	Labour Party
137	Basingstoke	Conservative Party	12.02%	Labour Party
138	Bathgate and Linlithgow	Scottish National Party	12.11%	Labour Party
139	Dover and Deal	Conservative Party	12.13%	Labour Party
140	Penrith and Solway	Conservative Party	12.31%	Labour Party
141	Cumbernauld and Kirkintilloch	Scottish National Party	12.45%	Labour Party
142	Telford	Conservative Party	12.52%	Labour Party
143	Paisley and Renfrewshire North	Scottish National Party	12.56%	Labour Party
144	East Kilbride and Strathaven	Scottish National Party	12.60%	Labour Party
145	Livingston	Scottish National Party	12.61%	Labour Party
146	Buckingham and Bletchley	Conservative Party	12.68%	Labour Party
147	Morecambe and Lunesdale	Conservative Party	12.75%	Labour Party
148	North East Derbyshire	Conservative Party	13.04%	Labour Party
149	Croydon South	Conservative Party	13.06%	Conservative Party
150	Rugby	Conservative Party	13.10%	Labour Party

Other seats gained and lost in by-elections that Labour is targeting
Rank	Constituency	Winning party 2019	Swing required	Winning party 2024
163	Selby	Conservative Party	14.06%	Labour Party
211	Wellingborough and Rushden	Conservative Party	17.05%	Labour Party
–	Bristol North East	Labour Party	–	Labour Party
–	Hartlepool	Labour Party	–	Labour Party
–	Mid Bedfordshire	Conservative Party	–	Conservative Party
–	Rochdale	Labour Party (Note: This seat was won by the Workers Party in a by-election.)	–	Labour Party
–	Tamworth	Conservative Party	–	Labour Party

=== Liberal Democrats ===
Seats needing smallest swing to be won by Liberal Democrats
Rank	Constituency	Winning party 2019	Swing required	Winning party 2024
1	Carshalton and Wallington	Conservative Party	0.64%	Liberal Democrats
2	North East Fife (Note: North East Fife was won by the Liberal Democrats in 2019, but is notionally an SNP seat under new boundaries. This seat was considered ultra-marginal, but in fact was held by the Liberal Democrats in 2024 with a 13,479-vote (31.5%) majority.)	Scottish National Party	0.70%	Liberal Democrats
3	Wimbledon	Conservative Party	0.74%	Liberal Democrats
4	Sheffield Hallam	Labour Party	0.92%	Labour Party
5	South Cambridgeshire	Conservative Party	1.25%	Liberal Democrats
6	Cheltenham	Conservative Party	1.25%	Liberal Democrats
7	Mid Dunbartonshire	Scottish National Party	1.69%	Liberal Democrats
8	Cheadle	Conservative Party	2.09%	Liberal Democrats
9	Eastbourne	Conservative Party	2.11%	Liberal Democrats
10	Caithness, Sutherland and Easter Ross (Note: Caithness, Sutherland and Easter Ross was won by the Liberal Democrats in 2019, but is notionally an SNP seat under new boundaries. This seat was considered ultra-marginal but now has a notional SNP majority of over 3,000 votes; in fact it was held by the Liberal Democrats in 2024 with a 10,489-vote (22.8%) majority.)	Scottish National Party	2.64%	Liberal Democrats
11	Esher and Walton	Conservative Party	2.68%	Liberal Democrats
12	Guildford	Conservative Party	2.96%	Liberal Democrats
13	Lewes	Conservative Party	3.71%	Liberal Democrats
14	Hazel Grove	Conservative Party	4.18%	Liberal Democrats
15	Westmorland and Lonsdale (Note: Westmorland and Lonsdale was won by the Liberal Democrats in 2019, but was notionally a Conservative seat under new boundaries; in fact it was held by the Liberal Democrats in 2024 with a 21,472-vote (43.3%) majority.)	Conservative Party	4.74%	Liberal Democrats
16	St Ives	Conservative Party	4.85%	Liberal Democrats
17	Finchley and Golders Green	Conservative Party	5.98%	Labour Party
18	Cities of London and Westminster	Conservative Party	6.05%	Labour Party
19	Winchester	Conservative Party	7.08%	Liberal Democrats
20	Taunton and Wellington	Conservative Party	7.84%	Liberal Democrats
21	Harrogate and Knaresborough	Conservative Party	7.91%	Liberal Democrats
22	Cambridge	Labour Party	8.14%	Labour Party
23	Sutton and Cheam	Conservative Party	8.27%	Liberal Democrats
24	Woking	Conservative Party	8.50%	Liberal Democrats
25	Brecon, Radnor and Cwm Tawe	Conservative Party	8.70%	Liberal Democrats
26	Eastleigh	Conservative Party	8.72%	Liberal Democrats
27	Didcot and Wantage	Conservative Party	9.22%	Liberal Democrats
28	Bermondsey and Old Southwark	Labour Party	9.28%	Labour Party
29	Dorking and Horley	Conservative Party	9.44%	Liberal Democrats
30	Godalming and Ash	Conservative Party	9.63%	Conservative Party
31	West Dorset	Conservative Party	10.71%	Liberal Democrats
32	Chelsea and Fulham	Conservative Party	10.82%	Labour Party
33	Henley and Thame	Conservative Party	11.05%	Liberal Democrats
34	Newbury	Conservative Party	11.24%	Liberal Democrats
35	Wokingham	Conservative Party	11.59%	Liberal Democrats
36	Hitchin	Conservative Party	11.67%	Labour Party
37	Hampstead and Highgate	Labour Party	11.68%	Labour Party
38	St Neots and Mid Cambridgeshire	Conservative Party	12.24%	Liberal Democrats
39	Ely and East Cambridgeshire	Conservative Party	12.35%	Liberal Democrats
40	South Devon	Conservative Party	12.66%	Liberal Democrats
41	Wells and Mendip Hills	Conservative Party	12.66%	Liberal Democrats
42	Mid Sussex	Conservative Party	12.90%	Liberal Democrats
43	Frome and East Somerset	Conservative Party	12.92%	Liberal Democrats
44	Thornbury and Yate	Conservative Party	12.96%	Liberal Democrats
45	Chippenham	Conservative Party	13.06%	Liberal Democrats
46	Farnham and Bordon	Conservative Party	13.27%	Conservative Party
47	North Devon	Conservative Party	13.33%	Liberal Democrats
48	Glastonbury and Somerton	Conservative Party	13.33%	Liberal Democrats
49	Tunbridge Wells	Conservative Party	13.40%	Liberal Democrats
50	Earley and Woodley	Conservative Party	13.48%	Labour Party
51	Harpenden and Berkhamsted	Conservative Party	13.52%	Liberal Democrats
52	Yeovil	Conservative Party	13.52%	Liberal Democrats
53	Ceredigion Preseli	Plaid Cymru	13.64%	Plaid Cymru
54	Bicester and Woodstock	Conservative Party	13.66%	Liberal Democrats
55	Norfolk North	Conservative Party	14.05%	Liberal Democrats
56	Chelmsford	Conservative Party	14.32%	Liberal Democrats
57	Cornwall North	Conservative Party	14.59%	Liberal Democrats
58	Romsey and Southampton North	Conservative Party	14.68%	Conservative Party
59	Epsom and Ewell	Conservative Party	14.68%	Liberal Democrats
60	Surrey Heath	Conservative Party	14.74%	Liberal Democrats
61	Aylesbury	Conservative Party	14.90%	Labour Party
62	Durham, City of	Conservative Party	14.92%	Labour Party
63	Mid Dorset and North Poole	Conservative Party	15.09%	Liberal Democrats
64	Runnymede and Weybridge	Conservative Party	15.12%	Conservative Party
65	South Cotswolds	Conservative Party	15.13%	Liberal Democrats
66	Melksham and Devizes	Conservative Party	15.27%	Liberal Democrats
67	York Outer	Conservative Party	15.48%	Labour Party
68	Horsham	Conservative Party	15.54%	Liberal Democrats
69	Edinburgh North and Leith	Scottish National Party	15.64%	Labour Party
70	Hornsey and Friern Barnet	Labour Party	15.81%	Labour Party
71	Banbury	Conservative Party	15.81%	Labour Party
72	Witney	Conservative Party	16.05%	Liberal Democrats
73	Newton Abbot	Conservative Party	16.65%	Liberal Democrats
74	Inverness, Skye and West Ross-shire	Scottish National Party	16.78%	Liberal Democrats
75	Maidenhead	Conservative Party	16.79%	Liberal Democrats
76	Chesham and Amersham	Conservative Party (Note: This seat was won by the Liberal Democrats in a by-election.)	16.96%	Liberal Democrats
77	Brentford and Isleworth	Labour Party	17.00%	Labour Party
78	Bathgate and Linlithgow	Scottish National Party	17.39%	Labour Party
79	Torbay	Conservative Party	17.41%	Liberal Democrats
80	Ealing Central and Acton	Labour Party	17.47%	Labour Party
81	East Grinstead and Uckfield	Conservative Party	17.73%	Conservative Party
82	Newcastle upon Tyne North	Labour Party	17.750%	Labour Party
83	Stratford-on-Avon	Conservative Party	17.76%	Liberal Democrats
88	Tewkesbury	Conservative Party	18.05%	Liberal Democrats
103	Chichester	Conservative Party	19.23%	Liberal Democrats
111	Hampshire North East	Conservative Party	19.77%	Liberal Democrats

Other seats gained in by-elections the Liberal Democrats are targeting
Rank	Constituency	Winning party 2019	Swing required	Winning party 2024
142	Tiverton and Minehead	Conservative Party	20.91%	Liberal Democrats
258	Honiton and Sidmouth	Conservative Party	24.99%	Liberal Democrats
–	North Shropshire	Conservative Party	–	Liberal Democrats

=== Reform UK ===
The target seats for Reform UK are based on results of the Brexit Party in 2019. The party didn't contest Conservative-held seats so their target seats based on the 2019 result are primarily in North East England and Wales.

Seats needing smallest swing to be won by Reform UK
Rank	Constituency	Winning party 2019	Swing required	Winning party 2024
1	Barnsley North	Labour Party	4.50%	Labour Party
2	Hartlepool (Note: Hartlepool was won by the Conservatives in the 2021 Hartlepool by-election)	Labour Party	5.92%	Labour Party
3	Barnsley South	Labour Party	6.29%	Labour Party
4	Doncaster North	Labour Party	12.82%	Labour Party
5	Easington	Labour Party	14.31%	Labour Party
6	South Shields	Labour Party	14.70%	Labour Party
7	Rotherham	Labour Party	16.07%	Labour Party
8	Normanton and Hemsworth	Labour Party	16.19%	Labour Party
9	Blaenau Gwent and Rhymney	Labour Party	16.20%	Labour Party
10	Houghton and Sunderland South	Labour Party	16.81%	Labour Party
11	Caerphilly	Labour Party	16.85%	Labour Party
12	Kingston upon Hull East	Labour Party	17.46%	Labour Party
13	Wigan	Labour Party	18.55%	Labour Party
14	Pontypridd	Labour Party	19.09%	Labour Party
15	Neath and Swansea East	Labour Party	19.38%	Labour Party
16	Washington and Gateshead South	Labour Party	19.60%	Labour Party
17	Pontefract, Castleford and Knottingley	Labour Party	19.77%	Labour Party
18	Jarrow and Gateshead East	Labour Party	19.84%	Labour Party
19	Torfaen	Labour Party	20.12%	Labour Party
20	Kingston upon Hull West and Haltemprice (Note: Hull West was won by Labour in 2019, but is notionally a Conservative seat under new boundaries)	Conservative Party	20.31%	Labour Party

Other seats Reform UK is targeting
Rank	Constituency	Winning party 2019	Swing required	Winning party 2024
32	Ashfield	Conservative Party	21.88%	Reform UK
–	Boston and Skegness	Conservative Party	–	Reform UK
–	Clacton	Conservative Party	–	Reform UK

=== Scottish National Party ===
Seats needing smallest swing to be won by Scottish National Party
Rank	Constituency	Winning party 2019	Swing required	Winning party 2024
1	Aberdeenshire West and Kincardine	Conservative Party	0.79%	Conservative Party
2	Dumfries and Galloway	Conservative Party	1.48%	Conservative Party
3	Aberdeenshire North and Moray East	Conservative Party	2.61%	Scottish National Party
4	Edinburgh West	Liberal Democrats	2.62%	Liberal Democrats
5	Gordon and Buchan (Note: Gordon was won by the SNP in 2019, but is notionally a Conservative seat under new boundaries)	Conservative Party	3.39%	Conservative Party
6	Dumfriesshire, Clydesdale and Tweeddale	Conservative Party	4.26%	Conservative Party
7	Berwickshire, Roxburgh and Selkirk	Conservative Party	4.84%	Conservative Party
8	Orkney and Shetland	Liberal Democrats	5.41%	Liberal Democrats
9	Edinburgh South	Labour Party	10.18%	Labour Party

Other seats the SNP is targeting
Rank	Constituency	Winning party 2019	Swing required	Winning party 2024
–	North East Fife	Scottish National Party	–	Liberal Democrats
–	Caithness, Sutherland and Easter Ross	Scottish National Party	–	Liberal Democrats
–	Rutherglen	Scottish National Party	–	Labour Party

=== Plaid Cymru ===
Seats needing smallest swing to be won by Plaid Cymru
Rank	Constituency	Winning party 2019	Swing required	Winning party 2024
1	Ynys Mon	Conservative Party	3.48%	Plaid Cymru
2	Caerfyrddin	Conservative Party	4.25%	Plaid Cymru
3	Llanelli	Labour Party	9.53%	Labour Party
4	Caerphilly	Labour Party	14.59%	Labour Party
5	Pontypridd	Labour Party	17.87%	Labour Party
6	Neath and Swansea East	Labour Party	19.70%	Labour Party

=== Green Party ===
Seats needing smallest swing to be won by Green Party of England and Wales
Rank	Constituency	Winning party 2019	Swing required	Winning party 2024
1	Bristol Central	Labour Party	16.23%	Green Party of England and Wales
2	Isle of Wight West	Conservative Party	19.30%	Labour Party
6	Frome and East Somerset	Conservative Party	21.61%	Liberal Democrats
7	Isle of Wight East	Conservative Party	21.70%	Conservative Party
8	Hampstead and Highgate	Labour Party	21.99%	Labour Party

Other seats England & Wales Greens are targeting
Rank	Constituency	Winning party 2019	Swing required	Winning party 2024
82	Waveney Valley	Conservative Party	26.45%	Green Party of England and Wales
–	North Herefordshire	Conservative Party	–	Green Party of England and Wales

Scottish Greens target seats
Rank	Constituency	Winning party 2019	Swing required	Winning party 2024
3	Edinburgh North and Leith	Scottish National Party	20.26%	Labour Party
5	Dunfermline and Dollar	Scottish National Party	21.35%	Labour Party
9	East Kilbride and Strathaven	Scottish National Party	22.24%	Labour Party
10	Livingston	Scottish National Party	22.34%	Labour Party
11	Bathgate and Linlithgow	Scottish National Party	22.46%	Labour Party
12	Edinburgh South West	Scottish National Party	22.60%	Labour Party

Green Party Northern Ireland target seat
Rank	Constituency	Winning party 2019	Swing required	Winning party 2024
4	West Tyrone	Sinn Féin	20.53%	Sinn Féin

=== Northern Irish parties ===
Marginal seats requiring swings of under 10%:

Ulster Unionist Party
Rank	Constituency	Winning party 2019	Swing required	Winning party 2024
1	Fermanagh and South Tyrone	Sinn Féin	0.49%	Sinn Féin
2	South Antrim	Democratic Unionist Party	3.56%	Ulster Unionist Party

Sinn Féin
Rank	Constituency	Winning party 2019	Swing required	Winning party 2024
1	Upper Bann	Democratic Unionist Party	8.05%	Democratic Unionist Party

Democratic Unionist Party
Rank	Constituency	Winning party 2019	Swing required	Winning party 2024
1	North Down	Alliance Party of Northern Ireland	3.09%	Independent
2	Belfast North	Sinn Féin	3.88%	Sinn Féin
3	South Down	Sinn Féin	9.06%	Sinn Féin
4	West Tyrone	Sinn Féin	9.20%	Sinn Féin

Social Democratic and Labour Party
Rank	Constituency	Winning party 2019	Swing required	Winning party 2024
1	South Down	Sinn Féin	1.80%	Sinn Féin

Alliance Party of Northern Ireland
Rank	Constituency	Winning party 2019	Swing required	Winning party 2024
1	Belfast East	Democratic Unionist Party	2.91%	Democratic Unionist Party
2	Strangford	Democratic Unionist Party	7.07%	Democratic Unionist Party
3	East Antrim	Democratic Unionist Party	7.96%	Democratic Unionist Party
4	Lagan Valley	Democratic Unionist Party	8.12%	Alliance Party of Northern Ireland

== See also ==
- List of marginal seats before the 2019 United Kingdom general election
- List of marginal seats before the 2017 United Kingdom general election
- List of marginal seats before the 2015 United Kingdom general election
