= List of marginal seats before the 2017 United Kingdom general election =

The 2017 general election was called by Prime Minister Theresa May on 18 April that year, and held 51 days later on 8 June. 'Election Polling' marked the following as each of the parties' key target seats, ones that were held by a low margin and could feasibly be won by a different party than in the 2015 election

== List by party ==
=== Conservative ===
Conservative target seats
Rank	Constituency	Winning party 2015	Swing required	Winning party 2017
1	City of Chester	Labour	0.09%	Labour
2	Ealing Central & Acton	Labour	0.27%	Labour
3	Berwickshire, Roxburgh and Selkirk	SNP	0.30%	Conservative
4	Brentford and Isleworth	Labour	0.41%	Labour
5	Halifax	Labour	0.49%	Labour
6	Wirral West	Labour	0.50%	Labour
7	Ilford North	Labour	0.60%	Labour
8	Newcastle-under-Lyme	Labour	0.76%	Labour
9	Barrow and Furness	Labour	0.92%	Labour
10	Wolverhampton South West	Labour	1.00%	Labour
11	Hampstead and Kilburn	Labour	1.05%	Labour
12	Enfield North	Labour	1.18%	Labour
13	Hove	Labour	1.18%	Labour
14	Dewsbury	Labour	1.35%	Labour
15	Southport	Liberal Democrats	1.50%	Conservative
16	Lancaster and Fleetwood	Labour	1.50%	Labour
17	Carshalton and Wallington	Liberal Democrats	1.52%	Liberal Democrats
18	North East Derbyshire	Labour	1.96%	Conservative
19	Richmond Park	Liberal Democrats (Note: Elected in the 2016 by-election)	2.25%	Conservative
20	Harrow West	Labour	2.37%	Labour
21	Bridgend	Labour	2.44%	Labour
22	Middlesbrough South and Cleveland East	Labour	2.48%	Conservative
23	Westminster North	Labour	2.50%	Labour
24	Walsall North	Labour	2.63%	Conservative
25	Wrexham	Labour	2.80%	Labour
26	Birmingham Northfield	Labour	2.95%	Labour
27	Wakefield	Labour	3.04%	Labour

=== Labour ===
Labour target seats
Rank	Constituency	Winning party 2015	Swing required	Winning party 2017
1	Gower	Conservative	0.03%	Labour
2	Derby North	Conservative	0.05%	Labour
3	Croydon Central	Conservative	0.16%	Labour
4	Vale of Clwyd	Conservative	0.34%	Labour
5	Bury North	Conservative	0.42%	Labour
6	Morley and Outwood	Conservative	0.44%	Conservative
7	Thurrock	Conservative	0.54%	Conservative
8	Plymouth Sutton and Devonport	Conservative	0.55%	Labour
9	Brighton Kemptown	Conservative	0.76%	Labour
10	Bolton West	Conservative	0.82%	Conservative
11	Weaver Vale	Conservative	0.86%	Labour
12	Telford	Conservative	0.90%	Conservative
13	Bedford	Conservative	1.19%	Labour
14	Plymouth Moor View	Conservative	1.20%	Conservative
15	Lincoln	Conservative	1.54%	Labour
16	Peterborough	Conservative	2.04%	Labour
17	Cardiff North	Conservative	2.09%	Labour
18	Sheffield Hallam	Liberal Democrats	2.12%	Labour
19	Corby	Conservative	2.15%	Conservative
20	Waveney	Conservative	2.31%	Conservative
21	Warrington South	Conservative	2.32%	Labour
22	Southampton Itchen	Conservative	2.59%	Conservative
23	Keighley	Conservative	3.11%	Labour
24	Warwickshire North	Conservative	3.14%	Conservative
25	Carlisle	Conservative	3.26%	Conservative
26	Renfrewshire East	SNP	3.28%	Conservative
27	Leeds North West	Liberal Democrats	3.35%	Labour

=== Liberal Democrats ===
Liberal Democrat target seats
Rank	Constituency	Winning party 2015	Swing required	Winning party 2017
1	Cambridge	Labour	0.58%	Labour
2	Eastbourne	Conservative	0.69%	Liberal Democrats
3	Lewes	Conservative	1.07%	Conservative
4	Thornbury and Yate	Conservative	1.54%	Conservative
5	Twickenham	Conservative	1.63%	Liberal Democrats
6	East Dunbartonshire	SNP	1.97%	Liberal Democrats
7	Kingston and Surbiton	Conservative	2.39%	Liberal Democrats
8	St Ives	Conservative	2.56%	Conservative
9	Edinburgh West	SNP	2.93%	Liberal Democrats
10	Torbay	Conservative	3.42%	Conservative
11	Sutton and Cheam	Conservative	3.93%	Conservative
12	Bath	Conservative	4.06%	Liberal Democrats
13	Burnley	Labour	4.08%	Labour
14	Bermondsey and Old Southwark	Labour	4.36%	Labour
15	Yeovil	Conservative	4.67%	Conservative
16	North East Fife	SNP	4.80%	SNP
17	Caithness, Sutherland and Easter Ross	SNP	5.62%	Liberal Democrats
18	Colchester	Conservative	5.74%	Conservative
19	Cheltenham	Conservative	6.06%	Conservative
20	Cheadle	Conservative	6.08%	Conservative
21	Berwick-upon-Tweed	Conservative	6.08%	Conservative
22	Ross, Skye and Lochaber	SNP	6.13%	SNP
23	Portsmouth South	Conservative	6.25%	Labour
24	Brecon and Radnorshire	Conservative	6.37%	Conservative
25	Cardiff Central	Labour	6.37%	Labour
26	Devon North	Conservative	6.44%	Conservative
27	Wells	Conservative	6.66%	Conservative

=== SNP ===
SNP target seats
Rank	Constituency	Winning party 2015	Swing required	Winning party 2017
1	Dumfriesshire, Clydesdale and Tweeddale	Conservative	0.77%	Conservative
2	Orkney and Shetland	Liberal Democrats	1.80%	Liberal Democrats
3	Edinburgh South	Labour	2.68%	Labour

=== Green ===
Green Party target seats
Rank	Constituency	Winning party 2015	Swing required	Winning party 2017
1	Bristol West	Labour	4.4%	Labour

=== Plaid Cymru ===
Plaid Cymru target seats
Rank	Constituency	Winning party 2015	Swing required	Winning party 2017
1	Ynys Môn	Labour	0.35%	Labour

=== Sinn Féin ===
Sinn Féin target seats
Rank	Constituency	Winning party 2015	Swing required	Winning party 2017
1	Fermanagh and South Tyrone	UUP	0.52%	Sinn Féin

=== DUP ===
Sinn Féin target seats
Rank	Constituency	Winning party 2015	Swing required	Winning party 2017
1	Belfast South	SDLP	1.16%	DUP

== See also ==
- List of marginal seats before the 2024 United Kingdom general election
- List of marginal seats before the 2019 United Kingdom general election
- List of marginal seats before the 2015 United Kingdom general election
