= List of marginal seats before the 2015 United Kingdom general election =

This article describes the likely or potential target seats at the United Kingdom general election of 2015 that was held on 7 May 2015.

In January 2013, Labour published its list of 106 target seats for the next election. UKIP's list of 12 target seats was reported in August 2014, and others external to UKIP have highlighted seats where UKIP may be strongest. A list of Conservative non-target seats was deduced in February 2015. The Green Party of England & Wales describe having 12 target constituencies, including their one current seat.

Below are the most marginal seats listed by the party in second for those parties which won seats at the 2005 or 2010 general elections, ranked by the percentage swing required. These may not be the seats where parties choose to target their resources. Opinion polling in individual constituencies is also another indicator for possible target seats.

== List by party ==
=== Conservative ===
Conservative target seats
Rank	Constituency	Winning party 2010	Swing required	Winning party 2015
1	Hampstead and Kilburn	Labour	0.04%	Labour
2	Bolton West	Labour	0.10%	Conservative
3	Solihull	Liberal Democrats	0.16%	Conservative
4	Southampton Itchen	Labour	0.22%	Conservative
5	Mid Dorset and North Poole	Liberal Democrats	0.29%	Conservative
6	Wirral South	Labour	0.66%	Labour
7	Derby North	Labour	0.68%	Conservative
8	Wells	Liberal Democrats	0.72%	Conservative
9	Dudley North	Labour	0.84%	Labour
10	Great Grimsby	Labour	1.08%	Labour
11	Morley and Outwood	Labour	1.13%	Conservative
12	Telford	Labour	1.19%	Conservative
13	Walsall North	Labour	1.37%	Labour
14	St Austell and Newquay	Liberal Democrats	1.39%	Conservative
15	Somerton and Frome	Liberal Democrats	1.50%	Conservative
16	Birmingham Edgbaston	Labour	1.54%	Labour
17	Sutton and Cheam	Liberal Democrats	1.66%	Conservative
18	Halifax	Labour	1.69%	Labour
19	Newcastle-under-Lyme	Labour	1.80%	Labour
20	Middlesbrough South and East Cleveland	Labour	1.82%	Labour
21	Wakefield	Labour	1.82%	Labour
22	St. Ives	Liberal Democrats	1.87%	Conservative
23	Plymouth Moor View	Labour	1.91%	Conservative
24	Gedling	Labour	1.93%	Labour
25	Eltham	Labour	1.98%	Labour
26	Walsall South	Labour	2.15%	Labour
27	Nottingham South	Labour	2.17%	Labour

=== Labour ===
Labour target seats
Rank	Constituency	Winning party 2010	Swing required	Winning party 2015
1	North Warwickshire	Conservative	0.05%	Conservative
2	Thurrock	Conservative	0.10%	Conservative
3	Hendon	Conservative	0.12%	Conservative
4	Cardiff North	Conservative	0.20%	Conservative
5	Sherwood	Conservative	0.22%	Conservative
6	Norwich South	Liberal Democrats	0.32%	Labour
7	Stockton South	Conservative	0.33%	Conservative
8	Broxtowe	Conservative	0.37%	Conservative
9	Lancaster and Fleetwood	Conservative	0.39%	Labour
10	Bradford East	Liberal Democrats	0.45%	Labour
11	Amber Valley	Conservative	0.58%	Conservative
12	Waveney	Conservative	0.75%	Conservative
13	Wolverhampton South West	Conservative	0.85%	Labour
14	Morecambe and Lunesdale	Conservative	1.00%	Conservative
15	Carlisle	Conservative	1.01%	Conservative
16	Stroud	Conservative	1.12%	Conservative
17	Weaver Vale	Conservative	1.13%	Conservative
18	Lincoln	Conservative	1.16%	Conservative
19	Brighton Pavilion	Green	1.21%	Green
20	Plymouth Sutton and Devonport	Conservative	1.31%	Conservative
21	Dewsbury	Conservative	1.41%	Labour
22	Warrington South	Conservative	1.42%	Conservative
23	Brent Central	Liberal Democrats	1.48%	Labour
24	Bedford	Conservative	1.50%	Conservative
25	Brighton Kemptown	Conservative	1.56%	Conservative
26	Pudsey	Conservative	1.69%	Conservative
27	Brentford and Isleworth	Conservative	1.82%	Labour

=== Liberal Democrats ===
Liberal Democrats target seats
Rank	Constituency	Winning party 2010	Swing required	Winning party 2015
1	Camborne and Redruth	Conservative	0.08%	Conservative
2	Oldham East and Saddleworth (Note: As compared to the 2010 general election result, not the 2011 by-election result.)	Labour	0.12%	Labour
3	Oxford West and Abingdon	Conservative	0.16%	Conservative
4	Ashfield	Labour	0.20%	Labour
5	Sheffield Central	Labour	0.20%	Labour
6	Edinburgh South	Labour	0.36%	Labour
7	Truro and Falmouth	Conservative	0.45%	Conservative
8	Newton Abbot	Conservative	0.55%	Conservative
9	Chesterfield	Labour	0.60%	Labour
10	Swansea West	Labour	0.71%	Labour
11	Kingston upon Hull North	Labour	0.96%	Labour
12	Rochdale	Labour	0.97%	Labour
13	Harrogate and Knaresborough	Conservative	0.98%	Conservative
14	Watford	Conservative	1.29%	Conservative
15	Hampstead and Kilburn	Labour	1.51%	Labour
16	Montgomeryshire	Conservative	1.75%	Conservative
17	Edinburgh North and Leith	Labour	1.82%	SNP
18	St. Albans	Conservative	2.19%	Conservative
19	Newport East	Labour	2.39%	Labour
20	Weston-super-Mare	Conservative	2.56%	Conservative
21	Hereford and Herefordshire South	Conservative	2.57%	Conservative
22	Torridge and West Devon	Conservative	2.68%	Conservative
23	Winchester	Conservative	2.73%	Conservative
24	Northampton North	Conservative	3.09%	Conservative
25	South East Cornwall	Conservative	3.25%	Conservative
26	Bristol North West	Conservative	3.25%	Conservative
27	City of Durham	Labour	3.32%	Labour

=== SNP ===
SNP target seats
Rank	Constituency	Winning party 2010	Swing required	Winning party 2015
1	Ochil and South Perthshire	Labour	5.14%	SNP

=== Plaid Cymru ===
Plaid Cymru target seats
Rank	Constituency	Winning party 2010	Swing required	Winning party 2015		
1	Ynys Môn	Labour	3.55%	Labour	Labour	Labour

=== Green Party ===
Green Party target seats
Rank	Constituency	Winning party 2010	Swing required	Winning party 2015		
1	Norwich South	Liberal Democrats	7.20%	Labour	Labour	Labour

=== Respect Party ===
Respect Party target seats
Rank	Constituency	Winning party 2010	Swing required	Winning party 2015		
1	Birmingham Hall Green	Labour	3.9%	Labour	Labour	Labour

=== Northern Ireland ===
	Sinn Féin targets	Swing required	SDLP targets	Swing required	DUP targets	Swing required	Alliance targets	Swing required
1	Belfast North (DUP)	3.01%	Newry and Armagh (SF)	9.3%	Belfast East (Alliance)	2.22%	Belfast South (SDLP)	15.00%

== See also ==
- List of marginal seats before the 2024 United Kingdom general election
- List of marginal seats before the 2019 United Kingdom general election
- List of marginal seats before the 2017 United Kingdom general election
