= Hilton Dawson =

British politician

Member of Parliament for Lancaster and Wyre
- In office 1 May 1997 – 11 April 2005
- Preceded by: Constituency established
- Succeeded by: Ben Wallace

Personal details
- Born: 30 September 1953 (age 72) Northumberland, England
- Party: Your Party (since 2025)
- Other political affiliations: North East Party (2014–2025); Labour (1979–2014)
- Spouse: Susan Williams
- Education: Lancaster University, University of Warwick

Thomas Hilton Dawson (born 30 September 1953) is a British politician who was the Labour Party Member of Parliament (MP) for Lancaster and Wyre from 1997 until 2005.

Dawson became the chairman of the North East Party in 2014, and was the party's candidate in the 2021 Hartlepool by-election.

== Early life ==
Dawson was born on 30 September 1953 in Northumberland, England. He is the son of Harry Dawson and his wife Sally, both teachers. He attended Ashington County Grammar School (now known as Ashington Academy) on Green Lane in Ashington. At the University of Warwick, he gained a BA in Politics and Philosophy in 1975. From Lancaster University, he gained a Diploma in Social Work.

He worked as a social work manager from 1983 to 1997, involving children's homes, fostering and adoption, and day care.

== Parliamentary career ==
Dawson was elected as the Labour MP for the newly created Lancaster and Wyre constituency at the 1997 general election, which saw his party return to power after 18 years in opposition. He was re-elected for the marginal seat at the 2001 general election.

In 2004, Dawson announced he would not be seeking re-election at the next general election, seeking to return to work in children's services. The local Constituency Labour Party selected Anne Sacks as its new candidate, but the seat was won by the Conservative Party candidate, Ben Wallace, with a 4.5% swing away from Labour.

== After Parliament ==
Dawson became CEO of Shaftesbury Young People. In April 2009, he was appointed chief executive of the British Association of Social Workers.

Hilton left BASW in January 2013 by mutual agreement, and now runs his own company called Northumbria People. In March 2013 he published Frank Renner's Bairns – Looking at the world through the lives of a Northumbrian Family. He is chair of the Newbiggin by the Sea Genealogy Project.

In 2014, Dawson left the Labour Party and became the chairman of the North East Party. In March 2021, Dawson was selected as the party's candidate for the 2021 Hartlepool by-election. He received 163 votes, placing tenth of sixteen candidates.

In 2025, Dawson spoke at the Your Party Founding Conference.

== Personal life ==
Dawson married Susan Williams on 11 August 1973. They have two daughters and four grandchildren. He is a supporter of Sunderland.
