= Cat Smith =

British Labour politician (born 1985)

Cat Smith MP
- Official portrait, 2026

Chair of the Procedure Committee
- Incumbent
- Assumed office 11 September 2024
- Preceded by: Dame Karen Bradley

Chair of the Petitions Committee
- In office 18 October 2023 – 30 May 2024
- Preceded by: Catherine McKinnell
- Succeeded by: Jamie Stone
Shadow portfolios
Shadow Cabinet
2016–2021	Young People and Democracy
Shadow Frontbench
2016–2017	Deputy Commons Leader
2015–2016	Women and Equalities

Member of Parliament for Lancaster and Wyre Lancaster and Fleetwood (2015–2024)
- Incumbent
- Assumed office 7 May 2015
- Preceded by: Eric Ollerenshaw
- Majority: 9,253 (21.6%)

Personal details
- Born: Catherine Jane Smith; 16 June 1985 (age 41) Barrow-in-Furness, Cumbria, England
- Party: Labour
- Other political affiliations: Socialist Campaign Group
- Spouse: Ben Soffa (m. 2016; sep. 2020)
- Domestic partner: David Linden (2021–present)
- Education: Lancaster University (BA)
- Website: catsmith.co.uk

Catherine Jane Smith (born 16 June 1985) is a British Labour Party politician who has served as a Member of Parliament (MP) since 2015, representing Lancaster and Wyre since 2024 after her former constituency, Lancaster and Fleetwood, was abolished. She was a member of the shadow cabinets led by Jeremy Corbyn and Keir Starmer from 2016 to 2021 as Shadow Secretary of State, previously Shadow Minister, for Young People and Democracy.

== Early life and education ==
Smith was born in Barrow-in-Furness. She has said that she "didn't have a political upbringing". Her mother was a Methodist and, through going to church with her, Smith became involved with youth movements in the church. Her father was a trade unionist. She attended Parkview School (in 2009, this merged into Furness Academy) and Barrow Sixth Form College. In 2003, she began studying for a bachelor's degree at Lancaster University. She was a member of Cartmel College and initially studied religious studies, but switched to a joint honours degree in sociology and gender studies, from which she graduated in 2006. Smith was elected the Women's Officer for Lancaster University Students' Union, a sabbatical role, and served in the 2006–2007 academic year.

== Political career ==
=== Early political career ===
Smith first stood for election as a Labour Party candidate for University ward on Lancaster City Council in 2007. She came fifth with 98 votes. She supported John McDonnell for leader in the 2007 Labour Party leadership election, which was occasioned by Prime Minister Tony Blair's resignation; Gordon Brown won unopposed. Smith said it was more important to her to see multiple candidates stand than for McDonnell specifically to win. In the same year, she was a candidate for the Labour Party National Executive Committee (NEC) Youth Representative.

Smith worked as an office manager for the Christian Socialist Movement from 2007 to 2009 before working as a research and constituency worker for three Members of Parliament (MPs) from 2009 to 2012: Jeremy Corbyn, Katy Clark, and Bob Marshall-Andrews. Smith was the Labour Party candidate for the Wyre and Preston North constituency in the 2010 general election, the first in which it was contested, but she was unsuccessful and came in a narrow third behind the Liberal Democrat candidate. In 2020, she told Lancs Live, "I had been called because there was no Wyre and Preston candidate for Labour... I wasn't expecting to win, but I was happy to make the case for Labour to the constituents."

In 2010–2011, Smith was chair of Compass Youth. In 2011, a majority of the Compass Youth committee, including Smith, resigned in protest at Compass' decision to become a cross-party body. The resigning members set up a new organisation called Next Generation Labour, which Smith chaired for a period. From 2012 to 2015, Smith worked as a campaigns and policy officer for the British Association of Social Workers (BASW). In 2013, she was selected as the Labour candidate to contest the Lancaster and Fleetwood constituency at the next election.

=== Member of Parliament ===
Smith won Lancaster and Fleetwood in the 2015 general election, defeating the Conservative incumbent Eric Ollerenshaw. Smith became a member of the Socialist Campaign Group within the Parliamentary Labour Party after her election. Following Labour's overall defeat, however, party leader Ed Miliband resigned. In the ensuing leadership election, Smith was a supporter of Jeremy Corbyn's candidacy and was one of 36 Labour MPs to nominate him for leader. In June 2015, Smith was elected as chair of the All-party Parliamentary Group on Cuba. In July, she was one of 48 Labour MPs to defy the whip and vote against the Welfare Reform and Work Bill.

Following Corbyn's election as Labour leader, Smith was appointed as a shadow minister in the Women & Equalities Office, working under Shadow Secretary of State for Women and Equalities Kate Green.

She criticised the 2016 European Union referendum, saying that younger people preferred to remain in the EU, while the majority result was to leave.

==== Front bench ====
On 27 June 2016, Smith entered the Shadow Cabinet as Shadow Minister for Voter Engagement and Youth Affairs. This followed on from a series of resignations of shadow ministers who had lost confidence in Corbyn's leadership; Smith took over from Gloria De Piero, one of the first shadow ministers to resign. On 6 April 2020, Keir Starmer reappointed Smith as Shadow Minister for Young People and Voter Engagement.

In addition to her other duties, Smith served as Shadow Deputy Leader of the House of Commons, in which role she made her debut at the Despatch Box on 20 December 2016.

On 29 November 2021, during a shadow cabinet reshuffle, Smith resigned from her role on the front bench. She suggested that Starmer's office had offered her the opportunity to remain in her brief, but she declined, citing concerns over the ongoing suspension of former party leader Jeremy Corbyn from the Parliamentary Labour Party and lack of frontbench support for proportional representation.

==== Expenses ====
On 24 May 2016, Lancashire Constabulary announced that an investigation had been opened following allegations that Smith broke election spending laws by spending thousands of pounds more than she declared, relating to a visit by a nationally organised Labour "battlebus" to her constituency. In June 2016, Lancashire Constabulary were granted a year-long extension to investigate Smith's election expenses, and in November 2016, they cleared Smith of any wrongdoing.

== Personal life ==
Smith married her partner of eleven years, Ben Soffa, in September 2016. In July 2018, Smith gave birth to the couple's son. As of 2021, Smith was in a relationship with SNP former MP David Linden. Smith is bisexual.

Smith is a Methodist, and a co-founder of Christians for Choice, a project of the organisation Abortion Rights.

She is a member of the Poulton & Wyre Railway Society.

Parliament of the United Kingdom
Preceded by Eric Ollerenshaw	Member of Parliament for Lancaster and Fleetwood; 2015–2024	Constituency abolished
New constituency	Member of Parliament for Lancaster and Wyre; 2024–present	Incumbent
Political offices
Preceded by Gloria De Piero as Shadow Minister for Young People and Voter Registration	Shadow Minister for Voter Engagement and Youth Affairs / for Young People and Democracy; 2016–2021	
Political offices
Preceded by Catherine McKinnell	Chair of the Petitions Committee; 2023–2024	Succeeded by Jamie Stone
