= Marginal constituencies in the 2005 United Kingdom general election =

This is a list of marginal seats in the United Kingdom after the results in the 2005 General Election. At the 2010 General Election, boundary changes under the Fifth Periodic Review of Westminster constituencies applied affecting some of these seats.

== Conservative – Liberal Democrat marginals ==
Constituencies where the Conservative Party held a marginal lead over the Liberal Democrats:

Constituency	Majority	%
Romsey	125	0.3%
Guildford	347	0.7%
Taunton Deane	573	1.0%
Eastbourne	1,124	2.4%
Totnes	1,947	3.8%
North Dorset	2,244	4.2%
Weston-Super-Mare	2,079	4.2%
Ludlow	2,027	4.4%
West Dorset	2,461	4.6%
West Worcestershire	2,475	5.2%
Torridge and West Devon	3,236	5.5%
Wells	3,040	5.8%
Newbury	3,460	6.4%
Harborough	3,892	8.2%
Orpington	4,947	9.0%
North Wiltshire	5,303	9.5%
Westbury	5,346	9.6%
East Hampshire	5,509	10.4%
Haltemprice and Howden	5,116	10.7%
South West Surrey	5,711	10.9%
Aldershot	5,334	11.0%
Woodspring	6,016	11.6%
Mid Sussex	5,890	11.9%
Bournemouth West	4,031	11.8%
Maidenhead	6,231	13.5%
South Suffolk	6,606	13.6%
Bournemouth East	5,244	13.9%
Woking	6,612	14.4%
New Forest East	6,551	14.5%
Poole	5,988	14.8%

== Labour – Liberal Democrat marginals ==
Constituencies where the Labour Party held a marginal lead over the Liberal Democrats:

Constituency	Majority	%
Edinburgh South	405	0.9%
Islington South and Finsbury	484	1.6%
Oxford East	963	2.3%
Watford	1,148	2.3%
Aberdeen South	1,348	3.2%
Edinburgh North and Leith	2,153	5.0%
City of Durham	3,274	7.4%
Oldham East and Saddleworth	3,590	8.3%
Norwich South	3,653	8.7%
Leicester South	3,717	8.8%
Bradford North	3,511	10.2%
Newcastle upon Tyne Central	3,982	11.1%
Swansea West	4,269	12.9%

== Labour – Conservative marginals ==
Constituencies where the Labour Party held a marginal lead over the Conservative Party:

Constituency	Majority	%
Crawley	37	0.1%
Sittingbourne and Sheppey	79	0.2%
Harlow	97	0.2%
Battersea	163	0.4%
Medway	213	0.5%
Warwick and Leamington	266	0.5%
Gillingham	254	0.6%
Stroud	350	0.6%
Hove	420	0.9%
Selby	467	0.9%
Stourbridge	407	1.0%
Dartford	706	1.5%
High Peak	735	1.5%
South Thanet	664	1.6%
Finchley and Golders Green	741	1.7%
City of Chester	917	2.0%
Cardiff North	1,146	2.5%
Wirral West	1,097	2.7%
Calder Valley	1,367	2.9%
Portsmouth North	1,139	3.0%
Burton	1,421	3.0%
South Swindon	1,353	3.1%
Colne Valley	1,501	3.1%
Corby	1,517	3.1%
Wansdyke	1,839	3.6%
South Dorset	1,812	3.7%
Vale of Glamorgan	1,808	3.8%
Harrow West	2,028	4.2%
Loughborough	1,996	4.3%
South Ribble	2,184	4.6%
Enfield North	1,920	4.7%
Hastings and Rye	2,026	4.7%
Stafford	2,121	4.7%
Broxtowe	2,296	4.7%
Carmarthen West and South Pembrokeshire	1,910	5.0%
Nuneaton	2,280	5.0%
Bolton West	2,064	5.1%
Pendle	2,180	5.3%
Chatham and Aylesford	2,332	5.5%
Staffordshire Moorlands	2,438	5.5%
North Swindon	2,571	5.7%
Dumfries and Galloway	2,922	5.7%
Tamworth	2,569	5.9%
Cleethorpes	2,642	6.1%
Birmingham Edgbaston	2,349	6.2%
Hendon	2,699	6.5%
Bury North	2,926	6.6%
Redditch	2,716	6.7%
Brigg and Goole	2,894	6.8%
Worcester	3,144	6.8%
Brighton Kemptown	2,737	6.9%
Wolverhampton South West	3,144	6.9%
Basildon	3,142	7.3%
Great Yarmouth	3,055	7.4%
Stevenage	3,139	7.5%
Warrington South	3,515	7.5%
Bedford	3,383	8.0%
Milton Keynes South West	4,010	8.1%
South Derbyshire	4,495	8.1%
Gloucester	4,271	8.2%
Bradford West	3,026	8.3%
Rossendale and Darwen	3,676	8.3%
Halifax	3,417	8.6%
Derby North	3,757	8.6%
Gedling	3,811	8.6%
Conwy	3,081	9.2%
Eltham	3,276	9.3%
Harrow East	4,730	9.3%
Wirral South	3,724	9.4%
Northampton North	3,960	9.4%
North West Leicestershire	4,477	9.5%
Brentford and Isleworth	4,411	9.6%
Elmet	4,528	9.6%
Tynemouth	4,143	9.7%
Hampstead and Highgate	3,729	9.8%
Dover	4,941	10.3%
Halesowen and Rowley Regis	4,337	10.5%
Keighley	4,852	10.5%
Plymouth Sutton	4,109	10.8%
Dudley South	4,244	10.8%
Stirling	4,767	10.9%
Bolton North East	4,103	11.1%
Reading West	4,672	11.1%
Amber Valley	5,275	11.1%
Morecambe and Lunesdale	4,768	11.5%
Brighton Pavilion	5,030	11.5%
Norwich North	5,459	11.6%
Blackpool North and Fleetwood	5,062	11.7%
Wakefield	5,154	11.9%
Waveney	5,915	11.9%
Dewsbury	4,615	12.0%
Lincoln	4,613	12.5%
Pudsey	5,870	12.6%
Leeds North East	5,262	12.7%
Ipswich	5,332	12.7%
Stockton South	6,139	12.7%
Tooting	5,381	12.9%
Dudley North	5,432	13.1%
Ealing North	6,159	13.5%
Ealing Acton and Shepherd's Bush	5,520	13.9%
Exeter	7,665	13.9%
East Renfrewshire	6,657	14.0%
Erewash	7,084	14.0%
West Lancashire	6,084	14.1%
Sherwood	6,652	14.1%
Hyndburn	5,587	14.2%
Vale of Clwyd	4,669	14.4%
Luton South	5,650	14.5%
Thurrock	6,375	14.6%
Batley and Spen	5,788	14.8%
Regent's Park and Kensington North	6,131	15.1%
Newport West	5,458	15.3%
Coventry South	6,255	15.4%
Ellesmere Port and Neston	6,486	15.4%
Chorley	7,625	15.4%
Telford	5,406	15.8%
Brent North	5,641	15.8%
Kingswood	7,873	15.9%
Carlisle	5,695	16.1%
Crosby	5,840	16.1%
Birmingham Hall Green	5,714	16.5%
Barrow and Furness	6,037	16.5%
Edinburgh South West	7,242	16.5%
Luton North	6,487	16.6%
Southampton Test	7,018	16.8%
Gower	6,703	17.0%
Bridgend	6,523	17.2%
Weaver Vale	6,855	17.4%
Workington	6,895	17.4%
Feltham and Heston	6,820	18.3%
Middlesbrough South and East Cleveland	8,000	18.3%
