= Lancaster and Wyre =

UK Parliament constituency (1997–2010, 2024 onwards)

Coordinates: 53.898°N 2.8126°W

- County constituency for the House of Commons
- Interactive map of boundaries since 2024
- Location within North West England
- County: Lancashire
- Electorate: 74,760 (2024)
- Major settlements: Lancaster, Garstang and Catterall

Current constituency
- Created: 2024
- Member of Parliament: Cat Smith (Labour)
- Seats: One
- Created from: Lancaster and Fleetwood, Wyre and Preston North

1997–2010
- Created from: Lancaster and Wyre
- Replaced by: Lancaster and Fleetwood, Wyre and Preston North

Lancaster and Wyre is a parliamentary constituency represented in the House of Commons of the Parliament of the United Kingdom since its recreation in 2024 by Cat Smith of the Labour Party. The seat was originally established in 1997 but was replaced by Lancaster and Fleetwood from 2010 to 2024, with Smith being the MP from 2015.

== Constituency profile ==
Lancaster and Wyre is a constituency located in Lancashire. It covers the city of Lancaster and most of the rural Borough of Wyre to its south, which is named after the river that forms its western boundary. Other settlements in the constituency include the ancient market town of Garstang and the villages of Knott End-on-Sea, Catterall and Hambleton. Lancaster is a city with a population of around 54,000 people and has a long history dating back to the Roman era. The city was a centre for slave trading in the 18th century and has a history of maritime industry, including shipbuilding. The eastern part of the constituency lies within the Forest of Bowland, an upland area of fells and moors. The constituency contains Lancaster University, which has around 19,000 students. Lancaster has average levels of wealth and deprivation whilst the Wyre towns and villages are generally affluent. House prices are similar to the rest of North West England but lower than the national average.

Compared to the rest of the country, residents of Lancaster and Wyre are well-educated and have average rates of income and homeownership. A high proportion work in the education and healthcare sectors. White people made up 91% of the population at the 2021 census. At local council level, Lancaster is mostly represented by Green Party councillors with some Labour Party representation, whilst the Wyre district elected Conservative and Reform UK councillors. An estimated 51% of voters in Lancaster and Wyre supported leaving the European Union in the 2016 referendum, similar to the nationwide figure of 52%.

== History ==
This seat was originally created for the 1997 general election and was abolished at the 2010 general election. It was a marginal seat between the Labour and Conservative parties throughout its existence, and was the only seat gained by the Conservatives in the North West in the 2005 general election.

In the 2023 review of Westminster constituencies, the seat was re-established for the 2024 general election. Its boundaries are similar to those of the 1997–2010 version. The seat was won in 2024 for Labour by Cat Smith, who had been MP for Lancaster and Fleetwood from 2015 to 2024.

== Boundaries ==
=== 1997–2010 ===
Map of boundaries 1997–2010

The City of Lancaster wards of Bulk, Castle, Caton, Ellel, John O'Gaunt, Scotforth East, and Scotforth West, and the Borough of Wyre wards of Breck, Brock, Calder, Carleton, Catterall, Duchy, Garstang, Hambleton, Hardhorn, High Cross, Norcross, Pilling, Preesall, Staina, Tithebarn, and Wyresdale.

The Boundary Commission for England's proposals for parliamentary constituencies in Lancashire were completed in 2006. They proposed to split this seat into two. As a result, Lancaster was attached to another part of Wyre borough, over the River Wyre to the fishing port of Fleetwood. The new seat of Lancaster and Fleetwood represents the first time the two places have been linked for parliamentary reasons for many years.

The other seat was the new Wyre and Preston North. This seat was newly created, and the bringing together of Garstang, Thornton, Poulton-le-Fylde and the Fulwood and northern rural areas of Preston was unprecedented.

=== Current ===
Following the 2023 review of Westminster constituencies (based on the local authority ward structures in place on 1 December 2020), and taking into account the local government boundary review in the City of Lancaster which came into effect in May 2023, the re-established constituency is composed of the following electoral wards:

- The City of Lancaster wards of Bowerham, Bulk, Castle, Ellel, John O'Gaunt, Marsh, Scale Hall, Scotforth East, Scotforth West, Skerton (most), and University.
- The Borough of Wyre wards of Brock with Catterall, Calder, Garstang, Great Eccleston, Hambleton & Stalmine, Pilling, Preesall, and Wyresdale.

The constituency replaces Lancaster and Fleetwood – excluding the town of Fleetwood. It has been expanded to include the community of Skerton, transferred from Morecambe and Lunesdale, together with Garstang and surrounding rural areas, previously part of the Wyre and Preston North constituency (now abolished).

== Members of Parliament ==
Election	Member	Party
1997	Hilton Dawson	Labour
2005	Ben Wallace	Conservative
2010	constituency abolished: see Lancaster and Fleetwood and Wyre and Preston North	
2024	Cat Smith	Labour

Ben Wallace was selected to represent the Conservatives at the 2010 election in the successor seat of Wyre and Preston North.

== Elections ==
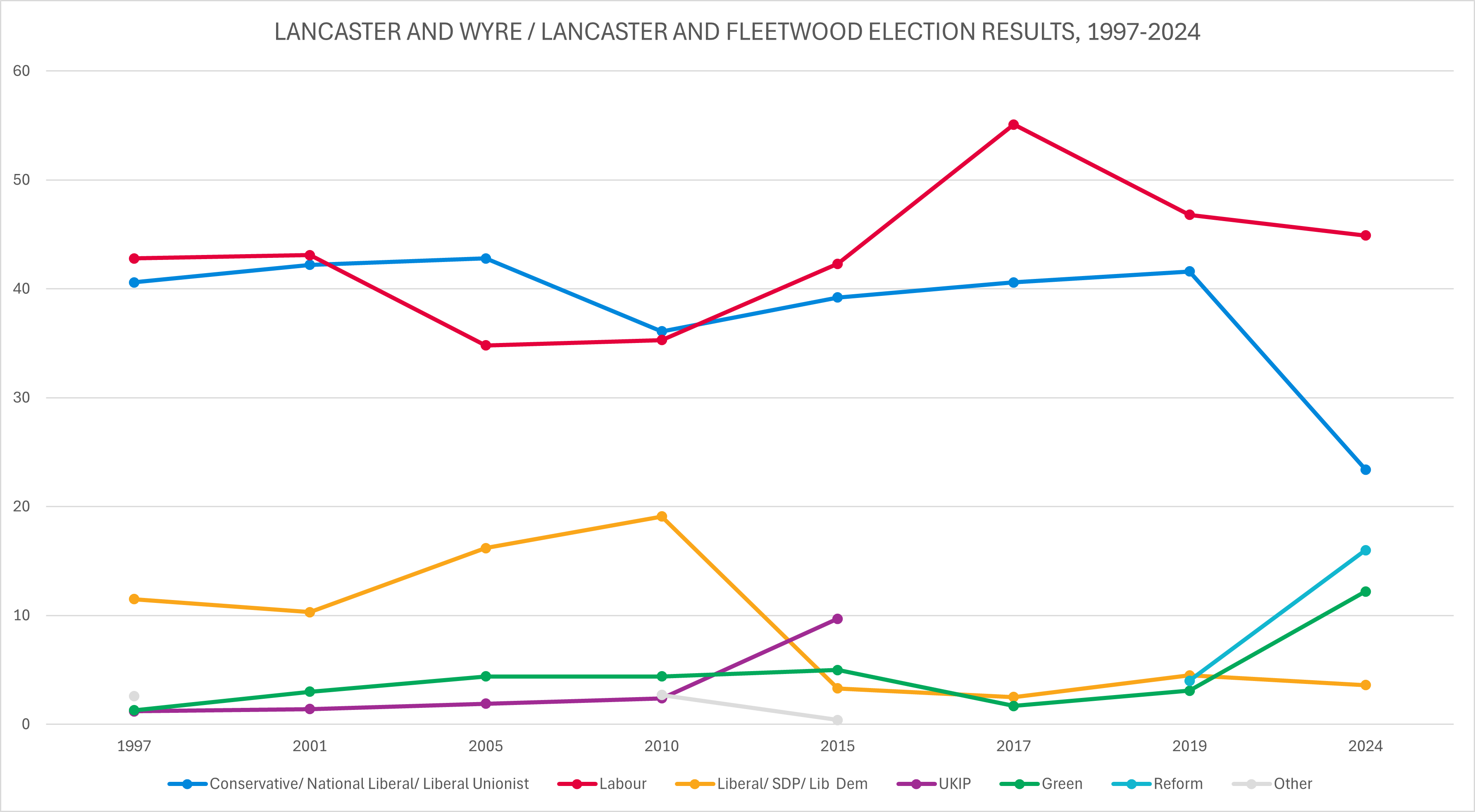
Election results 1997-2024

=== Elections in the 2020s ===
General election 2024: Lancaster and Wyre
Party	Candidate	Votes	%	±%
Labour	Cat Smith	19,315	44.9	+3.0
Conservative	Peter Cartridge	10,062	23.4	−24.6
Reform	Nigel Alderson	6,866	16.0	+14.2
Green	Jack Lenox	5,236	12.2	+7.8
Liberal Democrats	Matt Severn	1,529	3.6	−0.3
Majority		9,253	21.5	N/A
Turnout		43,008	58.0	−8.3
Registered electors		74,760		
Labour win (new seat)				

=== Elections in the 2000s ===
General election 2005: Lancaster and Wyre
Party	Candidate	Votes	%	±%
Conservative	Ben Wallace	22,266	42.8	+0.6
Labour	Anne Sacks	18,095	34.8	−8.3
Liberal Democrats	Stuart Langhorn	8,453	16.2	+5.9
Green	Jon Barry	2,278	4.4	+1.4
UKIP	John Mander	969	1.9	+0.5
Majority		4,171	8.0	N/A
Turnout		52,061	64.5	−1.4
Conservative gain from Labour		Swing		

General election 2001: Lancaster and Wyre
Party	Candidate	Votes	%	±%
Labour	Hilton Dawson	22,556	43.1	+0.3
Conservative	Steve Barclay	22,075	42.2	+1.6
Liberal Democrats	Elizabeth Scott	5,383	10.3	−1.2
Green	John Whitelegg	1,595	3.0	+1.7
UKIP	John Whittaker	741	1.4	+0.2
Majority		481	0.9	−1.3
Turnout		52,350	65.9	−8.9
Labour hold		Swing		

=== Elections in the 1990s ===
General election 1997: Lancaster and Wyre
Party	Candidate	Votes	%	±%
Labour	Hilton Dawson	25,173	42.8	+9.7
Conservative	Keith Mans	23,878	40.6	−11.6
Liberal Democrats	John Humberstone	6,802	11.5	−2.4
Referendum	Vivien Ivell	1,516	2.6	New
Green	Jon Barry	795	1.3	New
UKIP	John Whittaker	698	1.2	New
Majority		1,295	2.2	
Turnout		58,862	74.8	
Labour win (new seat)				

== See also ==
- Parliamentary constituencies in Lancashire
