= List of marginal seats before the 2019 United Kingdom general election =

The 2019 general election was held on 12 December 2019. These were the target seats for each of the political parties, according to results from the previous election in 2017.

== List by party ==
=== Conservative ===
Conservative target seats
Rank	Constituency	Winning party 2017	Swing required	Winning party 2019
1	Perth and North Perthshire	SNP	0.02%	SNP
2	Kensington	Labour	0.03%	Conservative
3	Dudley North	Labour	0.03%	Conservative
4	Newcastle-under-Lyme	Labour	0.03%	Conservative
5	Crewe and Nantwich	Labour	0.04%	Conservative
6	Canterbury	Labour	0.16%	Labour
7	Barrow and Furness	Labour	0.22%	Conservative
8	Keighley	Labour	0.24%	Conservative
9	Lanark and Hamilton East	SNP	0.26%	SNP
10	Ashfield	Labour	0.44%	Conservative
11	Stroud	Labour	0.54%	Conservative
12	Bishop Auckland	Labour	0.58%	Conservative
13	Peterborough	Labour	0.64%	Conservative
14	Oxford West and Abingdon	Liberal Democrats	0.68%	Liberal Democrats
15	Westmorland and Lonsdale	Liberal Democrats	0.75%	Liberal Democrats
16	Colne Valley	Labour	0.76%	Conservative
17	Ipswich	Labour	0.81%	Conservative
18	Bedford	Labour	0.81%	Labour
19	Stockton South	Labour	0.82%	Conservative
20	Edinburgh South West	SNP	1.11%	SNP

=== Labour ===
Labour target seats
Rank	Constituency	Winning party 2017	Swing required	Winning party 2019
1	Southampton Itchen	Conservative	0.03%	Conservative
2	Glasgow South West	SNP	0.08%	SNP
3	Glasgow East	SNP	0.10%	SNP
4	Arfon	Plaid Cymru	0.16%	Plaid Cymru
5	Airdrie and Shotts	SNP	0.26%	SNP
6	Pudsey	Conservative	0.31%	Conservative
7	Hastings and Rye	Conservative	0.32%	Conservative
8	Chipping Barnet	Conservative	0.32%	Conservative
9	Thurrock	Conservative	0.34%	Conservative
10	Lanark and Hamilton East	SNP	0.36%	SNP
11	Preseli Pembrokeshire	Conservative	0.37%	Conservative
12	Motherwell and Wishaw	SNP	0.38%	SNP
13	Inverclyde	SNP	0.49%	SNP
14	Calder Valley	Conservative	0.52%	Conservative
15	Norwich North	Conservative	0.55%	Conservative
16	Broxtowe	Conservative	0.78%	Conservative
17	Stoke-on-Trent South	Conservative	0.80%	Conservative
18	Telford	Conservative	0.81%	Conservative
19	Dunfermline and West Fife	SNP	0.83%	SNP
20	Bolton West	Conservative	0.92%	Conservative

=== Liberal Democrat ===
Lib Dem target seats
Rank	Constituency	Winning party 2017	Swing required	Winning party 2019
1	North East Fife	SNP	0.00%	Liberal Democrats
2	Richmond Park	Conservative	0.04%	Liberal Democrats
3	Ceredigion	Plaid Cymru	0.13%	Plaid Cymru
4	St Ives	Conservative	0.30%	Conservative
5	Sheffield Hallam	Labour	1.86%	Labour
6	Cheltenham	Conservative	2.25%	Conservative
7	North Devon	Conservative	3.89%	Conservative
8	Cheadle	Conservative	4.13%	Conservative
9	Leeds North West	Labour	4.56%	Labour
10	Lewes	Conservative	5.08%	Conservative

=== SNP ===
SNP target seats
Rank	Constituency	Winning party 2017	Swing required	Winning party 2019
1	Stirling	Conservative	0.15%	SNP
2	Rutherglen and Hamilton West	Labour	0.26%	SNP
3	Kirkcaldy and Cowdenbeath	Labour	0.28%	SNP
4	Glasgow North East	Labour	0.38%	SNP
5	Midlothian	Labour	0.98%	SNP
6	Coatbridge, Chryston and Bellshill	Labour	1.76%	SNP
7	Gordon	Conservative	2.43%	SNP
8	East Lothian	Labour	2.76%	SNP
9	Edinburgh West	Liberal Democrats	2.83%	Liberal Democrats
10	Ayr, Carrick and Cumnock	Conservative	3.00%	SNP

=== Plaid Cymru ===
Plaid Cymru targets
Rank	Constituency	Winning party 2017	Swing required	Winning party 2019
1	Ynys Môn	Labour	7.23%	Conservative
2	Llanelli	Labour	17.62%	Labour
3	Blaenau Gwent	Labour	18.38%	Labour
4	Caerphilly	Labour	20.01%	Labour
5	Rhondda	Labour	20.87%	Labour

=== Brexit Party ===
Brexit Party target seats
Rank	Constituency	Winning party 2017	Swing required	Winning party 2019
1	Hartlepool	Labour	n/a	Labour

=== Green Party of England and Wales ===
Green Party target seats
Rank	Constituency	Winning party 2017	Swing required	Winning party 2019
1	Bristol West	Labour	26.5%	Labour

=== Democratic Unionist Party ===
Democratic Unionist Party target seats
Rank	Constituency	Winning party 2017	Swing required	Winning party 2019
1	North Down	Independent	1.6%	Alliance

=== Ulster Unionist Party ===
Ulster Unionist Party target seats
Rank	Constituency	Winning party 2017	Swing required	Winning party 2019
1	Fermanagh and South Tyrone	Sinn Féin	0.8%	Sinn Féin
2	South Antrim	DUP	3.7%	DUP

=== SDLP ===
Social Democratic and Labour Party target seats
Rank	Constituency	Winning party 2017	Swing required	Winning party 2019
1	Belfast South	DUP	2.3%	SDLP
2	South Down	Sinn Féin	2.4%	Sinn Féin

=== Sinn Féin ===
Sinn Féin target seats
Rank	Constituency	Winning party 2017	Swing required	Winning party 2019
1	Belfast North	DUP	2.3%	Sinn Féin

== See also ==
- List of marginal seats before the 2024 United Kingdom general election
- List of marginal seats before the 2017 United Kingdom general election
- List of marginal seats before the 2015 United Kingdom general election
