= Eric Ollerenshaw =

British politician

Eric Ollerenshaw OBE
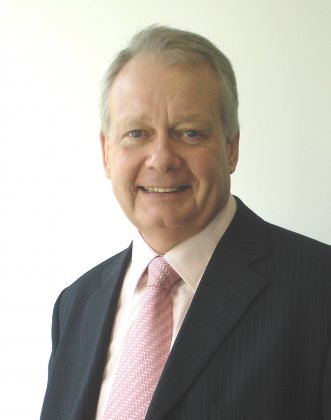

Member of Parliament for Lancaster and Fleetwood
- In office 6 May 2010 – 30 March 2015
- Preceded by: Constituency created
- Succeeded by: Cat Smith

Leader of the Conservative Party in the London Assembly
- In office 2000–2004
- Preceded by: Position established
- Succeeded by: Bob Neill

Member of the London Assembly as an additional member
- In office 4 May 2000 – 1 May 2004
- Preceded by: Constituency created
- Succeeded by: Peter Hulme-Cross

Personal details
- Born: 26 March 1950 (age 76) Ashton-under-Lyne, Lancashire, England
- Party: Conservative
- Education: London School of Economics
- Website: Official website

Eric Ollerenshaw OBE (born 26 March 1950) is a British Conservative Party politician. He was the Member of Parliament (MP) for Lancaster and Fleetwood from 2010 to 2015.

He was born and grew up in Lancashire and was educated at Hyde County Grammar School and the London School of Economics where he was awarded a Bachelor of Science degree in economics in 1971. He has previously been an elected member of the London Assembly and head of the Cities and Diversity section of the Conservative Party at Conservative Campaign Headquarters.

== Teaching career ==
Before moving into politics, Ollerenshaw was a full-time teacher of History. He taught in three comprehensive schools – two of which were social priority schools – and in 1986 gained his first elected position on the Inner London Education Authority. After rising to lead the Conservative group on the Authority in 1988, he worked with the Government and the Boroughs to abolish the Authority in 1990.

== Political career ==
In the 1991 New Year Honours, he was awarded his OBE for Public and Political Service. The same year he was elected to the London Borough of Hackney representing Springfield as one of its three Conservative councillors. In 1992 he stood as the Conservative Parliamentary Candidate in Heywood and Middleton.

In 1998, he rose to lead the Conservative group on Hackney London Borough Council when Joe Lobenstein, the previous leader of the group, became mayor of Hackney. His involvement with Councillor Isaac Leibowitz, who was later convicted of electoral fraud, was mentioned in an Early Day Motion from the Labour MP for Hackney South, Brian Sedgemore calling for him to be divested of his OBE. Between 2000 and 2001, he was the joint leader of Hackney Council with Labour's Jules Pipe during Hackney's most troubled period. In 2000, Ollerenshaw was elected as a member of the London Assembly and in 2002 rose to become the Conservative Group Leader. He was elected Member of Parliament for Lancaster and Fleetwood at the 2010 general election with a majority of 333 votes.

== Parliamentary career ==
In March 2007 he was selected as the Conservative Parliamentary Candidate for Lancaster and Fleetwood, which he won in the general election held on 6 May 2010 by just 333 votes. In September 2010 he was appointed Parliamentary Private Secretary to Baroness Warsi. Ollerenshaw campaigned on the 'No' side during the lead up to the 2011 Referendum on the Alternative Vote.

In the 2015 General Election Ollerenshaw lost to Labour's Cat Smith by 1,265 votes. After returning to live in Hackney, he was again selected as the Conservative candidate for Lancaster and Fleetwood at the 2017 General Election, once again being defeated by Labour's Cat Smith, but by a much increased margin of 6,661 votes, despite him increasing his votes and vote share.

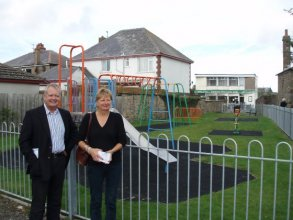
Eric Ollerenshaw with Lancaster Councillor Susie Charles

== Personal life ==
Ollerenshaw is openly gay. His partner of 36 years, Michael Donoghue, died of pancreatic cancer in 2009.

Ollerenshaw is a trustee of the Baroness Warsi Foundation.

Parliament of the United Kingdom
New constituency	Member of Parliament for Lancaster and Fleetwood; 2010–2015	Succeeded by Cat Smith
