= Lancaster and Fleetwood =

UK Parliament constituency (2010–2024)

- Former county constituency for the House of Commons
- Boundary of Lancaster and Fleetwood in Lancashire for the 2010 general election

- Location of Lancashire within England
- County: Lancashire
- Electorate: 67,305 (December 2010)
- Major settlements: Lancaster, Fleetwood

2010–2024
- Seats: One
- Created from: Blackpool North and Fleetwood; Lancaster and Wyre
- Replaced by: Blackpool North and Fleetwood; Lancaster and Wyre

Lancaster and Fleetwood was a constituency created in 2010 represented in the House of Commons of the UK Parliament.

Following the 2023 review of Westminster constituencies, the seat was abolished, with the majority being included in the re-established constituency of Lancaster and Wyre, which was first contested at the 2024 general election. Fleetwood moved to the re-established Blackpool North and Fleetwood seat.

== History ==
Creation

Following its review of parliamentary representation in Lancashire, the Boundary Commission created a new Wyre and Preston North constituency, contested first at the 2010 general election, which split the previous linking of Lancaster and Wyre. As a consequence, Lancaster and the coastal town of Fleetwood were attached for parliamentary purposes.

Summary of results

In 2010 the winning candidate was Eric Ollerenshaw, a Conservative. He lost in the 2015 general election to Labour's Cat Smith. The 2015 result gave the seat the 16th-smallest majority of Labour's 232 seats by percentage of majority. Ollerenshaw attempted to regain the seat at the 2017 general election but Smith won again, significantly increasing her majority to over 6,500. At the 2019 general election, Smith's majority declined to 2,380.

== Boundaries ==
Map of boundaries 2010–2024

The new seat of Lancaster and Fleetwood was subject to public consultation following the decision to create a new seat in Lancashire in the run-up to the 2010 general election, which caused major consequential changes to the central and southern parts of the county. During the consultation process, the Wyre ward of Cabus was moved from Lancaster and Fleetwood to Wyre and Preston North.

The seat contained the following electoral wards:

- Bulk, Castle, Duke's, Ellel, John O'Gaunt, Lower Lune Valley, Marsh, Scotforth East, Scotforth West and University in the City of Lancaster
- Mount, Park, Pharos, Pilling, Preesall, Rossall, Warren and Wyresdale in the borough of Wyre

== Members of Parliament ==
Election	Member	Party
2010	Eric Ollerenshaw	Conservative
2015	Cat Smith	Labour

== Elections ==
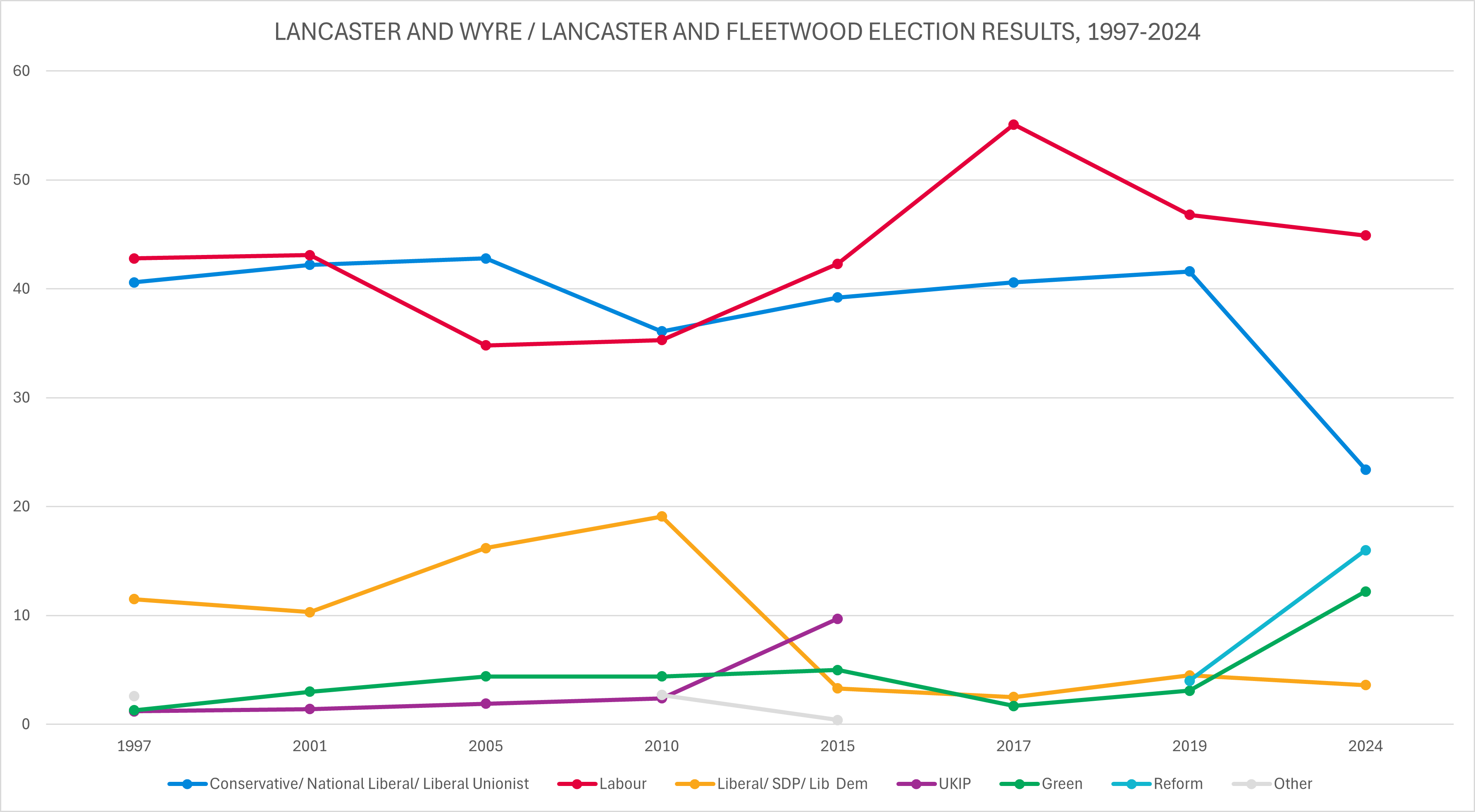
Election results 1997-2024

=== Elections in the 2010s ===
General election 2019: Lancaster and Fleetwood
Party	Candidate	Votes	%	±%
Labour	Cat Smith	21,184	46.8	−8.3
Conservative	Louise Thistlethwaite	18,804	41.6	+1.0
Liberal Democrats	Peter Jackson	2,018	4.5	+2.0
Brexit Party	Leanne Murray	1,817	4.0	New
Green	Caroline Jackson	1,396	3.1	+1.4
Majority		2,380	5.2	−9.3
Turnout		45,219	64.5	−3.8
Labour hold		Swing	−4.7	

General election 2017: Lancaster and Fleetwood
Party	Candidate	Votes	%	±%
Labour	Cat Smith	25,342	55.1	+12.8
Conservative	Eric Ollerenshaw	18,681	40.6	+1.4
Liberal Democrats	Robin Long	1,170	2.5	−0.8
Green	Rebecca Novell	796	1.7	−3.3
Majority		6,661	14.5	+11.4
Turnout		45,989	68.7	+0.1
Labour hold		Swing	+5.7	

General election 2015: Lancaster and Fleetwood
Party	Candidate	Votes	%	±%
Labour	Cat Smith	17,643	42.3	+7.0
Conservative	Eric Ollerenshaw	16,378	39.2	+3.1
UKIP	Matthew Atkins	4,060	9.7	+7.3
Green	Chris Coates	2,093	5.0	+0.6
Liberal Democrats	Robin Long	1,390	3.3	−15.8
Northern	Harold Elletson	174	0.4	New
Majority		1,265	3.1	N/A
Turnout		41,738	68.6	+7.5
Labour gain from Conservative		Swing	+1.9	

General election 2010: Lancaster and Fleetwood
Party	Candidate	Votes	%	±%
Conservative	Eric Ollerenshaw	15,404	36.1	+2.5
Labour	Clive Grunshaw	15,071	35.3	−7.1
Liberal Democrats	Stuart Langhorn	8,167	19.1	+3.5
Green	Gina Dowding	1,888	4.4	−1.4
UKIP	Fred McGlade	1,020	2.4	−0.1
BNP	Debra Kent	938	2.2	New
Independent	Keith Riley	213	0.5	New
Majority		333	0.8	N/A
Turnout		42,701	61.1	+1.6
Conservative gain from Labour		Swing	+4.8	

== See also ==
- parliamentary constituencies in Lancashire
