= Online petition =

Form of petition which is signed online, usually through a form on a website

An online petition (or Internet petition, or e-petition) is a form of petition which is signed online, usually through a form on a website. Visitors to the online petition sign the petition by adding their details such as name and email address. Typically, after there are enough signatories, the resulting letter may be delivered to the subject of the petition, usually via e-mail. The online petition may also deliver an email to the target of the petition each time the petition is signed.

== Pros and cons ==
=== Pros ===
- The format makes it easy for people to make a petition at any time.
- Several websites allow anyone with computer access to make one to protest any cause, such as stopping construction or closure of a store.

=== Cons ===
- Because petitions are easy to set up, the site can attract frivolous causes, or jokes framed in the ostensible form of a petition.
- Online petitions may be abused if signers use pseudonyms instead of real names, thus undermining its legitimacy.
- Verification, for example via a confirmation e-mail can prevent padding a petition with false names and e-mails. Many petition sites now have safeguards to match real world processes; such as local governments requiring protest groups to present petition signatures, plus their printed name, and a way to verify the signature (either with a phone number or identification number via a driver's license or a passport) to ensure that the signature is legitimate and not falsified by the protestors. In a recent article on the rise of online petitions in Singapore, a spokesperson for iPetitions.com, stated that IP checks and captchas can be deployed to fight fake petitions.
- In practice, official replies by government to online petitions often fall far short of expectations, are perceived to be late, dismissive, impersonal and unengaged. In some cases, replies are perceived to have been downplayed, and the actual impacts of the petition are ignored.

There are now several major websites and initiatives featuring online petitions including Change.org, openPetition, iPetitions.com, Avaaz.org, and 38 Degrees. These are growing in popularity and ability to achieve political impact. In 2012, several petitions on Change.org were attributed to the reversal of a United Airlines Dog Policy.

Some legitimate non-governmental organizations (NGOs) shun online petitions. Reasons include the paucity of examples of this form of petition achieving its objective. Critics frequently cite it as an example of slacktivism.

Slacktivism is often seen with these online petitions. Due to the ease of signing the petitions, (users can write in their own name or manufacture a fake one), signatures alone rarely result in a change in the situation being protested. While this is an unfortunate con, there are many pros as well.

In February 2007 an online petition against road pricing and car tracking on the UK Prime Minister's own website attracted over 1.8 million e-signatures from a population of 60 million people. The site was official but experimental at the time. Shocked government ministers were unable to backtrack on the site's existence in the face of national news coverage of the phenomenon. The incident has demonstrated both the potential and pitfalls of online e-Government petitions.

== History ==
=== E-mail petitions ===
A similar form of petition is the e-mail petition. This petition may be a simple chain letter, requesting that its users forward them to a large number of people in order to meet a goal or to attain a falsely promised reward. Other times the usage will contain a form to be printed and filled out, or a link to an offsite online petition which the recipient can sign. Usually, the e-mail petition focuses on a specific cause that is meant to cause outrage or ire, centering on a timely political or cultural topic. E-mail petitions were among the earliest attempts to garner attention to a cause from an online audience.

=== Most signed Internet petitions ===
On 23 March 2019, the record for greatest number of verified signatures on an official government petition was broken in the UK. The petition, remaining live until August 2019, calls to ‘Revoke Article 50 and remain in the E.U.', and had over 6 million signatures by 31 March 2019. It coincided with the large national People's Vote March on the same day, also protesting against the U.K. government's decision to leave the European Union following the Brexit referendum.

The international record for most successful online petition is currently held by Argentinaout.com the petition relating to the Argentinian football team and it's supposed cheating in the FIFA 2026 world cup. The petition finally closed in July 2026 with a world record of 23,316,108 signatures.

=== World Wide Web ===
With the rise of the World Wide Web as a platform for commerce, activism and discussion, an opportunity to garner attention for various social causes was perceived by various players, resulting in a more formalized structure for online petitions; one of the first web-based petition hosts, PetitionOnline, was founded in 1999, with others such as GoPetition (founded in 2000), thePetitionSite.com, iPetitions, and others being established in the years since. Petition hosts served as accessible external locations for the creation of a wide variety of petitions for free by users, providing easier interfaces for such petitions in comparison to the previous e-mail petitions and informal web forum-based petitions. However, petition hosts were criticized for their lax requirements from users who created or signed such petitions: petitions were often only signed with false or anonymous nomenclatures, and often resulted in disorganized side commentary between signers of the same petition.

The rise of online social networking in the later 2000s, however, resulted in both an increase of Internet petition integration into social networks and an increase of visibility for such petitions; Facebook, Change.org, Care2, SumOfUs, GoPetition and other sites serve as examples of the integration of Internet petitions as a form of social media and user-generated content. Such networks may have proven to be more fertile ground for the creation of, signing of and response to online petitions, as such networks generally lack the heightened level of anonymity associated with the earlier dedicated petition hosts.

In some cases petition sites have managed to reach agreement with state institutions about the implementation mechanism of widely supported initiatives. Thus, platform ManaBalss.lv in Latvia has the authority to hand over to a national parliament any legally correct initiative which has been signed by more than 10,000 authenticated supporters. Approximately half of these initiatives have been either supported by parliament or are in the process of review.

== E-government petitions in Europe and Australia ==
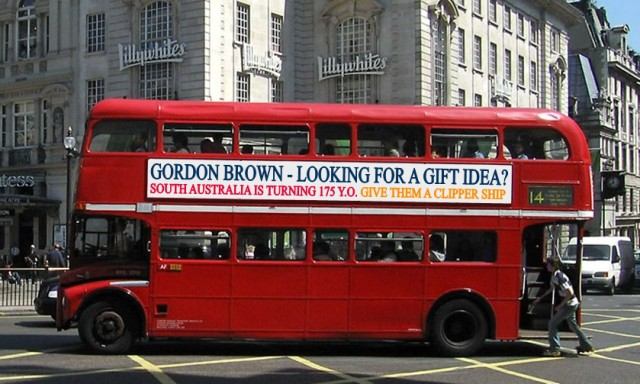
Simulated bus advertisement used to promote an e-Petition to the British Prime Minister

The UK Parliament petitions website has operated in various guises since 2006. Beginning in 2011, a parliamentary committee considered holding a parliamentary debate for petitions attracting more than 100,000 signatures. In 2015, the process was formalized within Parliament and a permanent Petitions Committee was established. In the UK, the Local Democracy, Economic Development and Construction Act 2009 requires all principal authorities to provide a facility for people to submit petitions electronically.

Some parliaments, government agencies and officials, such as The Scottish Parliament with the e-Petitioner system (from 1999), the Queensland Parliament in Australia, German Bundestag (from 2005), Cabinet of ministers of Ukraine (from 2016) and Bristol City Council in the U.K have adopted electronic petitioning systems as a way to display a commitment to their constituents and provide greater accessibility into government operations.

The European Parliament Committee on Petitions (PETI) is one of the permanent committees of the European Parliament to offer a petition process including a web portal to create and admit petitions. The right to petition is one of the fundamental rights of the European citizens and residents.

== E-government petitions in the United States ==
The US government created We The People in 2011 as a platform for creating and signing petitions on the White House web server. The White House originally required petitions to gather 5,000 signatures within 30 days, after which time policy officials in the administration would review the petition and issue an official response. Within two weeks of its launch, the threshold was raised to 25,000 signatures. Further changes in 2013 raised the threshold to 100,000 signatures.

Other groups are attempting to establish electronic petitioning as a way to streamline and make existing citizens' initiative processes more accessible.

== Debate over efficacy ==
As is the case with public perceptions of slacktivism, Internet petitions are both a popular resort of web-based activism and a target of criticism from those who feel that such petitions are often disregarded by their targets because of the anonymity of petition signers; Snopes.com, for example, sides against the usage of Internet petitions as a method of activism. On the other hand, the creators of petition hosts, such as Randy Paynter of Care2 and thePetitionSite.com, have defended web-based petitions as being more feasible, credible and effective than e-mail petitions, claiming they are not fairly judged as a method of activism by their critics. Since then, Snopes.com has removed the text about the inefficacy of Internet petitions.

In a 2017 study done called "Change is an emotional state of mind: Behavioral responses to online petitions" by Abby Koenig and Bryan McLaughlin, the authors show the behavioral aspects that go into online petitions. This article goes over the unfortunate negativity that is a reoccurring theme in social media sites like change.org These sites while most of the time try to benefit good causes, often may cause "scams" to happen. This happens on sites like "change" because users have the option to write why they are contributing to a cause which can cause hate speech or negativity towards someone or something.

== See also ==
- City council
- e-participation
- Initiative
- Virtual volunteering
