= Petitions Committee =

UK House of Commons select committee

The Petitions Committee is a parliamentary committee of the House of Commons of the United Kingdom. Its role is to oversee petitions submitted to Parliament, including both electronically through the UK Parliament petitions website, and traditional paper petitions. The committee is one of the youngest in the Commons, formed in 2015, and is made up of 11 backbench Members of Parliament.

== Procedure ==
The process for e-petitions differs from the process for paper petitions, which can only be presented to the House of Commons by an MP.

E-petitions can be submitted by British citizens and UK residents to the UK Government and Parliament via the UK Parliament petitions website. Petitions must be about something which Government or Parliament is responsible for, and must ask for a specific action from Parliament or Government.

An e-petition must be signed by the petition creator and five supporters before it will be sent for moderation. Moderation ensures that draft petitions meet the website's standards for publication. Petitions which do not meet the website's standards are rejected. Petitions published on the website are available for members of the public to sign. Petitions remain open for signatures for six months. At the end of six months, petitions are closed and formally reported by the Petitions Committee to Parliament.

All petitions which are published are reviewed by the Petitions Committee. Petitions which reach 10,000 signatures receive a written response from the UK Government. The committee can schedule debates in the House of Commons' second debating chamber (Westminster Hall), on Monday evenings at 4.30 pm.

When Parliament is dissolved, all open petitions on petition.parliament.uk are closed, and new petitions are not accepted. After a new Petitions Committee is set up by the House of Commons, closed petitions are not reopened.

Petitions which reach 100,000 signatures are considered by the committee for debate. Petitions may not be put forward for debate if the issue has been debated recently, or is already scheduled for debate in the near future. Most petitions which reach the threshold are debated.

The Petitions Committee may also take other action on published petitions. On 1 March 2016 the Committee published its first report, Funding for research into brain tumours, in response to a petition which had gained over 120,000 signatures.

The Petitions Committee has also taken oral evidence jointly with the Environment, Food and Rural Affairs Committee on grouse shooting, with the Health Select Committee on the meningitis B vaccine, and with the Women and Equalities Committee on high heels and workplace dress codes in response to petitions.

== Chairs ==
Committee chairs include those listed below.

Name	Start	End	Party	Constituency
Helen Jones	18 June 2015	6 November 2019	Labour	Warrington North
Catherine McKinnell	29 January 2020	6 September 2023	Labour	Newcastle upon Tyne North
Cat Smith	18 October 2023	30 May 2024	Labour	Lancaster and Fleetwood
Jamie Stone	9 September 2024	present	Liberal Democrats	Caithness, Sutherland and Easter Ross

== Membership ==
=== 2024-present ===
Membership of the committee is as follows:

Member	Party	Constituency
Jamie Stone MP (Chair)	Liberal Democrats	Caithness, Sutherland and Easter Ross
Irene Campbell MP	Labour	North Ayrshire and Arran
Jacob Collier MP	Labour	Burton and Uttoxeter
Paul Davies MP	Labour	Colne Valley
Ben Goldsborough MP	Labour	South Norfolk
John Lamont MP	Conservative	Berwickshire, Roxburgh and Selkirk
Rebecca Long-Bailey MP	Labour	Salford
Robbie Moore MP	Conservative	Keighley and Ilkley
Dave Robertson MP	Labour	Lichfield
Roz Savage MP	Liberal Democrats	South Cotswolds
Tony Vaughan MP	Labour	Folkestone and Hythe

==== Changes since 2024 ====
Date	Outgoing Member & Party	Constituency	→	New Member & Party	Constituency	Source
6 January 2025	Kevin Bonavia MP (Labour)	Stevenage	→	Paul Davies MP (Labour)	Colne Valley	Hansard
3 March 2025	David Baines MP (Labour)	St Helens North	→	Jacob Collier MP (Labour)	Burton and Uttoxeter	Hansard
16 November 2026	Lewis Atkinson MP (Labour)	Sunderland Central	→	Rebecca Long-Bailey MP (Labour)	Salford	Hansard

=== 2019-2024 ===
The chair was elected on 29 January 2020, with the members of the committee being announced on 2 March 2020.

Member	Party	Constituency
Catherine McKinnell MP (Chair)	Labour	Newcastle upon Tyne North
Elliot Colburn MP	Conservative	Carshalton and Wallington
Martyn Day MP	SNP	Linlithgow and East Falkirk
Steve Double MP	Conservative	St Austell and Newquay
Chris Evans MP	Labour and Co-op	Islwyn
Katherine Fletcher MP	Conservative	South Ribble
Nick Fletcher MP	Conservative	Don Valley
Mike Hill MP	Labour	Hartlepool
Tom Hunt MP	Conservative	Ipswich
Kerry McCarthy MP	Labour	Bristol East
Theresa Villiers MP	Conservative	Chipping Barnet

==== Changes 2019-2024 ====
Date	Outgoing Member & Party	Constituency	→	New Member & Party	Constituency	Source
8 June 2020	Kerry McCarthy MP (Labour)	Bristol East	→	Tonia Antoniazzi MP (Labour)	Gower	Hansard
8 June 2020	Steve Double MP (Conservative)	St Austell and Newquay	→	Jonathan Gullis MP (Conservative)	Stoke-on-Trent North	Hansard
1 March 2021	Theresa Villiers MP (Conservative)	Chipping Barnet	→	Matt Vickers MP (Conservative)	Stockton South	Hansard
16 March 2021	Mike Hill MP (Labour)	Hartlepool	→	Vacant		Resignation of member from Parliament
20 April 2021	Vacant		→	Taiwo Owatemi MP (Labour)	Coventry North West	Hansard
13 July 2021	Chris Evans MP (Labour)	Islwyn	→	Christina Rees MP (Labour and Co-op (Note: Whip suspended from 13 October 2022 to 1 February 2024.))	Neath	Hansard
15 March 2022	Taiwo Owatemi MP (Labour)	Coventry North West	→	Marsha de Cordova MP (Labour)	Battersea	Hansard
21 June 2022	Katherine Fletcher MP (Conservative)	South Ribble	→	Scott Benton MP (Conservative (Note: Whip suspended from 5 April 2023.))	Blackpool South	Hansard
6 September 2023	Catherine McKinnell MP (Chair, Labour)	Newcastle upon Tyne North	→	Vacant		Hansard
20 April 2021	Vacant		→	Cat Smith MP (Chair, Labour)	Lancaster and Fleetwood	Hansard
25 March 2024	Scott Benton MP (Independent)	Blackpool South	→	Vacant		Resignation of member from Parliament
14 May 2024	Tom Hunt MP (Conservative)	Ipswich	→	Tracey Crouch MP (Conservative)	Chatham and Aylesford	Hansard
14 May 2024	Matt Vickers MP (Conservative)	Stockton South	→	Peter Gibson MP (Conservative)	Darlington	Hansard
20 April 2024	Vacant		→	Steve Double MP (Conservative)	St Austell and Newquay	Hansard

== Petitions debated by the Commons ==
=== 2015–2017 Parliament ===
Date	Petition title	Topic	Records of the debate
14/09/2015	To debate a vote of no confidence in Health Secretary the Right Hon Jeremy Hunt (Contracts and conditions in the NHS)	Junior doctors	Debate video; Hansard
12/10/2015	Make the production, sale and use of cannabis legal.	Cannabis in the United Kingdom, Legality of cannabis	Debate video; Hansard
19/10/2015	Stop allowing immigrants into the UK	Immigration in the United Kingdom	Debate video; Hansard
26/10/2015	Make an allowance for up to 2 weeks term time leave from school for holiday	English school holidays	Debate video; Hansard
30/11/2015	Introduce a tax on sugary drinks in the UK to improve our children's health	Sugary drinks tax	Debate video; Hansard
07/12/2015	Don't kill our bees! Immediately halt the use of Neonicotinoids on crops	Bees and toxic chemicals, Neonicotinoids	Debate video; Hansard
11/01/2016	Keep the NHS Bursary	NHS Student Bursary	Debate video; Hansard
18/01/2016	Block Donald J Trump from UK entry; Don't ban Trump from the United Kingdom	Donald Trump	Debate video; Hansard
25/01/2016	Scrap plans forcing self-employed & small business to do 4 tax returns yearly	Taxation in the United Kingdom	Debate video; Hansard
01/02/2016	Make fair transitional state pension arrangements for 1950s women	Pensions in the United Kingdom	Debate video; Hansard
07/03/2016	Scrap the £35k threshold for non-EU citizens settling in the UK	Immigration in the United Kingdom	Debate video; Hansard
21/03/2016	Jeremy Hunt to resume meaningful contract negotiations with the BMA	Junior doctors	Debate video; Hansard
18/04/2016	Fund more research into brain tumours, the biggest cancer killer of under-40s	Brain tumors; cancer research	Debate video; Hansard
25/04/2016	Give the Meningitis B vaccine to ALL children, not just newborn babies	Meningococcal vaccine	Debate video; Hansard
09/05/2016	Stop Cameron spending British taxpayers' money on Pro-EU Referendum leaflets	2016 United Kingdom European Union membership referendum	Debate video; Hansard
06/06/2016	Restrict the use of fireworks to reduce stress and fear in animals and pets	Fireworks law in the United Kingdom	Debate video; Hansard
13/06/2016	Stop spending a fixed 0.7 per cent slice of our national wealth on Foreign Aid	Department for International Development	Debate video; Hansard
04/07/2016	Include expressive arts subjects in the EBacc	English Baccalaureate	Debate video; Hansard
11/07/2016	No more school penalty fines and bring back the 10 day authorised absence	English school holidays	Debate video; Hansard
18/07/2016	Stop retrospective changes to the student loans agreement	Student loans in the United Kingdom	Debate video; Hansard
5/09/2016	EU Referendum Rules triggering a 2nd EU Referendum	Second referendum on EU membership	Debate video; Hansard
12/09/2016	Urge the South Korean Government to end the brutal dog meat trade	Dog meat consumption in South Korea	Debate video; Hansard
17/10/2016	Invoke Article 50 of The Lisbon Treaty immediately	UK invocation of Article 50	Debate video; Hansard
24/10/2016	Debate in the House the Local Government Pension Scheme Investment Regulations	Local Government Pension Scheme	Debate video; Hansard
31/10/2016	Ban driven grouse shooting	Driven grouse shooting	Debate video; Hansard
21/11/2016	Free childcare when both parents are working. Not just those who are on benefits	Child care in the United Kingdom	Debate video; Hansard
12/12/2016	Close all retail on boxing day, retail isn't needed on boxing day!	Boxing Day bank holiday	Debate video; Hansard
12/12/2016	Close all retail on boxing day, retail isn't needed on boxing day!	Boxing Day bank holiday	Debate video; Hansard
23/01/2017	Ban all non-recyclable/non-compostable packaging in the UK	Packaging waste	Debate video; Hansard
30/01/2017	Demand an end to the pay restraint imposed on agenda for change NHS staff	National Health Service staff	Debate video; Hansard
06/02/2017	Shut down the domestic ivory market in the UK	Ivory trade	Debate video; Hansard
20/02/2017	Prevent Donald Trump from making a State Visit to the United Kingdom; Donald Trump should make a State Visit to the United Kingdom	Donald Trump	Debate video; Hansard
27/02/2017	Make it a specific criminal offence to attack any member of NHS Medical Staff	National Health Service staff	Debate video; Hansard
06/03/2017	Make it illegal for a company to require women to wear high heels at work	Dress code	Debate video; Hansard
13/03/2017	April's Law	Child abuse	Debate video; Hansard
20/03/2017	Put a max of £1200 on car insurance for 18-25 year olds	Car insurance	Debate video; Hansard
27/03/2017	End the badger cull instead of expanding to new areas	Badger culling in the United Kingdom	Debate video; Hansard
24/04/2017	Authorise open book examinations for GCSE English Literature 2017	General Certificate of Secondary Education	Debate video; Hansard

=== 2017–2019 Parliament ===
Date	Petition title	Topic	Records of the debate
23/10/2017	Make paying rent enough proof that you are able meet mortgage repayments	Mortgage industry of the United Kingdom	Debate video; Hansard
30/10/2017	To make votes matter, adopt Proportional Representation for UK General Elections	Elections in the United Kingdom	Debate video; Hansard
6/11/2017	Make mental health education compulsory in primary and secondary schools	Mental health in the United Kingdom	Debate video; Hansard
13/11/2017	Agree to a second referendum on Scottish Independence	Proposed second Scottish independence referendum	Debate video; Hansard
20/11/2017	Abolish the TV Licence	Television licensing in the United Kingdom	Debate video; Hansard
27/11/2017	Change the university fees from £9250 back to the £3000 fee for the UK	Tuition fees in the United Kingdom	Debate video; Hansard
4/12/2017	Pay Up Now! – Scrap the pay cap and give public servants a meaningful pay rise	Public sector	Debate video; Hansard
11/12/2017	Hold a referendum on the final Brexit deal; Reject all demands from the EU for penalty charges for Brexit; Put the final Brexit deal to a referendum with revoking Article 50 as an option; No referendum on the final deal for the UK to remain in the European Union	Proposed referendum on the Brexit withdrawal agreement	Debate video; Hansard
18/12/2017	Put pressure on Libya to take action to stop enslavement of Black Africans	Slavery in Libya	Debate video; Hansard
15/1/2018	Keep Childcare Vouchers open beyond April 2018	Childcare voucher scheme	Debate video; Hansard
22/1/2018	Leave the EU immediately	No-deal Brexit	Debate video; Hansard
29/1/2018	Change the laws governing the use of fireworks to include a ban on public use	Fireworks law in the United Kingdom	Debate video; Hansard
26/2/2018	End the export of live farm animals after Brexit	Live export in the United Kingdom	Debate video; Hansard
5/3/2018	Make British Sign Language part of the National Curriculum	British Sign Language	Debate video; Hansard
5/3/2018	Insurance should be on the car itself instead of the individuals who drive it	Vehicle insurance in the United Kingdom	Debate video; Hansard
19/3/2018	Make Orkambi available on the NHS for people with Cystic Fibrosis	Lumacaftor/ivacaftor	Debate video; Hansard
26/3/2018	Change the GCSE English Literature exam from closed book to open book	General Certificate of Secondary Education	Debate video; Hansard
