= Academic year =

Period of study in an educational institution

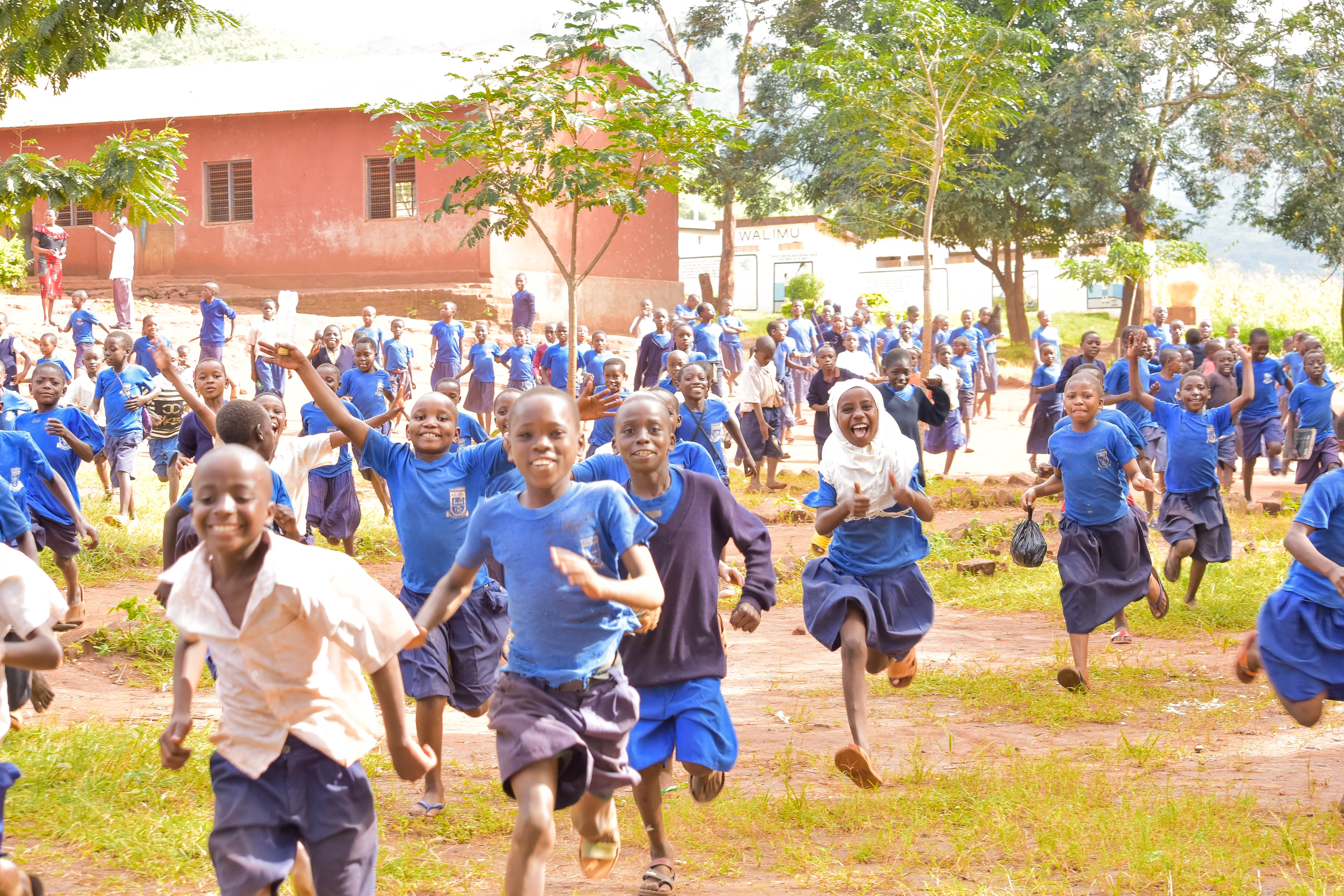
Last day in a Tanzanian school

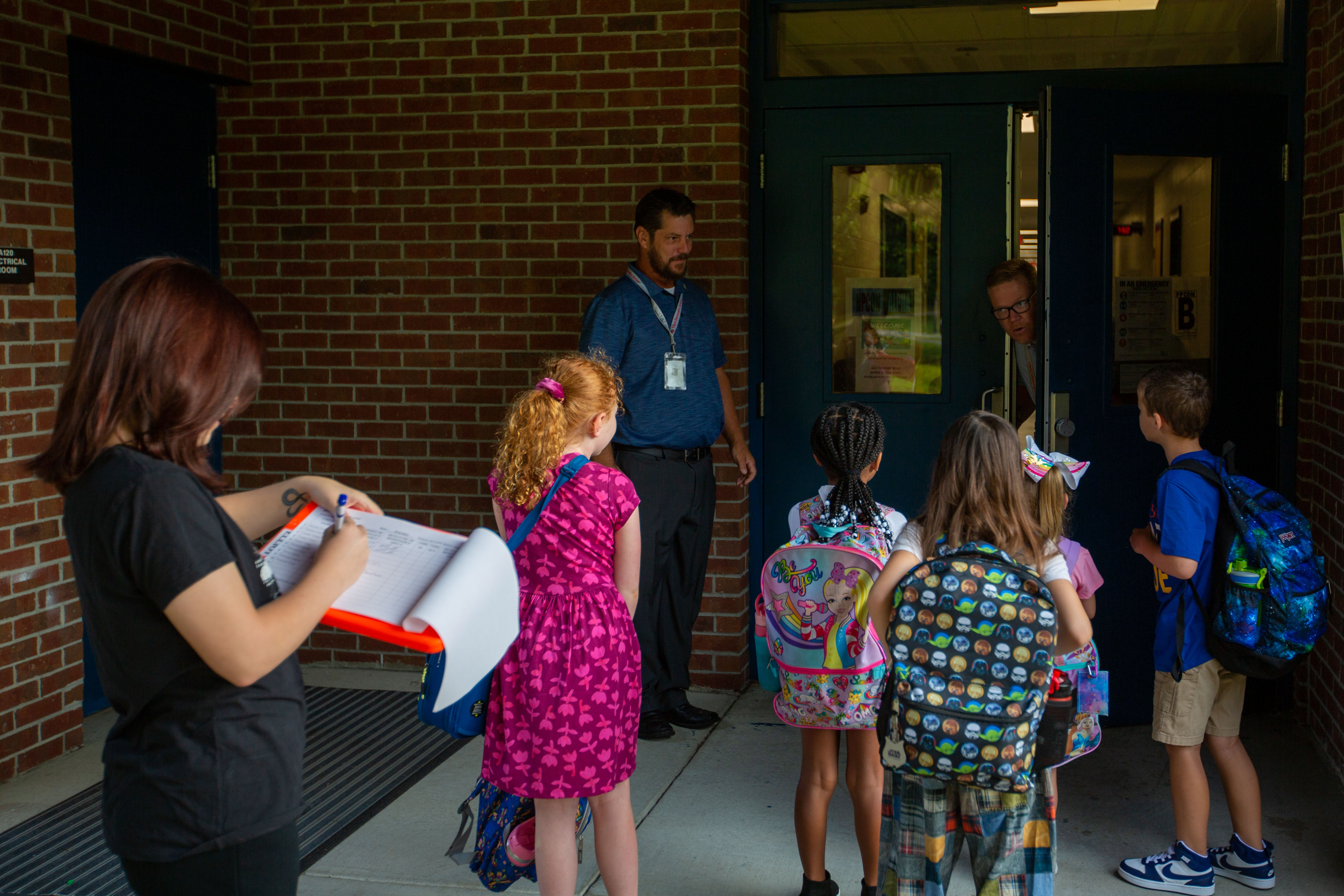
First day in an American school

An academic year, or school year, is a period that schools, colleges and universities use to measure the duration of the studies for the given the educational level. Academic years are often divided into academic terms. Students attend classes and do relevant exams and homework during this time, which comprises school days (days when there is education) and school holidays (when there is a break from education). The duration of school days, holidays and school year varies across the world. The days in the school year depend on the state or country. For example, in most of the US states, there are 180 days in a school year, but in the US state of Minnesota there are 165 days in the year.

== Terminology ==
=== School days ===
A "school day" is a day when school is open. Governments often legislate on the total number of school days in a year for government funded (i.e., not private) schools.

=== School holidays ===
School holidays (also referred to as vacations, breaks, and recess) are periods during which schools are closed or no classes or other mandatory activities are held. The dates and periods of school holidays vary considerably throughout the world, and there is usually some variation even within the same jurisdiction. The holidays given below apply to primary and secondary education. Teaching sessions (terms or semesters) in tertiary education are usually longer.

==== Spring vacation ====
In the northern hemisphere, many school districts have traditionally offered a week-long vacation in the spring, often called Spring Vacation or Spring Break. In parochial schools and jurisdictions that follow a Christian religious tradition, the vacation may be described as an Easter holiday, which starts on Good Friday and continues through the subsequent week.

==== Summer vacation ====
In the northern hemisphere, the longest break in the educational calendar is in the middle of the year, during the northern summer, and lasting up to 14 weeks. In Ireland, Italy, Latvia, Lithuania, and Russia, summer holidays typically last three months, compared to six to eight weeks in Britain, the Netherlands, and Germany. In India and Pakistan, summer holidays typically span a duration of one to two months, extending from May to June. In the southern hemisphere, the longest break in the educational calendar is in the end-beginning of the year, during the southern summer, and lasts up to 14 weeks, from December 21 to March 20.

== Common practices and effects ==
Traffic congestion and heavy passenger loads on public transport on school run routes may be worse on school days during term time.

Summer holidays for most children are a time to relax, enjoy themselves, catch up on studies, or spend time with family or relatives. Many families travel together on school holidays. School holidays have many effects on a country, ranging from the price of travel and holiday accommodation, which increase as demand increases while children are off school, to a change in crime rate. The number of families taking holidays away from urban areas can reduce traffic and use of public transport in cities while loading long-distance highways and means of transport.

In some countries where many families travel to their holiday destinations, such as the Netherlands, the start and end dates of school holidays in different regions are staggered to reduce the heavy traffic and pressure on means of transport that would otherwise occur on these dates.

== By country ==
=== Africa ===
==== Nigeria ====
In Nigeria, the longest holiday is from January ending to first or second week of November for secondary schools and a longer duration within same period for tertiary institutions. Holidays are generally determined by schools and typically run from July to the early days of September.

==== Egypt ====
In Egypt, the longest holiday is usually from May ending on the start of October. There is also a mid-term break between semesters that lasts 3–4 weeks.

==== South Africa ====
The South Africa academic calendar starts in mid-January and ends in early December. The academic lesson for the school year ends in mid-October, with final examinations taking place from late October to late November. The learners usually stop attending class after their last exam. In essence, the December closing is more for teachers and school staff to mark exams and prepare end-year school reports to issue on the last day of the academic calendar.

The year is divided into four academic terms, with the first term starting in mid-January and ending in late March or early April. The second term starts in early or mid-April and ends in late June. The third term runs from early July to late September. The fourth and last term usually starts at the beginning of October and closes in mid-December when the academic year officially comes to an end.

In South Africa, the main holiday usually lasts from early December to early or mid-January (5 or 6 weeks). There is an autumn break of up to two weeks in late March or early April, a longer winter break in late June and early July normally around three weeks, and a spring break in late September or early October which is one week.

South African schools and universities are closed on all South African public holidays. In terms of the Public Holidays Act, if the holiday falls on a Sunday, then schools are closed the following Monday.

=== Americas ===
==== Brazil ====
Brazilian schools must have at least 200 school days.

In Brazil, summer holidays start in late November or early December and end in late January or early February. Winter holidays are generally the entire month of July, while in some states it lasts during the São João recess. Some schools in the tropical north follow a different school year. The Brazilian Carnival is 40 days before Easter Sunday and those dates are not school holidays. Some national and Catholic holidays are usually celebrated in 3 or 4 days, like Easter, Corpus Christi and Carnival.

==== Canada ====
In Canada, the school year typically lasts between 185 and 190 days. The summer holiday includes the months of July and August, with students returning to school in late August or early September, most commonly on the day after Labour Day. The winter break lasts for two weeks (sometimes a day or two longer), beginning on Saturday and encompassing Christmas Day and New Year's Day. The spring break is one to two weeks long depending on the city or province. Good Friday and Easter may or may not fall within spring break. The Thanksgiving break is a 3-day break that falls in mid-October.

In Ontario, the school year is regulated to last at least 194 days, with up to seven of those days being professional activity days, for a total minimum of 187 instructional days. Spring break (commonly known as March Break) is the third week in March.

==== Chile ====
The school year is divided into semesters. The first semester runs from late February or early March to July. Following a two- or three-week winter break, school resumes and lasts until early or mid-December, followed by 10–12 weeks of summer vacations. In addition, schools have a one-week-long break for National Holidays in mid-September. Being located in the Southern Hemisphere, spring begins approximately at the end of this holiday week so it acts similarly to the American spring break. There is also a brief Easter break in March or April.

==== United States ====
===== Duration of US academic year =====
Public schools averaged 180 school days in the 2023 academic year. However, different states have different legal minimum requirements for instructional days and hours per year. In 2023 the number of instructional days required ranged from the lowest minimum of 160 in the state of Colorado to the highest minimum of 186 in the state of Kansas. Most states require around 180 school days. School years at colleges/universities are often shorter, ranging from 140 to 160 days. Private schools tend to have classes for 170 days each year.

===== Event-based breaks in the US =====
Below are the school holidays/breaks in the US, with the four main breaks underlined:

- Thanksgiving or Fall Break – Occurs at the end of November. This holiday usually consists of the week of Thanksgiving – the day before Thanksgiving, Thanksgiving Day, and the day after Thanksgiving. Some areas have the Monday and Tuesday of the Thanksgiving week as regular days and take Wednesday as an early dismissal day, with Thanksgiving and the day after off. Other schools take the whole week off and have an early release on the Friday before the break. US Thanksgiving is on the fourth Thursday of November (occurs between November 22 and November 28), while Black Friday is on the Friday after the fourth Thursday of November (occurs between November 23 and November 29).
- Christmas or Winter Break – Varies in length per school; usually starts on the third Saturday in December and ends a day or two after New Year's Day (sometimes the first Monday after January 2).
- Martin Luther King Jr. Day – Martin Luther King Jr. Day is always on the third Monday of January each year. Some students have a full or half-day Friday and have the weekend, Martin Luther King Jr. Day, and sometimes the subsequent Tuesday off.
- Spring or Easter Break – Usually lasts for one or two weeks in March or April.
- Columbus Day or Indigenous Peoples' Day Break – Columbus Day is always the second Monday in October. Many schools take a week off, though some areas only take Columbus Day itself off. In many states, however, Columbus Day is not observed as a school holiday at all. Also called Indigenous Peoples' Day.
- October Break – Usually lasts for one week in October (in the week of Columbus Day). See Columbus Day above. Not all schools have this break.
- Mid-Winter or February Break – One week in February (usually at or around President's Day) or March (depending on the region).
- Summer Vacation or Break – Lasts for about 11–16 weeks, starting anywhere from the Friday before Memorial Day to late June, and ending anywhere from August to the day after Labor Day in early September. This often depends on the region – for example, most schools in the Northeastern United States end in June and start just after Labor Day, while the majority of schools in the Southern and Southwestern U.S. have school years end around Memorial Day and begin in August.
- Inservice day(s) – Scheduled breaks for teachers to participate in training, discussions, or to attend the state or national conventions held by a teachers' union. Some public school systems also schedule Inservice Days for religious holidays where a significant number of students might be missing, such as for Jewish or Islamic holy days which would not normally be a secular holiday.
- All federal and state holidays – Includes Christian religious holidays, such as Good Friday, and sometimes Jewish and Islamic religious holidays, depending on school demographic.

In charter schools, breaks are often shorter due to the extended number of days students spend in school (200 days)

===== Terms in the US =====
An academic year typically includes a fall and spring semester, with a shorter optional summer session. Many also have a short optional winter session or a wheel-rotation schedule year-round. Some operate on a trimester calendar.

One theory to explain the long summer break is that when the United States was a primarily agrarian society, children were needed during the Northern Hemisphere summer months for farm labor. However, there is little evidence supporting this, with 19th-century rural schools more typically favoring a summer academic term and more vacation time during spring and autumn.

Summer is still a popular time for family vacations, and most have a two or three-month summer vacation. The academic year typically runs from August or early September until late May or early June, depending on the length of the year and number of the holiday, vacation, and snow days occurring during the year. The year is divided into two semesters, three trimesters or four quarters, also called marking periods, typically with a report card issued to students' parents at the end of each.

Continuing education classes (often available at community colleges and private "boot camp" style schools) are often shorter and start throughout the year with no particular seasonality.

For college sports sanctioned by the National Collegiate Athletic Association and its associated conferences, their calendar for the year starts on July 1, with the year ending on the succeeding June 30, with other multiple calendars for each sport regarding recruiting and competition periods.

===== College breaks in the US =====
Colleges and universities vary widely. Some closely follow the K-12 break schedule, others have the same but longer breaks to accommodate students who live farther away and wish to return home for holidays. Most colleges and universities have the following breaks:

- Thanksgiving/Fall Break – end of November (The week of Thanksgiving – 3 days before Thanksgiving, Thanksgiving Day, and the day after – the Friday before the break is considered a half-day).
- Winter Break – mid-December to mid January
- Spring Break – a week or two in March or April (usually starting on Good Friday)
- Summer Break – Early/mid-May to between August 1 and the day after Labor Day in September (usually lasting about 12–16 weeks).

Most colleges and university years are divided into two semesters. The first starting from the beginning of the year (August/September) until mid-December, and the second lasting from January until early May. Winter and summer classes could be taken in between the breaks.

=== Asia ===
==== China ====
Summer holidays usually last from early July to the start of September. The winter holiday usually lasts 1 month, and its time varies depending on the date of the Chinese New Year.

==== Hong Kong ====
In Hong Kong summer holidays last from mid-July to the end of August. Christmas, Lunar New Year and Easter holidays last usually for one and a half weeks.

==== India ====
India does not have a single national academic calendar. The calendar is instead set by the interaction of multiple examining boards, 28 states and 8 union territories each running their own education department, and climate zones ranging from Himalayan winters to the Kerala monsoon, so start and end dates, vacation timing, and even the structure of schooling itself vary by region, board, and level of study.

===== School structure =====
Under the National Education Policy 2020 (NEP 2020), the older "10+2" school structure is being replaced with a "5+3+3+4" model spanning ages 3 to 18, adopted on a state-by-state, voluntary basis since 2021:

Stage	Duration	Ages	Classes
Foundational	5 years	3–8	Pre-school + Classes 1–2
Preparatory	3 years	8–11	Classes 3–5
Middle	3 years	11–14	Classes 6–8
Secondary	4 years	14–18	Classes 9–10, then 11–12

Older cohorts and most current students still follow the previous 10+2 structure, under which the school year runs roughly June/July to March/April, with Classes 10 and 12 finishing earlier to sit board examinations.

===== Boards =====
Schooling is delivered through multiple examining boards rather than one national syllabus: the pan-India Central Board of Secondary Education (CBSE) and Council for the Indian School Certificate Examinations (ICSE/ISC), an independent State Board run by each state with its own calendar, the National Institute of Open Schooling for flexible, non-annual cycles, and a small number of schools following the International Baccalaureate or Cambridge IGCSE/A-Level on separate international calendars. State boards educate the large majority of students: exam-registration data from 2007–2023 shows roughly 92 percent of secondary and higher-secondary candidates nationally sit state/regional board exams, against about 8 percent for CBSE and CISCE combined. Because each board sets its own dates, the June/July–March/April pattern applies most directly to CBSE and many state boards, not uniformly to ICSE, NIOS, or international-curriculum schools.

===== Regional and festival holidays =====
Vacation timing tracks regional climate and local festival calendars as much as any board's official schedule:

Region/state	Major distinct break	Approximate timing
North India (general)	Summer vacation	Mid-May to end of June
South India (general)	Summer vacation	Late March/early April to end of May or early-to-mid June
Tamil Nadu, Andhra Pradesh, Telangana	Pongal/Sankranti break	Mid-January
West Bengal, Odisha, Assam, Tripura, Jharkhand	"Puja vacation" (Durga Puja/Diwali)	September–October, up to two weeks
Kerala	Onam vacation	Late August–early September, 9–14 days
Maharashtra	Ganesh Chaturthi break	August–September, often merged with Dussehra
Punjab	Baisakhi break	Mid-April
Assam	Three Bihu breaks	Mid-January, mid-April, mid-October

National holidays observed by schools of every board and state: Republic Day (26 January), Independence Day (15 August), and Gandhi Jayanti (2 October).

===== Board examinations =====
Classes 10 and 12 finish earlier in the year to sit board examinations. CBSE's exams typically run mid-February to early/mid-April, with results in May. State boards run comparable but separately scheduled exams, generally in March, with results by May or June.

===== Higher education =====
Higher education is regulated nationally by the University Grants Commission, under which most universities begin the academic year in July/August and run two semesters (roughly August–December and January–May/June), with a second, smaller admission cycle in January–February for open/distance programmes since 2024–25. Undergraduate degrees traditionally last three years, though NEP 2020 introduced an optional four-year honours/research degree with intermediate exit points. Under UGC regulations, a full-time PhD generally takes three to six years.

==== Pakistan ====
The academic year in Pakistan normally starts from June/July till March/April for students in Nursery to Class 8. For students who are in Class 9 and 11, the year starts from June/July till February/March ending earlier than usual Academic Year so the students can be promoted to Class 10 and 12 (respectively). The academic year for class 10 and 12 is from March/April till February align with the 'board exam' during March through April/May. The students who are currently in or going into Class 10 and 12 would get a shorter 1 month summer break and one or two weeks of winter break based on the state in which they live. The summer holidays and vacations for the rest of the classes are as follows. In Pakistan, summer vacations last from the end of March or early April to the end of May or beginning or middle of June. Colleges and Universities usually start in July/ August, usually after Results announcements of the Board Exam and Admission but there are private universities or colleges which usually start in June/July. The colleges and universities follow similarly to the School Academic Year but usually divided into semesters or trimesters where students may be given breaks after the semester or trimester exams, usually for one or two weeks in December/ January and June/ July (and, for trimesters, in April/May, for ~2–3 weeks, but sometimes longer if the academic year ends here), autumn falls vacation as well as at beginning or middle of the end of September or early October (approx. 1 week) and at the end of December (approx. 1–2 weeks, aligning with Christmas/New Year holidays.

In Pakistan, Eid break begins in either depending on the month Eid occurs in that year. It lasts for about three days to one week depending on the state/union territory. Christmas break starts on the last week of December (22nd or 23rd) and ends on the first week of January (5th) or might last for only two days and a one-day break for the New Year again depending on the state/union territory. The festivals Ramadan and Eid are also given holidays for half a month and four days respectively which can vary again based on state/union territory.

In Karachi and Lahore, a southern state, a one-day holiday is given for Eid. Pakistan celebrates the Eid Al Rabi ul Awwal, a 4-day festival which, according to the Pakistan calendar, is usually celebrated from August 14. In Pakistan, the typical summer vacation runs from mid-May to the end of June, with school usually starting on August 1.

In Pakistan, Ramadan break is usually for 10 days, and Eid lies in the middle.

Christmas holidays are not usually given; however, some schools combine the Christmas holidays with the winter break. that is when the winter break starts for some. For some other schools, the winter break starts on 28 December and usually ends on the second weekend of the new year.

There are many public holidays in Pakistan, depending on the region. Certain holidays are mandated across the nation. Compulsory Holidays in Pakistan include:

March 23: Republic Day

August 14: Independence Day

December 25: Quaid-e-Azam Muhammad Ali Jinnah birthday)

States and union territories have their own dates for their state foundation days and their own list of holidays based on regions and States/ Union territories.

==== Indonesia ====
In Indonesia, there are four main school holidays:

- New school year holiday – known as libur kenaikan kelas (up-grading holiday), which usually takes place for 2–3 weeks between late June and early July. Dates may vary, depending on each province/region. The holiday starts from Monday of the first week to the Saturday of the last week of the break.
- Mid-term holiday, is a break that aims to separate the two semesters of the Indonesian school year. It takes place for two weeks between late December and early January, coinciding with Christmas and New Year holidays. The starting and ending dates are the same as the new school year holiday.
- Eid al-Fitr holiday (or lebaran holiday), which lasts for around two weeks. The date varies according to the Islamic calendar.
- Fasting Holiday / Ramadhan Holiday (or puasa holiday), which lasts for about 1 month. The date varies according to the Islamic calendar. This break mostly coincides with the Eid al-Fitr holiday. School usually starts on the first Monday of the new month. It can potentially last 3–4 months if the new school year holiday (libur kenaikan kelas) happens before or during the month of Ramadan. But, if Christmas occurs after the holiday of Eid al-Fitr, school will start in the new year. On the first day after the break, the students and teachers will apologise to each other and shake hands, known as "Halal Bihalal" this period lasts about 3 days, and after Halal Bihalal, parents will receive a "rapot" or a grade report which shows student achievement over the past year.

Besides the main holidays, there are many small holidays which take place for 1–2 days, such as Independence Day, religious breaks, and Teachers' Day.

==== Israel ====
In Israel, the school year begins on September 1. The last day of school is June 30 for primary school and middle school, and June 20 for high schools. In universities and colleges, the academic year is divided into two semesters. The first one begins in September or October (depending on the Hebrew calendar. Mostly a week or two after Simchat Torah), and it ends 13 weeks after in January. Then the next six weeks of January and February are dedicated to the first semester exams. Afterwards, in late February or early March, begins the second semester until mid- or late June. When the months of June and July are dedicated to the second semester exams while late testing can be by middle of August.

==== Japan ====
In Japan, the new academic year starts in early April. In most schools in Japan, there are four main breaks: one or two weeks from late March to early April (Spring) (Note: Universities and colleges usually have much longer spring break starting as early as the end of January to the beginning of February for private schools & late February to early March for National & public ones, due to entrance exams taking place between mid-January and early March.), about a month from late July to the end of August (Summer), the Health & Sports Day weekend (Fall), and two weeks over the year-end and New Year period from late December to early January (Winter). There are some exceptions in northern Japan, where schools set a longer winter break, while cutting the summer one shorter. Additionally, there are 4 national holidays falling between 29 April and 5 May (where the remaining days inside that period are also converted to public holidays), informally called "Golden Week."

Colleges/universities have the following breaks (plus the "Golden Week" holidays):

- Spring break: Early February to early April
- Summer break: Early August to early October
- Fall break: Health & Sports Day weekend
- Winter break: Late December to early January

==== Korea ====
In Korea, the school year starts at the beginning of March. Until 2015, schools followed a three-term system, similar to Japan:

- Term 1: Early March to mid/late July
  - Summer break: Approximately 1 month
- Term 2: Mid/late August to late December (with a brief 3–5 day Chuseok/Fall break interrupting this term)
  - Winter break: Approximately 1 month
- Term 3: 2 weeks in February
  - Spring break: Approximately 2 weeks

From 2015 onwards, the calendar was changed to a more quasi-Western styled one, having the year to end on January rather than February.

- 1st quarter: March to early May
  - Spring break: Approximately 1 week
- 2nd quarter: Early/mid May to mid/late July
  - Summer break: Approximately 1 month
- 3rd quarter: Mid/late August to late September
  - Chuseok/Fall break: Approximately 1 week
- 4th quarter: October to early January
  - Winter break: Approximately 2 months

Colleges/universities get the following breaks:

- Children's Day/Spring break: May 5
- Summer break: Mid-late June to August 31
- Chuseok/Fall break: 3–5 days in late September
- Winter break: Mid-late December to February 28/29

==== Malaysia ====
In Malaysia, there are 2 main semester holiday and an additional of mid-term break and year end holiday. The mid-year holidays last for two weeks, from late May until mid-June, in between the two school terms. The year-end holidays last for six weeks, from mid-November until early January, in between two school years. Each school term has a mid-term break; one week in March for the first semester and one week in the months of August or September (variable) for the second semester.

Schools are closed on national and state public holidays. Schools are allowed to have a few special holidays without replacement for events such as school anniversaries and sports days. For festivities such as Hari Raya Puasa, Chinese New Year and Deepavali, schools usually apply for additional holidays to allow longer breaks for students to visit relatives in their hometowns. However, every day missed exceeding the special holiday allowance would be replaced by having classes on weekends.

==== Philippines ====
In the Philippines, until 2020 the school calendars began in June and ended in March or early April. By government regulation, schools cannot start classes beyond August or earlier than June. There are three breaks: summer break (at the end of the 4th quarter) started from the late March or early April and usually ended in June, semestral break (at the end of the 2nd quarter) started from late October ending in early November (usually after the United Nations program) and Christmas break (at the end of the 3rd quarter) lasted from mid-December to early January. At the end of August around National Heroes' Day, a 3-day long weekend including the last Monday of August, was also taken.

During the implementation of COVID-19 community quarantines in 2020 to 2022, the school year ran from September or October to May or June, in 2021, it fell in August. The summer or mid-year break begins from early June till late or middle of August and is also known as the Independence Day break as Independence Day, June 12, falls during the mid year vacation. With the move of the calendar for most schools, an additional break, Easter break was added, corresponding to Holy Week up to Easter Sunday. Starting in 2024, a slow transition phase to the old calendar began only for public schools, with private schools having the choice to either make the transition back or to maintain the Western-styled calendar. Public schools and those private schools who have opted to join them are expected to open in June and end in April by school year 2026–27. In April 2026, DepEd implements a three-term school calendar in basic education, starting by SY 2026-2027.

For universities and colleges, the four breaks in their collegiate calendar (three for trimestral institutions) closely match those of the 2021 national basic education calendar. Since 2016–17, most of these higher learning institutions begin their year in August or September, matching the Western calendar.

Event-based holidays are declared by the President (for national holidays) and the provincial governor or city mayor for local holidays through the Department of Education (DepEd) for basic education and Commission on Higher Education (CHED) for colleges and universities.

==== Singapore ====
In Singapore, there are four school terms. Terms 1 and 2 are referred to as Semester 1, as terms 3 and 4 are referred to as Semester 2. Each term consists of ten school weeks. Term 1 starts the day immediately after New Year's Day. If the first school day is a Thursday or a Friday, it is not counted as a school week. After term 1, there is a break of a week, called the March Holidays. Thereafter, term 2 commences and is followed by a break of four weeks, the June Holidays. It is followed by term 3, after which there will be another break of one week, the September Holidays. Then, term 4 would start, and after it there is the December holidays, which would be either five or six weeks long, depending on whether the first week of the year was counted as a school week. Students are also given days off on public holidays, as well as Children's Day, Youth Day, Teachers' Day and the day after National Day.

==== United Arab Emirates ====
The following are breaks usually seen in Dubai schools, while other emirates also sometimes follow the Dubai holiday schedule:

- Summer Break: Usually from the end of June or first week of July to the end of August or first week of September.
- Diwali Break: Hindu festivals like Diwali (October/November) are also given a holiday or two, which becomes the fall break in the UAE.
- Winter Break: Typically three weeks, from the beginning or middle of December to the beginning of January; also includes the New Year's holiday.
- Spring Break: Usually from the end of March until early or mid-April.
- New semester: This break is given according to the board of the school, such as at schools under the Indian Certificate of Secondary Education (ICSE) Board which have a holiday within the first two weeks of April; for Central Board of Secondary Education (CBSE), it occurs typically after the summer break.

Other Islamic occasions are celebrated by a holiday or a short break, like the Eid break.

==== Vietnam ====
The academic year in Vietnam consists of two semesters, with the Tet break in between. The academic year starts in early September in the whole country, with an official opening ceremony on September 5 and ends on late May or early June.The two longest breaks include

- The Tet break or Lunar New Year holiday, which lasts between 5 and 10 days surrounding the Lunar New Year, typically starting 1–2 days before it. The break differs from year to year but usually falls on January or February.
- The summer break, which officially starts in late May/early June and lasts 3 months until the end of August. Many public schools, however, unofficially end the break a few weeks earlier and start classes in mid August.

=== Australia and New Zealand ===
In Australia and New Zealand, academic years for primary and secondary institutions are divided into four 10-week 'terms' per year. Although the school year was historically divided into three terms with an extended Easter break interrupting the first term, the Australian academic year has been divided into four terms since the late 1980s (with the exception of Tasmania which did not change until 2013); New Zealand adopted a four-term year in 1996.

==== Summer holidays ====
Following southern hemisphere seasons, the main summer holiday between academic years encompasses up to around half of December, all of January and sometimes a few days at the beginning of February, and always encompasses Christmas and New Year as well as usually Australia Day on 26 January. The exact start and finish date of the academic year varies between and sometimes even within jurisdictions; in 2024 Queensland started earliest on 22 January (the only jurisdiction to begin the academic year before Australia Day) and finished earliest on 13 December, while Tasmania started latest on 6 February and finished latest on 19 December. In Year 12, the final year of school, the term ends in November with exams taking place during late October and November; for those who go on to university, the term (commonly referred to as a semester or trimester) usually starts in late February or early March.

New Zealand celebrates Waitangi Day on 6 February; the summer holidays in New Zealand may or may not extend as far as that day, depending on the year.

==== Mid-term breaks ====
In Australia, there is typically a break of two weeks between each term, with some variation between states and territories (Northern Territory typically having a one week break after Term 1, and a three week break after Term 2 ). In the year 2000, due to the 2000 Olympic Games in Sydney, the state of New South Wales extended the break after Term 3 to three weeks.

In New Zealand, there is a two-week break between each term.

Historically, the Term 1 holiday have been scheduled around Easter, reflecting the three-term system's notion of an extended Easter break within Term 1; although since the mid-1990s this has gradually changed, and now only Queensland and Victoria tie the school holidays closely to Easter; the remainder of Australia and all of New Zealand now have a fixed length to Term 1 which leads to the Easter period falling within Term 1 in some years with an early Easter, such as 2016.

Typically, the Term 1 holidays will run for two weeks within April; the mid-year holidays encompass the first two weeks of July; and the Term 3 holidays encompass the last week of September and the first week of October. This varies between jurisdictions, and exact dates depend on what day of the week these respective months begin, as (with the exception of the beginning and end of the academic year), terms tend to begin and end with full weeks.

=== Europe ===
==== Austria ====
In Austria, the summer holidays are usually between early July and early September. There is, with the exception of Vorarlberg and Salzburg, no Autumn break but there is a Christmas break (from December 24 until January 6) and an Easter break (lasts for 10 days). The mid-term break in February lasts for a week and the Whitsun break lasts for 4 days including the weekend. There are also days off during religious holidays (Assumption, Ascension, Corpus Christi etc.).

==== Belgium ====
For Flemish speaking primary schools, the academic year in Belgium begins on the first weekday in September and ends on the last weekday in June, with the summer holiday comprising the entire months of July and August.

Secondary schools and universities often close about a week earlier, as soon as school results have been processed and published. A week of autumn break is usually scheduled during the week of All Saints’ Day (November 1). The winter- or Christmas holiday lasts two weeks and encompasses both Christmas and New Year's Day. The dates for both the one-week spring break and the two-week Easter holiday vary. In catholic regions where carnival is celebrated, spring break usually takes place during the carnival week. To get al balance in school days between spring break and summer holiday, the two weeks of Easter holiday can take place with Easter both at the beginning, the middle or the end of the holiday period. In some cases, when Easter is at the complete end of the holiday, Easter Monday serves as an additional day off. However, in 2008 Belgium did not have the Easter Weekend inside its break due to the fact that Easter Sunday was on 23 March and schools broke up on the first weekend in April 2008 and had the two weeks then.

==== Croatia ====
In Croatia, there can be anywhere from three to five major breaks throughout the school year at public schools, depending on the region. Regardless of the number of holidays a school decides to have, a school year must have a minimum of 175 working days, or 160 for students undertaking the final exam at the end of high school.

- Summer break runs from mid-June (typically the 15th/16th) to early September (usually the first Monday in September), usually lasting for 11 weeks.
- Winter (Christmas) break usually starts on December 24 (Christmas Eve) and ends in the first Monday after January 6. It lasts for 3 weeks in total. Some parts of the country have opted to split the winter holidays in two parts: the first part lasting for 2 weeks starting on Christmas Eve and encompassing Christmas and New Year, and the second part lasting for one week, usually the last week of February.
- Spring (Easter) break lasts about 10 days, and encompasses Good Friday, Easter, Easter Monday, and the work week after or before Easter.

Some schools have opted to shorten the winter holidays in exchange for an Autumn break, which typically lasts for one week around All Saints' Day (November 1).

Other free days include public holidays and local patron saint days. If these land on a Tuesday or Thursday, the day before (Monday, if the holiday is on Tuesday) of after (Friday, if it's on Thursday), is usually also considered a free day, to "merge" the holiday with the weekend.

==== Czech Republic ====
In the Czech Republic, the summer holidays begin at the end of the school year around 30 June and end at the start of the school year on 1 September or soon thereafter. Then there are autumn holidays: two days plus 28 October (the date of the proclamation of Czechoslovakia). The winter (Christmas) holidays last usually from 22 December to 3 January. There is also a one-day half term holiday on 31 January. The spring holidays are a week long and may occur in February or March, depending on the region, sometimes they continue with Easter holidays (Maundy Thursday, Good Friday and Easter Monday). There are also free days such as 1 May (International Workers' Day), 8 May (end of World war two) and 28 September (The assassination of St. Wenceslas - the duke and the patron saint of the Czech lands). The school director is authorised to add up to three more free days during the school year. The school holidays are determined by the Ministry of Schools for each school year and are valid for every basic and high school.

==== Denmark ====
In Denmark the summer holiday lasts 6–7 weeks. Most schools also have one week of winter holiday and one week of autumn holiday, usually in February and October respectively. The Christmas break lasts 2 weeks

==== Estonia ====
In Estonia, summer holidays last for three months, from June to August. Winter breaks last for two weeks, while autumn and spring are each one week, respectively. In 2017, the Estonian Ministry of Education and Research began scheduling a new "winter-spring" break, to balance the learning weeks between the winter and spring holidays. Thus, there are now five Estonian holidays—autumn (21-29 October), winter (23 December-7 January), the "new" holiday (24 February-4 March), spring break (21 April-1 May) and summer break (12 June-31 August). Depending on the year, summer break may, or may not, begin one week later or earlier.

==== France ====
French school holidays are scheduled each year by the Ministry of National Education. Due to the popularity of many French locales amongst international and domestic tourists, these periods can often see overcrowding in the larger cities and resort towns, such as the South of France, the Mediterranean coast and the French Riviera, as well as in Paris, Lyon, Marseille and Nice. The Alps, with their many ski resorts and winter activities, are especially popular around the Christmas holiday.

In an attempt to alleviate this issue, France's school holiday schedules are staggered by dividing the country's breaks into three different "zones" or periods. However, this division still does not lighten the flow of human traffic completely, as many families head to popular holiday spots all at once or on the same day, resulting in localised inflation and price increases, as well as potential availability or vacancy issues. Holidays are divided into three separate zones except for the first two—the All Saints' Day and Christmas–New Year's.

==== Germany ====
In Germany, around 75 weekdays in the year are school-free days. The exact dates are chosen by each of the 16 states, often in consultation with each other for reasons of planning and traffic management. The usual holiday blocks are: Christmas (about 2 weeks), Easter (about 2 weeks), Summer (6 weeks), Autumn (about 2 weeks). Depending on the state, there may be further holidays around Pentecost or in winter between the first and the second half of the school year.

Some states allow municipalities or individual schools to move a handful of days from a state-wide holiday to locally favoured dates, e.g. Shrove Monday, the Fridays after Ascension and Corpus Christi or some other Friday or Monday that would provide a long weekend and is called a Brückentag ("bridging day").

==== Greece ====
In Greece, there are three breaks throughout the school year at public schools.

- Summer holidays run from June to September. Holidays begin between June 10 and 20, and end around September 11.
- Christmas (Winter) holidays begin around December 23 and end around January 8 (about 2 weeks).
- Easter (Spring) holidays last 2 weeks from Lazarus Saturday to Thomas Sunday (according to the Orthodox calculations)
- Although there is no fall break, students and teachers get to have a day-off on October 28 (Oxi(no) Day).

==== Ireland ====
The dates for the start and the end of the school year at both primary and post-primary level are not fixed, but mid-year breaks are standardised. Due to the start of certificate exams, post-primary schools are usually not open for tuition after the Friday before the June public holiday (the first Monday in June) in any year. Primary schools must be open for a minimum of 182 days of tuition a year and for secondary schools that number is 166.

- First Day of School: The school year generally starts during the last few days of August or first few days of September. Return dates for Secondary schools are usually staggered depending on what year you are in.
- Halloween Break: Schools close for one week at the end of October for the midterm break. This break usually encompasses Halloween (October 31)
- Christmas Break: Schools close for two weeks at Christmas time. Those two weeks always encompass Christmas and New Year. Schools will close no later than December 23 and reopen no earlier than January 2.
- St Brigid's Day: Saint Brigid's Day is a public holiday in Ireland which falls on February 1. The public holiday is observed on the first Monday after February 1, or on a Friday if February 1 falls on Friday meaning schools are closed.
- Spring Break: Schools close for another week in mid-to-late-February for the spring midterm.
- St Patrick's Day: Schools are always shut on March 17 as it is a public holiday. If March 17 falls on a weekend, schools are closed on the Monday immediately following. Some schools may tend to take an extra day or two to extend this break. For example, if March 17 is a Thursday, schools will close on the Friday, and Monday following to make it a five-day break.
- Easter Break: Schools close for two weeks for Easter. Schools generally close for Easter break on the Friday one week before Good Friday, and reopen on the Monday one week after Easter Monday.
- May/June Break: Some primary schools may take another week off in May or June, if they have not taken a full week off in February.
- Summer Holidays: Secondary schools generally finish for summer on the first Friday of June or the last Friday of May. Exam years will sit 1–3 weeks of State Exams during June.

Primary schools will generally finish by 30 June, or the last Friday of June for summer break.

==== Italy ====
In Italy, most school holidays are determined by the Ministry of Education, and are valid for all public schools of every order and grade. Typically, there are Summer holidays from early or mid-June up to the second week of September. Christmas (Winter) holidays start on December 23 and end on the first or second working day after January 6; the summer holidays in Italy are 3 months, other holidays include one week around Easter (Spring) as well as one day on December 8 (Feast of the Immaculate Conception), one day for November 1 (All Saints (Autumn)), the national holidays of April 25 (Liberation day) and June 2 (Republic Day), as well as the Workers' Day (May 1). Locally, school authorities have freedom upon the establishment of the lessons calendar to grant further vacation days on important local festivals (e.g. the local patron saint day).

==== Latvia ====
In Latvia, summer holidays last for three months from June to August. Christmas holidays last for two weeks, autumn and spring holidays are each one week.

==== Lithuania ====
All public schools have the following holidays:

- Christmas Break – two weeks in early January
- Winter Break – 3 days in mid February
- Spring Break – 3 days in early April
- Fall Break – one week in late October to early November
- Summer Break – from early June to August 31 for elementary schoolers, from late June to August 31 for middle / high schoolers
- February 16 – State Restoration Day
- March 8 – International Women's Day
- March 11 – Lithuania Independence Restoration Day
- May 1 – Labor Day

==== The Netherlands ====
In the Netherlands, summer holidays last for six weeks for all Schools, but often unofficially 7 for secondary schools. The country is divided into three regions which start their summer holidays one week after another. Summer holidays usually start in mid-July and end in late August. Dutch elementary and high school students also have a one-week autumn holiday in mid-October, two weeks of Christmas holidays, usually the last two weeks of December, as well as one week "crocus/spring holidays" in February (for the south during Carnaval), and "May holidays", which last one or two week(s) for high schools and for elementary schools (This may differ from school to school). May holidays span a period of national holidays such as King's Day (former Queen's Day) (April 27), Remembrance of the Dead (May 4) and Liberation Day (May 5) and sometimes include Ascension Day and Pentecost.

==== North Macedonia ====
In North Macedonia, there are two breaks throughout the school year at public schools.

- Summer break usually runs from June 10 to September 1.
- Winter (Christmas) break starts after New Year's Eve (January 1) and ends usually after January 20.

Other free days include the public holidays and local or School patron days.

==== Norway ====
In Norway, school holidays vary by region. Generally, the school year starts around the third week of August. Most regions have a week off at the beginning of October (weeks 40 or 41). Christmas holidays start some days before Christmas Eve and end in the first week of January. There is one week of winter vacation in late February (weeks 8 or 9). Easter holiday is from Palm Sunday to Easter Monday or a day or two later, and Summer holidays begin some days before midsummer.

==== Poland ====
All public schools have the following breaks/holidays (with the 5 main breaks underlined):

- November 1 – All Saints Day, 1 day break
- Fall (Independence Day) Break – November 11, 1 day break
- January 6 – the Epiphany, 1 day break
- 1st Winter (Christmas) Break – Two weeks around Christmas and New Year
- 2nd Winter Break – two weeks in January or February (depending on region)
- Spring (Easter) Break – Maundy Thursday to the Tuesday after Easter Monday
- May Break – May 1 (Labor Day), May 2 (Polish Flag Day) and May 3 (Constitution of May 3)
- Corpus Christi – four days in May or June (depending on the year)
- Summer Break – first Saturday after June 20 to the end of August or early September (first school week day in September unless it falls on a Friday)

==== Portugal ====
All schools have basically the same period of a school year, it starts around mid September until mid/end of June (with some exceptions).

In Higher Education (Universities, Polytechnic Institutes, University Institutes, etc.) it can go from beginning of September to mid/end of July.

In Portugal, the majority of schools organize their school year in 3 terms, in Higher Education are organized in 2 semesters.

Aside to national holidays, the main breaks are:

- Christmas Holidays – around two weeks, from the week before Christmas to beginning of January
- Easter Holidays - two weeks, one before Easter day (always on a Sunday) and other after. Around end of March/beginning of April.

Usually there are other small holidays around Carnival (in February), around 2 or 3 days, but not every school does it.

Students from years that have Final Exams (9th grade, 11th and 12th grade), usually end their classes some days/weeks before the others.

==== Romania ====
Summer breaks run from late May-mid-June to early-mid-September and are around 13–15 weeks long. Pupils/students in the 8th and 12th grades usually enter summer break a week or two earlier than everyone else from other grades.

Spring breaks are usually one to two weeks long, between late March and early May depending on the dates of both Orthodox and Catholic Easter. There can be two spring breaks if the Catholic and Orthodox Easter dates are very different.

Winter break is three weeks long (it usually starts in the third or fourth week of December and it ends on the second or third Monday of January).

There is also a one-week long fall break, which is usually between late October and early November; however, it was limited to pupils in preschool and primary education; everyone else had a full learning period between the summer and winter breaks. Starting from 2022, though, the fall break has been applied to middle and high schools, too.

All academic years in Romania prior to the 2019–2020 school year used to have a second Winter break, which was often referred to as the "break between semesters" (vacanță intersemestrială), which would usually be in early February and have a duration of one-week, between the first and second semesters. From the 2019–2020 school year onwards (with the exception of the 2020–2021 school year), the start of the winter break marks the end of the first semester, with the beginning of the second semester immediately after the winter break. From 2022 to 2023, there is a break in February (however, this is not between semesters), and the counties can decide each which week of February.

==== Russia ====
All public schools have the following holidays:

- Winter Break – two weeks in early January
- Spring Break – one week in late March to early April
- Fall Break – one week in late October to early November
- Summer Break – from late May to August 31
- February 23 – Men's Day or Defender's Day
- March 8 – International Women's Day
- May 1 – Spring and Labour Day
- May 9 – Victory Day
- November 4 – Unity Day

==== Slovakia ====
In Slovakia, summer holidays begin at the end of the school year on June 30 and end at the start of the school year in early September. The autumn holidays are at the end of October. The winter (Christmas) holidays usually last from December 23 to January 7. The spring holidays are a week long and may be in February or March, depending on the region. Next are the Easter holidays (Maundy Thursday, Good Friday, Easter Monday and Easter Tuesday). There are also free days such as May 1, May 8, and September 15. The school director is authorized to add up to three more free days during the school year. The school holidays are determined by the Ministry of Schools and are valid for every basic and high school.

==== Slovenia ====
In Slovenia, summer holidays begin on June 24 (June 25 is National day, which is also a public holiday) and end on September 1. Other holidays are usually one week long, they expand if national holidays fall on the work days. The autumn holidays ("Krompirjeve počitnice" – "Potato holidays") begin around October 31, which is Reformation day and November 1 which is called "All Saints' Day". The New Year holidays usually start around Christmas and last until January 2. In the middle of February there are winter holidays, which are divided into two parts. In each part there are other Slovenian students who have holidays. The second part of the winter holiday usually ends at the end of February. The shortest holidays are First May holidays, and as their name suggests they begin on around May 1 (usually on April 27, which is Uprising Against the Occupation Day, which is also a national holiday) and last until May 2, which is also a national holiday. There are also free days such as February 8 (Slovenian cultural festival – Prešeren Day) and Easter Monday, and other national holidays like August 15 (Feast of the Assumption) fall on school holidays and are more important to adults. Students from the last year of primary and secondary schools usually start summer holidays one week earlier due to the final exams. These holidays are valid for primary and secondary schools only and are determined by the Ministry of Schools. University students, however, have summer holidays until October 1; however, the exams from spring examination period can be after 25 June and the summer examination period starts in September. Usually students have only one other holiday and that is the New Year holiday but it depends on every single college which days will be free for students. For example, in 2015, most university students also had First May holidays. Short holidays usually begin after exams and depend on how good students are at their exams or how many exams they have taken for each term. Most of the time, university students have holidays on national holidays.

==== Sweden ====
In Sweden, the school year starts around mid- or late August (early September at the universities). The week before All Saint's Day (taken as a Saturday around November 2) primary and secondary school students have an autumn holiday. Christmas holiday starts around December 19–20, depending on the day of the week on which Christmas Eve occurs. It usually ends some days after January 6, which is also a public holiday. In March, primary and secondary school students have one week of winter vacation; the exact week varies by location. Easter public holidays last four days from Friday to Monday. Easter school holidays are either the week preceding Easter or the week immediately following, depending on location. In late May, students in primary and secondary schools always receive two days off during Ascension Day and the Friday following Ascension Day. Primary and secondary school summer holidays last about ten weeks, usually starting in the second week of June.

==== Turkey ====
All public schools have following holidays:

- January 1 – New Year
- Winter Break (also called Midterm Break or 15 Day Break) – two weeks from mid/late January to early-February
- Spring Break – one week in mid-April
- April 23 – National Sovereignty and Children's Day
- May 1 – Labour and Solidarity Day
- May 19 – commemoration of Atatürk, Youth and Sports Day
- Summer Break – 11 weeks from mid-June to mid-September
- August 30 – Victory Day (coincides with Summer Break most of the time)
- October 29 – Republic Day (28 October is half day)
- Autumn Break – one week in mid-November

There are Ramadan Feast (3 days) and Sacrifice Feast (4 days) holidays, but exact dates of these holidays change every year because Ramadan & Sacrifice Feasts are calculated according to Muslim calendar, resulting these feasts to be celebrated earlier by 10 or 11 days each year. If these feasts are at the middle of the week, then the break becomes a full week break with the Arafah (the day before the feast) day also included in the break.

==== United Kingdom ====
School holidays in the United Kingdom follow a standard pattern, with a school year of 190 days of teaching, beginning with the Autumn Term, but the exact timing varies between countries and counties.

Private schools may follow different terms, and some self-governing academies follow different termly structures.

===== England and Wales =====
In England and Wales, local authorities set term dates which apply to all Community, Voluntary Controlled, Community Special Schools and Maintained Nursery Schools. Academies, Free schools, Voluntary Aided schools and Foundation schools are able to choose their own dates, but many follow the same dates as the Local Authority. Although these schools can set their own term dates, they are still required to open for the same length of time. Independent private schools tend to set longer holidays than state schools.

The academic year usually runs from the first week of September of one year through to the third week of July of the following year, with the time split up into three terms. Each of these is usually divided into halves with a week-long "half-term" break between. Primary (4–11) and secondary (11–16) schools usually follow a 39-week academic year, while further (16+) and higher (18+) educational establishments often have 33 or even 36-week terms, generally with no half-term break. Oxford and Cambridge universities have shorter terms still, usually eight weeks each term.

At English state schools, the year commences the first week of September, with a half-term break (one week) at the end of October, and the first term ending the third week of December. After a two-week holiday, encompassing Christmas and New Year, the second term runs from early January to Easter and is of variable length to allow for the movable feast. There is a half-term break around mid-February and two weeks of the Easter holidays, before the third and final term starts, lasting until the third week of July. The half-term break is at the end of May and students with exams will often finish their studies at that break and take exams during June and July.

Summer holidays in State schools are usually between five and seven weeks long, starting in mid-late July and ending in early September. Schools have Christmas and Easter holidays, each usually lasting about two weeks. The school year is split up into three sections: Autumn term (between Summer and Christmas); Spring term (between Christmas and Easter); and Summer term (between Easter and the Summer holiday). Roughly half-way through each term, pupils will get one week off school, known as half-term. In the Autumn term, half-term often falls the week of Halloween and close to Bonfire Night. In the Spring term, half-term tends to fall the week of Valentine's Day. In the Summer term, half-term tends to be at the end of May with students returning the first Monday of June.

Independent schools often have longer holidays including up to 10 weeks for Summer, but often have longer school days and sometimes lessons on Saturday mornings.

See English school holidays for the impact of school holidays on tourism and life for parents and others.

===== Scotland =====
In Scotland, the academic year usually begins in the third week of August. In October, there are one or two weeks off, which is the half-way point between Summer and Christmas holidays. The Christmas holiday usually begins a few days before December 25 and ends a few days after January 5. There is up to a week off half-way through the Spring term and a two-week break for Easter. After Easter is Summer term and the 3rd half term break is the half-way point to the summer holidays. The summer holiday usually begins at the end of June for most pupils in primary 1–7 and secondary years 1–3. Years 4, 5, and 6 have a period of exam leave at the end of April until early June, but may return for the last few weeks before the summer holiday starts. It's usually 7–8 weeks.

===== Northern Ireland =====
Schools in Northern Ireland have similar school holidays to those in the Republic of Ireland. Unlike in the rest of the UK or Republic of Ireland, Northern Irish schools operate a 200-day school year.

The school year begins around 1 September, although most schools return up to a week earlier. There is a midterm break in October, in which schools may close for two days to up to a week. This break falls during the week of Halloween. Schools close for a week and a half for Christmas, closing around 21 or 22 December, and returning on 3 or 4 January. There is another midterm in February, in which most schools close for one week. This break is the mid-point between Christmas and Easter.

Schools close for St Patrick's Day on 17 March. Schools close for Easter on Holy Thursday, and return one week after Easter Monday. Most schools close for a week at the end of May for the Spring Bank holiday, and return at the start of June. Schools then close for summer on the 30 June.

== See also ==
- Academic term
