= UK Parliament petitions website =

Website where the public can petition the British Parliament

United Kingdom Parliament petitions website
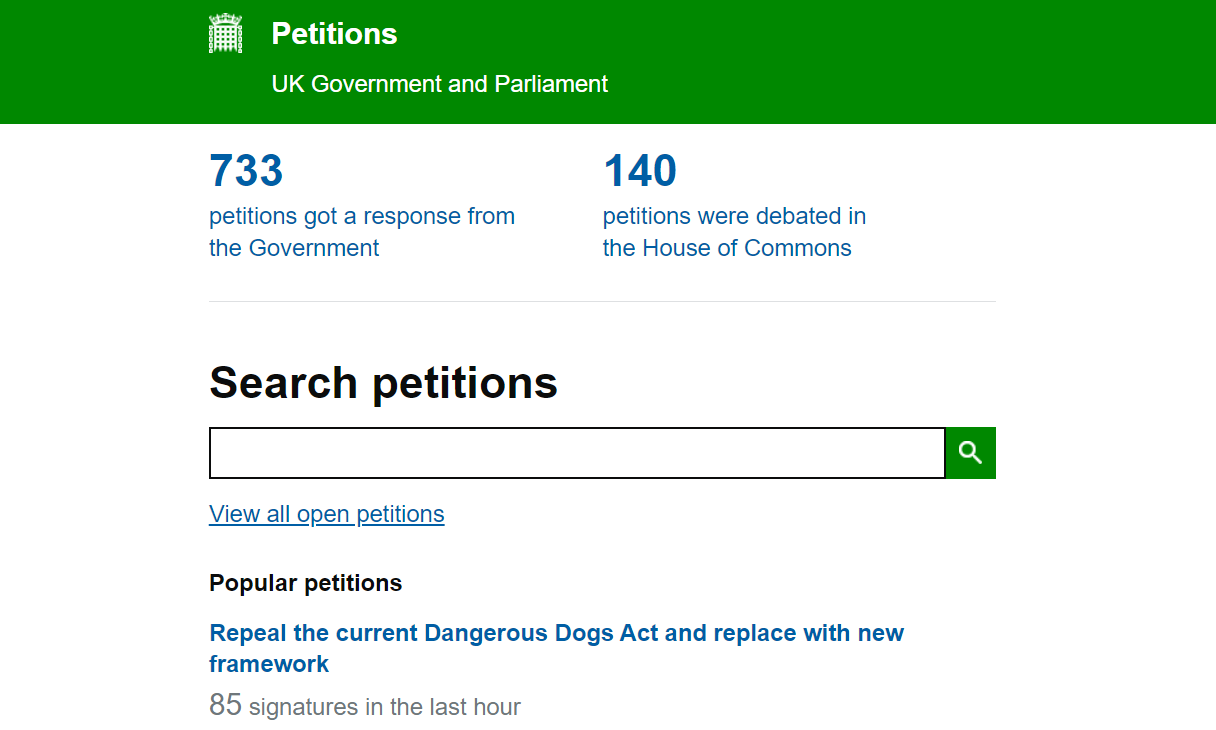
- Screenshot of the UK Parliament petitions website on 1 November 2022
- Available in: English
- Country of origin: United Kingdom
- Owners: Government of the United Kingdom; Parliament of the United Kingdom
- Website: www.parliament.uk/get-involved/sign-a-petition/
- Launched: July 2015; 11 years ago
- Current status: Online

The UK Parliament petitions website is an official online petition platform run by the Government of the United Kingdom and the Parliament of the United Kingdom that enables members of the British public to create and support proposals for consideration by the House of Commons. While the House of Commons' Petitions Committee reviews all petitions that receive 100,000 signatures or more, reaching this threshold does not guarantee a parliamentary debate. However, the Government is required to respond to all petitions that receive over 10,000 signatures.

== Process ==
Once a petition has been published on the website, it will be open to signatures for six months.

- At 10,000 signatures, the government will formally respond.
- At 100,000 signatures, the request will be considered by the Petitions Committee for debate in Parliament.

== Hosting and history of the website ==
The rights of petitioners and the power of the House of Commons to deal with petitions were expressed in resolutions of the Commons in 1669. The number of petitions being presented each year fell considerably in the twentieth century. In the early 2000s, both the Government and the House of Commons began to explore ways for the public to start and sign petitions electronically.

The original e-petitions process was created by Labour Prime Minister Tony Blair in November 2006 and hosted on the Downing Street website. Petitions were directed to government departments rather than MPs. Within the first six months, 2,860 active petitions were created and one received over one million signatures. The process was suspended prior to the 2010 general election.

The e-petitions were relaunched by the Conservative–Liberal Democrat Coalition government in July 2011. Petitions backed by 100,000 signatures would now be considered for debate in Parliament and the website was moved to Directgov. In the following year, a total of 36,000 petitions were submitted, attracting 6.4 million signatures. After the closure of the Directgov website, the e-petitions were moved to the new GOV.UK website in October 2012. Just over 30 petitions were debated in Parliament over four years. By 2012, research by the Hansard Society and discussions in Parliament proposed: giving more time for petitions to be debated by MPs outside the main Commons chamber, the petitions site being taken over by Parliament, and a Petitions Committee being established to look at how e-petitions work and which ones should get parliamentary attention.

The House of Commons Procedure Committee produced a proposal in 2014 for e-petitions to be run jointly between the House of Commons and the Government and for the establishment of a new Petitions Committee to consider petitions for a debate in the House of Commons and scrutinise the Government's response. The Petitions Committee was formed in 2015 during David Cameron's Conservative government and e-petitions were relaunched in July 2015 on the Parliament website.

Since 2015, the website is hosted by Unboxed, a digital consultancy from the UK, which was often quoted in the national news surrounding the very popular petition of March 2019 which crashed the website database and forced the provider to scale up its hosting and tweak its code.

== Notable petitions ==
As of March 2019 the petition with the most signatures, with 6.1 million signatories, is a petition requesting the revocation of Article 50 and for the United Kingdom to remain in the European Union. Started on 12 February 2019, it acquired more than 4 million signatures in 48 hours, between 21 March and 23 March 2019, following Prime Minister Theresa May's speech to the nation after the UK had requested that the Article 50 period be extended and a public campaign by political groups. Internet traffic to the UK Parliament Petitions website was so high that the website crashed multiple times during the initial 24 hours of the petition's public campaign.

The second most signed petition, with 4.2 million signatories, requested that Parliament hold another referendum on the UK's membership of the European Union if the result of the June 2016 "Brexit" referendum was "less than 60% based on a turnout less than 75%" (which threshold was not reached), but Parliament did not comply with the petitioners' request. This petition had been started in May 2016 before the Brexit referendum, by a supporter of Brexit, who stated that he was unhappy that the petition was signed by supporters of Remain following the referendum result.

A 2007 petition to oppose plans to introduce road pricing gathered 1.8 million signatures on an earlier version of the petitions website hosted on the Downing Street website. Prime Minister Tony Blair emailed all those who signed to inform them that trials would still go ahead.

In 2015, a petition called for legalisation of cannabis in the United Kingdom attracted more than 200,000 signatures and was debated in parliament.

A petition in December 2015 sought to ban Donald Trump from entering the UK; this gained more than 550,000 signatories and caused the website to crash. A subsequent petition launched in January 2017 called for Donald Trump to be banned from an official state visit to the UK following his election as U.S. president, and received over 1.8 million signatures. Neither petition was successful.

In March 2016, a petition calling for provision of meningitis B vaccine to all children in the UK received over 800,000 signatures, and the issue was subsequently debated in Parliament.

In October 2020, footballer Marcus Rashford began a petition which gathered 1 million signatures. The petition called for the end of child food poverty with three demands: expand access to Free School Meals, provide meals and activities during holidays to stop holiday hunger and increase the value of and expand the Healthy Start scheme.

In November 2024, a petition was initiated calling for a general election in the UK after the Labour party allegedly broke several campaign promises following the 2024 general election. This petition was signed over 1 million times within a 24-hour period, and has the most signatures of any petition for this government, reaching over 3 million signatures. It was debated in Parliament on 6 January 2025.

In September 2025 a petition opposing digital ID cards was signed more than 2.6 million times.

=== Petitions with more than 500,000 signatures ===
Petition	Signatures	Status	Request	Year	Details
Revoke Article 50 and remain in the EU (Petition 241584)	6,103,056	Closed	The government repeatedly claims exiting the EU is 'the will of the people'.	2019	On 26 March 2019 the Commons Petitions Committee approved the motion for debate in Parliament, along with two other motions from smaller petitions concerning Brexit, on 1 April 2019. At the time of this decision the number of signatures stood at 5.75 million. The government responded immediately following this announcement, and prior to the debate, rejecting calls to revoke Article 50. The Government's response: "This Government will not revoke Article 50. We will honour the result of the 2016 referendum and work with Parliament to deliver a deal that ensures we leave the European Union." The debate took place on 1 April 2019.
EU Referendum Rules triggering a 2nd EU Referendum (Petition 131215)	4,150,262	Closed	We the undersigned call upon HM Government to implement a rule that if the remain or leave vote is less than 60% based a turnout less than 75% there should be another referendum.	2016	Rejected after debate in Parliament. With Government response: "The European Union Referendum Act received Royal Assent in December 2015, receiving overwhelming support from Parliament. The Act did not set a threshold for the result or for minimum turnout."
Call a General Election (Petition 700143)	3,084,714	Closed	I would like there to be another General Election. I believe the current Labour Government have gone back on the promises they laid out in the lead up to the last election.	2024	Rejected after debate in Parliament on 6 January 2025. The Government's response: "This Government was elected on a mandate of change at the July 2024 general election. Our full focus is on fixing the foundations, rebuilding Britain, and restoring public confidence in government."
Do not introduce Digital ID cards (Petition 730194)	2,984,192	Closed	We demand that the UK Government immediately commits to not introducing a digital ID cards. There are reports that this is being looked at.	2025	Debated in Parliament on 8 December 2025. The Government's response: "We will introduce a digital ID within this Parliament to help tackle illegal migration, make accessing government services easier, and enable wider efficiencies. We will consult on details soon."
Prevent Donald Trump from making a State Visit to the United Kingdom (Petition 171928)	1,863,708	Closed	Donald Trump should be allowed to enter the UK in his capacity as head of the US Government, but he should not be invited to make an official State Visit because it would cause embarrassment to Her Majesty the Queen.	2017	Rejected after debate in Parliament. With Government response "HM Government believes the President of the United States should be extended the full courtesy of a State Visit. We look forward to welcoming President Trump once dates and arrangements are finalised."
Do not prorogue Parliament (Petition 269157)	1,722,935	Closed	Parliament must not be prorogued or dissolved unless and until the Article 50 period has been sufficiently extended or the UK's intention to withdraw from the EU has been cancelled.	2019	Boris Johnson's request to prorogue parliament for five weeks from mid-September was approved by the Queen, but was later ruled unlawful by the UK Supreme Court.
End child food poverty – no child should be going hungry (Petition 554276)	1,113,889	Closed	Government should support vulnerable children & #endchildfoodpoverty by implementing 3 recommendations from the National Food Strategy to expand access to Free School Meals, provide meals & activities during holidays to stop holiday hunger & increase the value of and expand the Healthy Start scheme	2020	Debated in Parliament on 24 May 2021
Call an immediate general election (Petition 727309)	1,059,231	Closed	We want an immediate general election to be held. We think the majority need and want change.	2025	Debated in Parliament on 12 January 2026.
Call an immediate general election to end the chaos of the current government (Petition 619781)	906,624	Closed	Call an immediate general election so that the people can decide who should lead us through the unprecedented crises threatening the UK.	2022	Debated in Parliament on 17 October 2022
Give the Meningitis B vaccine to ALL children, not just newborn babies. (Petition 108072)	823,349	Closed	"All children are at risk from this terrible infection, yet the Government plan to only vaccinate 2-5 month olds. There needs to be a rollout programme to vaccinate all children, at least up to age 11. Meningococcal infections can be very serious, causing MENINGITIS, SEPTICAEMIA & DEATH."	2015	Debated in Parliament on 25 April 2016, prior to which the following government response was provided on 1 March 2016: "MenB vaccine is offered to infants, free on the NHS, at 2 months with further doses at 4 and 12 months. The programme, as advised by independent experts, offers protection to those at highest risk."
Introduce offshore detention/mass deportation for illegal migrants (Petition 737105)	720,774	Closed	The Government should seek to establish offshore detention facilities for individuals who enter the UK illegally, to process them and arrange their deportation.	2025	Waiting for a debate.
Include self-employed in statutory sick pay during Coronavirus. (Petition 300336)	699,598	Closed	4.8 million people are registered self-employed in the UK. Figures are of 2017 according to the Office of National Statisticics. It would be easy enough to work out what each person is entitled to based on their tax returns. Include self-employed in statutory sick pay.	2020	Not debated in parliament.
Make verified ID a requirement for opening a social media account. (Petition 575833)	696,955	Closed	Make it a legal requirement when opening a new social media account, to provide a verified form of ID. Where the account belongs to a person under the age of 18 verify the account with the ID of a parent/guardian, to prevent anonymised harmful activity, providing traceability if an offence occurs.	2021	Debated in Parliament on 28 February 2022, and considered in the Petitions Committee's report on 'Tackling Online Abuse’ - along with several similar e-petitions. "The Petitions Committee report welcomes the Government’s planned Online Safety Bill and calls for the duties it would place on social media companies to deal with abuse aimed at adults on their platforms to be strengthened."
Close Schools/Colleges down for an appropriate amount of time amidst COVID19. (Petition 300403)	685,394	Closed	We would like the government to at least consider closing schools/colleges down in the coming weeks or as soon as possible, in addition to taking necessary actions to prevent further spread.	2020	Not debated in parliament.
Prevent gyms closing due to a spike in Covid 19 cases (Petition 333869)	621,440	Closed	In the event of a spike we would like you not to close gyms as a measure to stop any spread of Covid. Also for gyms to not be put in the same group as pubs in terms of risk or importance. Gyms are following strict guidelines and most members are following rules in a sober manner.	2020	Debated in parliament on 23 November 2020.
Bad owners are to blame not the breed - don't ban the XL bully (Petition 643611)	621,046	Closed	I believe that the XL bully is a kind, beautiful natured breed that loves children and people in general, and are very loyal and loving pets.	2023	Debated in parliament on 27 November 2023.
Leave the EU without a deal in March 2019. (Petition 229963)	608,152	Closed	We are wasting Billions of pounds of taxpayers money trying to negotiate in a short space of time. Leaving the EU in March 2019 will allow the UK good time to negotiate more efficiently. The EU will be more eager to accept a deal on our terms having lost a major partner.	2018	Debated in Parliament on 14 January 2019, prior to which the following government response was provided on 14 December 2018: "The deal that we have reached with the EU is the right one for the United Kingdom. Leaving without a deal would risk uncertainty for the economy, for business and for citizens."
Ban all ISIS members from returning to UK (Petition 231521)	598,254	Closed	Ban all ISIS members from returning to the UK, remove their citizenship and passports	2018	Debated in Parliament on 18 March 2019, prior to which the following government response was provided on 27 November 2018: "British citizenship can be removed if it does not render the individual stateless. Any risk posed by those who return from Syria will be managed and they may be investigated for criminal offences."
Block Donald J Trump from UK entry (Petition 114003)	586,930	Closed	The signatories believe Donald J Trump should be banned from UK entry entry.	2015	Debated in Parliament on 18 January 2016, prior to which the following government response was provided on 29 December 2015: "The Government has a policy of not routinely commenting on individual immigration or exclusion cases."
Reduce University student tuition fees from £9250 to £3000 (Petition 550344)	581,287	Closed	Call on the government to consider holding debates in Parliament between MPs and university students to raise/discuss issues that affect them. It will allow students to voice their opinions and concerns about tuition fees of £9250 a year which are too high, particularly as grants have been removed	2020	Debated in parliament on 25 October 2021.
Repeal the Online Safety Act (Petition 722903)	550,137	Closed	We believe that the scope of the Online Safety act is far broader and restrictive than is necessary in a free society.	2025	Debated in Parliament on 15 December 2025.
Prioritise teachers, school and childcare staff for Covid-19 vaccination (Petition 554316)	508,830	Closed	Advice from the JCVI on the priority groups for a Covid-19 vaccine does not include school/childcare workers. This petition calls for these workers, who cannot distance or use PPE, to be kept safe at work by being put on the vaccine priority list when such a list is adopted into government policy.	2020	Debated in parliament on 11 January 2021.
