= PetitionOnline =

Internet petition service

- Website type: Internet petition
- Dissolved: 2014
- Country of origin: United States
- Owner: Change.org, Inc.
- Creators: Artifice, Inc.
- Website: www.petitiononline.com
- Launched: 1999
- Current status: Shutdown September 30, 2014

PetitionOnline was the first widely known Internet petition service that allowed users to create and sign petitions. It went live in 1999, was acquired by Change.org in 2011 and shut down in 2014.

== History ==
It was launched and trademarked in 1999 by Artifice, Inc., a private 3D modeling software company launched and led by Kevin Michael Matthews, a professor at the University of Oregon during the 1990s. By the end of February 2000, Matthews had included and trademarked the site's slogan: "This is the marketplace of free ideas".

In 2011, the service was acquired by Change.org. It underwent a design change on October 30, 2011.

On September 30, 2014, PetitionOnline shut down citing increased costs of web hosting and development.

== Functioning ==
A petition that gathered a required number of signatures could be delivered by its creator to its intended recipient, usually by e-mail. According to the site itself, as of October 29, 2011, it had collected over 93 million signatures. By October 2000, the petitions were grouped into eight thematic categories, four of which were explicitly political: "Politics and Government – USA", "Politics and Government – International", "Politics and Government – State", "Politics and Government – Local", "Entertainment and Media", "Environment", "Religion", and "Technology & Business".

== In the news ==
Some of the site's petitions received outside attention for the issues they have stood for. The site claimed that its first official response to a hosted petition was from the "Dissatisfied Web TV Consumer Petition", in which Dennis Reno, senior director of Web TV customer service, responded to the claims of low-quality service. In January 2002, CNN wrote a formal apology to the National Association of Muslim Women, which posted the "Petition to Correct the Negative Portrayal of Muslim Women in CNN Program Coverage" on the PetitionOnline site in December 2001, over perceived offensive comments made by Leon Harris during the TalkBack Live program. Later that year, the New York Post promoted a PetitionOnline-hosted petition asking the ABC television network to keep country singer Toby Keith in its 2002 Independence Day special over the controversy regarding Keith's song "The Angry American".

In 2004, the petition "iBook Logic Board Failure" was part of the coverage over a threatened lawsuit against Apple Computer over defective iBook laptops. In 2005, the petition "Support for Nathan Warmack's Right to Wear his Kilt" received attention for the issue of the mentioned high school student's right to wear a kilt to a school dance in Jackson High School in Jackson, Missouri. In 2007, the petition "Filipino Americans demand for apology from ABC and Desperate Housewives" received media attention after the American television series Desperate Housewives included a line said to be bigoted against Filipinos.

Other claims of success through hosted online petitions include the introduction of Sci-Fi Channel Australia and the stopping of the possible closure of the San Francisco Japantown.

== Criticism ==
Some petitions hosted on the site have caused the credibility of the site to be questioned. One petition, titled "Let's Save America — Ban Anime Now!" is an example of a hoax petition that was easily created on PetitionOnline, intended to demonstrate the unmonitored oversight of petitions on the site.

== See also ==
- Internet petition

== Bibliography ==
- Ronzhyn, Alexander (2016), The Analysis of the Technological Platforms for E-Participation in Transition Economies of Ukraine and Russia, Social Science Research Network, pp. 1–12, doi:10.2139/ssrn.3002536
