= Childcare voucher scheme =

UK government initiative (1989–2018)

The Childcare Voucher Scheme was a UK government initiative aimed at helping working parents benefit from tax efficiencies in order to save money on childcare. From 4 October 2018, schemes were closed to new members as the system was phased out in favour of the tax-free childcare scheme. The scheme was offered as a salary sacrifice scheme: parents in the scheme could exchange part of their taxable salary, up to a specified limit, for tax- and National Insurance-free childcare vouchers to the same value.

For example, a parent given £55 per week (£243 per month) in childcare vouchers in lieu of the same amount of salary would save up to £933 in tax and NI contributions.

== Benefits ==
The nature of the scheme allowed many businesses to benefit from running a scheme. Although initially intended to benefit UK working parents, businesses which provided a scheme reduced their employer's National Insurance contributions, not payable on vouchers. Businesses also found other benefits in an increase in staff satisfaction and a reduction in staff turnover, saving indirectly on costs such as employing and training staff.

== Eligibility ==
UK working parents earning under a certain amount are eligible. The scheme is provided on a per-person, not per-child basis, so both parents can claim under the scheme rules. The scheme can be available at the same time as working tax credits, however, this may not always be beneficial. Employees who are currently enrolled and have been since the closure of the scheme are still eligible to utilise the scheme.

== Obtaining vouchers ==
Childcare vouchers are provided by an employer, usually through a childcare voucher scheme provider that an employer chooses.

== History ==
The Childcare Voucher Scheme was first introduced by Sue Harvey, Managing Director of the Luncheon Voucher Group in 1989 (36 years ago). Since then many people have benefited from using the scheme. In 2009 a petition was started on the "Number 10" website in order to stop the government from shutting down the scheme. Due to the recession the government had been considering shutting the scheme down, thereby increasing tax take. However, Prime Minister Gordon Brown decided against it. The petition finished with 93,000 signatories on it, and although now closed, is still available for viewing. In April 2011, the government did make cuts to the scheme such that high earners benefited less from the scheme by restricting the amounts that higher and additional rate taxpayers can receive tax- and NI-exempt.

- Basic rate taxpayers can have up to £55 a week (£243 a month) tax and NI exempt
- Higher rate taxpayers can have up to £28 a week (£124 a month) tax and NI exempt
- Additional rate taxpayers can have up to £25 a week (£110 a month) tax and NI exempt

The restrictions only apply to those who joined the scheme on or after 6 April 2011. Those who were already receiving childcare vouchers on this date can receive £243 a month tax and NI exempt until they stop receiving vouchers for longer than 12 months, change employer or no longer qualify for the scheme.

On 29 March 2018, as part of The Income Tax (Limited Exemptions for Qualifying Childcare Vouchers and other Childcare) (Relevant Day) Regulations 2018 it was announced that childcare vouchers would close to new members as of 4 October 2018. Those still on a scheme on that date can continue to use childcare vouchers until such time as they change employers or switch to the tax-free childcare scheme.
