= Revoke Article 50 and remain in the EU petition =

Online petition to the UK parliament

- UK Government & Parliament Petition

UK Petition
- Petition No.: 241584
- Open: 20 February – 20 August 2019
- Signatures: 6,103,056

Revoke Article 50 and remain in the EU was a petition submitted to the UK Parliament petitions website calling on the UK government to revoke article 50 of the Treaty on European Union, and remain a member state of the European Union. Following the referendum of 23 June 2016, in which the electorate of the United Kingdom voted by 17,410,742 to 16,141,241 to leave the European Union, the United Kingdom invocation of Article 50 occurred on 29 March 2017. This set a deadline for leaving the EU of 29 March 2019 which was later extended to 31 October 2019.

By 24 March 2019, the petition had received 5 million signatures, and is the most-signed online petition to the UK parliament on record; it reached 6 million on 31 March, and closed on 20 August with a total of 6,103,056 signatures, the highest figure obtained for any British petition since the 5.75 million claimed for the Chartists' petition of 1848.

== Background ==
On Thursday 23 June 2016, the United Kingdom held a referendum in which the electorate voted, by 17,410,742 to 16,141,241 to leave the European Union, with a turnout of 72.2%. As a result, on 29 March 2017 the UK Government invoked Article 50 to inform the European Council that they intended to leave the union on 29 March 2019. The European Council subsequently agreed that this deadline could be extended, and UK law changes are planned to do that. Following a ruling in December 2018 by the European Court of Justice that the United Kingdom may legally revoke Article 50, the petition to do so was started on 20 February 2019 by a former college lecturer. At first slow to accrue signatures, it grew in popularity after British Prime Minister Theresa May claimed that she would not be asking the EU for a prolonged extension to Article 50.

== Objective ==
The petition directly asks the government to revoke article 50 and therefore keep the United Kingdom in the European Union. It reads:

"The government repeatedly claims exiting the EU is the will of the people. We need to put a stop to this claim by proving the strength of public support now for remaining in the EU. A people's vote may not happen, so vote now."

== Support ==
On 21 March 2019 the petition reached one million signatures and had the highest recorded rate of any petition on the UK Parliament petitions website, almost 2,000 per minute, causing the site to crash due to high site traffic. It passed 4.5 million signatures on 23 March – the day that an estimated one million people protested in favour of a "People's Vote" in London – becoming the most-signed UK Parliament online petition, surpassing the previous record of 4,150,262 signatures. It is also considered to be the most-signed petition to the UK parliament of any type on record, surpassing a petition from 1990 that protested reductions to the ambulance service, which was signed by 4.5 million people. On 24 March the petition surpassed 5 million signatures. On 31 March it reached 6 million signatures.

The BBC cited expert opinions that the petition was unlikely to have been adversely affected by bots, as prior petitions had been. A Channel 4 report stated that it was possible to sign the petition using a false identity, but concluded that such manipulation would be reasonably obvious if it were being done on a large scale. It found no evidence of people boasting about hacking this petition in online forums, unlike another Brexit-related petition from 2016.

=== Heat map ===
A heat map published by gov.uk showed that urban areas with overwhelmingly remain constituencies signed the petition the most times, with especially large proportions of the electorate signing in Bristol, Edinburgh, Manchester, Oxford, London, Cambridge, and Brighton. In contrast, predominantly leave areas such as Walsall North, saw just 2.6% of the electorate signing the petition. People from Wales, Scotland and Northern Ireland, areas that largely voted to "remain" in the 2016 referendum, were slower to sign the petition, with the exception of Edinburgh which has a large student population.

=== Notable supporters ===
A number of celebrities and high-profile politicians have publicly stated that they have signed the petition, including;

==== Celebrities ====
- Annie Lennox, singer
- Brian Cox, physicist
- David Mitchell, comedian
- David Walliams, actor and comedian
- Gary Lineker, footballer
- Hugh Grant, actor
- Jennifer Saunders, comedian

==== Politicians ====
- Anna Soubry, Former Leader of The Independent Group for Change
- Caroline Lucas MP, Green Party
- Chuka Umunna, Liberal Democrats
- David Lammy MP, Labour
- Emma Dent Coad, Labour
- Heidi Allen, Liberal Democrats
- Nicola Sturgeon MSP, Leader of the Scottish National Party
- Baroness Jenny Jones, Green peer

== Outcomes ==
The Department for Exiting the European Union responded to the petition on 26 March, stating that it would not revoke Article 50: "We will honour the result of the 2016 referendum and work with Parliament to deliver a deal that ensures we leave the European Union. The government acknowledges the considerable number of people who have signed this petition. However, close to three-quarters of the electorate took part in the 2016 referendum, trusting that the result would be respected." The petition was debated in Parliament on 1 April 2019 in its secondary chamber, Westminster Hall.

== Petition author ==
The creator of the petition, 77-year-old Margaret Georgiadou, is a retired college lecturer. She said "I became – like every other Remainer – very frustrated that we've been silenced and ignored for so long." After two days she received death threats but she said her petition aimed to show there was a change in public attitude: "I want it to prove it (Brexit) is no longer the will of the people. It was three years ago but the government has become infamous for changing their mind – so why can't the people?". She reported receiving three anonymous death threats by phone, and a torrent of abuse via social media.
