= English school holidays =

Periods outside English school terms

The English school year runs from early September to mid- or late July. Most schools divide the year into three terms, each term divided into half terms:

- Autumn term runs from early September to mid-December (half term ends in late October).
- Spring Term runs from early January to Easter (half term ends in mid-February).
- Summer Term runs from Easter to mid-July (half term ends in late May/early June).

At the end of each half-term a holiday lasts about one week (usually nine full days, including two weekends), although in the autumn term, some schools give students two week long holidays (16 full days, including 3 weekends) to account for the term being longer than the other two.

The Christmas holidays separate the autumn and spring terms, and the Easter holidays separate the spring and summer terms. Each holiday lasts about two weeks.

The summer holiday begins in late July and usually lasts about six weeks, sometimes ending two weeks before the Autumnal equinox.

== Calendar ==
The local education authority sets the holiday dates for all schools under its control. Academies set their own dates, but often coordinate with other local schools.

Individual schools may be closed due to teacher training, bad weather, or other unplanned events.

== Independent schools ==
Independent schools (also known as "public schools" (age about 13+) and "private schools" or "preparatory schools" (under 13) in the UK generally operate a similar academic year, often with shorter terms and longer holidays. More traditional schools use the term names originating at Oxford University; namely Michaelmas term (October to December), named after the Feast of Saint Michael and All Angels on 29 September, Hilary term (January to March) and Trinity term (April to June), named after Trinity Sunday which is eight weeks after Easter.

Some international schools use semesters rather than terms.

== Economic impact ==
English school holidays have a major traffic impact. Holidays create a marked reduction in peak traffic congestion periods on many routes. England does not have a wide network of state-run school transport, leading many parents to drive their children to and from school.

English school holidays also affect holiday accommodation pricing. Holidays feature a steep rise in accommodation cost, due to increased demand. The English tourism industry monitors websites that provide up-to-date school holiday information, and adjusts prices accordingly. Prices often drop by hundreds of pounds one week into the new school term. Most schools have a strict policy against school absences. Parents who decide to save money by taking a holiday during term risk damaging their children's education and fines or warnings from their school. Parents can be issued with a penalty notice whenever they take their children on holiday with authorisation. Penalty notices can be issued by local councils, headteachers and their delegates and the police. Generally, schools allow no more than 10 school days of absence in any school year.

== Popular culture ==
The Swallows and Amazons series of children's novels by Arthur Ransome are all set in the school holidays, generally the long (August) summer holidays although some are set in Easter or winter. For example, in Pigeon Post, he wrote: "Term time was gone as if it had been wiped out. Real life was beginning again."

== See also ==
- School holiday
