= Beechwood, Merseyside =

Housing estate in Merseyside, England

Coordinates: 53.396°N 3.085°W

Beechwood
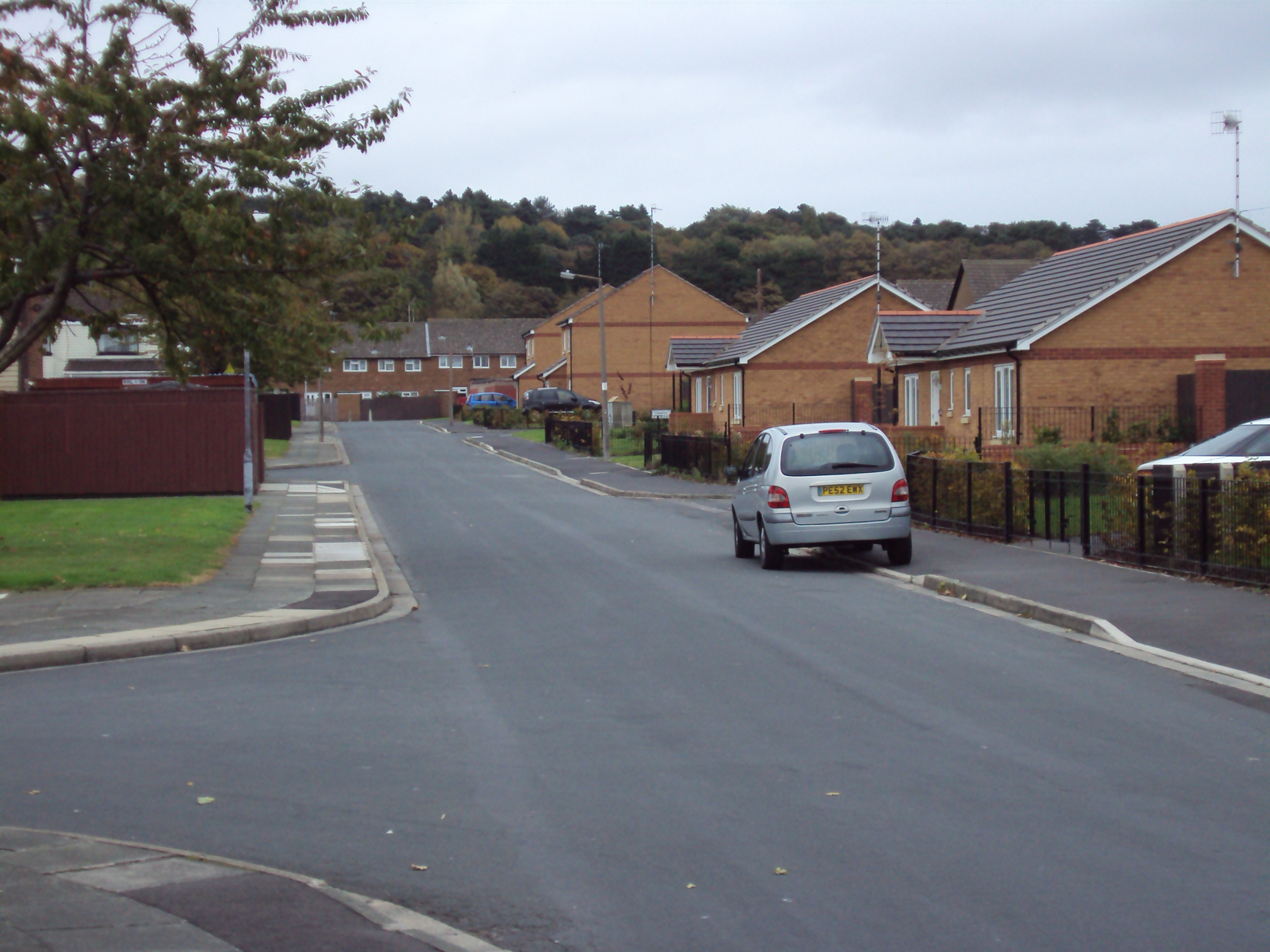
- Part of the housing estate, with Bidston Hill in the background.

- Location within Merseyside
- OS grid reference: SJ279893
  - London: 181 mi (291 km) SE
- Metropolitan borough: Wirral
- Metropolitan county: Merseyside
- Region: North West
- Country: England
- Sovereign state: United Kingdom
- Post town: PRENTON
- Postcode district: CH43
- Dialling code: 0151 6**
- ISO 3166 code: GB-WRL
- Police: Merseyside
- Fire: Merseyside
- Ambulance: North West
- UK Parliament: Birkenhead

Beechwood is a housing estate in the west of Birkenhead, on the Wirral Peninsula, in Merseyside, England. Administratively it is within the Metropolitan Borough of Wirral as part of Bidston and St James Ward. The area is bounded by Bidston to the north, Upton to the west and Noctorum to the south. The elevation of Bidston Hill is immediately to the east.

The estate was built in the 1960s as the Ford Estate and completed in the mid to late 1970s, to house people moving from the North End of Birkenhead and providing a better standard of living.

Most of Beechwood is former council property, bought from Wirral Borough Council by local tenants who formed a community housing association. Some of the council houses have been sold under the Right to Buy scheme. The estate is the most northerly of three housing estates within a mile of each other, the other two being at Woodchurch and Noctorum. The estate is now separated into three sections, these being Upper Bidston Village, Beechwood and Greenfields. In recent years the estate has seen significant redevelopment of the former wooded area at 6th Avenue and through the demolition of maisonettes, tower blocks, Manor County Middle School and residential care homes (Feltree House and Esher House), with the construction of new affordable homes by private investors.

At the 2011 census no population figures specific to Beechwood were available. However the total population of Bidston and St James Ward, which includes the estate, was 15,216.

== Geography ==
Beechwood is in the northern part of the Wirral Peninsula, less than 3 km (1.9 mi) south-south-east of the Irish Sea at Leasowe, about 7 km (4.3 mi) east-north-east of the Dee Estuary at West Kirby and about 4.5 km (2.8 mi) west of the River Mersey at Seacombe. The area is situated at an elevation of between 8–26 m (26–85 ft) above sea level.

== Governance ==
Beechwood is within the parliamentary constituency of Birkenhead. The current Member of Parliament is Mick Whitley, a Labour representative. He has been the MP since 2019.

At local government level, the estate is incorporated into the Bidston and St James Ward of the Metropolitan Borough of Wirral, in the metropolitan county of Merseyside. It is represented on Wirral Metropolitan Borough Council by three councillors. The most recent local elections took place on 6 May 2021.

== Local amenities ==
Beechwood is served by the Post Office, a social club, a children's centre and a health centre.

The estate has a small shopping area. Beechwood originally had five public houses: 'Seven Stiles' (its name was changed to 'The Fender' and after closure it became a children's nursery named Jack & Jills (to eventually be bought by Partou)), 'The Windmill' (closed and demolished after a fire), 'Buccaneer' (it was renamed 'The Fender' before being closed and demolished), 'One O'clock Gun' (closed and subsequently demolished) and 'The Corsair' (closed and demolished after a fire). 'The Windmill', named after the nearby Bidston Windmill on Bidston Hill, was the final public house on the estate to close.

There are two churches, the modern Roman Catholic church, which is St. Paul's, and the small, modern Beechwood Chapel which is an independent church.

== Education ==
Manor Primary School is situated at the end of Beechwood Drive (named 6th Avenue until the area was redeveloped). This was previously known as Manor County Primary and Middle Schools. In recent years the buildings of the middle school were demolished and both educational facilities combined, utilising the buildings of the primary school.

St Paul's Primary School is a Catholic school situated on Farmfield Drive (previously named Feltree Way).

== Transport ==
=== Roads ===
The M53 motorway runs along the western side of Beechwood and the nearest junction, Junction 1 of the motorway, is situated north of Beechwood. The A5027 is situated at the southern side of Beechwood and the A553 is to the north.

=== Buses ===
Until deregulation of the bus services, in 1986, the area was served by the forerunner to Merseytravel, the Merseyside Passenger Transport Executive (MPTE).

Present-day services are run primarily by Arriva, and are coordinated by Merseytravel. Beechwood has bus stops along Fender Way, the main road through the area. Merseytravel's daily "Saveaway" Area B and All Zones tickets are valid to use from any bus stop in Beechwood, on the basis of being for the passenger of relevant age, in-date and for use after 9:30am.

=== Railways ===
Upton and Bidston railway stations are the nearest to Beechwood, being situated at either end of the estate. These stations are both located on the Borderlands Line to Wrexham. Meanwhile, Bidston station is also part of Merseyrail's Wirral Line, primarily for travel to Liverpool and Chester. There is, however, a proposal for the construction of Beechwood railway station, which would be more centrally located to the area. This would be situated on the modernised and electrified Borderlands Line.

=== Cycling ===
National Cycle Route 56 passes along the western side of Beechwood, alongside Fender Way. This route goes from Chester to Liverpool via Leasowe and Seacombe and includes part of the Wirral Way, along its course.
