= Bidston =

Village in Wirral, Merseyside, England

Coordinates: 53.402°N 3.078°W

- Village
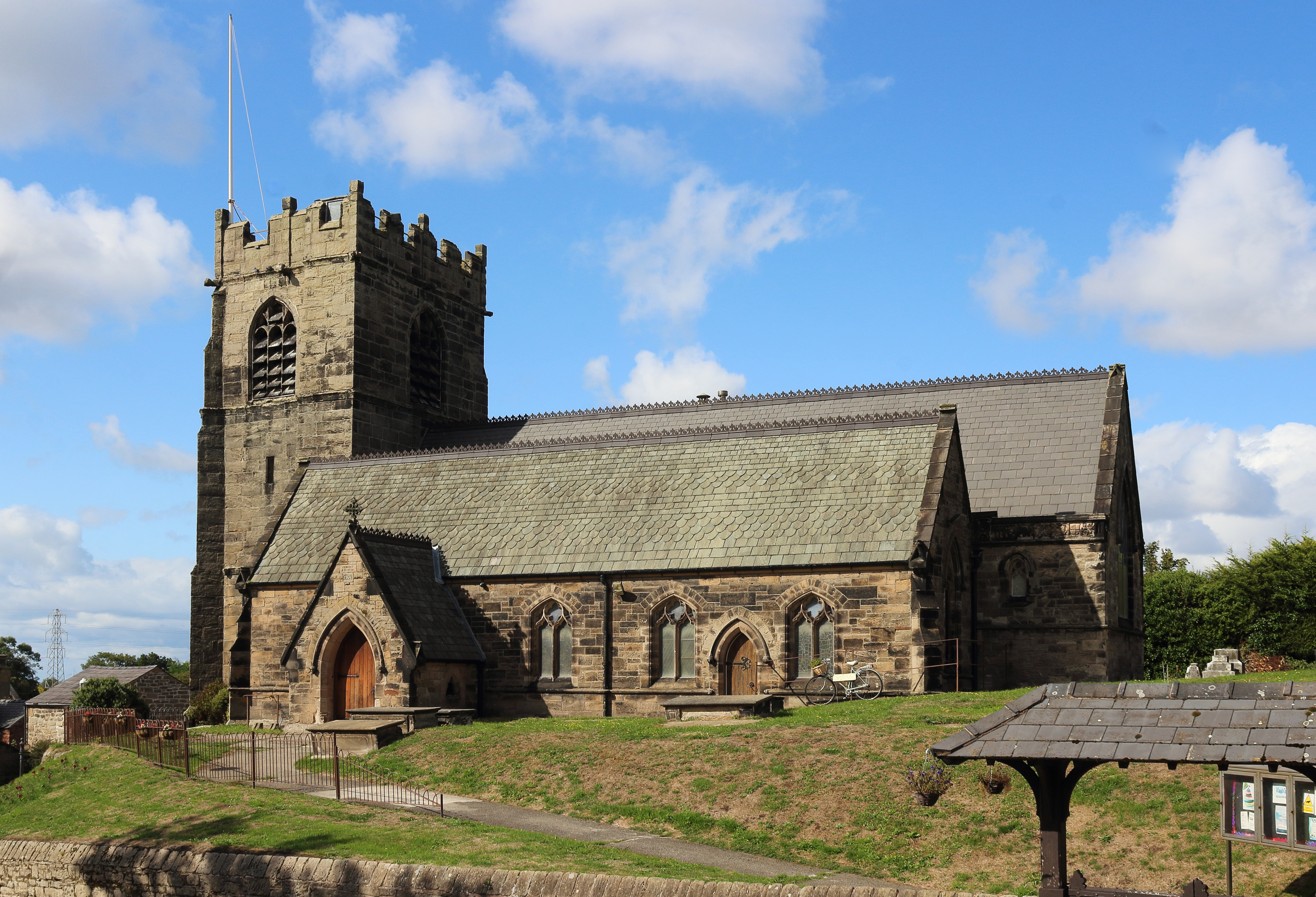
- St Oswald's Church

- Location within Merseyside
- Population: 15,216 (2011 Census)
- OS grid reference: SJ284900
  - London: 181 mi (291 km) SE
- Metropolitan borough: Wirral
- Metropolitan county: Merseyside
- Region: North West
- Country: England
- Sovereign state: United Kingdom
- Post town: PRENTON
- Postcode district: CH43
- Dialling code: 0151
- ISO 3166 code: GB-WRL
- Police: Merseyside
- Fire: Merseyside
- Ambulance: North West
- UK Parliament: Birkenhead

Bidston is a village and civil parish in the Metropolitan Borough of Wirral in Merseyside, England.

Administratively, it is a ward of the Metropolitan Borough of Wirral. Before local government reorganisation on 1 April 1974, it was part of the County Borough of Birkenhead, within the geographical county of Cheshire. At the 2001 Census, the population of Bidston was 10,446, consisting of 4,725 males and 5,721 females. By the time of the 2011 Census the electoral ward was called Bidston and St. James (St James is part of Bidston and not a separate locality). This ward includes Beechwood to the south of Bidston and extends into much of Birkenhead to the east, including all of the south side of the Great Float. The total population of this ward at this Census was 15,216 of which 7,117 were males and 8,099 were female.

== History ==
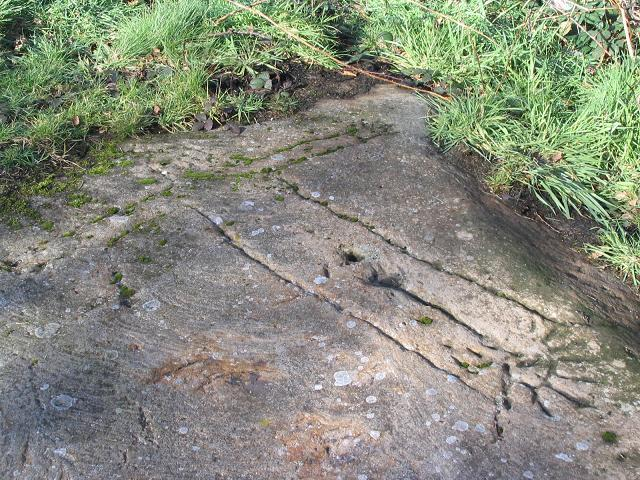
The Sun Goddess rock carving on Bidston Hill

Bidston has been occupied since the Mesolithic era, evidenced by flints excavated during the 1990s. Neolithic and Roman artefacts have also been discovered in the vicinity of the village. The circular nature of the St Oswald's Church grounds indicate an early origin to the site. Bidston Hill contains a number of ancient rock carvings, including that of a Sun Goddess, thought to have been carved by the Norse-Irish around 1000 AD.

The original parish of Bidston comprised Bidston, Moreton, Saughall Massie, Claughton and Birkenhead. Bidston Hall was originally held by the heirs of Hamon de Massey. The hall eventually passed to the Stanley family, after being purchased by John Stanley of Lathom on 24 June 1397.

The residential buildings in the village core date from between the 16th and 18th century. Typically, these are former farmhouses, farm buildings and cottages, constructed from local red sandstone. Many are Grade II listed buildings.

=== Early modern ===
The Liverpool to Holyhead semaphore telegraph was set up in 1826, on which Bidston had a signals station. This replaced a flag signalling station dating to 1763, and which itself was replaced in 1861 by an electrical telegraph. Along with the construction of Bidston Lighthouse in 1771, this facilitated shipping to the Port of Liverpool. Bidston Observatory was added in 1866, further enabling shipping movements on the River Mersey.

In the 19th century, Bidston underwent industrial expansion. The greatest effect was possibly the drainage of Bidston Moss, during the construction of Birkenhead Docks. By the end of the century, Bidston had also gained significant railway infrastructure with an engine shed and a railway junction where the Birkenhead to West Kirby, New Brighton and Wrexham lines met.

=== 20th century ===
A goods marshalling yard was added to the railway infrastructure by the early 20th century. During World War I, Bidston had an army training camp. Bidston Aerodrome opened temporarily in 1920, on the site of what is now the golf course. Bidston Dock was opened in 1933, remaining in use until the 1990s. During World War II, a German prisoner-of-war camp was temporarily established. Although never used for its original purpose, Bidston Hill's air-raid shelter was built from December 1941, having 2,213 bunks and 793 seats. The Gordon, a three-wheeled car, was produced in Bidston between 1954 and 1958.

The Proudman Oceanographic Laboratory's Joseph Proudman building was opened in Bidston in 1975, surviving until 2013.

== Geography ==
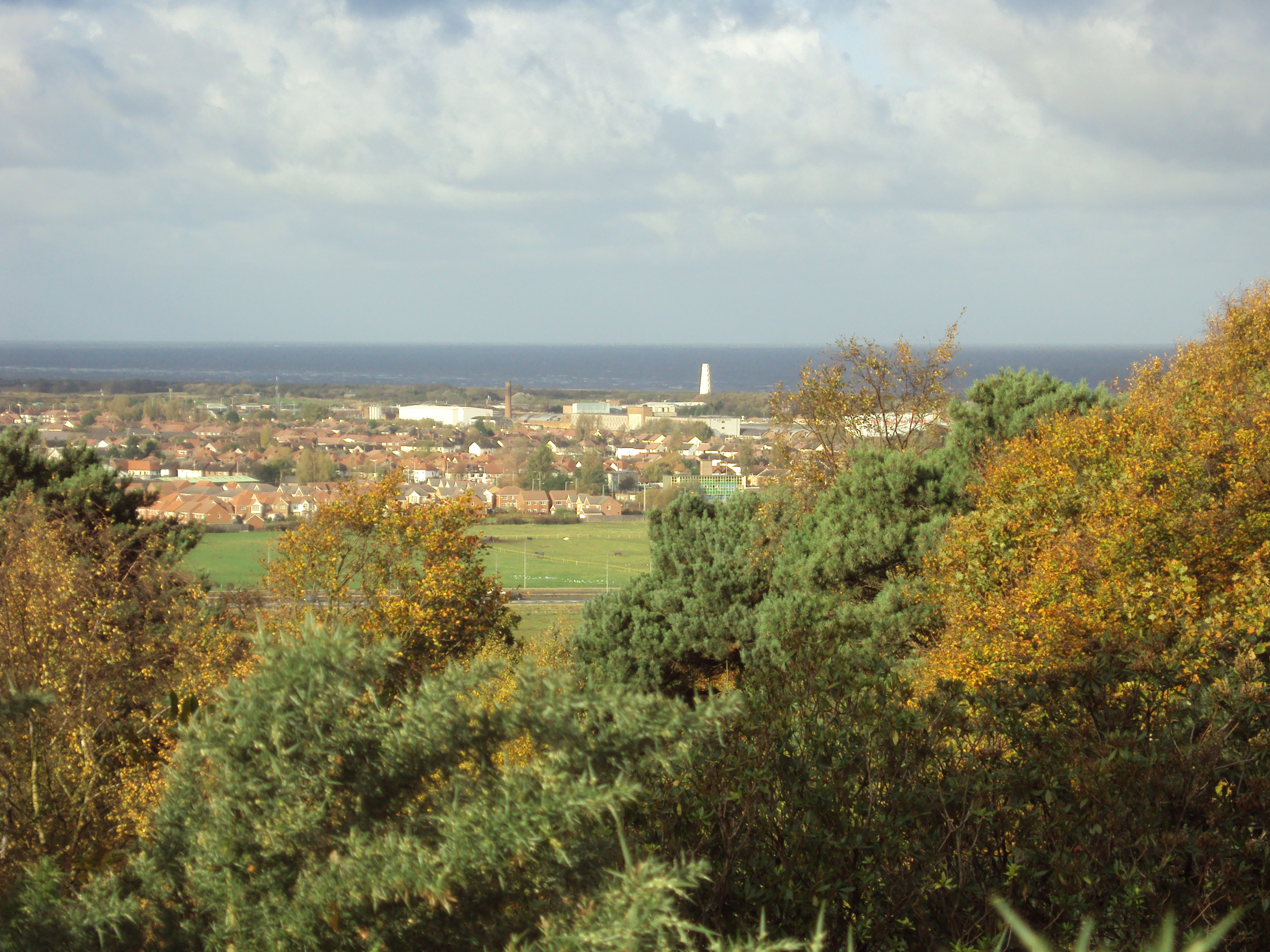
The view north-west from the top of Bidston Hill, across Leasowe and Moreton. The white tower at the shore is Leasowe Lighthouse, with Liverpool Bay of the Irish Sea beyond.

Bidston is in the northern part of the Wirral Peninsula, 1.9 kilometres (1.2 miles) from the Irish Sea at Leasowe, approximately 8 km (5.0 mi) east-north-east of the Dee Estuary at West Kirby and 4.2 km (2.6 mi) west of the River Mersey at Seacombe. The village of Bidston is situated on the north-western side of Bidston Hill, with the centre of the village at an elevation of approximately 16 m (52 ft) above sea level.

The Birket passes between Bidston Village and Bidston Moss, before discharging into West Float and then into the River Mersey.

== Government ==
Bidston is part of the Metropolitan Borough of Wirral, in the metropolitan county of Merseyside. The village is part of the parliamentary constituency of Birkenhead. The current Member of Parliament is Mick Whitley, a Labour representative. He has been the MP since 2019 and currently holds a majority of 17,705.

The area is also part of a local government ward of the Metropolitan Borough of Wirral, this being Bidston and St. James Ward. Bidston is represented on Wirral Metropolitan Borough Council by three councillors. These are Julie McManus, Ann McLachlan and Brian Kenny, who are all Labour councillors. Ann McLachlan is also the Deputy Leader of the council. The most recent local elections took place on 5 May 2016.

Confirmed candidates for 2016 United Kingdom local elections
Party	Candidate	Votes	%	±%
Labour	Julie MCMANUS	1702	69.2	−7.7
UKIP	Debbie CAPLIN	329	13.4	+13.4
Conservative	Nick HANNA	190	7.72	−2.98
Green	Jayne Louise Stephanie CLOUGH	107	4.35	−1.36
Liberal Democrats	Brian Downing GILL	82	3.33	+0.17
TUSC	Benjamin HALLIGAN	51	2.07	−1.53

The electorate numbered 9,985, there was a turnout of 24.6% and the majority is 1,373.

== Economy ==
=== Retail ===
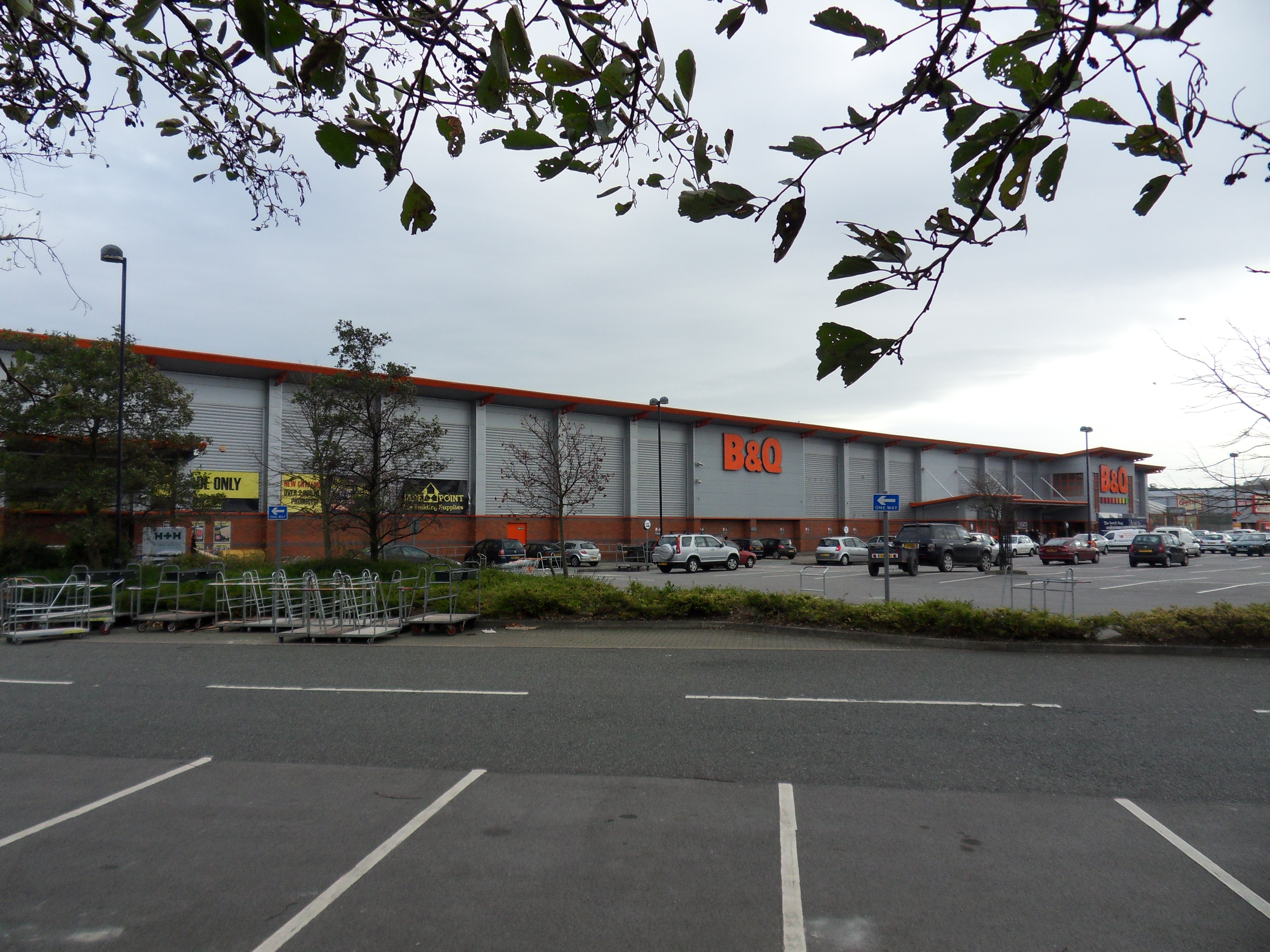
B&Q at Bidston Moss Retail Park

The major employers in Bidston are a 24-hour Tesco superstore and B&Q. The Tesco superstore and petrol station, built in the 1990s, occupy the site of the former Bidston steelworks and a disused railway marshalling yard. Meanwhile, B&Q operates within the Bidston Moss Retail Park, a 5.9 ha (15 acres) development built in the 1980s, which includes branches of Halfords, Home Bargains, Carpetright and Pets at Home. Marks & Spencer and Aldi each opened stores at the retail park in 2016. Other businesses, which formerly occupied the retail park, included MFI.

=== Industrial estate ===
The Valley Road Industrial Estate includes the premises of Park Group PLC, a Christmas hamper and pre-paid gift card provider.

Bidston Moss also has one of the main waste and recycling centres for Wirral, which is operated by Veolia. Originally part of the same site, the former Bidston tip was in operation from the 1930s, closing around 1997, and then landscaped as part of the Bidston Moss Nature Reserve.

== Community ==
=== Schools ===
Bidston Village Church of England Primary School is located in Ballantyne Drive, close to the centre of the village, and accommodates around 300 pupils. Holy Cross Catholic Primary School is located on Gautby Road. The Observatory School, located on Bidston Village Road, is a community special school serving pupils aged 11–16.

=== Churches ===
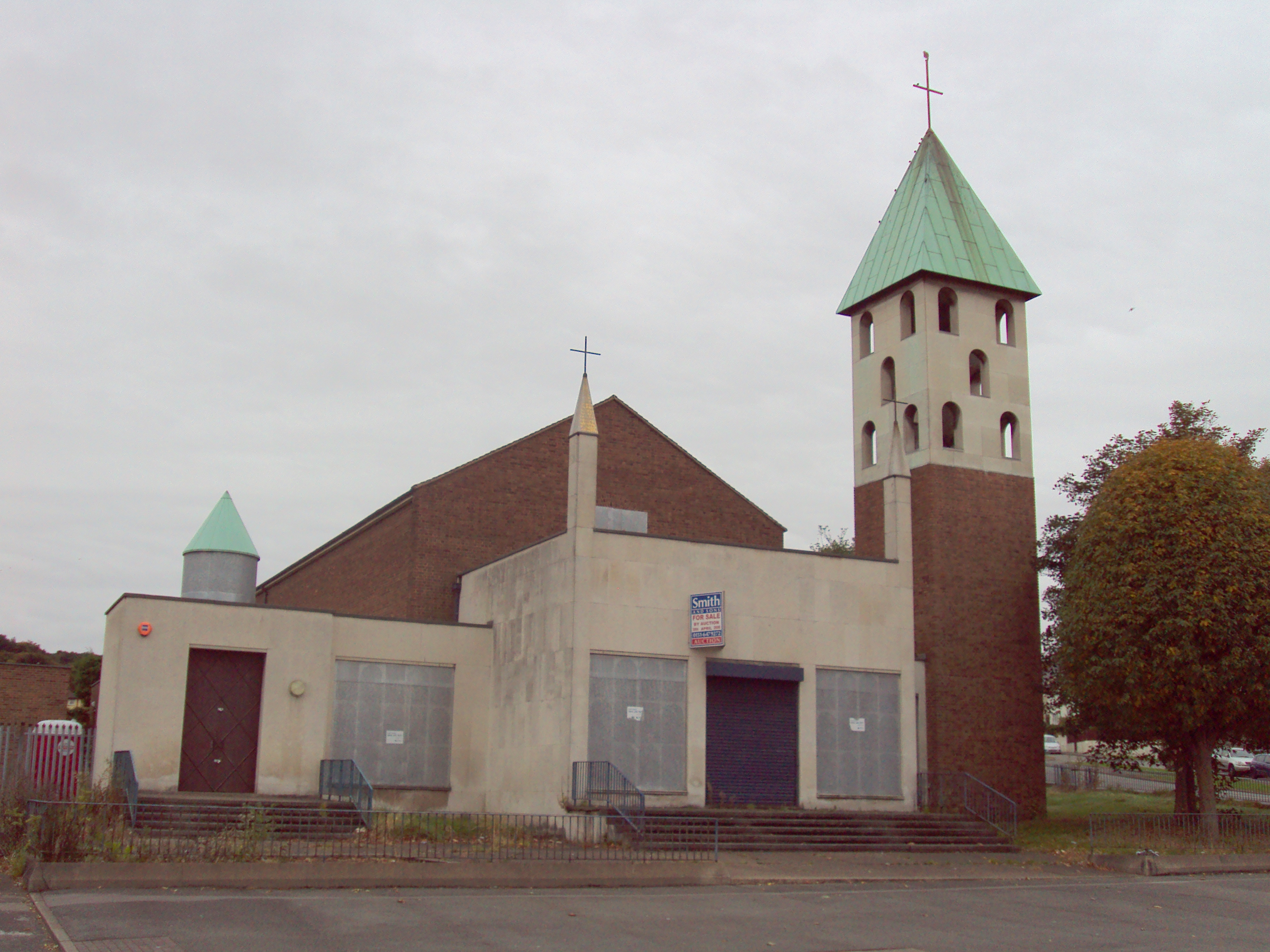
Holy Cross Church

St Oswald's Church is Bidston's Church of England church, and dates back to the 13th century. The current building has a 16th-century tower, with the rest of the church rebuilt in the mid to late-19th century. Holy Cross Church, the last designed by F. X. Velarde and built in 1959, is a Grade II listed building located at the junction of Hoylake Road and Worcester Road. This church is Bidston's local Catholic church but is now closed and boarded up. Bidston also has a Kingdom Hall of Jehovah's Witnesses, located in School Lane.

=== Leisure ===
A play and community centre is situated on Gautby Road, and a model boating lake is opposite.

==== Public houses ====
The only operational public house, within the vicinity of the village, is The Bidston on Hoylake Road. Bidston has had a couple of public houses closer to the centre of the village. The Ring 'o Bells Inn closed in 1868, and is now a residential property. The Corsair closed prior to 2009, and the site was approved for a residential construction in 2015.

==== Parks, commons and other green spaces ====
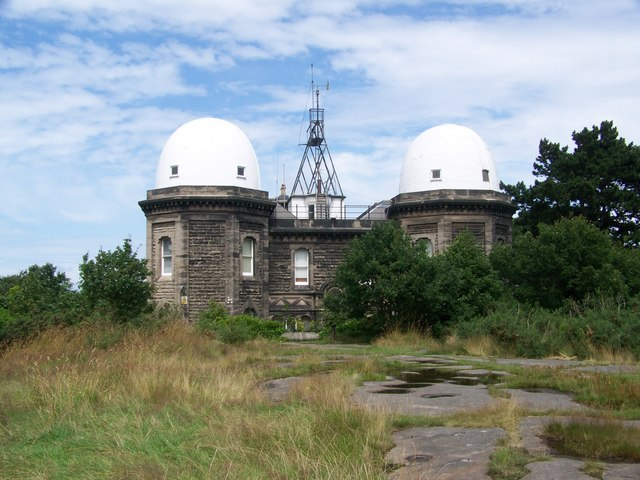
Bidston Observatory on Bidston Hill

Bidston Hill comprises 100 acres (0.40 km^{2}) of heathland and woodland maintained by Wirral Metropolitan Borough Council as a nature reserve and public park. The land was purchased in stages from 1894 to 1908 by Birkenhead Corporation from local landowner Lord Vyner. It is the site of Bidston Windmill, built around 1800 and Bidston Observatory, owned by the Natural Environment Research Council.

Adjacent to Bidston Hill is Tam O'Shanter Cottage, which is believed to have been built about 300 years ago. Its name derives from a stone carving of the poem Tam O'Shanter by Robert Burns, which adorns a wall on the site. In 1950, the building was recognised as having special historical interest for preservation. Despite two fires and threats of demolition in 1954 and 1975, the cottage was rebuilt and restored in the mid-1970s. Four acres around the cottage were developed as a city farm in 1986, known as the Tam O'Shanter Urban Farm.

Opposite the cottage is Flaybrick Memorial Gardens, Birkenhead's first municipal cemetery. The grounds encompass an arboretum and nature trails.

Bidston Moss was originally low-lying wetland marsh at the head of Wallasey Pool. In 1936 most of the land was given over to residential, commercial and industrial landfill. Since the cessation of waste disposal operations in 1995, Merseyside Waste Disposal Authority and the charitable trust Groundwork Wirral have undertaken environmental restoration works to landscape the site. The former landfill sites are now part of a nature reserve, which has several sections surrounding Bidston Moss Retail Park and Junction 1 of the M53.

Bidston Village has won title of Best Small Village several times at the Northwest In Bloom awards.

=== Sport ===
Bidston Golf Club and 18-hole golf course, opened in 1913, is situated to the north of the village, on the opposite side of the M53 and railway station. The Wirral Tennis and Leisure Centre, operated by the local council and located on Valley Road, offers six indoor and two outdoor tennis courts, a sports hall, a fitness suite and five-a-side football pitches.

== Transport ==
=== Road ===
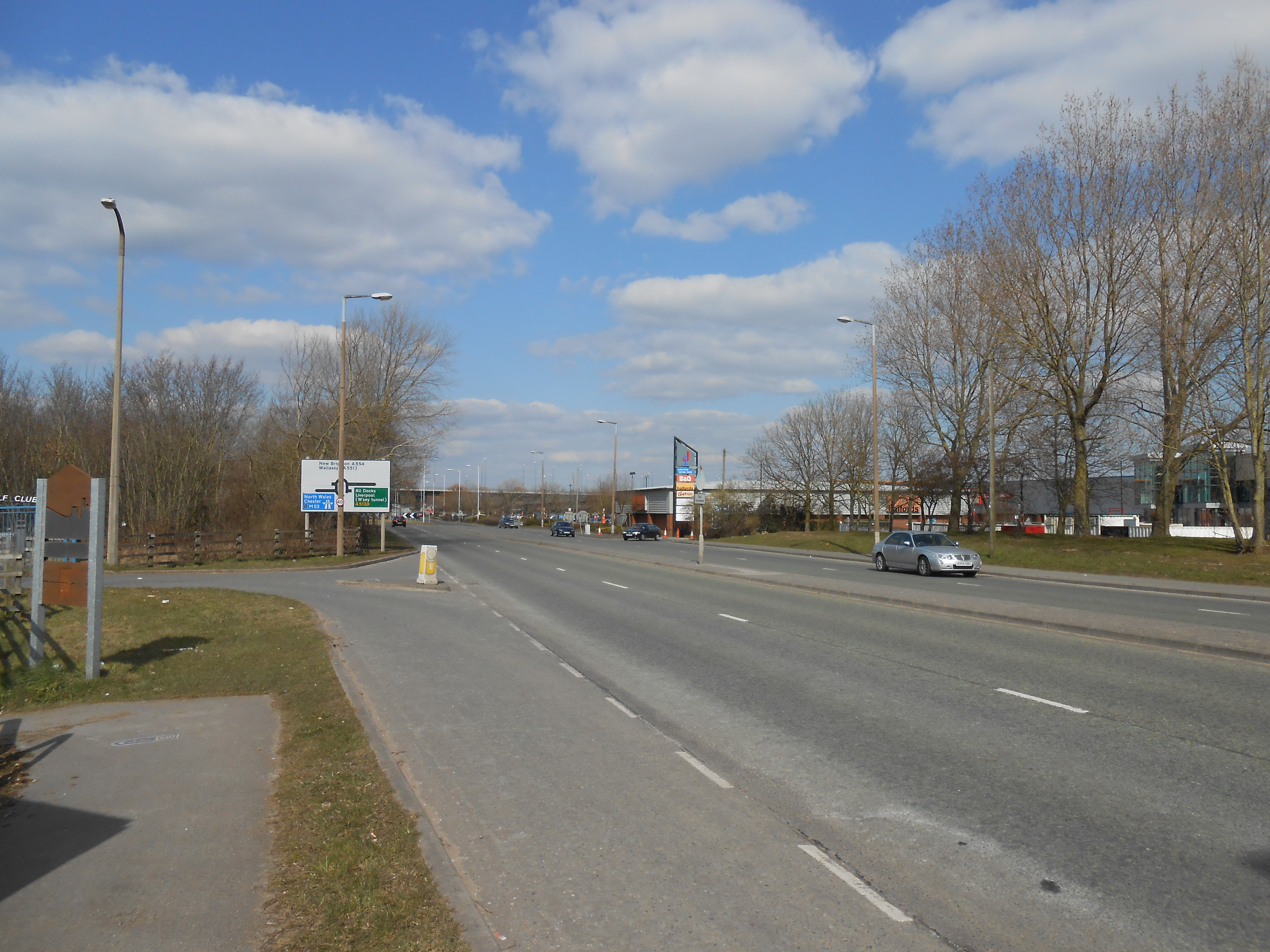
The A554 Bidston Link Road at Bidston Moss, looking towards Junction 1 of the M53. The lane on the left leads to Bidston Golf Club. Bidston Moss Retail Park is on the opposite side of the road.

The village is nearest to the northern end of the B5151 road. The retail park is situated on the A554 and also adjacent to Junction 1 of the M53 motorway. The A553 Bidston bypass separates the village from the railway station, and the retail park, to the north. This dual carriageway allows quicker road travel between Birkenhead and Moreton. The former route, through the centre of the village, is now cut off at the western end by the M53.

=== Rail ===
The locality is served by Bidston railway station. Trains operate to Liverpool and West Kirby on the Wirral Line of the Merseyrail network and to Wrexham on the Borderlands Line. Birkenhead North railway station is also a short distance away from the locality.

=== Cycling ===
National Cycle Route 56 passes through the centre of the village, along Bidston Village Road and School Lane. The route continues alongside the A554 and turns off before Bidston Moss Retail Park, travelling between the retail park and the nature reserve and then beneath the M53 motorway. This route goes from Chester to Liverpool via Leasowe and Seacombe and includes part of the Wirral Way, along its course.

== Notable people ==
- Lewis Collins, English actor, born in Bidston
- Elsie Kelly, English actress, lives in Bidston
- Harry B. Neilson, illustrator, lived at Meadowbank, 36 School Lane, Bidston

== See also ==
- Listed buildings in Bidston

== Bibliography ==
- Mortimer, William Williams (1847). The History of the Hundred of Wirral. London: Whittaker & Co. pp201-205.
- Pevsner, Nikolaus; Hubbard, Edward (1971). Cheshire. The Buildings of England. Penguin. pp. 95–97. ISBN 9780140710427. OCLC 521341.
