= St Oswald's Church, Bidston =

Coordinates: 53.4042°N 3.0793°W

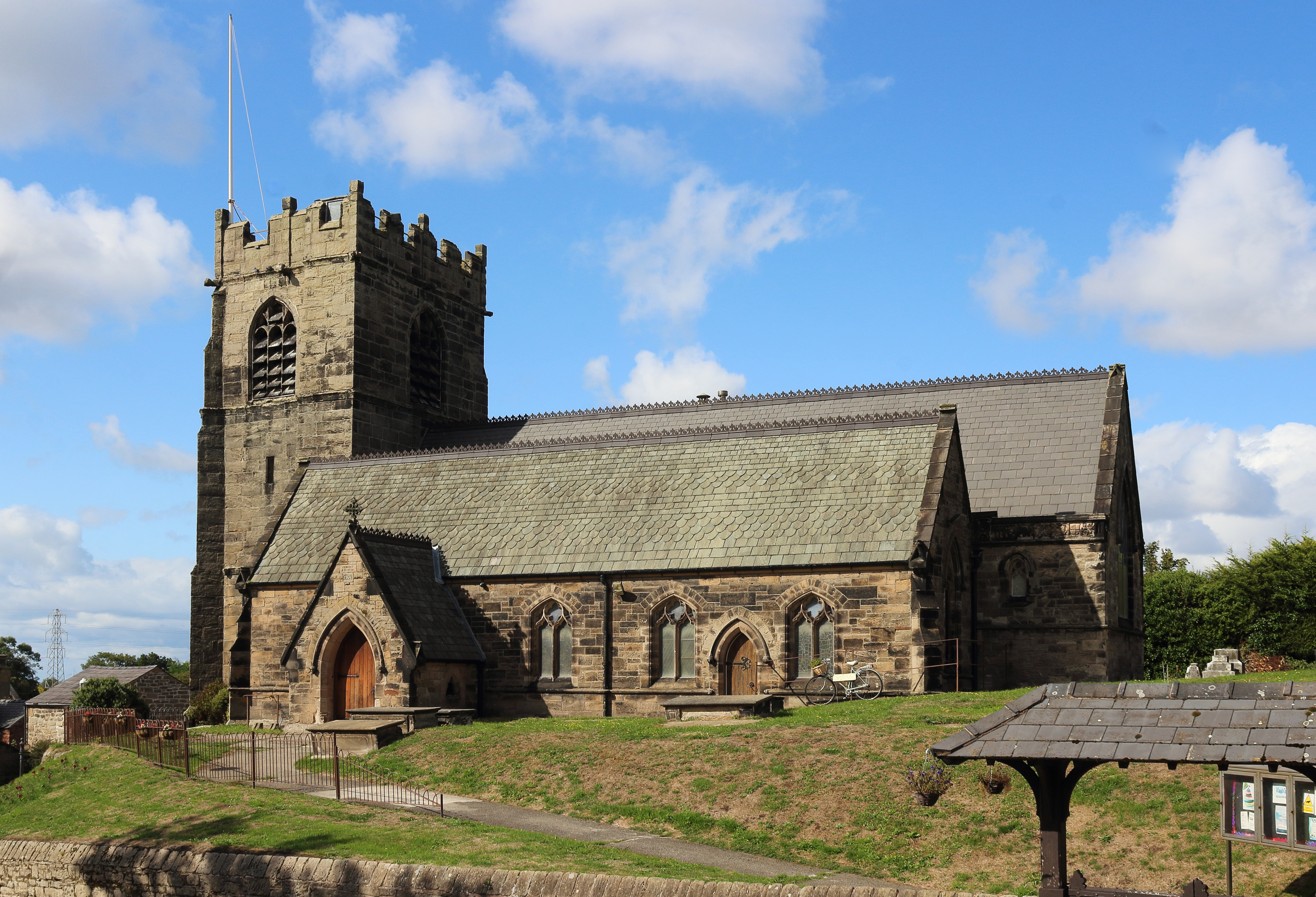
- St Oswald's Church, Bidston, from the south

- Location in Merseyside
- OS grid reference: SJ 283 903
- Location: Bidston, Birkenhead, Wirral, Merseyside
- Country: England
- Denomination: Anglican
- Churchmanship: Evangelical
- Website: St Oswald's, Bidston

History
- Status: Parish church

Architecture
- Functional status: Active
- Heritage designation: Grade II
- Designated: 29 July 1950
- Architect(s): W. & J. Hay, G. E. Grayson
- Architectural type: Church
- Style: Gothic, Gothic Revival
- Completed: 1882

Specifications
- Materials: Coursed and squared rubble Westmorland slate roof with ridge cresting

Administration
- Province: York
- Diocese: Chester
- Archdeaconry: Chester
- Deanery: Birkenhead
- Parish: Bidston

Clergy
- Vicar: Revd Joe Smith

St Oswald's Church is in Bidston, an area of Birkenhead, Wirral, Merseyside, England. It is recorded in the National Heritage List for England as a designated Grade II listed building. It is an active Anglican parish church in the diocese of Chester, the archdeaconry of Chester and the deanery of Birkenhead.

== History ==
The original church dates back to the 13th century. The tower was built in 1520. The rest of the church was rebuilt in 1855–56 by W. and J. Hay in Gothic Revival style. An extension was made to the chancel in 1882 by G. E. Grayson.

== Architecture ==
=== Exterior ===
The church is built from coursed and squared rubble in large blocks with a roof of Westmorland slate with ridge cresting. Its plan consists of a west tower, a nave, north and south aisles with gable roofs, a south porch, and a chancel. Heraldic shields over the west door date it between 1504 and 1521. The tower is in three stages with angle buttresses and an embattled parapet.

=== Interior ===
In the chancel is a sedilia dated 1882. The reredos is a mosaic depicting The Last Supper by Salviati over which is a wooden canopy frieze. The stained glass includes windows by Morris & Co., Robert Anning Bell, H. Gustave Hiller, H. Hughes, Powell and Frank O. Salisbury. The two-manual organ dating from 1929 is by Henry Willis & Sons. There is a ring of six bells by Robert Stainbank of the Whitechapel Bell Foundry, five of which are dated 1868 and the other 1882. The parish registers begin in 1679 and the churchwardens' accounts in 1767.

== External features ==
The churchyard contains four war graves, each of which represents a different service; a British Army Colonel of World War I, and a Royal Air Force officer, a Royal Navy and a Merchant Navy sailor of World War II.

== See also ==
- Listed buildings in Bidston
- List of works by Grayson and Ould
