= Bidston Windmill =

Windmill in Wirral, England

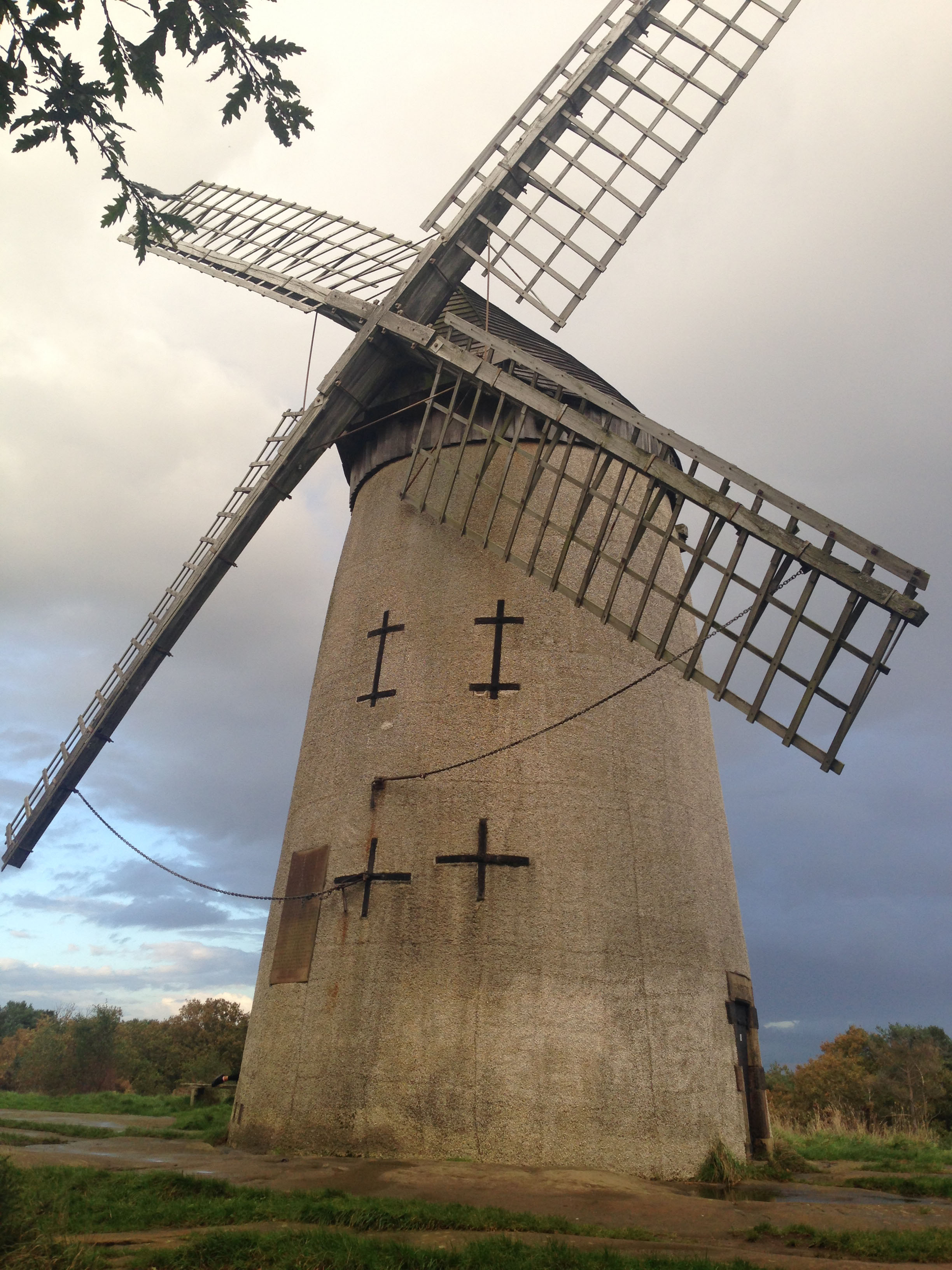
- The mill in 2013

Origin
- Mill name: Bidston Mill
- Grid reference: SJ 287 893
- Coordinates: 53.397°N 3.074°W
- Operator(s): Public
- Year built: c. 1800

Information
- Purpose: Corn mill
- Type: Tower mill
- No. of sails: 4
Listed Building – Grade II*
Official name	Bidston Windmill
Designated	29 July 1950
Reference no.	1282506

Bidston Windmill is a historic corn mill situated on Bidston Hill near Birkenhead, on the Wirral Peninsula in England.

== History ==
It is believed that there has been a windmill on this site since 1596. The mill was ideally placed to catch the wind and was able to produce over 100 pounds (45 kg) of flour every 3 to 5 minutes. However, the mill was difficult to access by cart. The previous structure, a wooden peg mill, was destroyed by fire in 1791 (although some sources state 1793). During a gale, the sails got out of control and the friction produced by the revolving wooden mechanism caused the entire mill to burst into flames.

The current building was built around 1800 and continued working as a flour mill until about 1875. After falling into disuse, the windmill and the land on which it stands was purchased by Birkenhead Corporation and restored from 1894.

There is a plaque on the windmill, which reads as follows:

This land, including the woods surrounding this windmill, containing with the adjacent piece of land known as Thermopylae about 90 acres (360,000 m^{2}) was purchased from RG de Grey Vyner during the years 1894 to 1908 at a cost of £30,310. Of this sum the Corporation of Birkenhead contributed £14,625 and £15,685 was raised by public subscription. A portion of this land, viz the eastern wood containing 22 acres (89,000 m^{2}), was purchased as a memorial of the late Edmund Taylor, of Oxton, in recognition of his great services in connection with the acquisition of Bidston Hill for the benefit of the public. The land belongs to and is maintained at the expense of the Corporation of Birkenhead. But according to the deeds of conveyance it must always be used as an open space and place of public recreation and must be preserved and maintained, so far as possible, in its present wild and natural condition. Special care being given to preservation of the trees, gorse, heath and also of this windmill. Bye laws have been made and a keeper and assistant appointed so that they are observed. The public, for whose enjoyment alone the land was secured, are invited to aid in preserving it from fire and damage.

— AD MCMIX. This tablet restored 1971.

The building was badly damaged in 1927, once again. A public subscription was then raised, in order to carry out the necessary repairs. The windmill has been reconditioned several times since and it was Grade II* listed in 1950. During 2006, the roof of the windmill was replaced as part of a refurbishment programme, in order to maintain the structure.

== See also ==
- Grade II* listed buildings in Merseyside
- Listed buildings in Bidston
