= Beechwood railway station =

Proposed railway station in Wirral, England

Coordinates: 53.3977°N 3.0855°W

Beechwood

General information
- Location: Merseyside, Wirral; England
- Grid reference: SJ279895
Location

Beechwood is a proposed railway station situated between Bidston and Upton on the Borderlands Line, to serve the Beechwood area of Birkenhead.

According to the Core Strategy for Wirral report, compiled by the local council, Beechwood railway station is one of the council's long-term objectives. This was mentioned in Merseytravel's 30-year plan of 2014. The October 2017 Liverpool City Region Combined Authority update to the Long Term Rail Strategy mentions the station as being built between Network Rail Control Periods CP5 and CP7.

The land for the station has been reserved by the Metropolitan Borough of Wirral's local planning authority, which considers the station to be justified by the size of the catchment population.

Preceding station	Future services	Following station
Upton	Transport for Wales Borderlands Line	Bidston
