= Leasowe Lighthouse =

Disused lighthouse in Leasowe, Wirral, England

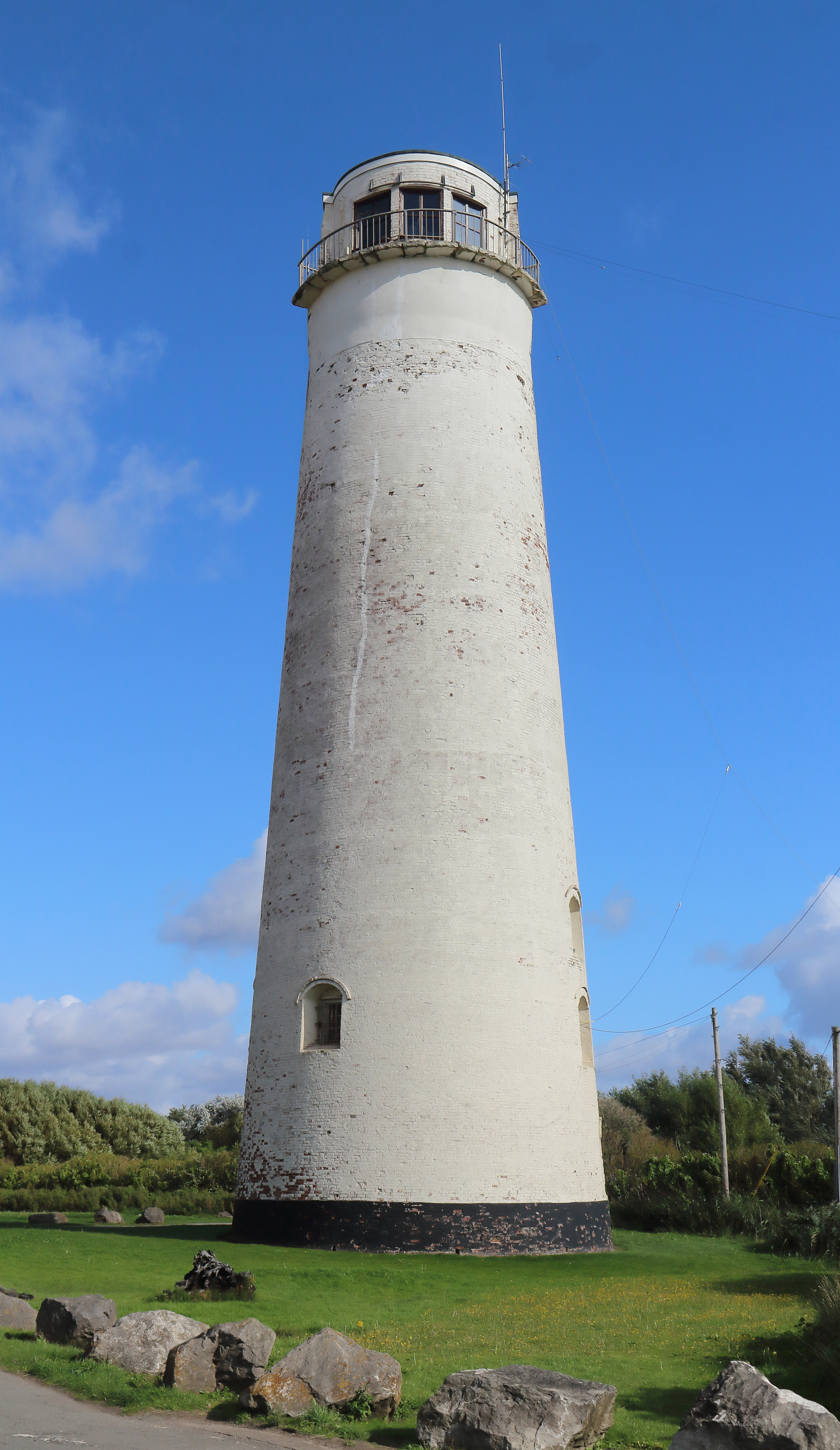
- Location: Wirral Peninsula, Moreton, Metropolitan Borough of Wirral, United Kingdom
- OS grid: SJ2526891296
- Coordinates: 53°24′47″N 3°07′33″W

Tower
- Constructed: 1763
- Construction: brick
- Height: 33.5 m (110 ft)
- Shape: Cylindrical tower with balcony and removed lantern
- Markings: White
- Operator: Mersey Docks and Harbour Company (–1908)
- Heritage: Grade II listed building

Light
- Deactivated: 1908

Leasowe Lighthouse is an historic lighthouse in Moreton on the Wirral Peninsula in Merseyside, England. The lighthouse was built in 1763 by The Mersey Docks and Harbour Company to guide shipping safely to the Port of Liverpool and is the oldest lighthouse built from bricks in the United Kingdom. The lighthouse became obsolete and was closed in 1908. The last lighthouse keeper was a Mrs. Williams, the only known female lighthouse keeper of the period.

== History ==
An Act of Parliament passed in 1761 allowed the Liverpool Docks Trustees to build four lighthouses. Two were built at Moreton. These were the Upper Mockbeggar Light and Lower Mockbeggar Light. When lined up, these allowed for safe passage through "Rock Channel" to the Port of Liverpool. The former is now known as Leasowe Lighthouse, while the latter was built one quarter of a mile into the sea and was destroyed by a storm in 1769, with its replacement, Bidston Lighthouse, built in 1771 on Bidston Hill. The other two lighthouses permitted by the Act were built at Hoylake (the name Hoylake was derived from Hoyle Lake, the name of a channel of water between Hilbre Island and Dove Point, Meols) to facilitate safe access into the Hoyle Lake anchorage. Protected by a wide sandbank known as Hoyle Bank and with a water depth of about 20 feet, it provided a safe anchorage for ships.

Leasowe Lighthouse was in use until 14 July 1908; by this time, the sand banks had shifted so much that Rock Channel was barely navigable, rendering the lighthouse obsolete. The lighthouse was a place of work and also a home. The last lighthouse keeper was a Mrs. Williams, the only known female lighthouse keeper in this period. Upon its closure as a lighthouse, Williams moved into a cottage but kept the lighthouse open as a tearoom during the summer months. In 1930, the lighthouse was bought by the Wallasey Corporation, in 1935 Williams died and the building was closed. The lighthouse was listed as a historic Grade II building with Historic England in 1952. A period of disrepair ensued and the lighthouse became derelict. It was then restored by a community group called "The Friends of Leasowe Lighthouse".

== Construction ==
The lighthouse is a tapering cylindrical design that is one hundred and one feet tall with cavity walls that are several feet thick and a plain balcony. The construction used 660,000 hand-made bricks. It has seven floors. The original wooden staircase was replaced in 1898, with one made of cast iron that has one hundred and thirty steps. The light was originally coal-fired, but in 1772 changed to oil burning. Robert Stevenson said in 1801, while on his lighthouse tour, that the tower had "one reflector of silvered glass 7½ feet in diameter and 13 inches focal distance". Later, in 1861, it was reportedly equipped with eight Argand lamps and reflectors. It was staffed by a keeper and an assistant, who resided in the tower.

== Location ==
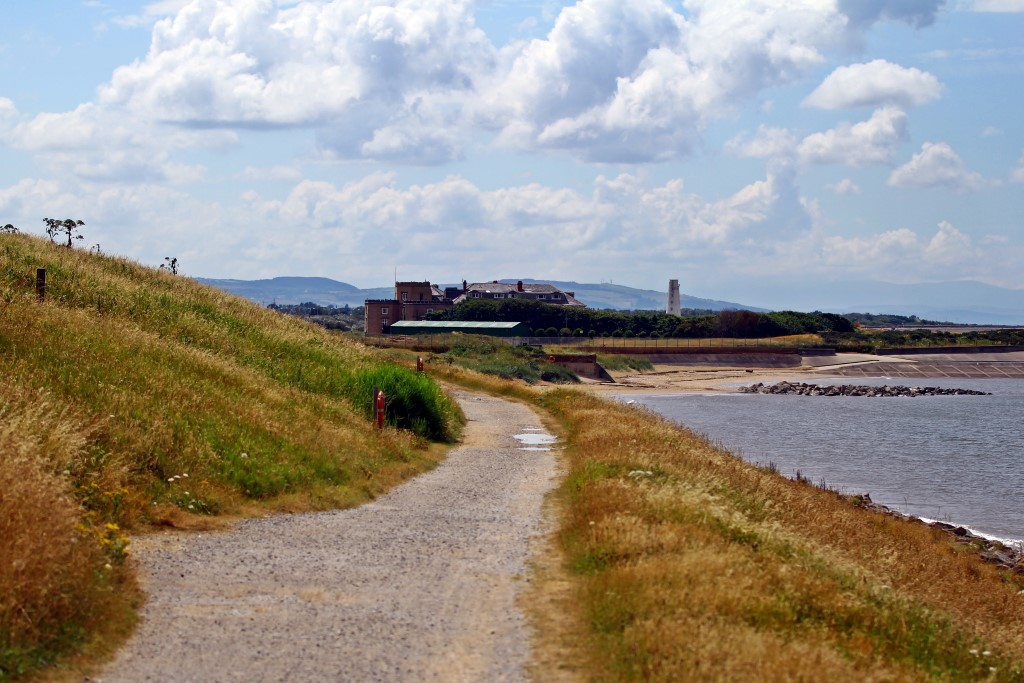
The footpath at Mockbeggar Wharf approaching Leasowe Lighthouse

The lighthouse is on Moreton Common near Mockbeggar Wharf. The Wharf takes its name from Mockbeggar Hall, which is an alternative name for the nearby Leasowe Castle. The area is in the North Wirral Coastal Park and used for recreational purposes such as walking and bird watching.

== Facilities ==
The lighthouse is a community facility that is used as a location for numerous activities and is used by the ranger service of the North Wirral Coastal Park. It is used for charity abseiling events and paranormal visits, as well as for a meeting place for running groups. It has also been used by film and television companies. The lighthouse has a small visitor centre and is a focal location on the North Wirral Coastal Park. It is open on the first and third Sunday of every month for visits.
