= Listed buildings in Bidston =

Bidston is a suburb of Birkenhead, Wirral, Merseyside, England. It contains 23 buildings that are recorded in the National Heritage List for England as designated listed buildings. Of these, three are listed at Grade II*, the middle of the three grades, and the others are at Grade II, the lowest grade.

Bidston originated as a village, and later became absorbed by the growth of Birkenhead. The centre of the village retains older buildings, including four farmhouses and associated farm buildings that are all listed. Also listed is Bidston Hall and associated structures. In addition the list includes almshouses, and two churches, one in the village, and one in the outskirts of the suburb. To the east of the village is Bidston Hill which contains four listed buildings, namely an observatory, a lighthouse and cottages, the wall surrounding them, and a windmill.

== Key ==
Grade	Criteria
II*	Particularly important buildings of more than special interest
II	Buildings of national importance and special interest

== Buildings ==
Name and location	Photograph	Date	Notes	Grade
Church Farmhouse; 53.40391°N 3.08001°W		Early 16th century	The left wing is the oldest part, it has a cruck frame, and is encased in stone. The main range was added in the 17th century, and another wing in the 19th century; these are in stone, and all have slate roofs. The house is in three storeys with an attic. The windows are mullioned, and are irregularly placed. On the front is a gabled porch.	II
St Oswald's Church; 53.40420°N 3.07927°W		Early 16th century	The earliest part of the church is the tower. The rest of the church was rebuilt in 1855–56 by W. and J. Hay in Gothic Revival style, and the chancel was extended in 1882 by G. E. Grayson. The church is in stone with a roof of Westmorland slate, and consists of a nave with aisles, a chancel, and a west tower. The tower is in three stages, and has an embattled parapet.	II
Bidston Hall; 53.40382°N 3.07625°W		c. 1590	Originally built as a hunting lodge for the 4th Earl of Derby it was enlarged in the 1620s. The hall is in stone with slate roofs, with two storeys. It is symmetrical with a central bowed two-storey porch and a scalloped parapet on the entrance front. At the rear is a four-bay loggia with an arcade of semicircular arches. The windows are mullioned.	II*
Gateway and wall, Bidston Hall; 53.40382°N 3.07673°W		Late 16th century	The wall and gateway are in stone. The wall stands on a plinth, it encloses the forecourt, and has segmental coping. It rises over the segmental archway, which has pendent voussoirs and three domed finials.	II*
Rear garden wall, Bidston Hall; 53.40382°N 3.07553°W		Late 16th century (probable)	The wall surrounds the rear garden of the hall. It stands on a plinth, and has segmental coping. In the angles are the remains of former summer houses. In the centre of the rear wall is a shallow arched gateway.	II
Stable range, Yew Tree Farm; 53.40370°N 3.07835°W		Early 17th century (possible)	The building has a basic cruck construction, encased in stone, and with a Welsh slate roof. Originally in two bays, a third bay was added later. It contains doorways with loft openings above, and there are pig sties against the west gable.	II
The Lilacs; 53.40408°N 3.07870°W		17th century	A farmhouse, later divided into separate dwellings. It is in sandstone with a Welsh slate roof, and has two storeys. The plan consists of a main range with two gabled cross-wings. Most of the windows are mullioned, and there is a sash window. On the front is a gabled porch, and on the left side is a massive chimney stack.	II
Yew Tree Farmhouse; 53.40367°N 3.07797°W		1697	A timber-framed farmhouse with an attached farm. The farmhouse is encased in stone and has a slate roof. It has two storeys and three bays. On the front is a gabled porch with a datestone above, and the windows are mullioned. The barn has four bays. There are crucks inside both the farmhouse and the barn.	II
Outbuilding, The Lilacs; 53.40423°N 3.07856°W		Late 17th to early 18th century	Originally a barn and stables, it has been converted into dwellings. The building is in stone with a Welsh slate roof. Windows have been inserted.	II
Barn, Church Farm; 53.40409°N 3.08028°W		Early 18th century	The barn is in stone. On the right side are double doors, with two bays to the left. In the north gable is a doorway with a lintel.	II
Granary, Church Farm; 53.40381°N 3.08032°W		Early 18th century	A granary, cart shed and pig sties in stone with a Welsh slate roof. The granary is in two storeys, with a double doorway, a loft window, an external staircase, and a dog kennel, To the right is a single-storey cart shed with three open bays. At the rear are two pig sties.	II
2 and 4 School Lane; 53.40446°N 3.07927°W		18th century (probable)	A pair of cottages, partly in stone and partly in brick, with a Welsh slate roof. They are mainly in two storeys, and have an L-shaped plan. The range facing the road has casement windows, and the projecting wing to the left has casement and sash windows. To the rear of this wing is a three-storey block.	II
Byre, Church Farm; 53.40395°N 3.08057°W		18th century	A byre and stables in stone with a Welsh slate roof. They are in two storeys, forming two ranges at right angles, with fronts of five and three bays. They contain doorways, windows, upper-floor taking-in openings, and ventilation slots.	II
Stone Farmhouse; 53.40418°N 3.07982°W		18th century	The farmhouse contains earlier material. It is in stone with a Welsh slate roof, and has two storeys and two bays. Some windows are casements, other are horizontally-sliding sashes, and the entrance is in the gable end.	II
Bidston Windmill; 53.39628°N 3.07330°W		Late 18th century	The windmill was restored in 1894, and again in 1971. It consists of a circular tapering roughcast tower with a boarded cap and four sails. The windmill has a door with a lintel inscribed with the date 1894.	II*
Farm building, Bidston Hall Farm; 53.40335°N 3.07736°W		Late 18th century	The building is in stone with Welsh slate roofs, and has an L-shaped plan. The main range contains nine stables, each with a doorway and window in an architrave and a lost opening above. The other range was a stable or byre, and has two doors and windows.	II
Ivy Farmhouse; 53.40377°N 3.07926°W	—	Late 18th to early 19th century	The farmhouse has been divided into two dwellings. It is in brick with some stone work and Welsh slate roofs, and is in two blocks. The older block is in two storeys with steps leading up to a central doorway, and it has sash windows. To the right is a single-storey block with casement windows.	II
Wall, observatory and lighthouse 53.40093°N 3.07455°W		1866	The stone wall extends around the perimeter of the grounds of Bidston Observatory and Bidston Lighthouse. On the west side is a gateway consisting of a chamfered segmental arch with imposts, a coped gable, and a finial.	II
Bidston Observatory; 53.40063°N 3.07421°W		1866	The former observatory was later used as a laboratory. It is in stone with slate roofs, and is in two storeys throughout. At the south end are two octagonal towers with domed tops to house telescopes. Behind these were a library and a chart room, and beyond these, the director's house. The entrance is on the four-bay west front. There are five bays on the north front, and the windows are sashes.	II
Bidston Lighthouse and cottages 53.40110°N 3.07427°W		1873	The lighthouse is in stone and consists of a three-stage tower on which is a recessed light chamber. The light chamber has a conical metal roof with a roundel finial. The two stone cottages are in a single storey and form a linear range. They have hipped Welsh slate roofs. All the windows are sashes.	II
Clover Almshouses; 53.40443°N 3.08039°W		1901	A pair of almshouses by Woodfall and Eccles in stone with a stone flagged roof. They are in a single storey, the central bay projecting forward under a semicircular gable containing a coat of arms and an inscription. The recessed doorways are in the outer bays, and the windows are mullioned.	II
Holy Cross Church; 53.40245°N 3.06717°W		1957–59	A Roman Catholic church, no longer in use, by F. X. Velarde. It is in brick and stone with tiled roofs. It has a nave with aisles, and a chancel with a curved apse and a Lady Chapel. At the entrance is a narthex with pinnacles, a baptistry, and a tower. The tower is square, with round-headed openings in the bell stage, and a pyramidal copper roof.	II
Entwood; 53.39121°N 3.07801°W	—	1959	A private house by Dewi Prys Thomas in stuccoed brick with concrete tiled roofs. It consists of groups of pavilions with a pinwheel plan. The part facing the garden has an L-shape, and contains a double-height room.	II
