= Wirral Peninsula =

Peninsula in North West England

Wirral
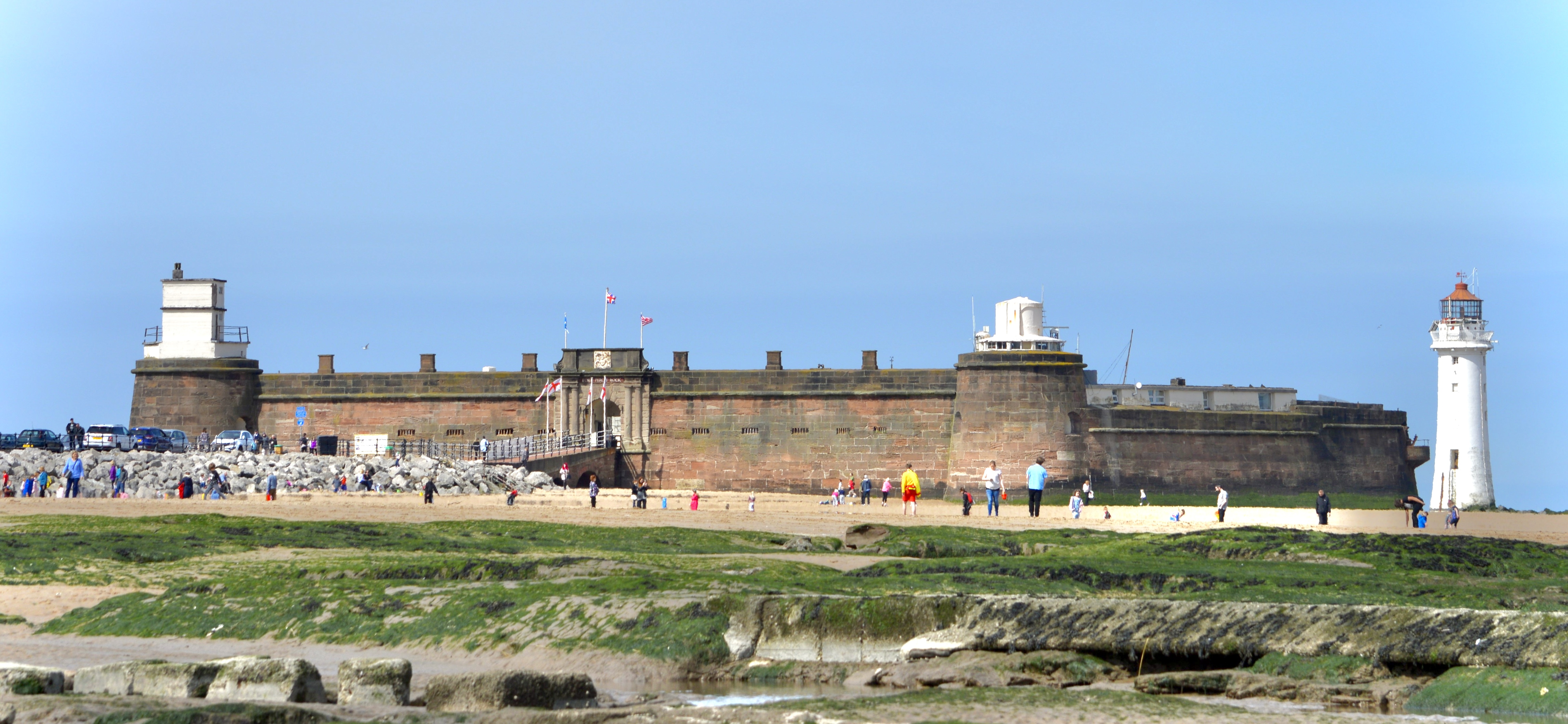
- Fort Perch Rock

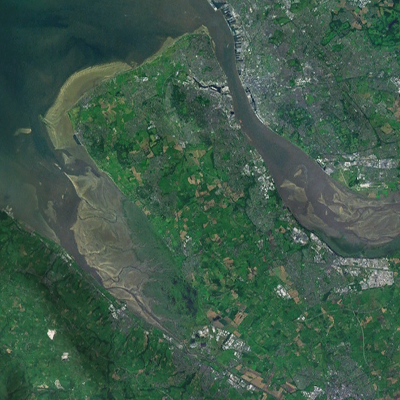
- Satellite image of the Wirral

- Location within Northern England

Geography
- Location: Northwest England
- Coordinates: 53°22′N 3°05′W
- OS grid reference: SJ285850
- Adjacent to: Irish Sea (Liverpool Bay) • Dee Estuary • Mersey Estuary

Administration
- United Kingdom
- Country: England
- Region: North West England
- Ceremonial county: Merseyside • Cheshire
- Boroughs: Wirral • Cheshire West and Chester (part)

The Wirral Peninsula (/ˈwɪrəl/), known locally as the Wirral, is a peninsula in North West England. The roughly rectangular peninsula is about 15 miles (24 km) long and 7 miles (11 km) wide, and is bounded by the Dee Estuary to the west, the Mersey Estuary to the east and Liverpool Bay to the north.

Historically, the Wirral was wholly in Cheshire; in the Domesday Book, its border with the rest of the county was placed at "two arrow falls from Chester city walls". However, since the Local Government Act 1972, only the southern third of the peninsula remains in Cheshire, in the unitary authority of Cheshire West and Chester. The remainder forms the Metropolitan Borough of Wirral, in the county of Merseyside. An area of saltmarsh and reclaimed land adjoining the south-west of the peninsula lies in the Welsh county of Flintshire.

== Toponymy ==
The name Wirral literally means "myrtle corner", from the Old English wir, a myrtle tree, and heal, an angle, corner or slope. It is supposed that the land was once overgrown with bog myrtle, a plant no longer found in the area, but plentiful around Formby, to which the Wirral would once have had a similar habitat. The name was given to the Hundred of Wirral (or Wilaveston) around the 8th century.

== History ==
=== Prehistoric settlement ===
The earliest evidence of human occupation of the Wirral dates from the Mesolithic period, around 12,000 BC. Excavations at Greasby have uncovered flint tools, signs of stake holes and a hearth used by a hunter-gatherer community. Other evidence from about the same period has been found at Irby, Hoylake and New Brighton. Later Neolithic stone axes and pottery have been found in Oxton, Neston, and Meols. At Meols and New Brighton there is evidence of occupation through to the Bronze Age, around 1000 BC, and funerary urns of the period have been found at West Kirby and Hilbre.

Before the time of the Romans, the Wirral was inhabited by a Celtic tribe, the Cornovii. Artefacts discovered in Meols suggest it was an important port from at least 500 BC. Traders came from Gaul and the Mediterranean localities to seek minerals from North Wales and Cheshire. There are remains of a small Iron Age fort at Burton, for which the town was named (burh tūn being Old English for "fort town").

=== The Romans and Britons ===
Around AD 70, the Romans founded Chester. Evidence of their occupation on the Wirral has been found, including the remains of a road near Prenton (suitably named Roman Road), Mollington, Ledsham and Willaston. This road may have continued to the port at Meols, which may have been used as a base for attacking the north Wales coast. Storeton Quarry may also have been used by Romans for materials for sculpture. Remains of possible Roman roads have also been found at Greasby and at Bidston. By the end of the Roman period, pirates were a menace to traders in the Irish Sea, and soldiers may have been garrisoned at Meols to combat this threat.

Although Roman rule ended with the departure of the last Roman troops in 410, later coins and other material found at Meols show that it continued to operate as a trading port. Evidence of Celtic Christianity from the 5th or 6th centuries is shown in the originally circular shape of churchyards at Bromborough, Woodchurch and elsewhere, and also in the dedication of the parish church at Wallasey to a 4th-century bishop, Hilary of Poitiers. The Celtic names of Liscard and Landican (from Llandecwyn) both suggest an ancient British origin. The name of Wallasey, meaning "Welsh (or foreigners') island", is evidence of British settlement. The Welsh name, both ancient and modern, for the Wirral is Cilgwri. In Welsh mythology, the ouzel (or blackbird) of Cilgwri was one of the most ancient creatures in the world.

=== English and Norse ===
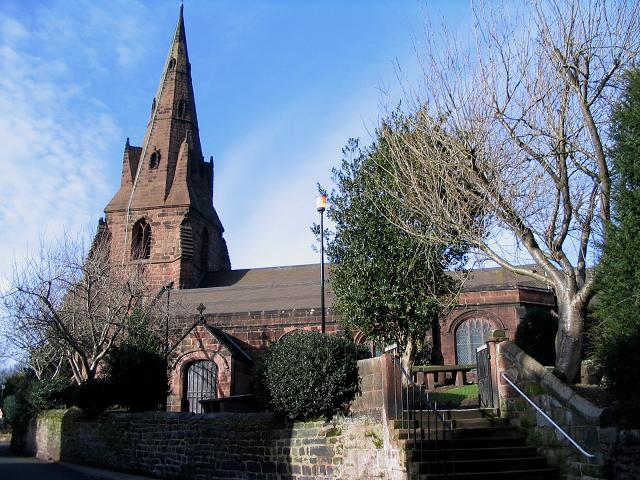
St. Mary's Church, Eastham

The Anglo-Saxons under Æthelfrith, king of Northumbria, laid waste to Chester around 616. Æthelfrith withdrew, leaving the area west and south of the Mersey to become part of Mercia, and Anglo-Saxon settlers took over the Wirral except the northern tip. Many of the Wirral's villages, such as Willaston, Eastham and Sutton, were established and named at this time.

Towards the end of the 9th century, Vikings began raiding the area. They settled along the Dee side of the peninsula, and along the sea coast, giving their villages names such as Kirby, Greasby and Meols. They introduced their own local government system with a parliament at Thingwall. The pseudo-historical Fragmentary Annals of Ireland appears to record the Hiberno-Scandinavian settlement of the Wirral peninsula in its account of the immigration of Ingimundr near Chester. This Irish source places this settlement in the aftermath of the Vikings' expulsion from Dublin in 902, and an unsuccessful attempt to settle on Anglesey soon afterwards. Following these setbacks, Ingimundr is stated to have settled near Chester with the consent of Æthelflæd, co-ruler of Mercia. The boundary of the Viking colony is believed to have passed south of Neston and Raby, and along Dibbinsdale. Evidence of Norse speech on the Wirral can still be seen from place name evidence – such as the common -by (meaning "village" in Scandinavian languages) – suffixes and names such as Tranmere, which comes from trani melr ("cranebird sandbank"). Viking Age sculpture corroborates this. Recent Y-DNA research has also revealed the genetic trail left by Scandinavians on the Wirral, specifically relatively high rates of the haplogroup R1a, associated in Britain with Scandinavian ancestry.

Bromborough on the Wirral is also one of the possible sites of an epic battle in 937, the Battle of Brunanburh, which confirmed England as an Anglo-Saxon kingdom. This is the first battle where England united to fight the combined forces of the Norsemen and the Scots, and thus historians consider it the birthplace of England. The battle site covered a large area of the Wirral. Egil's Saga, a story which tells of the battle, may have referred to the Wirral as Wen Heath, Vínheíþr in Icelandic.

=== The Normans and the early Middle Ages ===
After invading England in 1066 and subduing Northumbria in 1069–1070, William the Conqueror invaded and ravaged Chester and its surrounding area, laying waste to much of the Wirral. The Domesday survey of 1086 shows that the Wirral then was more densely populated than most of England, and the manor of Eastham, which covered most of the east of the peninsula from Bidston to the River Gowy, was the second largest in Cheshire. Of the 28 former lords of the Wirral manors listed, 12 bore Norse names. By 1086, most of the area was in the hands of Norman lords such as Robert of Rhuddlan, his cousin Hugh d'Avranches, and Hamo de Mascy. The survey shows 405 family heads living in the peninsula, suggesting a total population of 2,000–3,000.

The Earls of Chester ruled the whole of the County Palatine, including the Wirral, almost as "a kingdom within a kingdom" for about 250 years. Between 1120 and 1123, Earl Ranulph le Meschin made several edicts that converted the Wirral into a hunting forest. This made the area subject to Forest Law which made the hunting of game, such as deer and boar, by unauthorised persons subject to harsh penalties. To enforce the forest laws was a chief forester who was appointed with a ceremonial horn, and the position soon became a hereditary responsibility of the Stanley family. However, after complaints from minor Wirral landowners about the wildness of the area and oppression by the Stanleys, Edward the Black Prince as Earl of Chester agreed to a charter confirming the disafforestation of the Wirral, shortly before his death from amoebic dysentery. The proclamation was issued by his father Edward III on 20 July 1376.

At the end of the 12th century, Birkenhead Priory stood on the west bank of the Mersey at a headland of birch trees, from which the town derives its name. The ruined priory is Merseyside's oldest surviving building and its Benedictine monks provided the first official Mersey ferry service around 1330, having been granted a passage to Liverpool by a charter from Edward III. At this time, large areas of Wirral were owned by Chester Abbey. In 1278 the Abbey was granted the right to hold an annual three-day fair at Bromborough, but the fair declined after the Black Death in 1349. Another fair was established in 1299 at Burton. Meanwhile, Meols continued as an important port, and the eroded coastline there has provided what is described as "the largest collection of medieval domestic items to have come from any single site outside London".

=== 16th, 17th and 18th centuries ===
A Subsidy Roll of 1545 shows that the population of the Wirral was no more than 4,000. The peninsula was divided into 15 parishes (Wallasey, Bidston, Upton, Woodchurch, West Kirby, Thurstaston, Heswall, Bebington, Bromborough, Eastham, Neston, Burton, Shotwick, Backford and Stoke). Most parishes were subdivided into smaller townships, of which the largest in terms of population were Neston, Burton, Wallasey, Tranmere (then within the parish of Bebington) and Liscard, and were the same size as small rural villages.

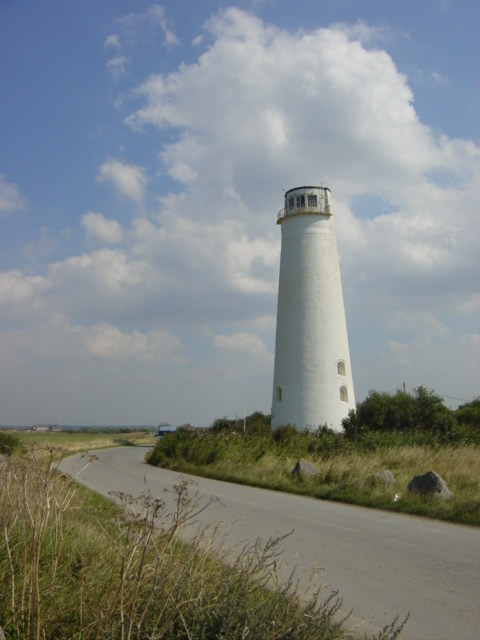
Leasowe Lighthouse, built in 1763 and the oldest brick-built lighthouse in Britain

The Wirral's proximity to the port of Chester influenced the history of the Dee side of the peninsula. From about the 14th century, Chester provided facilities for trade with Ireland, Spain, and Germany, and seagoing vessels would "lay to" in the Dee awaiting favourable winds and tides. As the Dee started to silt up, harbouring facilities developed at Shotwick, Burton, Neston, Parkgate, Dawpool, and "Hoyle Lake" or Hoylake. However, there was not a gradual progression of development, and downstream anchorages such as that at Hoyle Lake (which replaced Meols) were in occasional use from medieval times, depending on the weather and state of the tide. The main port facilities were at Neston and Parkgate.

At the same time, larger ships and economic growth in Lancashire stimulated the growth of Liverpool. The first wet dock in Britain was opened in Liverpool in 1715, and the town's population grew from some 6,000 to 80,000 during the 18th century. The need to develop and protect the port led to a chain of lighthouses being built along the north Wirral coast. The commercial expansion of Liverpool, and the increase in stage coach traffic from Chester, also spurred the growth of ferries across the River Mersey. By the end of the 18th century the Wirral side of the Mersey had five ferry houses, at Seacombe, Woodside, the Rock, New Ferry and Eastham.

Other communications were also improving. Turnpike roads linking Chester with Eastham, Woodside, and Neston were built after 1787. In 1793, work began on the Ellesmere Canal, connecting the Mersey with Chester and Shropshire through the fluvioglacial landform known as the Backford gap, and the town of Ellesmere Port began to develop.

The excavation of the New Cut of the Dee, opened in 1737, to improve access to Chester, diverted the river's course to the Welsh side of the estuary and took trade away from the Wirral coastline. Although plans were made to overcome its gradual silting up, including one in 1857 to cut a ship canal from a point between Thurstaston and Heswall to run along the length of the Wirral to Chester, this and other schemes came to nothing, and the focus of general trade moved irrevocably to the much deeper Mersey. However, from the late 18th century there was coal mining near Neston, in tunnels stretching up to two miles (three kilometres) under the Dee, and a quay at Denhall was used for coal exports.

=== 19th century ===
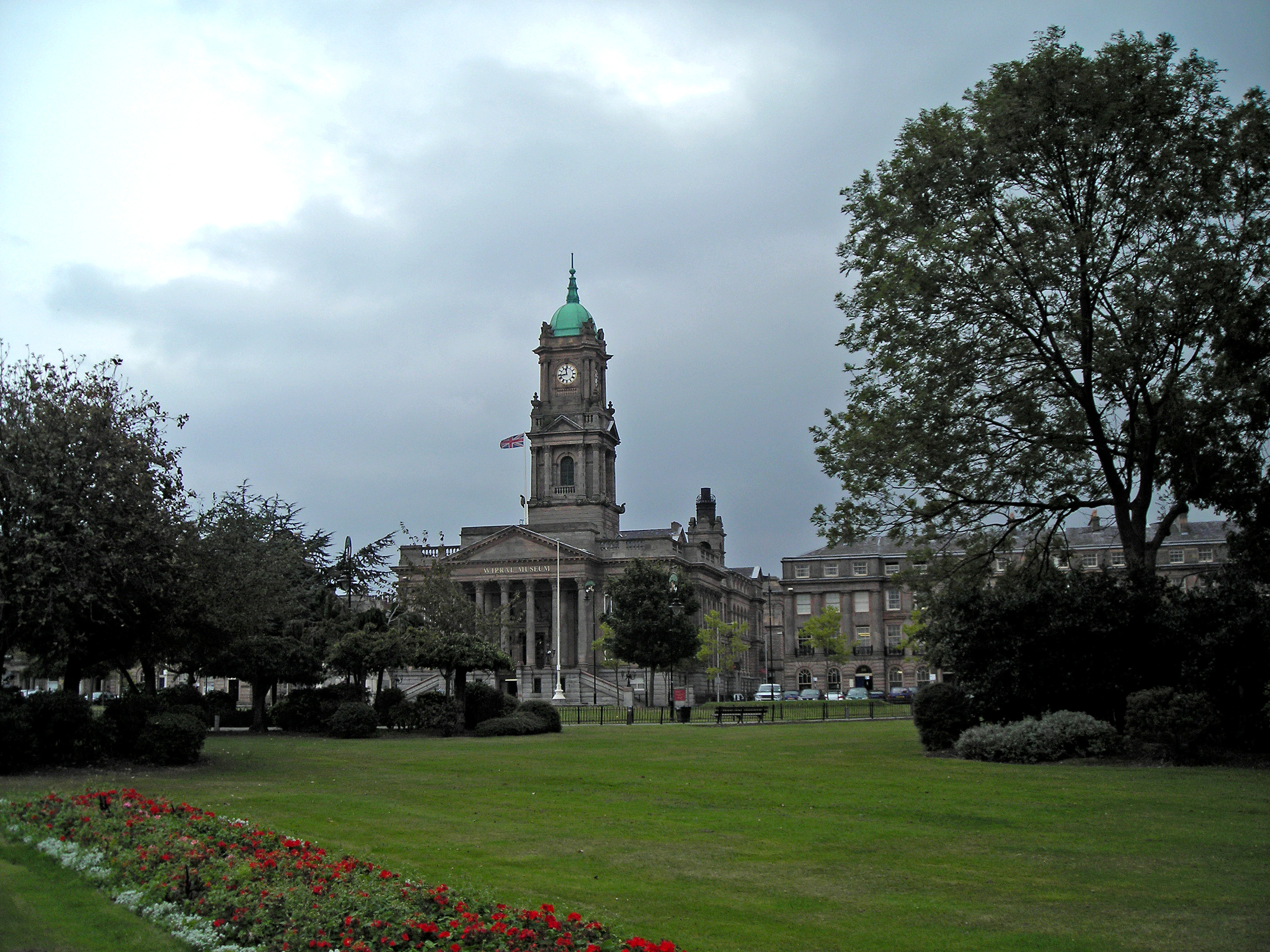
Hamilton Square, Birkenhead

The first steam ferry service across the Mersey started in 1817, and steam-powered ships soon opened up the Wirral's Mersey coast for industrialisation. The 1820s saw the birth of the area's renowned shipbuilding tradition when William Laird opened his shipyard in Birkenhead, later expanded by his son John Laird. The Lairds were largely responsible for the early growth of Birkenhead, commissioning the architect James Gillespie Graham to lay it out as a new town modelled on Edinburgh. In 1847, Birkenhead's first docks and its municipal park, the first in Britain and the inspiration for New York's Central Park, were opened, and the town expanded rapidly. Bolstered by migration from Ireland, Wales and rural Cheshire, Birkenhead's population of less than one thousand in 1801 rose to over 33,000 by 1851, and to 157,000 by 1901. The town became a borough in 1877, incorporating within it Oxton and Tranmere.

The improved communications also allowed Liverpool merchants to buy up and develop large estates on the Wirral. James Atherton and William Rowson developed the resort of New Brighton, and new estates for the gentry were also built at Egremont, Oxton, Claughton and Rock Ferry. Arrowe Hall was built for the Shaw family in 1835.

In the mid-19th century docks were established at Birkenhead and in the Wallasey Pool, and continuing development for a wide range of industry both there and along the banks of the Mersey. The New Chester Road was opened in 1833. The Wirral's first railway was built in 1840, planned by George Stephenson and connecting Birkenhead with Chester. In 1852 Price's Patent Candle Company built a factory and model village at Bromborough. This was followed in 1888 by William Lever's establishment of the much larger Sunlight soap factory and Port Sunlight garden village, designed to house its employees and provide them with a benign environment. The opening of the Manchester Ship Canal in 1894, with its outfall at Eastham, led to further port-side and industrial development beside the Mersey at Ellesmere Port.

In 1886, the Mersey Railway tunnel was opened, linking the Wirral and Liverpool. This led to the further rapid growth of suburbs in the Wirral, particularly in Wallasey, Hoylake and West Kirby, and later Bebington and Heswall. Wallasey's population grew to over 53,000 by 1901, and the town also achieved borough status soon after the turn of the century.

=== 20th century ===
The dockland areas of Wallasey and Birkenhead continued to develop and prosper in the first half of the century, specialising in trade with Africa and the Far East. A host of other port-related industries then came into existence, such as flour milling, tanning, edible oil refining and the manufacture of paint and rubber-based products. In 1922 a new oil dock was built at Stanlow near Ellesmere Port, and in 1934 oil refining began there. A large chemical and oil refining complex still dominates the area.

In 1929, the 3rd World Scout Jamboree was held at Arrowe Park and this celebrated the 21st Anniversary of the publication of Scouting for Boys. Thirty-five countries were represented by 30,000 Scouts, plus another 10,000 British Scouts who took the opportunity to camp in the vicinity.

The rail tunnel under the Mersey was supplemented by a vehicle tunnel in 1934, the Queensway Tunnel. A third tunnel opened in 1971, the Kingsway Tunnel, connecting with the M53 motorway which now runs up the centre of the peninsula. These new roads contributed to the massive growth of commuting by car between Liverpool and the Wirral, and the development of new suburban estates around such villages as Moreton, Upton, Greasby, Pensby, and Bromborough.

In 1940–1941, as part of the Blitz, parts of the Wirral, especially around the docks, suffered extensive bomb damage. There were 464 people killed in Birkenhead and 355 in Wallasey, and 80% of all houses in Birkenhead were either destroyed or badly damaged. During the Second World War, the Wirral held two RAF sites, RAF West Kirby (which was a camp, not an airfield) and RAF Hooton Park and a number of anti-aircraft sites to protect the docks of Birkenhead and Liverpool.

After the Second World War, economic decline began in the older industries in the area which had started to become known as Merseyside. However, there continued to be industrial development along the Mersey between Birkenhead and Ellesmere Port, including the large Vauxhall Motors car factory on the site of RAF Hooton Park.

=== 21st century ===
Plans were announced in 2006 for a £4.5b billion development around the docklands to be called Wirral Waters. The development is a mixture of industrial, office, residential and leisure facilities. Planning permission was granted in 2010 and work began on the site in 2011, with development work potentially lasting for 30 years.

== Geography ==
The Wirral can be defined both as a geographical peninsula and as a socio-cultural area. The current Metropolitan Borough of Wirral has a population of 312,293 (according to the 2001 census), and covers an area of 60.35 sq mi (156.3 km^{2}), bounded by the Cheshire Plain, the Dee and the Mersey. The Irish Sea lies to its north west side.

=== Geology ===
The peninsula is formed almost wholly from sedimentary bedrock of Triassic age, being sandstone, mudstones and siltstones. Strata exposed at or near the modern surface include the following (in stratigraphic order i.e. uppermost/youngest at top):

- Mercia Mudstone Group
  - Sidmouth Mudstone Formation
  - Tarporley Siltstone Formation
- Sherwood Sandstone Group
  - Helsby Sandstone Formation (divided into an upper Frodsham Sandstone Member and a lower Delamere Member in places)
  - Wilmslow Sandstone Formation
  - Chester Pebble Beds Formation
  - Kinnerton Sandstone Formation

A small outcrop of Carboniferous rocks occurs around Little Neston, being an extension of the Flintshire Coalfield across the Dee estuary. These Coal Measures rocks were formerly exploited by a small mining operation.

The strata have a slight, generally easterly dip and are cut by numerous extensional faults most of which are aligned broadly north–south. For the most part the bedrock is poorly exposed being covered by superficial deposits of Quaternary age. Notable exposures of the Helsby Sandstone occur at Bidston Hill and at Red Rocks at the northwestern tip of the Wirral along with the tidal islands at Hilbre. Elsewhere Mercia Mudstone rocks outcrop prominently at Caldy Hill, Thurstaston Common and Heswall Dales.

Much of the Wirral is covered by a mantle of glacial till, a legacy of the last ice age. Wind-blown sands cover the northern coastal margin. Low ground behind these sand are reclaimed tidal flat deposits which also extend into the heavily modified Birket which occupies a buried bedrock channel. This channel and others beneath the Dee and Mersey estuaries were formed in part by the southeasterly movement of Irish Sea Ice during successive ice ages. Low cliffs of the Kinnerton Sandstone at Burton Point are part of a relict shoreline, the Dee estuary having silted up during the post-glacial period. The former coast can be traced from Blacon northwest to Burton Point and thence to Parkgate where spring tides still reach the historic coastline. A well developed glacial drainage channel, known as the Deva Spillway cuts across the base of the peninsula between the two estuaries on either side of the Wirral and is interpreted as having played a major part in the deglaciation of the region in late-glacial/post-glacial times.

=== Physical geography ===
Although it has been stated that "it is difficult to find any work in which there is a written description of the exact area defining the Wirral Peninsula", historian Stephen Roberts defines it as "the peninsula which is bounded by the Dee and Mersey estuaries, Irish Sea and ... the route of the Shropshire Union Canal between Ellesmere Port and Chester". This definition extends the original hundred slightly further east, to the River Gowy.

The Shropshire Union Canal joins the Mersey at Ellesmere Port and the Dee at Chester. This canal technically makes the peninsula an island. In the north of the peninsula, the River Fender, Arrowe Brook and Greasby Brook drain into The Birket, which itself flows into the River Mersey via Wallasey Pool (Birkenhead Docks). Further south, the Clatter Brook and Dibbinsdale Brook drain into the Mersey at Bromborough Pool.

Two approximately parallel sandstone ridges run down the length of the peninsula. The western ridge is made up of Grange and Caldy Hills at 256 ft (78 m) in height, then Thurstaston Hill (298 ft, 91 m), Poll Hill in Heswall (350 ft, 110 m), the highest point on the Wirral) and Burton (222 ft, 68 m). The less continuous eastern ridge consists of Bidston Hill (231 ft, 70 m), Prenton (259 ft, 79 m) and Storeton Hill (229 ft, 70 m). The shallow Fender valley runs between these ridges.

=== Climate ===
The Wirral features a temperate maritime climate (Köppen: Cfb) with mild summers, cool winters and rainfall spread evenly throughout the year.

A weather station was maintained on the peninsula, at Bidston, between 1845 and 2002.

=== Human geography ===
The major urban centres of the Wirral are to its east: these include Birkenhead and Wallasey. To the west and south, the Wirral is more rural. Two-thirds of the population of the Wirral live on one third of the land in Birkenhead and Wallasey, according to Wirral Metropolitan Borough Council. Other towns to the south and west of this area are usually considered part of the Wirral: notably, Ellesmere Port is often described as one of its "border towns". For regional economic planning, the Metropolitan Borough of Wirral is considered part of the Liverpool City Region.

==== Settlements ====
There are many towns and villages on the Wirral. Those administered by the Metropolitan Borough of Wirral are listed in List of towns and villages in Wirral (borough). Those also on the Wirral but administered by Cheshire West and Chester include:

- Burton
- Capenhurst
- Ellesmere Port
- Great Sutton
- Hooton
- Little Sutton
- Ness
- Neston
- Overpool
- Parkgate
- Puddington
- Shotwick
- Willaston
- Little Neston

==== M53 Divide ====
The M53 is also seen as an east–west divide between the affluent and developing areas of the Wirral.

== Landmarks ==
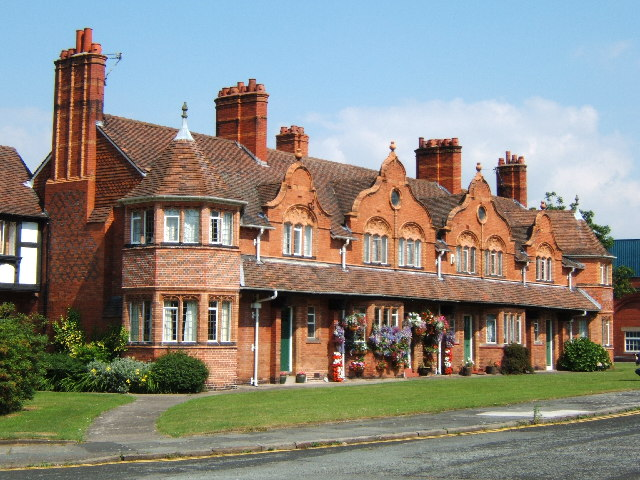
Typical houses in Port Sunlight.

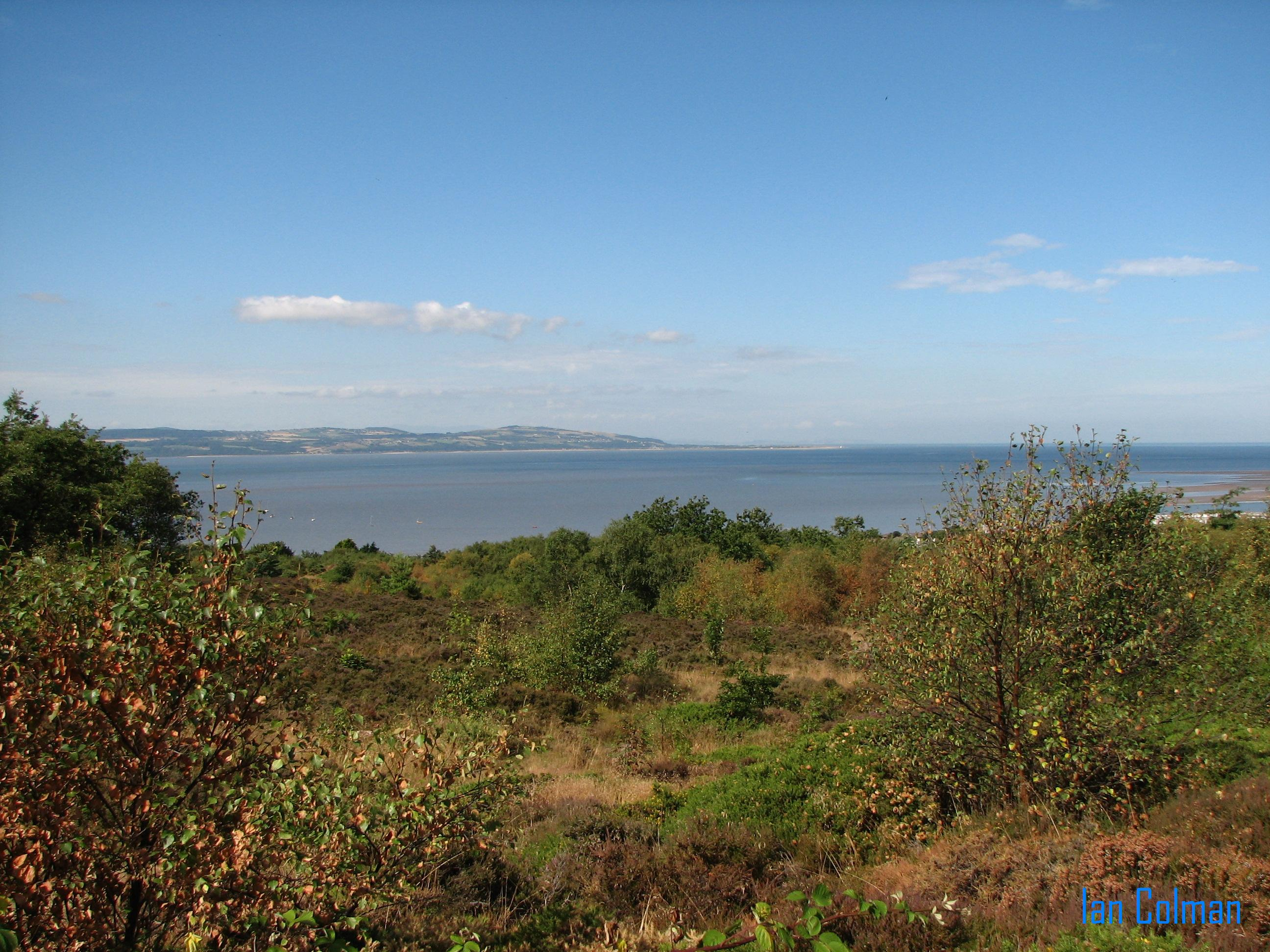
View from Caldy Hill to Wales over the River Dee.

Despite containing urban and industrial areas, the Wirral still has picturesque villages, sandy beaches, large areas of land owned by the National Trust, as well as views across the two estuaries and out into the Irish Sea. Wirral Council has identified over 130 public access points within its administrative area to beaches and to open water. Among the areas of open land are Bidston Hill, Caldy Hill, Eastham Country Park, including the Victorian Pleasure Gardens, Hilbre Island, North Wirral Coastal Park, Thurstaston Common and Thor's Stone and the Wirral Way. Ness Botanical Gardens are part of the University of Liverpool and have won many awards. The visitor centre at RSPB Burton Mere Wetlands provides birdwatching facilities in the Dee Estuary nature reserve.

Places of architectural interest include Hamilton Square, Rock Park and Port Sunlight. The view of the buildings on Liverpool's Pier Head when crossing on the Mersey Ferry is famous. Many villages of the Wirral such as Burton are also well preserved with their characteristic red sandstone buildings and walls. The old port of Parkgate also attracts many visitors. The arts are well represented by the Lady Lever Art Gallery at Port Sunlight and the Williamson Art Gallery in Birkenhead. The historical sites include Birkenhead Priory, Leasowe Lighthouse, Hadlow Road railway station and the buildings and ancient carvings on Bidston Hill.

== Accents and dialects ==
For reasons that are both social and geographical, accents on the east side of the Wirral tend to show a stronger Merseyside influence than those on the west side. Neston once had a distinctive dialect derived from the migrant workers at the Denhall Colliery.

== Wirral in literature ==
- Sir Gawain spent Christmas on the Wirral before his confrontation with the Green Knight.

The wilderness of Wirral:
few lived there
Who loved with a good heart
either God or man

- Olaf Stapledon, a writer, spent much of his life in West Kirby and Caldy, and many landscapes mentioned in his works can be identified.
- Local historian John Lamb has claimed that both Jules Verne and Robert Louis Stevenson based some of their major works on features on the Wirral Peninsula.
- Jim Bennett, although born in Liverpool has lived for many years on the Wirral and in Heswall. Many landmarks, places and shops are used in his writing. His collection of poems Larkhill was nominated for the Ted Hughes Poetry Award.
- The Wirral is described in Helen Forrester's book Twopence to Cross the Mersey (1974) as a place unreachable and comparably rich from the perspective of a poor girl struggling to live with her family in Liverpool during the Great Depression, despite having an aunt in West Kirby and the Mersey ferry costing just two old pence.
- Maria V. Snyder named the maximum security prison in her book Spy Glass after the Wirral, after she was awarded the "Wirral paperback of the year" by school pupils for her earlier book Poison Study.
- The Wirral is the setting of the novel Awaydays by Kevin Samson, published by Cape in March 1998 and filmed in 2009. Set in 1979, the story follows a music-loving young man who hides his middle-class background when he joins a group of hooligans who follow Tranmere Rovers.
- Ramsey Campbell, a writer, has lived most of his life on the Wirral, and many of his novels and short stories explore landscapes in the area (e.g. Thurstaston Common in his novel Thieving Fear).

== Television and film ==
The Wirral has hosted a variety of different films and television programmes. Chariots of Fire was filmed at various locations on the Wirral including the Oval Sports Centre, Bebington, the Woodside Ferry Terminal, and Bridge Cottage in Port Sunlight village, while the 1950 Ealing comedy The Magnet was filmed in Wallasey and New Brighton.

The 51st State was partly filmed around the docks in Birkenhead. Awaydays, based on a novel of the same name by Kevin Sampson, was filmed extensively on the Wirral. In 2012, the movie Blood, starring Paul Bettany and Stephen Graham was filmed on the Wirral.

The Queensway Tunnel in Birkenhead is also featured in the Harry Potter film, Harry Potter and the Deathly Hallows – Part 1 during the scene where Harry and Hagrid escape on a flying motorcycle and pass through the tunnel. The scene was filmed while the tunnel was closed for repairs. The 2013 film Fast & Furious 6 tunnel chase scene was filmed in the Queensway Tunnel. The unused Birkenhead Dock branch of the Queensway Tunnel was filmed as a New York underpass in the 2014 movie Jack Ryan: Shadow Recruit. In October 2017, the tunnel branch was used for the filming of the drama, Bulletproof, starring Noel Clarke and Ashley Walters.

Scenes for the 2016 film Florence Foster Jenkins, starring Hugh Grant and Meryl Streep, were filmed around Hoylake and New Brighton.

In television, sitcom Watching, produced by Granada Television between 1987 and 1993, was partly set and filmed at various Wirral locations, particularly Meols. In 2005, Mike Bassett: Manager, starring Ricky Tomlinson was a follow-up to the film Mike Bassett: England Manager, and featured a fictional football club called Wirral County, a parody of Tranmere Rovers, who Bassett (Tomlinson) managed after being sacked from the England job.

The BBC comedy drama Candy Cabs filmed external scenes in West Kirby and Hoylake in 2011. Wallasey School featured in Grease: The School Musical on Sky One in 2009.

The BBC Two drama Peaky Blinders was filmed at various locations on the Wirral, including Port Sunlight village. The second series of Peter Kay's Car Share also filmed at various Wirral locations including Meols and West Kirby. Sky One's 2016 thriller, The Five, starring Lee Ingleby shot scenes around the Wirral including in Port Sunlight.

The 2017 ITV drama Safe House starring Jason Watkins and Sunetra Sarker filmed several scenes on the peninsula.

In the autumn of 2017 filming began in Port Sunlight and Thornton Hough for a biopic about the author Tolkien starring Nicholas Hoult.

A row of cottages in the historic village of Port Sunlight also featured on the 2014 series of BBC Two's The Great Interior Design Challenge. The village also played host to two episodes of BBC One's The Antiques Roadshow hosted by Fiona Bruce.

In 2018, the feature film Official Secrets had two beach scenes filmed at Thurstaston beach on the Dee Estuary.

== Media ==
Local news and television programmes are provided by BBC North West and ITV Granada, the local television station TalkLiverpool also broadcasts to the area. Television signals are received from the Winter Hill TV transmitter. With its close proximity with North Wales, BBC Wales and ITV Cymru Wales can also be received from the Moel-y-Parc TV transmitter.

Wirral is served by the local radio stations: BBC Radio Merseyside, Heart North West, Capital North West & Wales, Radio City, Smooth North West, Greatest Hits Radio Liverpool & The North West, Radio Wirral, and Wirral Wave Radio, a community based station.

The area is served by the local newspapers: Wirral Globe and Liverpool Echo.

== Transport ==
The M53 motorway runs along the length of the Wirral, from near Chester. At the north eastern end, the Wirral is joined to Liverpool by three tunnels under the Mersey: two road tunnels, one from Wallasey (Kingsway) and one from Birkenhead (Queensway), and the Mersey Railway tunnel.

The Wirral peninsula is served by a network of bus routes. These are provided by larger companies whose networks of bus services in the North West of England are extensive, such as Arriva North West and Stagecoach Wirral. Furthermore, the peninsula is also served by many independent bus operators. Independent bus companies which operate on the peninsula include A2B Travel, Cumfybus, Helms Coaches and Eazibus.

Most bus services operate from the three bus stations: Birkenhead bus station, Heswall bus station and Woodside bus station, although many services start from other interchanges, such as New Brighton, Seacombe Ferry and Liscard Village.

The Wirral Line of the electrified Merseyrail network links West Kirby, New Brighton, Chester and Ellesmere Port via many other towns and villages to all four of Liverpool's city centre stations (James Street, Moorfields, Lime Street and Liverpool Central) through the underground Loop tunnel. Another railway line, the Borderlands Line, offers hourly diesel services from Bidston (on the West Kirby branch of the Wirral Line) to Wrexham in North Wales.

Regular Mersey Ferry crossings operate to Liverpool from both Woodside and Seacombe, providing a commuter shuttle and pleasure cruises.

The nearest passenger airports are Liverpool John Lennon Airport and Manchester Airport. There were plans to introduce commercial flights to nearby Hawarden Airport in North Wales, but these plans were dropped in 2014.

== Sports ==
=== Football ===
- Tranmere Rovers Football Club is the Wirral's only professional football club and play at Prenton Park, Birkenhead. They play in League Two of The Football League.
- Cammell Laird 1907 F.C. are a non-league football club on the Wirral and play in the North West Counties League at North West Construction Stadium, formerly Kirklands, Rock Ferry.
- Several Football League teams have played at New Brighton including the defunct New Brighton Tower F.C. and New Brighton A.F.C., who most recently played in the West Cheshire League.

=== Golf ===
- The Open Championship was played at the Royal Liverpool Golf Club in Hoylake in 1897, 1902, 1907, 1913, 1924, 1930, 1936, 1947, 1956, 1967, 2006, 2014 and 2023. The Women's British Open was played at Royal Liverpool in 2012.

=== Rugby ===
- Anselmians RUFC formed 1947 by former pupils of St Anselm's College. They play rugby union at Eastham.
- Birkenhead Park FC play at the Upper Park in Birkenhead Park and compete in the fifth tier of rugby union, National League 3 North.
- Caldy RFC play at Paton Field, Thurstaston. They are a rugby union club who play in England's second tier, the RFU Championship.
- Hoylake RFC
- New Brighton RUFC
- Oldershaw RUFC
- Prenton Rugby Club was formed in 1992 with the merger of two other rugby clubs, The Old Instonians and The Old Rockferrians.
- Port Sunlight RFC formed in 1908 by employees of the Lever Brothers company
- Wallasey RUFC
- Wirral Rugby Club founded 1936 by former pupils of Wirral Grammar School for Boys and play rugby union at Memorial Ground near Clatterbridge.

=== Watersports ===
- Hoylake, in north west Wirral is one of the premier European land sailing (sand yachting) sites, and was host to the week-long European Championships in September 2007 and again in 2011.
- Peninsula Canoe Club is a canoeing and kayaking club based in the area.
- West Kirby, in north west Wirral has a marine lake for windsurfing, sailing and sea kayaking and hosts the British Open Team Racing Championship (Wilson Trophy) sailing competition.
- New Brighton is a popular place for jet-skiing as well as for paddle boarding and kitesurfing.

=== Cricket ===
- Birkenhead Park Cricket Club
- Birkenhead St Mary's Cricket Club
- Irby Cricket Club
- Neston Cricket Club
- Upton Cricket Club
- Wirral Cricket Club was founded in 1936 as part of the Wirral Club. The club became noted after recording the game's lowest score in 100 years, on 27 April 2014.

=== Hockey ===
- Neston South Wirral Hockey Club, based at Neston Cricket Club, is the largest club on the Wirral with 8 men's and 5 ladies' sides playing each Saturday.
- Oxton Hockey Club was founded in 1888 and is now a National League side.

== See also ==
- Wirral Hundred
- Wirral Waters
