= List of places in Merseyside =

Some of the larger settlements of Merseyside.

This is a list of cities, towns, villages and other populated places in the ceremonial county of Merseyside, England.

== A ==
Aigburth - Ainsdale - Aintree - Allerton - Anfield

== B ==
Barnston - Bebington - Beechwood - Belle Vale - Bidston - Billinge - Birkdale - Birkenhead - Blowick - Blundellsands - Bold - Bootle - Bowring Park - Brighton le Sands - Brimstage - Broadgreen - Bromborough - Bromborough Pool

== C ==
Caldy - Canning - Childwall - Churchtown - Claughton - Clock Face - Clubmoor - Crank - Cressington - Crosby - Crossens - Croxteth - Croxteth Park Estate

== D ==
Dingle - Dovecot

== E ==
Earlestown - Eastham - Eastham Ferry - Eccleston - Eccleston Park - Edge Hill - Egremont - Everton

== F ==
Fairfield - Fazakerley - Ford - Formby - Frankby - Freshfield

== G ==
Garston - Gateacre - Gayton - Gillmoss - Golborne Dale - Grange - Grange Park - Grassendale - Greasby - Great Altcar

== H ==
Halewood - Halsnead Park - Haydock - Heswall - Heswall Hills - Higher Bebington - Higher Tranmere - Hightown - Hillside - Hoylake - Hunts Cross - Huyton

== I ==
Ince Blundell - Irby

== K ==
Kensington - Kings Moss - Kirkby - Kirkdale - Knotty Ash - Knowsley Village - Knowsley Park

== L ==
Landican - Larton - Leasowe - Liscard - Litherland - Little Altcar - Little Crosby - Liverpool - Lower Heswall - Lunt - Lydiate

== M ==
Maghull - Marshside - Melling - Melling Mount - Meols - Meols Cop - Moreton - Mossley Hill

== N ==
Netherley - Netherton - New Brighton - New Ferry - Newton - Newton-le-Willows - Noctorum - Norris Green -

== O ==
Oglet - Old Roan - Old Swan - Orrell Park - Overchurch - Oxton

== P ==
Page Moss - Parr - Pensby - Port Sunlight - Poulton - Prenton - Prescot

== R ==
Raby - Raby Mere - Rainford - Rainhill - Roby - Rock Ferry

== S ==
Saughall Massie - Seacombe - Seaforth - Sefton - Southport - Speke - Spital - St Helens - Stockbridge Village - Stoneycroft - Sutton Leach - Sutton Manor

== T ==
Tarbock - Thatto Heath - Thingwall - Thornton - Thornton Hough - Thurstaston - Toxteth - Tranmere - Tuebrook

== U ==
Upton

== V ==
Vauxhall

== W ==
Waddicar - Wallasey - Wallasey Village - Walton - Waterloo - Wavertree - West Derby - West Kirby - Whiston - Windle - Woodchurch - Woodvale - Woolton

== See also ==
- List of places in England
