= List of populated places in Wirral Borough =

This is a list of populated places in the Metropolitan Borough of Wirral.

- Barnston
- Bebington
- Beechwood
- Bidston
- Birkenhead
- Brimstage
- Bromborough
- Caldy
- Clatterbridge
- Claughton
- Eastham
- Egremont
- Ford
- Frankby
- Gayton
- Grange
- Greasby
- Heswall
- Hoylake
- Irby
- Landican
- Larton
- Leasowe
- Liscard
- Meols
- Moreton
- New Brighton
- New Ferry
- Newton
- Noctorum
- Oxton
- Pensby
- Port Sunlight
- Poulton
- Prenton
- Raby Mere
- Raby
- Rock Ferry
- Saughall Massie
- Seacombe
- Spital
- Storeton
- Thingwall
- Thornton Hough
- Thurstaston
- Tranmere
- Upton
- Wallasey
- Wallasey Village
- West Kirby
- Woodchurch
- Woodside
