= Newton, Merseyside =

Village in Wirral, Merseyside, England

Coordinates: 53.373831°N 3.149318°W

Newton
- Village
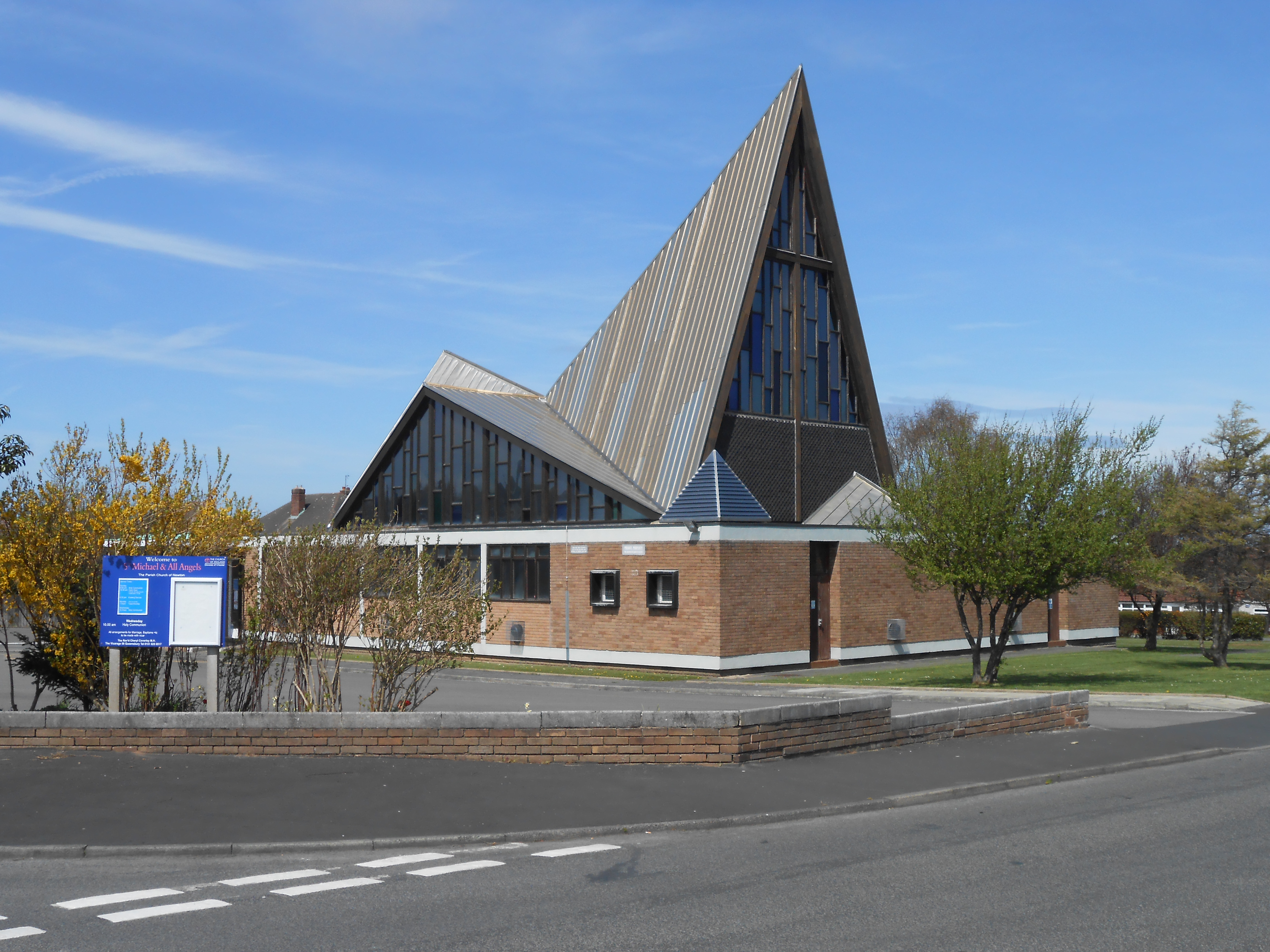
- St Michael and All Angels Church, Newton

- Location within Merseyside
- Population: 5,750 (2001 census)
- OS grid reference: SJ 236 869
  - London: 181 mi (291 km) SE
- Metropolitan borough: Wirral
- Metropolitan county: Merseyside
- Region: North West
- Country: England
- Sovereign state: United Kingdom
- Post town: WIRRAL
- Postcode district: CH48
- Dialling code: 0151
- ISO 3166 code: GB-WRL
- Police: Merseyside
- Fire: Merseyside
- Ambulance: North West
- UK Parliament: Wirral West

Newton is a village on the Wirral Peninsula, part of the Metropolitan Borough of Wirral, Merseyside, England. It is contiguous with West Kirby and its hillside suburb, Grange, to the west. The hamlet of Larton is to the east. Newton is part of the West Kirby and Thurstaston electoral ward and the Wirral West parliamentary constituency.

Newton consists of a village hall, post office, public house and a general store. The local park, aptly named Newton Park, has a football pitch, outdoor basketball courts and a playground for children. Wirral Council also has several allotments in Newton that are provided for residents to grow their own vegetables and plants.

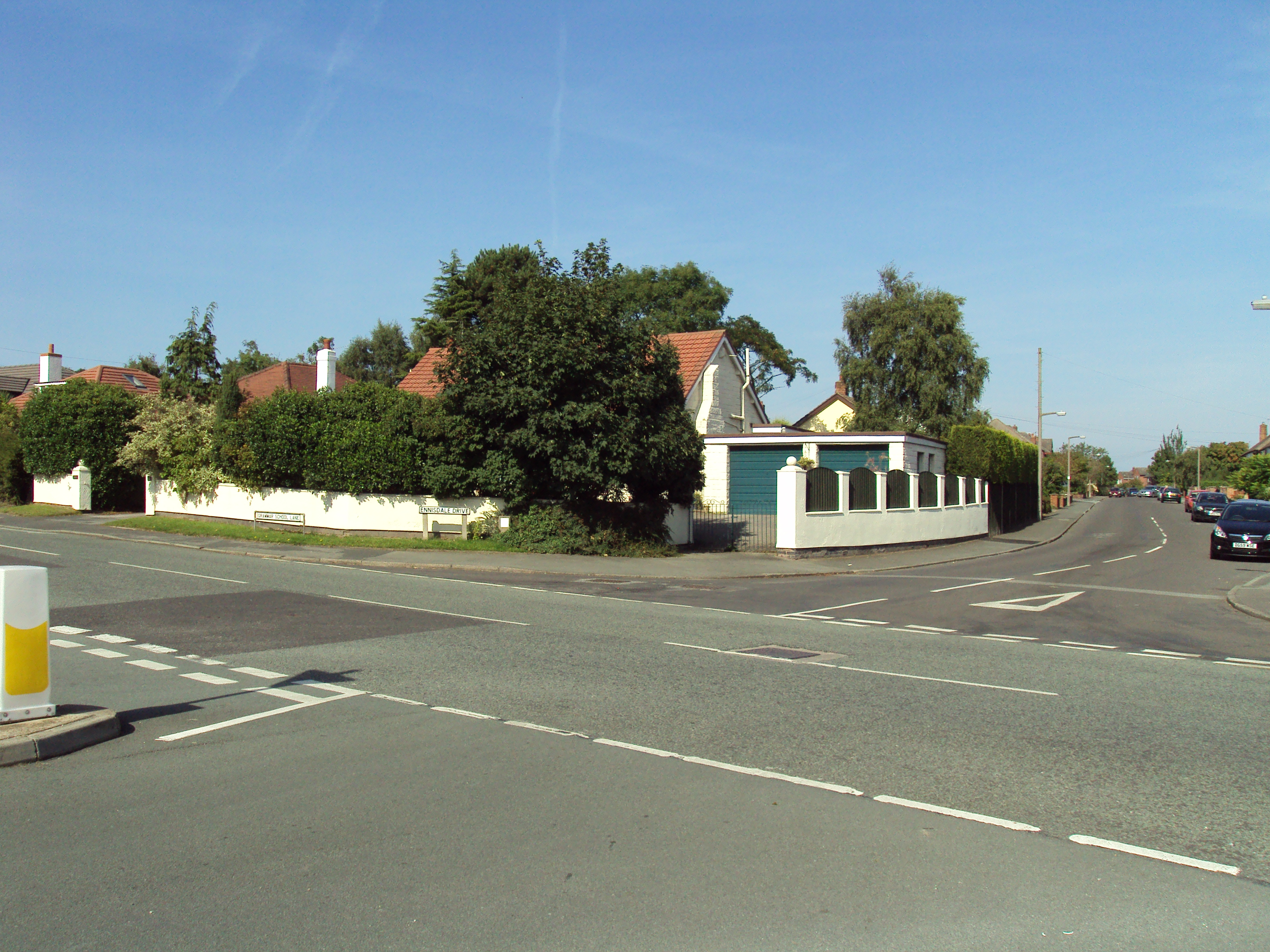
Grammar School Lane, Newton. Leading up to Calday Grange Grammar School

== History ==
The name of the village means "new settlement or farmstead" from the Old English words nīwe and tūn.

Newton was previously combined with the nearby hamlet of Larton as Newton cum Larton, part of West Kirby parish of the Wirral Hundred, in the county of Cheshire. Its population was 49 in 1801 and 44 in 1851. A civil parish from 1866, it was abolished in 1889 and subsumed into the nearby civil parish of Grange. Between 1894 and 1933 Newton was part of Wirral Rural District, then Hoylake Urban District until 1974.

== Geography ==
Two branches of Newton Brook border the north and the east of Newton. The brook is a tributary of Greasby Brook. The two branches of Newton Brook merge near to Larton.

== Transport ==
=== Road ===
The B5139 Frankby Road passes through Newton. This road has junctions with the B5192 Saughall Massie Road and the A540 Column Road, towards West Kirby.

=== Rail ===
West Kirby railway station is approximately 2.5 km (1.6 mi) to the west. This station is on the Wirral line of the Merseyrail network, with frequent services to Liverpool.

== Education ==
The locality is served by Hilbre High School, Calday Grange Grammar School and West Kirby Grammar School at secondary education level.

== Bibliography ==
- Mortimer, William Williams (1847). The History of the Hundred of Wirral. London: Whittaker & Co. p.274.
