= Upton, Merseyside =

Coordinates: 53.385°N 3.099°W

Upton
- Village
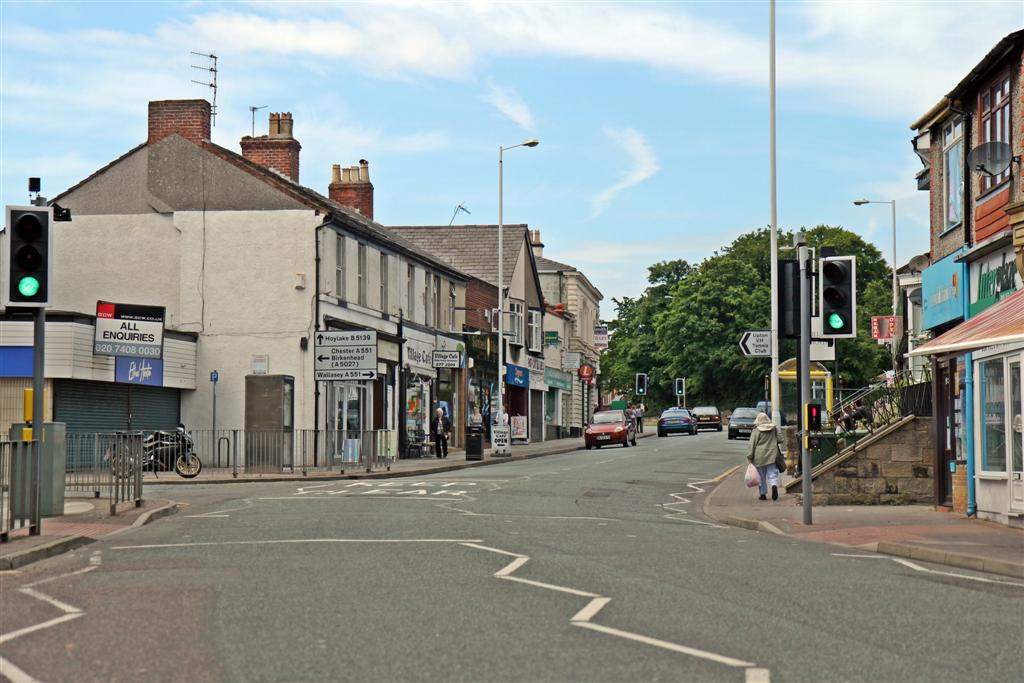
- The centre of Upton Village

- Location within Merseyside
- Population: 16,130 (2011 census)
- OS grid reference: SJ270881
  - London: 180 mi (290 km) SE
- Metropolitan borough: Wirral
- Metropolitan county: Merseyside
- Region: North West
- Country: England
- Sovereign state: United Kingdom
- Post town: WIRRAL
- Postcode district: CH49
- Dialling code: 0151
- ISO 3166 code: GB-WRL
- Police: Merseyside
- Fire: Merseyside
- Ambulance: North West
- UK Parliament: Divided between Wirral West and Wallasey

Upton is a village in the northern part of the Wirral Peninsula, England, and is situated within 4 miles (6.4 km) of Birkenhead, 4 miles (6.4 km) of the Dee Estuary, a similar distance from the River Mersey, and 2 miles (3.2 km) from Liverpool Bay. The village is a ward of the Metropolitan Borough of Wirral in the metropolitan county of Merseyside. Upton was in the traditional county of Cheshire. At the 2011 census, the population was 16,130.

Upton was originally settled as an Anglo-Saxon farming community, and remained as a farming community until the village's rapid urbanisation and expansion from the mid-19th century. This was brought about by the development of Liverpool as a major port, with rail and road links across the Mersey estuary. The village now has a strong service economy which is based primarily around healthcare and retail, with a variety of places nearby, and within the village, to pursue sport and leisure activities.

== History ==
=== Etymology ===
The name Upton is from the Old English upp, meaning up, high or a hill, and tūn, meaning a farmstead or settlement. Upton therefore could be explained as meaning Hill Farm. This is still recognisable today, as Upton is on a low hill. As the name Upton is relatively common, it was sometimes known historically as Upton in Wyrhale (in 1307) or Upton by Birkenhead.

The name Overchurch may translate as "shore church", from the Old English ofer meaning a shore and cirice, a church. This implies that, during the Anglo-Saxon era, the shoreline of the Irish Sea was much closer to the centre of the village.

=== Ownership of the manor ===
Upton was originally settled as a farming community, during the Anglo-Saxon period. In Norman times, Upton was listed in the Domesday Book of 1086 as Optone and was written as being in the possession of William Malbank. The manor passed to the Orrebies under the family of Praers, and then through the Arderne family, and by marriage to Baldwin of Bold in 1310. His descendants owned the manor for six generations, before it was sold in 1614. Subsequent owners have included the Earls of Derby. Notably, as a likely consequence of the 8th Earl of Derby who lived at nearby Bidston Hall. From Elizabethan times, the manor was associated with Upton Hall, which passed hands along with the manor. Upton Hall was sold by the Webster family to the Society of the Faithful Companions of Jesus (FCJ) who turned it into a school (currently Upton Hall School FCJ).

=== Early modern ===
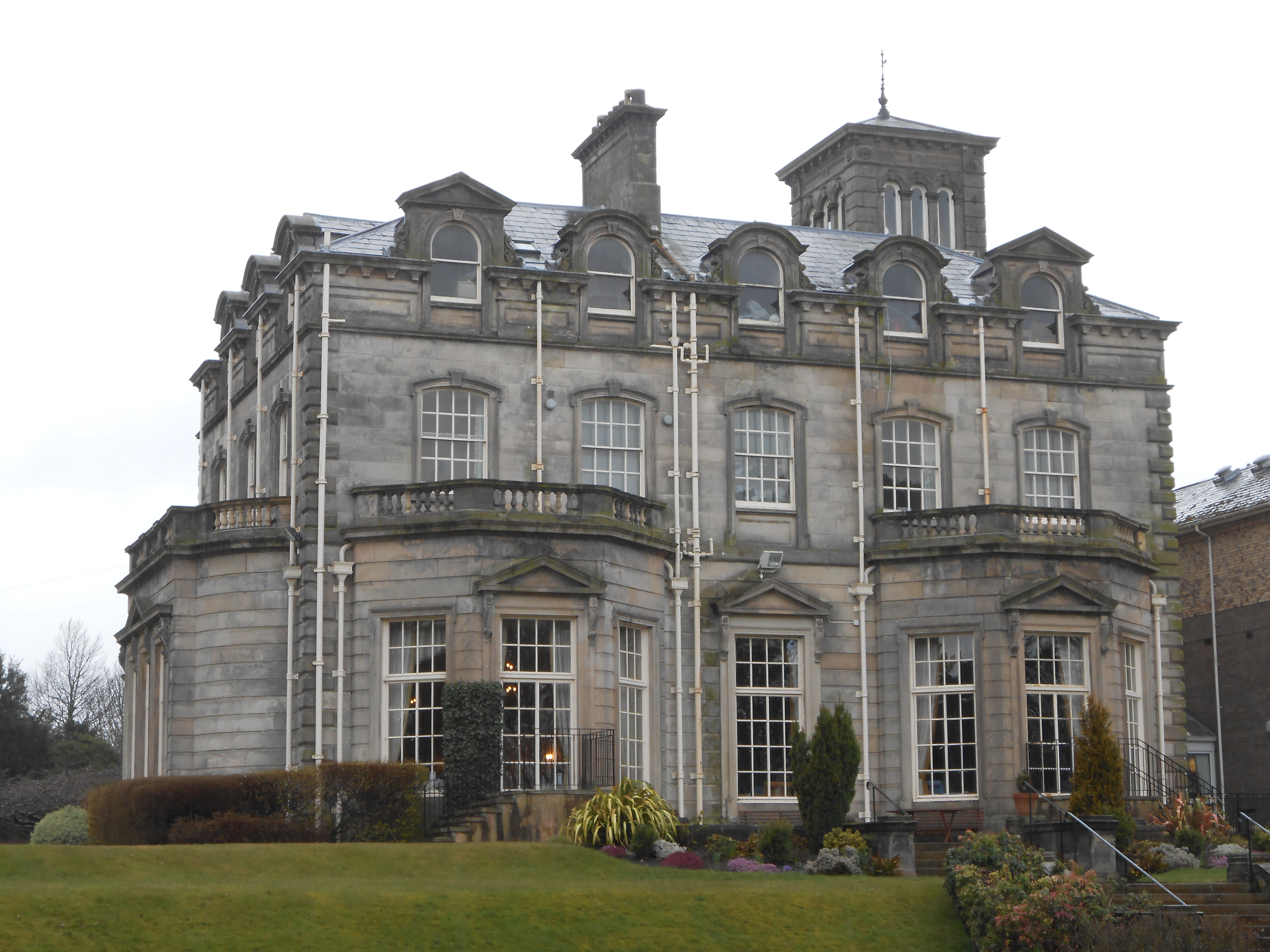
Upton Manor.

Upton was the primary economic centre of northern Wirral until the industrial development of Birkenhead during the mid-19th century. Five important local roads converged on the village, and its main thoroughfare was the place of a weekly market, recorded as being held from 1662. Fairs were also held in the village at Michaelmas and Easter.

When the original parish church at Overchurch was pulled down in 1813, a runestone, attributed to the 7th or 8th centuries, was discovered in the ruins. It has been interpreted as a memorial to Æthelmund, perhaps a local leader or missionary. The stone is now kept at the Grosvenor Museum in Chester.

"..though now only a small village, Upton was formerly considered the metropolis of the lower mediety of Wirral, and had two annual fairs of considerable importance, and also a weekly market that was discontinued in 1620, the village having been recently almost entirely rebuilt, contains several good houses, among which may be particularly mentioned Upton Hall ..."

—said of Upton in the History of the Hundred of Wirral by William Williams Mortimer, 1847.

A major contributor to the village was William Inman, owner of the Inman Line, who donated money for the construction of St. Mary's Church. Inman resided at Upton Manor, within the grounds of Upton Park. Both Upton Manor and St. Mary's Church were designed by John Cunningham.

Few buildings remain in Upton from before the mid-19th Century. Two notable examples are the Stone House at the top of the village, on Ford Road, and the Old Smithy on Rake Lane. These buildings are both built of local red sandstone, hewn into large blocks. They are both of similar material and style to many old buildings which are found throughout Cheshire and Lancashire farming communities. Neither of these buildings is designated as a listed building.

=== World War II ===
Just prior to World War II, the War Department requisitioned a large amount of land to the northern side of Arrowe Farm, next to the Police station. This was used for military weapons storage. The camp was known as 64 Anti-Aircraft Ordnance Depot. The site had three reinforced bunkers for storage of ordnance, in the area which is now occupied by the Sainsbury's building. The site eventually came into the use of the Territorial Army and part of the area is currently in use by army and air force cadets.

During this period, RAF West Kirby was also situated just under 2 miles (3.2 km) west the centre of the village, along Saughall Massie Road, and backed on to Larton.

=== Civic history ===
Upton was a township in the ancient parish of Overchurch in the Wirral Hundred, which became a civil parish in 1866 named Upton by Birkenhead. Between 1894 and 1933 Upton was administered as part of Wirral Rural District. The civil parish was disbanded on 1 April 1933 and merged with Birkenhead St Mary and Wallasey and became part of the county boroughs of Birkenhead and Wallasey. In 1931 the parish had a population of 2564.

On 1 April 1974, local government reorganisation in England and Wales resulted in most of the Wirral Peninsula, including Upton, transferring from the county of Cheshire to the newly created county of Merseyside.

== Geography, geology and environment ==
Upton lies at the geographic centre of the northern part of the Wirral Peninsula, 3.7 kilometres (2.3 miles) from the Irish Sea at Leasowe Lighthouse, 6.4 kilometres (4 mi) north-east of the Dee Estuary and a similar distance south-west of the River Mersey. Upton sits on a low-lying hill, in a wide and shallow glacial U-shaped valley, formed during the Quaternary Ice Age, between Bidston Hill and Thurstaston Hill. The underlying bedrock is Triassic bunter sandstone of the Helsby Sandstone Formation and the Sidmouth Mudstone Formation. This is overlain with boulder clay from the Quaternary Ice Age, similar to the nearby Dee Cliffs, and clay soil. The bedrock is not usually visible, as it is on the nearby Bidston Hill.

The highest point in Upton is 32 metres (105 ft) above sea level, just off the junction with the A551 and the B5139, at Moreton Road, in the centre of the village. A further prominence of 26 metres (85 ft) above sea level is at Upton Manor, 0.8 kilometres (870 yd) from the centre of the village. Most of the populated area is more than 10 metres (33 ft) above sea level, and most of the ground is on a gentle hillside. Consequently, Upton has avoided the significant flooding which can happen in the nearby low-lying Fender valley. Due to its inland location and elevation Upton is not prone to coastal flooding, which can happen at West Kirby, Hoylake, Meols and New Brighton.

Upton is bounded by Arrowe Brook, at Upton Meadow, and the River Fender which is alongside the M53 motorway. Both are tributaries of the Birket, which discharges into West Float and then into the River Mersey.

=== Upton Meadow Millennium Wood ===
Upton Meadow Millennium Wood is an ancient, semi-natural woodland, a community forest and a county wildlife site which has informal public access. The area has 1.5 kilometres (0.93 mi) of footpaths and a bridleway along the western boundary. The area is one of the last remaining unbuilt, natural areas in Upton. Parts of the site were planted in 1997 and the site was leased to the Woodland Trust on a 99-year lease, from Wirral Borough Council, in the same year. The woodland contains a mixture of species such as oak, ash, hazel, birch, blackthorn and hawthorn. Additional plantations by the local council, in 1980, have also included maple, grey alder, grey willow and guelder rose. Other plants include holly, English elm and sycamore. The area has a pond which contains a good population of invertebrates and some amphibians, with a significant colony of common toad. The meadow is 15 hectares (37 acres) and the habitat is rare, within the local area.

=== Climate ===
Upton has a temperate maritime climate (Köppen: Cfb), similar to much of the rest of the United Kingdom. Being close to the sea and sheltered from the prevailing south-westerly wind by Snowdonia, the area has relatively warm summers. The winters are generally mild and wet, mornings with light frost are common, and there are few days of snow. The nearest official weather station, as the crow flies, is at Hall Road in Crosby, which is about 12.1 kilometres (7.5 mi) away.

Climate data for Upton/(Crosby), elevation 9m, 1981–2010
Month	Jan	Feb	Mar	Apr	May	Jun	Jul	Aug	Sep	Oct	Nov	Dec	Year
Mean daily maximum °C (°F)	7.2 (45.0)	7.3 (45.1)	9.4 (48.9)	12.2 (54.0)	15.6 (60.1)	17.9 (64.2)	19.7 (67.5)	19.4 (66.9)	17.3 (63.1)	13.9 (57.0)	10.2 (50.4)	7.5 (45.5)	13.2 (55.8)
Mean daily minimum °C (°F)	2.4 (36.3)	2.1 (35.8)	3.8 (38.8)	5.1 (41.2)	7.9 (46.2)	11.1 (52.0)	13.3 (55.9)	13.2 (55.8)	11.0 (51.8)	8.2 (46.8)	5.2 (41.4)	2.5 (36.5)	7.2 (45.0)
Average precipitation mm (inches)	74.9 (2.95)	54.4 (2.14)	63.6 (2.50)	54.3 (2.14)	54.9 (2.16)	66.2 (2.61)	59.0 (2.32)	68.9 (2.71)	71.7 (2.82)	97.3 (3.83)	82.6 (3.25)	88.8 (3.50)	836.6 (32.94)
Average rainy days (≥ 1.0 mm)	13.8	10.7	12.5	10.4	10.6	10.5	10.1	11.2	11.5	14.8	14.6	13.9	144.3
Source: Met Office

- The earliest sunrise is on 18 June, at 4.43am. The latest sunrise is on 1 January, at 8.28am.
- The earliest sunset is on 14 December, at 3.53pm. The latest sunset is on 24 June, at 9.45pm.
- The Winter Solstice has 7h 29m 05s of daylight, and the Summer Solstice has 17h 01m 10s of daylight. Complete darkness occurs for about three hours a night, during midsummer, with about two hours of twilight either side.

== Demography ==
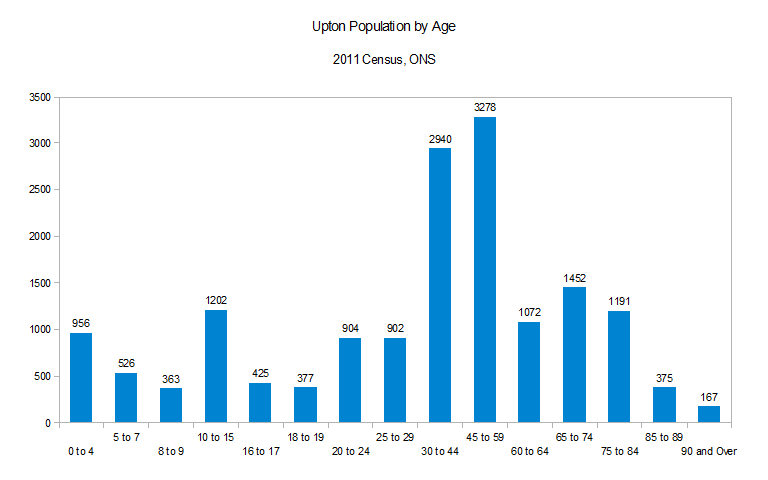
The population, by age, at the 2011 census.

The population was 141 in 1801, 227 in 1851, 622 in 1889 and 788 in 1901. At the 2001 census, the population was recorded as 15,731 (7,268 males, 8,463 females). At the 2011 census, the population had increased to 16,130 (7,529 males, 8,601 females).

=== Key Statistics ===
(Source: 2011 census)

In 2011 there were 31.7 persons per hectare and 7,127 occupied households in Upton.

17.2% of people aged 16 or older have five or more grade A-C GCSEs or equivalent. 29.2% have no formal qualifications. Both these percentages are higher than those for England as a whole.

Of the part of the adult population that is between 16 and 74 years of age, 34.7% is economically inactive and 5.4% is economically active but unemployed. This gives a combined non-employment rate of 40.1% of the adult population. 59.9% of adults are, therefore, occupied with work, training or education, in one form or another. 95.3% of the population is White British.

73.4% of people are Christian, 18.7% of people have no religion and 6.7% of people did not state their religion. The remaining 1.2% of people have other religions.

== Governance ==
The village is part of the Metropolitan Borough of Wirral, in the metropolitan county of Merseyside. It is also within the parliamentary constituency of Wirral West. The current member of parliament is Margaret Greenwood, a Labour MP who is the fourth representative for the constituency. The previous incumbent of the post, the third representative for the constituency, was Esther McVey, a Conservative politician who was MP from 2010 until 2015. The second representative, Stephen Hesford, who was a Labour MP and had a constituency office in the village. He was MP from 1997 until 2010. In 1983, the first representative of the newly formed constituency was David Hunt, a Conservative MP, who was elected at a by-election for the former Wirral constituency, from 1976. Earlier MPs have included Selwyn Lloyd, a former Foreign Secretary, Chancellor of the Exchequer and Speaker of the House of Commons, as well as William Lever, the founder of Lever Brothers.

The area is also a local government ward of the Metropolitan Borough of Wirral. Upton is represented on Wirral Metropolitan Borough Council by three councillors. These are Jean Robinson, Tony Smith and Stuart Whittingham, who are all Labour councillors. The most recent local elections took place on 2 May 2019.

== Economy ==
The major employment sectors, in Upton, are healthcare and retail. The major employer is the Wirral University Teaching Hospital NHS Foundation Trust at Arrowe Park Hospital. Other significant employers include J Sainsbury PLC, Argos, McDonald's and the Royal Mail.

The village had a branch of one of the United Kingdom's major banks, Barclays Bank, in a building formerly occupied by Martins Bank. The Post Office also operates banking services.

=== Wirral Business Park ===
A former major employer was the Champion spark plug factory on Arrowe Brook Road. The factory was opened in 1968. At its peak, the business employed over 1,000 people in Upton. The factory was closed in 2006 with production transferred to Italy. After the business withdrew from the area, the buildings were allowed to remain and the site is now operated as the Wirral Business Park and, informally, as the Champion's Business Park.

=== Upton Retail Park ===
Upton Retail Park is a small retail park which was developed in the early 1990s. The development was built on 5.7 ha (14 acres) of Upton Meadow, adjacent to Arrowe Park Road and Upton Bypass. There was local protest to the new development on a green space.

=== Services ===
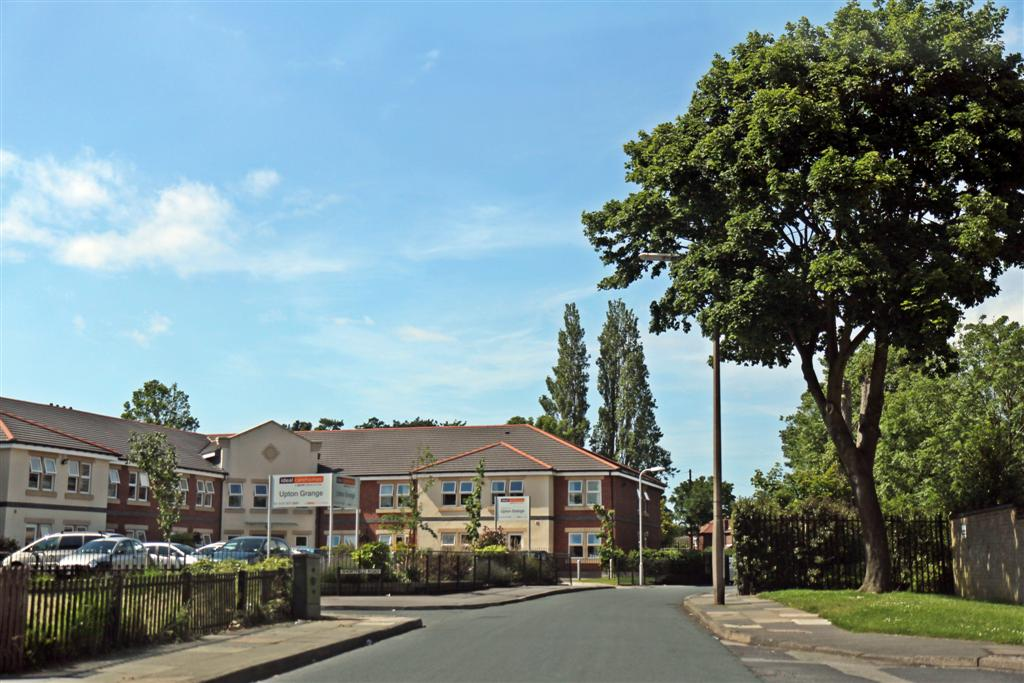
The care home on Salacre Lane.

Arrowe Park Hospital is barely a mile from the centre of the village and includes an Accident and Emergency department. Upton is served by Upton Group Practice, a dentist and two opticians. Pharmacies in the village include Boots Pharmacy and pharmacies at Upton Group Practice and Arrowe Park Hospital. Upton is served by several residential, care and nursing homes, one of which is situated at Upton Manor and another on Ford Road, as well as a care home on Salacre Lane.

Upton has its own Police station, which is a branch of Merseyside Police, and an ambulance station, operated by the North West Ambulance Service, at the nearby Arrowe Park Hospital. It formerly had a fire station, which was a branch of Merseyside Fire and Rescue Service until its closure in 2019. The village has a Jobcentre Plus and a postal sorting office. There is a driving test centre on Arrowe Park Road and two MOT test centres, one of which is on Manor Drive and the other on Arrowe Park Road, next to the [closed?] fire station. The Arrowebrook telephone exchange is situated on Church Road and serves approximately 25,000 residential premises and 686 non-residential premises. The exchange is operated by BT. This provides ADSL and SDSL services, among others.

The village once had several toll houses, only one of which now remains. The toll houses were used by passing travellers, during the 19th century, to pay for use of the turnpike. These were situated at the junction of Saughall Massie Lane and Old Greasby Road, at the top of Moreton Road, and the Arrowe Park Road junction with Arrowe Brook Road. This final toll house is the only surviving example.

== Community ==
=== Schools ===
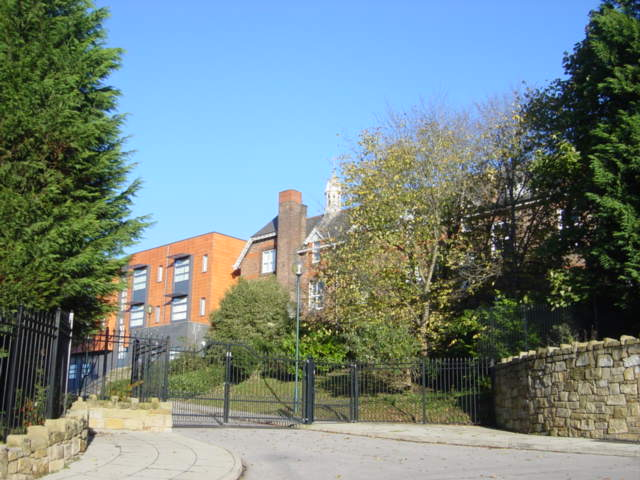
Upton Hall School.

Upton has a number of schools. These include Overchurch Primary School and St. Joseph's Primary School, which are both on Moreton Road, and Hayfield School on Manor Drive. These all cater for children between the ages of four and eleven. Overchurch Primary School is separated into two parts. These are Overchurch Infants' School, which is for children between the ages of 4 and 8 years, and Overchurch Junior School, which is for children from 9 to 11 years old. Upton Hall School FCJ, a grammar school for girls, is situated near to the centre of the village, with entrances on Moreton Road and Saughall Massie Lane. The original school in Upton was situated on Rake Lane, before moving to the building which is now part of St. Mary's church hall, and then onto Overchurch Primary School. The original school building still stands in Rake Lane and was used as a church hall for teenagers, prior to the opening of "The Bank". Other former schools include St. Benedict's High School which has now been closed and demolished, as well as Kingsley Nursery School, which suffered a similar fate. Upton is also home to Wirral's only bilingual day nursery, Habla which caters for children aged 6 months to 5 years.

=== Churches ===
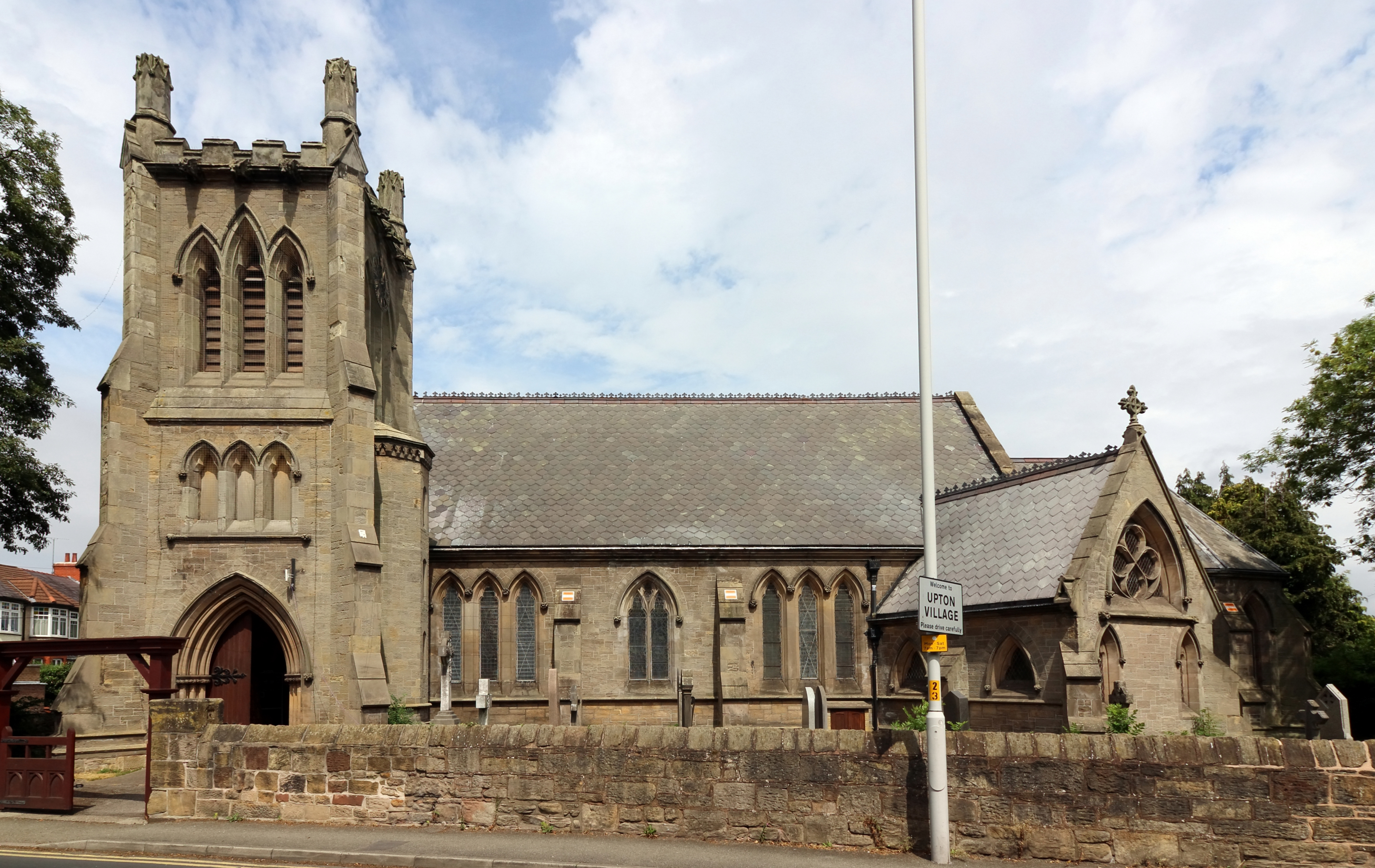
St. Mary's Church.

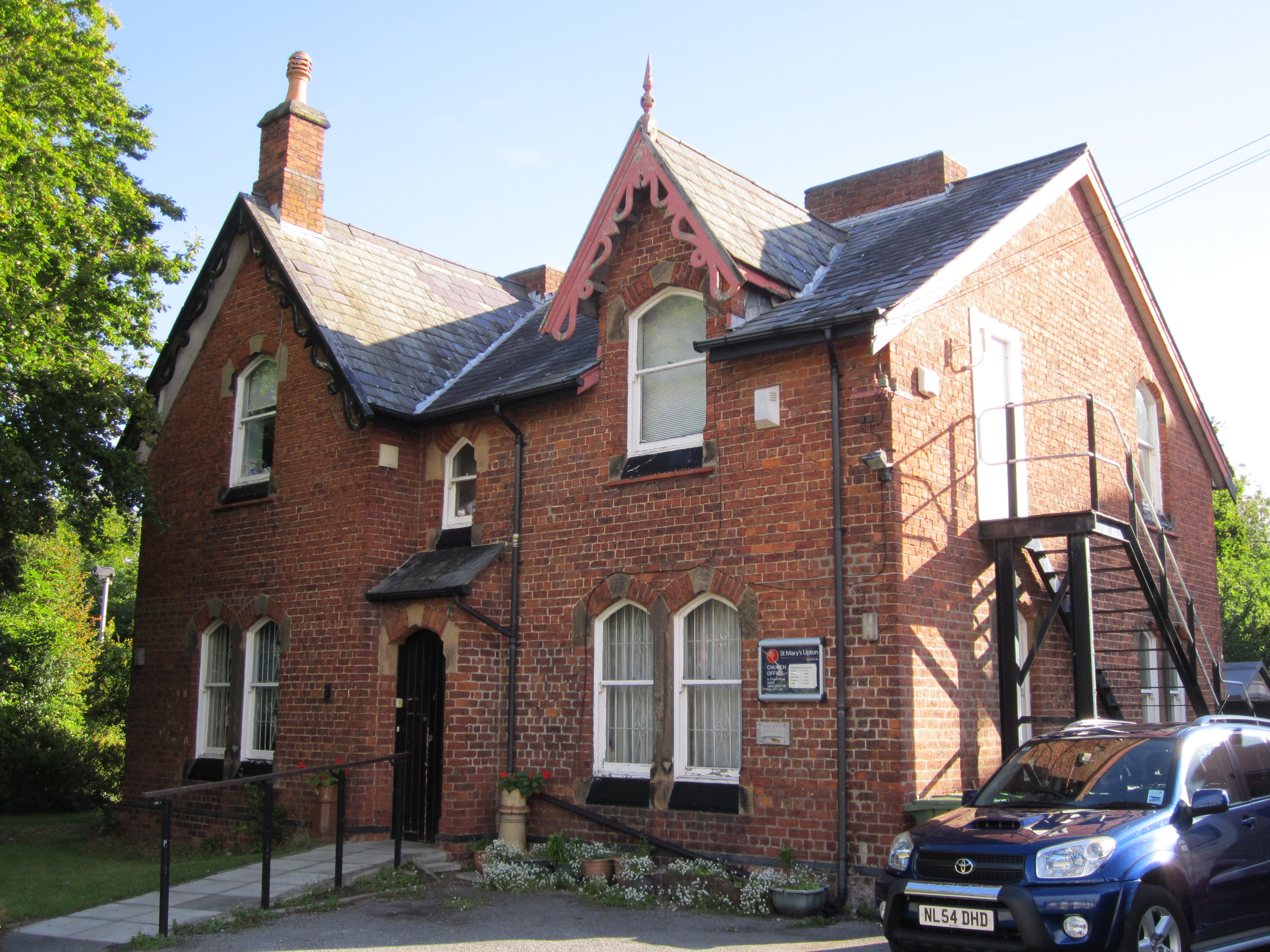
Holmleigh, Church Road.

St. Mary's Church is Upton's Church of England parish church. This is a large church, which was consecrated on 28 April 1868. The church had its own office and meeting room, situated in Holmleigh, which was next door to the church hall, on Church Road. Holmleigh was originally built by William Inman, for his estate bailiff, in 1869. The building was given to the church, in 1884, by another owner and became the vicarage in 1911. A new vicarage was built in 1928, further down Church Road, and the building was sold. However, the church repurchased Holmleigh in 1985, when the building acquired its present use. St. Mary's Church replaced Holmleigh and the church hall, with modern housing. This led to some opposition to the proposal.

St. Joseph's Church, the local Roman Catholic parish church, was opened on 31 August 1954. Upton's United Reformed Church was opened on 11 May 1900, with the final service held on 26 July 2015.

==== Former Churches and Religious Buildings ====
The original Norman church was a steepled church, of decorative design, and was situated opposite Upton Manor on Moreton Road. The earliest reference to the church is in 1347. The steeple was damaged by a storm in 1709 and, by 1813, the church was in such poor condition that it was petitioned to be demolished. The church is understood to have been built on the site of at least one previous Saxon church.

The 1837 tithe map of the area indicates a half-circle of standing stones, around a wooded hollow which was situated next to the church, at a diameter of 350 metres (380 yd). Although much detail is lost to history, this has raised the possibility that the site was once a stone circle and, therefore, a pre-Christian, Neolithic religious site.

Greenbank Church was built in 1813 and was situated closer to the centre of the village, next to Greasby Road. This church reused material from the former Norman church, though was of much simpler design. This church was used until the construction of St. Mary's and was later demolished. During which time, the Overchurch runic stone was discovered.

The priory was originally known as The Parsonage. This building was situated on Ford Road, was constructed before 1850, and was used as the vicarage until 1911. The building was quite large, with seven bedrooms. The building no longer stands, having been demolished in the 1950s. However, the wall and the walled-in gateway still remain, on Ford Road.

=== Leisure ===
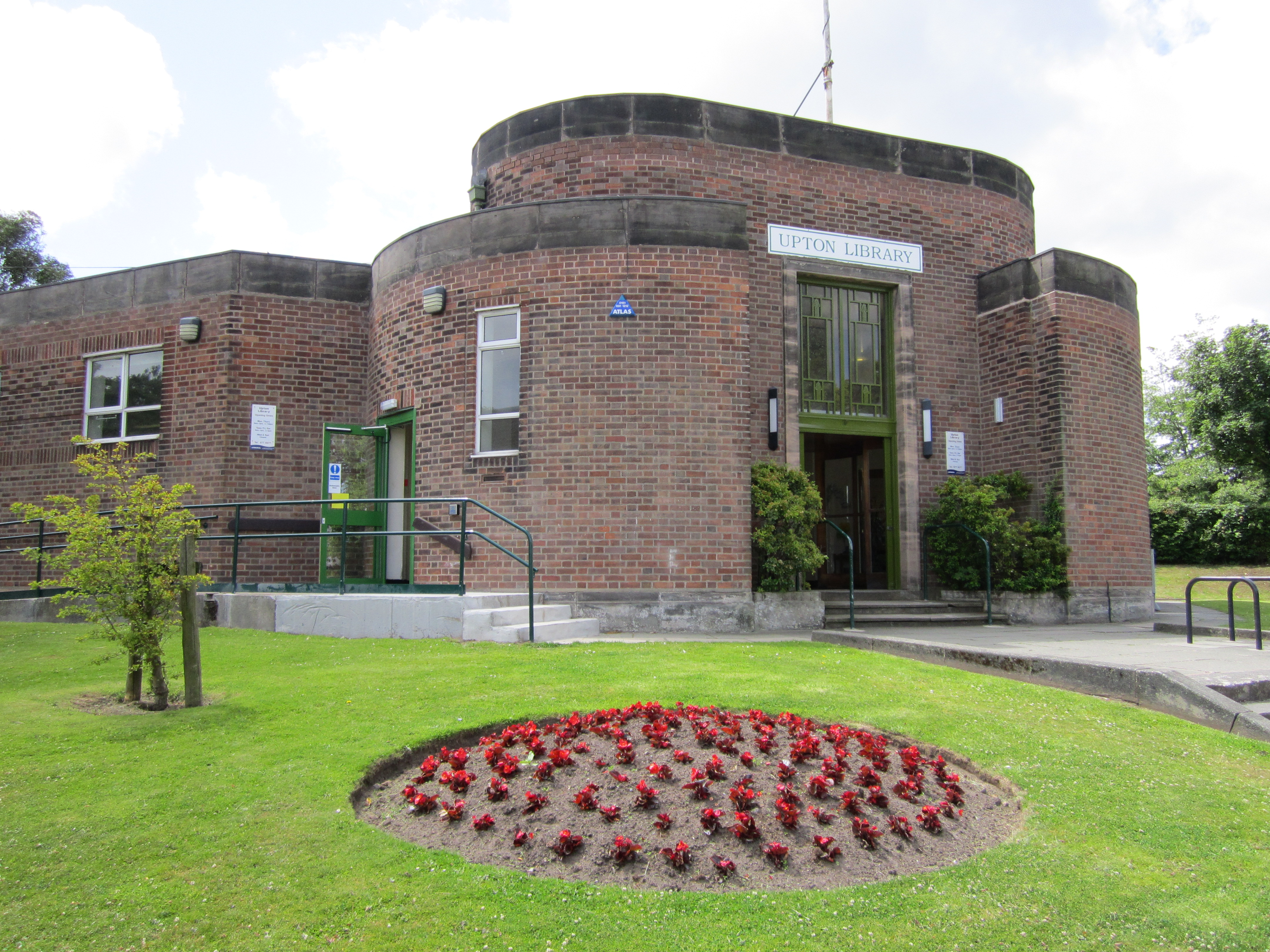
Upton Library.

Victory Hall, a community hall rebuilt in 1963, was originally sited in a large Victorian villa, which had been purchased by public subscription. Upton Library was opened in 1936 and built in the Art Deco style of architecture. The village's war memorial is located within its grounds.

The Village Youth Project, known as The Bank, is a youth club set up in 1999. This provides a range of activities for the youth of Upton. The club runs various events for the community, including a popular annual fair, situated at Overchurch Primary School each summer. The club also organises many residential visits to various parts of the United Kingdom.

Overchurch Upton Scout Group was formed in 1924, and is situated on Salacre Lane. The site of the scout hut was acquired after the 3rd World Scout Jamboree, held less than a mile away, in Arrowe Park, in 1929.

==== Historic public houses ====
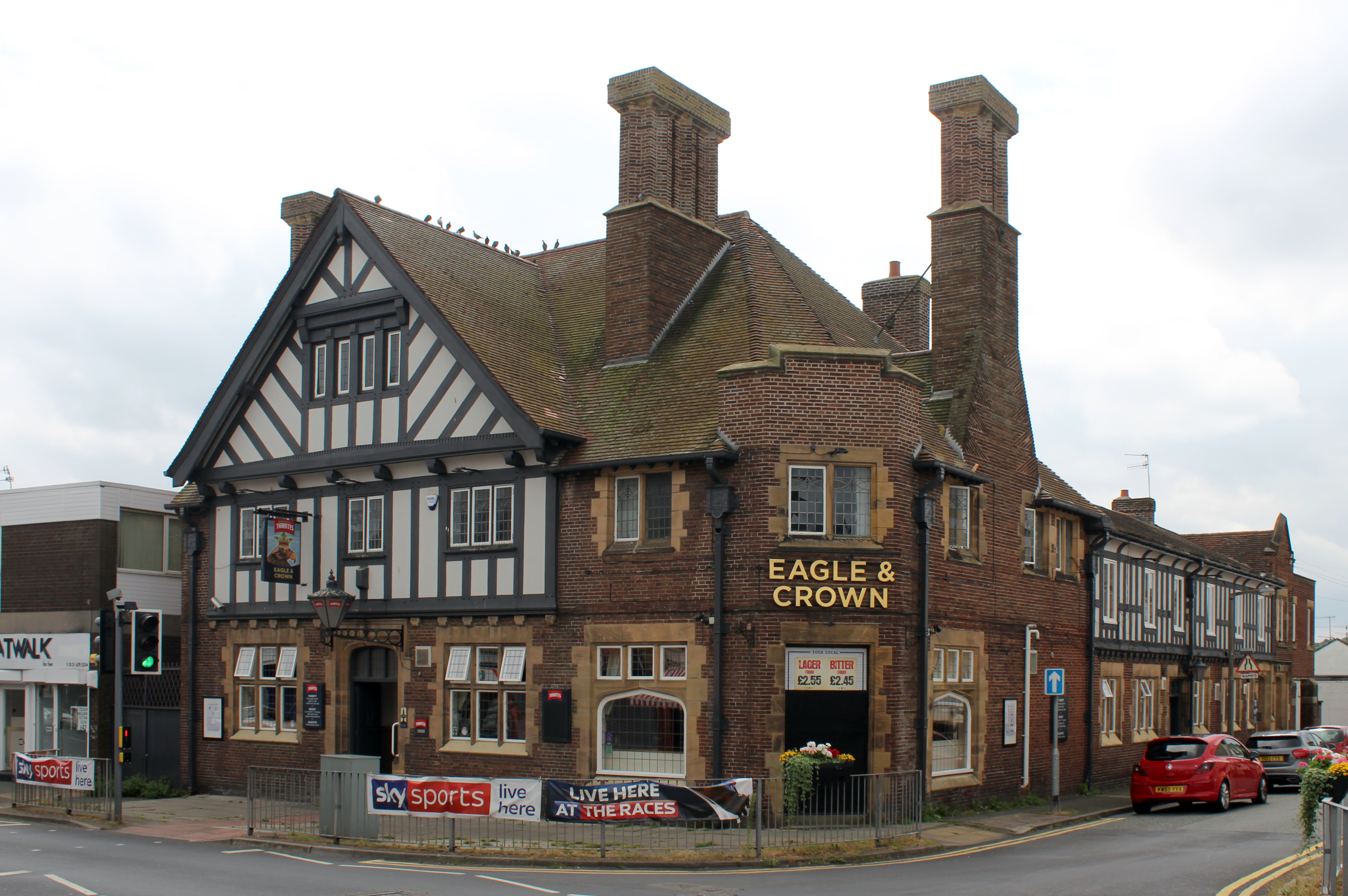
The Eagle and Crown.

The village has two historic public houses which are close to the centre. These are Eagle and Crown, built around 1840, and the Horse and Jockey. Built around 1850, the Horse and Jockey used to be situated opposite the Eagle and Crown and was owned by William Inman until 1875. The old Horse and Jockey building was demolished in the 1960s, before moving to new premises nearby. Meanwhile, the Overchurch Hotel and the Stirrup are situated away from the centre of the village. Upton also used to have a beer house known as The Traveller's Rest. This beer house closed in 1903, although the building remains.

==== Parks and Commons ====
Upton has a number of parks and commons, the largest of which is Arrowe Park, which is less than a mile from the centre of the village. This park is also home to Arrowe Park Hospital and was the location of the 3rd World Scout Jamboree, in 1929. The park is used, weekly, by amateur football teams playing against the Arrowe Park Blades FC and for the Wirral Radio Control Flying Society.

Upton Park is the second largest park in the area. This park is situated near to Upton Manor and next to the M53 motorway, on the border with Moreton. The park used to have a racecourse and was part of the property of Upton Manor. This park has an annual firework display, which is free, on Guy Fawkes Night.

Warwick Park is a small suburban park with an area of 31 acres (13 ha) and which is situated in Overchurch. This park has its own group of friends. The park was originally known as Warwick Hay. Overchurch Park is situated nearby to Warwick Park, and includes the site of the old Norman Church and graveyard, which have been scheduled as monuments by English Heritage.

Upton Meadow is a public common with a semi-natural woodland and 1.5 kilometres (0.93 mi) of footpaths. This area is bordered by Arrowe Brook and separates Upton from Greasby. Meanwhile, Salacre Common is also a public common, but somewhat smaller. Salacre common was originally the front garden of a large house and is the closest green space to the centre of the village.

=== Sport ===
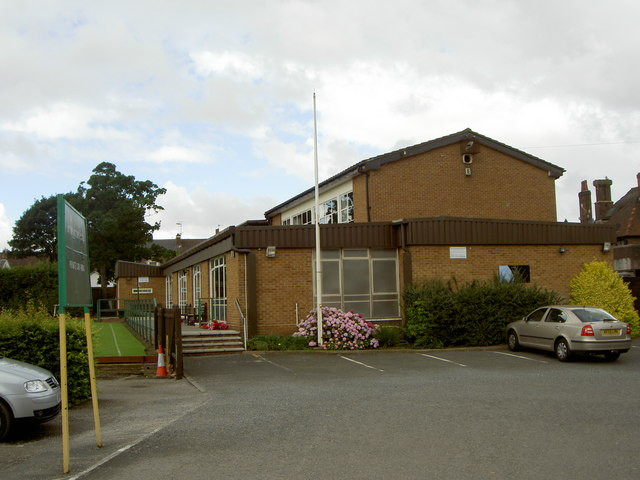
Victory Hall.

The village is represented in sport by Upton Cricket Club, which was established in 1901 by William Hannay, following a lease of land from Lord Leverhulme. The cricket club originally had its own tennis and football clubs. However, the tennis club had folded, on this site, by 1968.

Upton Victory Hall Lawn Tennis & Badminton Club was established in 1919, and was situated behind a large house on the corner of Salacre Lane, known as "The Elms". The Elms building was sold in 1963, and Victory Hall was built behind the house, before the house was demolished. The tennis club has four grass courts and four AstroTurf courts. The clubhouse is a separate building from Victory Hall, and has its own bar, function room and an entrance on Rake Lane. The sports club also provides facilities for croquet and bowls.

In football, Upton FC was founded in 1994, and has teams for both boys and girls of all abilities and ages from six onwards.

Upton Park is an area of recreational open space and woodland. The park was part of William Inman's Upton Manor estate and had included a racecourse between 1922 and 1924. Part of the Upton Park site is now the Moreton Spur road, connected to the M53 motorway.

== Transport ==
=== Roads ===
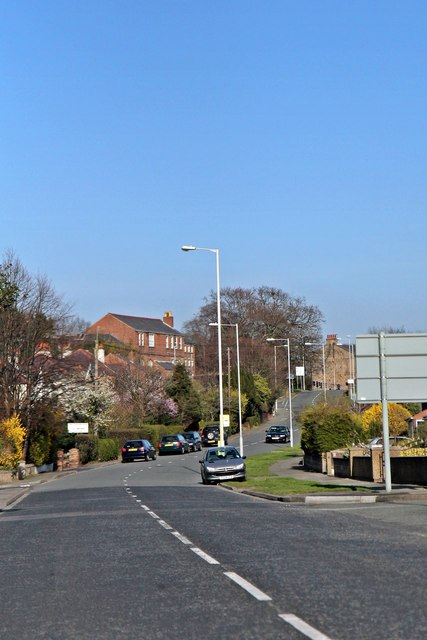
The B5139, Old Greasby Road, heading towards Upton village.

Upton today is most notable for its central location between Birkenhead and West Kirby. The consequence of this is that road transport through Upton is uncharacteristically efficient for the rural suburban area of Wirral. Upton is situated at the junction of roads from Birkenhead, Moreton (the A551), Greasby (the B5139), Saughall Massie and Arrowe Park (the A551). The road network was further enhanced with the building of a bypass (the A5027) in the early 1980s. The M53 motorway, at Junction 2, is situated less than a mile from the centre of the village and connects directly to the bypass.

=== Buses ===
The first bus to run from Upton village was a horse-drawn bus in 1891. This bus operated to Claughton Village. The first motorised Birkenhead Corporation bus worked on 14 July 1920. Until deregulation of the bus services in 1986, Upton was served by the Merseyside Passenger Transport Executive (MPTE) (the forerunner to Merseytravel) and by the separate operator, Crosville.

Present-day services are run primarily by Arriva, and are coordinated by Merseytravel. The village has bus stops along all four of the main roads entering the village. Merseytravel's daily "Saveaway" Area B and All Zones tickets are valid to use from any bus stop in Upton after 9:30am.

=== Railways ===
Upton is not part of the major electrified Merseyrail Wirral line from Birkenhead to West Kirby, which instead passes around the more densely populated coast. Upton railway station exists as part of the Borderlands line between Bidston and Wrexham and is operated by Transport for Wales, with a diesel service. However, the station is within the Merseytravel area. Journeys can be made from the station with a daily "Saveaway" ticket. This is reasonably priced and allows unlimited travel within the Merseytravel area for one day as far afield as Chester, Southport, Ormskirk and Newton-le-Willows, as well as Birkenhead and Liverpool. Because of where it is, the station is more useful to the Noctorum community, rather than Upton. This is not considered a problem however, as the locality is well served by regular bus services.

=== Cycling ===
National Cycle Route 56 passes along the eastern side of the village. This route goes from Chester to Liverpool via Leasowe and Seacombe and includes part of the Wirral Way, along its course.

== Notable people ==
The most notable person that lived in Upton was William Inman, who was the owner of the Inman Line of ships which operated from Liverpool to New York. The most notable person to have a connection with Upton is Dixie Dean, the professional footballer who holds the league record for the most goals scored in one season. Dixie Dean worked in Upton as a delivery boy. Athlete Andrew Baddeley, who is an English middle distance runner who competed in the 2008 Beijing Olympics and the 2012 London Olympics, was born in Upton. Danny Harrison, an English footballer who previously played for both Tranmere Rovers and Chester, has also lived in Upton. BBC journalist Sally Nugent was educated at Upton Hall School and is a sports presenter on BBC Breakfast. Berlie Doherty is an English writer who was also educated at Upton Hall School. A former teacher from the same school, Angela Topping, is also an English writer. Opera singer Joan Carlyle was born in Upton. Chris Shaw is an English synthpop musician from Upton. In religion, notable Anglican priests, who have both been incumbent at St. Mary's Church, are Cecil Druitt and George Aickin.

== See also ==
- Listed buildings in Upton, Merseyside

== Bibliography ==
- Boumphrey, Ian; Boumphrey, Marilyn (1992). Yesterday's Wirral. Ian & Marilyn Boumphrey. ISBN 0-9507255-7-9. pp53–64.
- Rubery, Jim (2003). The Wirral ~ Photographic Memories. Francis Frith Collection. ISBN 1-85937-517-0. pp111–113.
- Swan, David (Summer 2004). "Upton Memories". Wirral Champion Journal. 12 (2). ISSN 1470-2746. pp49–53.
- Lysons, Rev. Daniel (1810). Magna Britannia Vol.2, Pt.2 The County Palatine of Chester. London: Printed for T. Cadell & W. Davies. p.721.
- Irvine, Wm. Fergusson (1900). The Registers of Upton in Overchurch, Cheshire, 1600–1812. London: Privately printed for the Parish Register Society.
- Pevsner, Nikolaus; Hubbard, Edward (1971). Cheshire. The Buildings of England. Penguin. pp. 104–105. ISBN 9780140710427. OCLC 521341.
- Pullen, Robert; Burnley, Kenneth (1993). Set Upon a Hill: The Story of St. Mary's Church and Parish. Upton, Wirral. Wallasey: Eaton Press.
- Randall, David (1984). The Search for Old Wirral. Countryvise. ISBN 9780907768807. OCLC 263480984.
- Mortimer, William Williams (1847). The History of the Hundred of Wirral. London: Whittaker & Co. pp248–249.
