= The Birket =

River in Wirral, England

Coordinates: 53.4112°N 3.1168°W

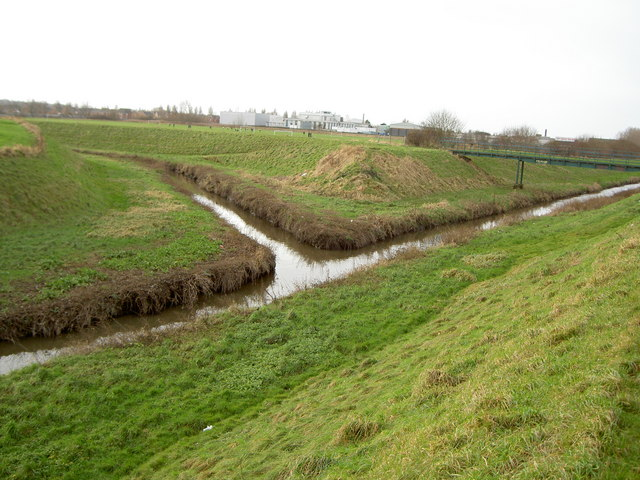
The confluence of the Birket and Fender at Leasowe.

The Birket is a tributary of the River Mersey, on the Wirral, Merseyside. The watercourse starts as lowland field drainage south of Hoylake and flows along to the south of Meols. Arrowe Brook joins at Moreton, and the Fender joins at Leasowe. The Birket discharges into the West Float at the site of the former Wallasey Pool. It is about 8 miles (13 km) long.

The Birket was recorded by Ordnance Survey, around 1842.

== Tributaries ==
- River Fender (R)
  - Prenton Brook (L)
- Arrowe Brook (R)
  - Greasby Brook (L)
    - Newton Brook (L)

=== Fender ===
The River Fender starts as field drainage between Prenton and Storeton, before shortly joining with Prenton Brook. The river flows between the Borderlands railway line and the M53 motorway, between Prenton and Upton, and then alongside the M53, to Leasowe. The Fender then joins the Birket at Leasowe.

=== Arrowe Brook ===
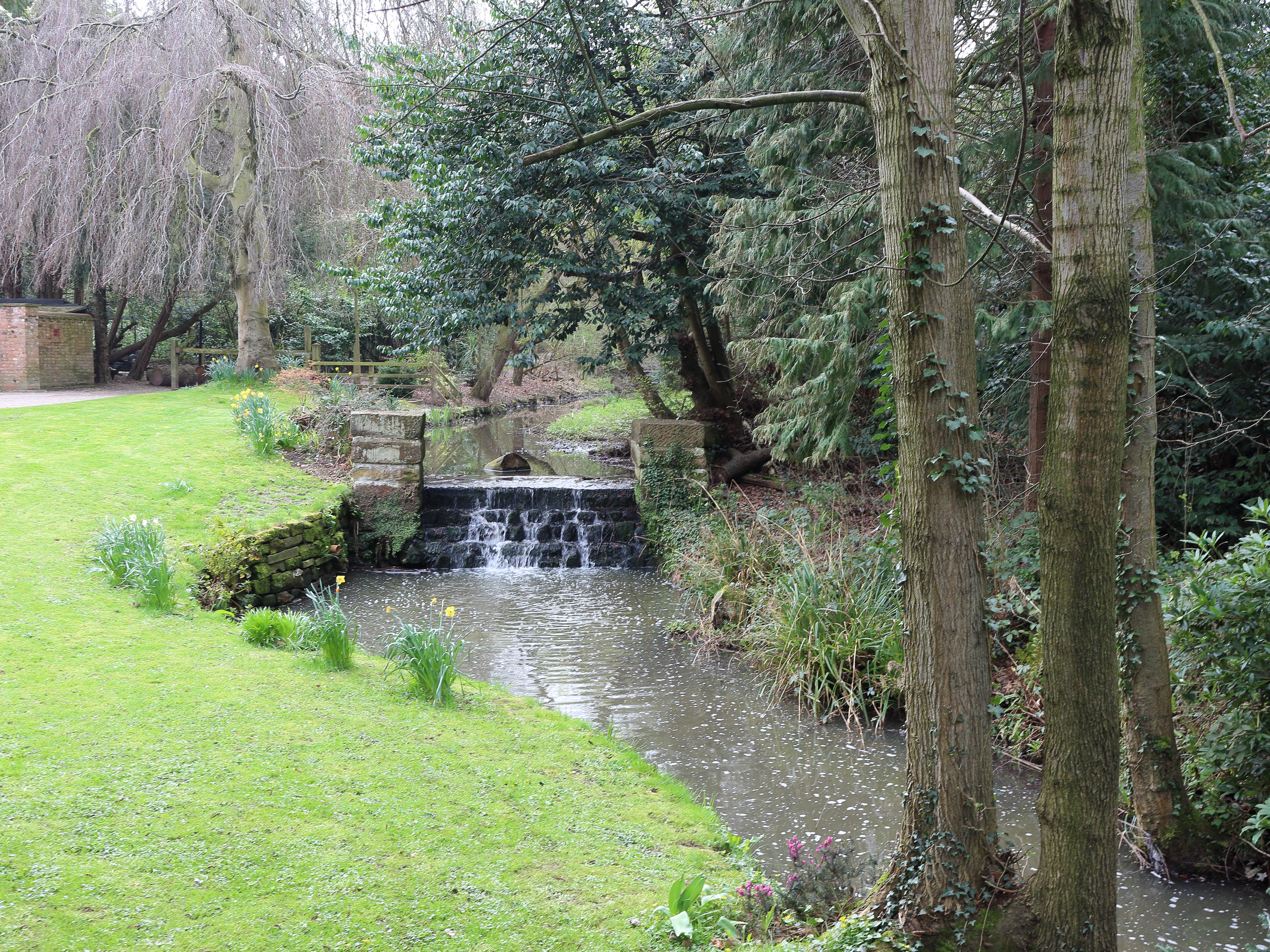
Arrowe Brook at Arrowe Park.

Arrowe Brook starts as lowland field drainage around Irby, Thingwall and Landican. The brook flows through Arrowe Park, Upton Meadow and Greasby, before Greasby Brook converges between Greasby and Saughall Massie. Arrowe Brook then goes beneath Saughall Massie bridge. This was the first bridge constructed by the notable Victorian civil engineer Sir Thomas Brassey, in 1829. The bridge was awarded Grade II listed status by English Heritage, in 2007. The brook then continues, to join the Birket at Moreton.
