= Frankby =

Village in Wirral, England

Coordinates: 53.3724°N 3.1364°W

- Village
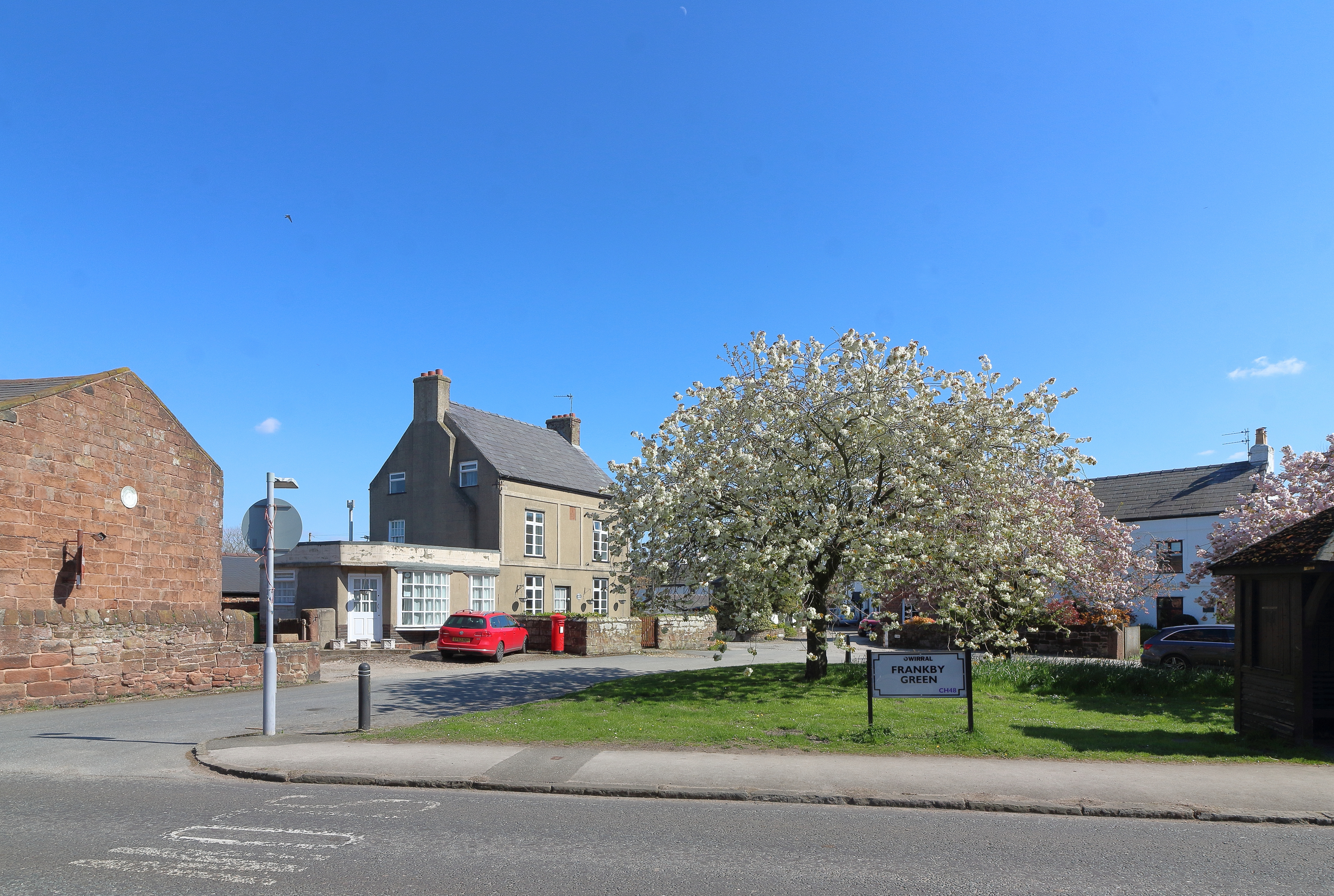
- Frankby Green

- Location within Merseyside
- Population: 310 (2001 census)
- OS grid reference: SJ245868
  - London: 181 mi (291 km) SE
- Metropolitan borough: Wirral
- Metropolitan county: Merseyside
- Region: North West
- Country: England
- Sovereign state: United Kingdom
- Post town: WIRRAL
- Postcode district: CH48
- Dialling code: 0151
- ISO 3166 code: GB-WRL
- Police: Merseyside
- Fire: Merseyside
- Ambulance: North West
- UK Parliament: Wirral West

Frankby (locally /ˈfræŋkbi/) is a village and former civil parish, in the Wirral district, in Merseyside, England. It is located on the Wirral Peninsula between Greasby and Newton on the outskirts of the town of West Kirby and south of Hoylake. The hamlet of Larton is to the north west. Historically within the county of Cheshire, it is part of the Greasby, Frankby and Irby Ward and is in the parliamentary constituency of Wirral West.

According to the 2001 census, of a total ward population of 14,667, 310 people live in Frankby. In the 2011 census, population figures specific to Frankby were not available. However, the total population of Greasby, Frankby and Irby Ward was 13,991.

== History ==
The name Frankby come from the Old Norse Frankis-býr, likely referring to "Frank's/Franki's (Frenchman's) farm or settlement". Although it could also be interpreted as a personal name. The "býr" suffix, included in neighbouring place names such as Greasby, Irby and Pensby, applies to settlements believed to be Viking in origin.

The settlement of Frankby was supposedly mentioned in the Domesday Book entry for neighbouring Greasby. Eight households are recorded: "3 villagers. 1 smallholder. 2 slaves. 2 Frenchmen."

The name has been variously spelt over time as Frankeby (1230), Fraunkbi (1346) and Fraunkeley (1421).

=== Civic history ===
Frankby was formerly a township and chapelry in the West Kirby parish of the Wirral Hundred. From 1866 Frankby was a civil parish in its own right, on 1 April 1974 the parish was abolished. From 1866 Frankby was part of Wirral Rural Sanitary District, which was replaced in 1894 by Wirral Rural District. In 1933 the village transferred to Hoylake Urban District. On 1 April 1974, local government reorganisation in England and Wales resulted in most of the Wirral Peninsula, including Frankby, transfer from the county of Cheshire to Merseyside.

The population of the village was 90 in 1801, 138 in 1851, 248 in 1901 and 413 in 1951.

== Geography ==
Frankby is in the north-western part of the Wirral Peninsula, approximately 3.5 km (2.2 mi) south-south-east of the Irish Sea at Meols, 3.5 km (2.2 mi) east of the Dee Estuary at West Kirby and 9 km (5.6 mi) west-south-west of the River Mersey at Seacombe. Frankby is situated to the north of Thurstaston Hill, with the centre of the village at an elevation of 31 m (102 ft) above sea level.

Newton Brook joins with Greasby Brook to the north of the village.

== Governance ==
The village is within the parliamentary constituency of Wirral West. The current Member of Parliament is Margaret Greenwood, a Labour representative who has held the seat since 2015.

At local government level, Greasby is incorporated into the Greasby, Frankby and Irby Ward of the Metropolitan Borough of Wirral, in the metropolitan county of Merseyside. It is represented on Wirral Borough Council by three councillors. The most recent local elections took place on 6 May 2021.

== Community ==
Frankby contains part of Royden Park with its miniature railway and meres. Named after local landowner Sir Ernest Royden, the park is jointly owned by the National Trust and Wirral Borough Council.

Frankby's local public house, dating back to at least 1865, is known as the 'Farmer's Arms'.

In the village of Frankby lies 1st Frankby Greasby Scout headquarters. In 1929, the year of the 3rd World Scout Jamboree held at Arrowe Park, the Royden family donated a strip of land to the group (then known as 1st Frankby). The group amalgamated with 1st Greasby in May 1946 to become 1st Frankby Greasby.

== Landmarks ==
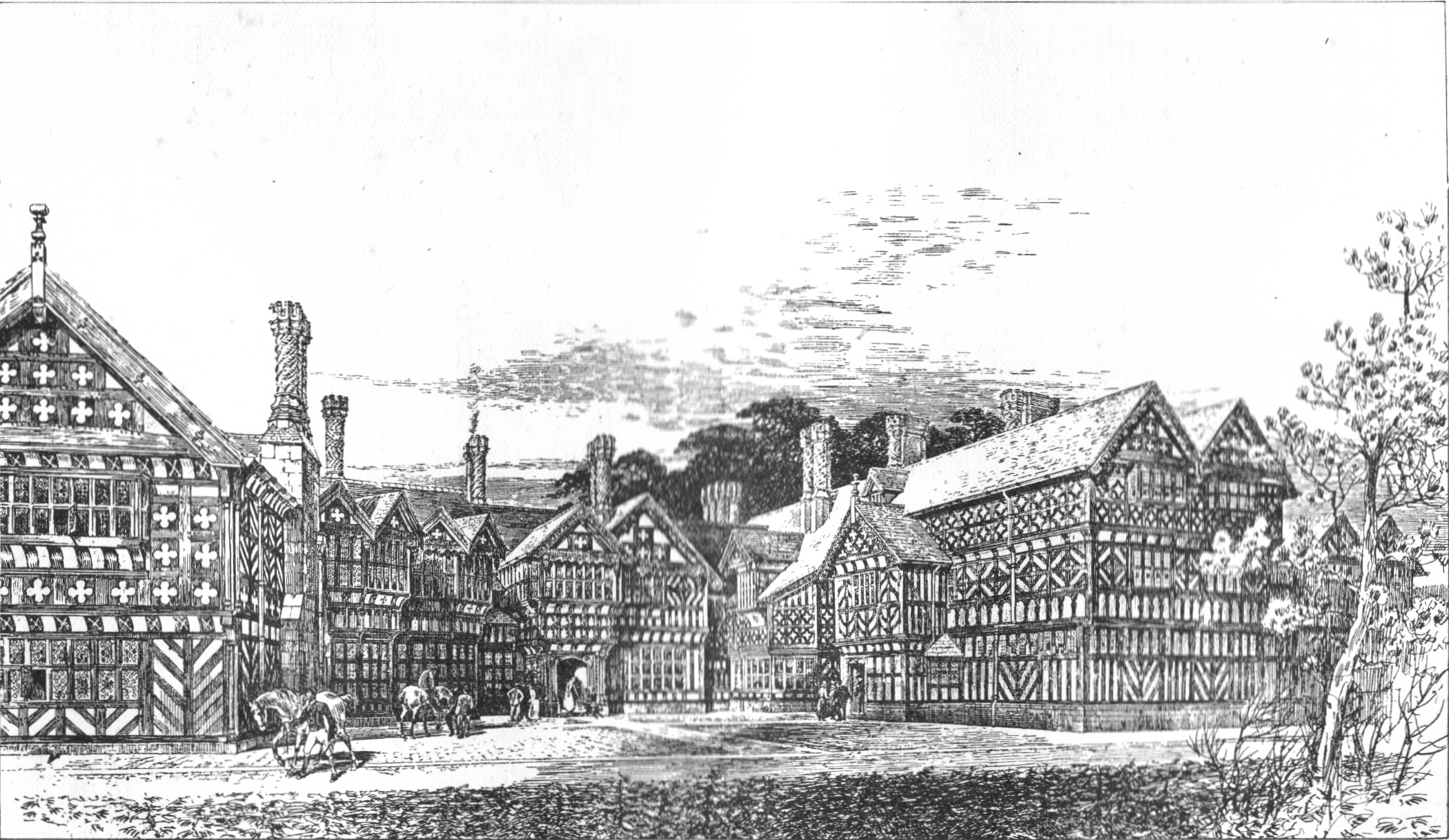
Bidston Court, a drawing by T. Raffles Davison circa 1909

Within the grounds of Royden Park is a large Mock Tudor house known as 'Hill Bark', which was re-erected between 1929 and 1931 by Sir Ernest Royden. Originally named 'Bidston Court', it was initially sited near Bidston Hill in 1891, but moved brick by brick to its present position in Frankby to replace an earlier dwelling. The house contains a 16th-century fireplace, once part of a house belonging to Sir Walter Raleigh. The building was given Grade II* listed status in 1963. As of 2026 it is known as the 'Hillbark Hotel'.

== Notable people ==
Sir Thomas Royden was an English shipowner and Conservative Party politician. He was created a baronet in 1905 and lived at 'Hill Bark' whilst his wife's parents lived at Frankby Hall. His daughter, the writer, preacher, suffragist and former local inhabitant Maude Royden (1876–1956) is buried in the local Church of St John the Divine.

== See also ==
- Listed buildings in Hoylake

== Bibliography ==
- Mortimer, William Williams (1847). The History of the Hundred of Wirral. London: Whittaker & Co. pp273-274.
