= Larton =

Hamlet in Wirral, England

Coordinates: 53.374°N 3.147°W

- Hamlet
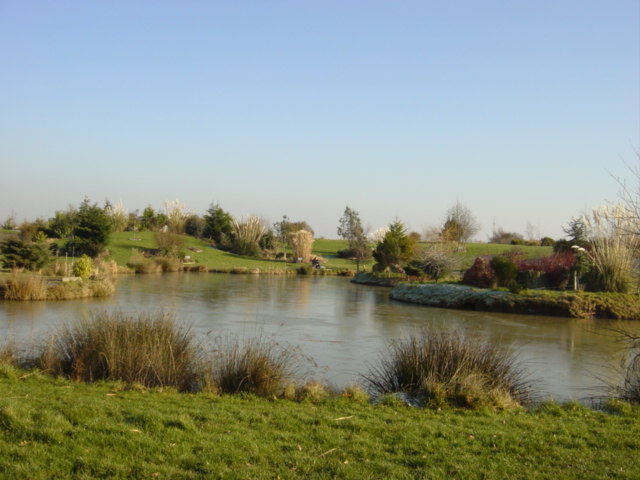
- Man-made fishing pond, Larton

- Location within Merseyside
- OS grid reference: SJ238871
  - London: 181 mi (291 km) SE
- Metropolitan borough: Wirral
- Metropolitan county: Merseyside
- Region: North West
- Country: England
- Sovereign state: United Kingdom
- Post town: WIRRAL
- Postcode district: CH48
- Dialling code: 0151
- ISO 3166 code: GB-WRL
- Police: Merseyside
- Fire: Merseyside
- Ambulance: North West
- UK Parliament: Wirral West

Larton is a hamlet near the town of West Kirby, on the Wirral Peninsula, in Merseyside, England. Administratively it is part of the local government ward of Greasby, Frankby and Irby in the Metropolitan Borough of Wirral and is within the parliamentary constituency of Wirral West.

Larton is located to the north west of the village of Frankby and east of Newton, to which it was historically linked as a combined township. Although Newton contains the majority of the former township's population, Larton's name remains in geographical use with the Larton Livery riding school, Larton Farm and a "state of the art" veterinary surgery.

== History ==
The name is of Viking origin, deriving from the Old Norse Leir-tún, meaning "clay farmstead".

Larton was previously combined with the nearby hamlet of Newton as Newton cum Larton, part of West Kirby parish of the Wirral Hundred, in the county of Cheshire. Its population was 49 in 1801 and 44 in 1851. A civil parish from 1866, it was abolished in 1889 and subsumed into the nearby civil parish of Grange. The population of the former Newton cum Larton civil parish had risen to 66 by 1891. Between 1894 and 1933 Larton was part of Wirral Rural District, then Hoylake Urban District until 1974.

== Geography ==
Larton lies on the western side of the Wirral Peninsula, approximately 3.5 km (2.2 mi) south-east of the Irish Sea at Hoylake, 2.5 km (1.6 mi) north-east of the Dee Estuary at West Kirby and about 9 km (5.6 mi) west-south-west of the River Mersey at Seacombe. The hamlet is situated at an elevation of about 20 m (66 ft) above sea level.

To the immediate north of Larton is the site of RAF West Kirby. Newton Brook joins with Greasby Brook to the north-east of the hamlet.
