= Saughall Massie =

Village on the Wirral Peninsula, Merseyside, England

Coordinates: 53.39°N 3.12°W

- Village
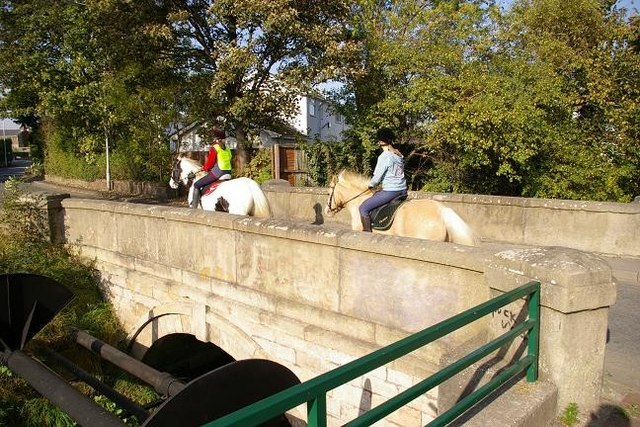
- The Grade II listed Saughall Massie Bridge over Arrowe Brook, built in 1829 by Sir Thomas Brassey

- Location within Merseyside
- Population: 1,260 (2001 Census)
- OS grid reference: SJ247882
  - London: 181 mi (291 km) SE
- Metropolitan borough: Wirral
- Metropolitan county: Merseyside
- Region: North West
- Country: England
- Sovereign state: United Kingdom
- Post town: WIRRAL
- Postcode district: CH49
- Dialling code: 0151
- ISO 3166 code: GB-WRL
- Police: Merseyside
- Fire: Merseyside
- Ambulance: North West
- UK Parliament: Wallasey

Saughall Massie (/ˈsɒɡɔːl ˈmæsi/) is a village on the Wirral Peninsula, Merseyside, England. It is part of the Moreton West & Saughall Massie Ward of the Metropolitan Borough of Wirral and the parliamentary constituency of Wallasey. A small village primarily made up of large fields owned by local farmers, it is bordered by Greasby, Meols, Moreton and Upton. At the 2001 census Saughall Massie had a population of 1,260.

== History ==
The Saughall part of the name has been recorded as deriving from salh and halh, meaning a place where sallows or willow shrubs grew or "Willow tree nook of land". Over the years the name has been spelt as: Saligh (1249); Salghale (1309); Salgham (1385); Saughoughe (1546). The name de Massie, de Massey or de Mascy has been connected to the Wirral since the time of the Norman Conquest. Baron Hamon de Mascey, whose family came from the settlement of Mascey near Avranches, Normandy, established Birkenhead Priory in 1150. His relations, the Masseys of Sale, settled on the Wirral during the reign of King John were supposed to have given their name to the village.

Formerly a township in the Bidston parish of the Wirral Hundred, Saughall Massie became a civil parish in 1866. The population of Saughall Massie and the nearby hamlet of Carr Houses was 98 in 1801, 176 in 1851, 186 in 1901 and 749 in 1931. The parish was abolished on 1 April 1933 and merged with Grange and Wallasey. On 1 April 1974, local government reorganisation in England and Wales resulted in most of Wirral, including Saughall Massie, transfer from the county of Cheshire to Merseyside.

As with several other agricultural settlements on the Wirral Peninsula, a timber peg mill once existed nearby. Saughall Massie's windmill was built circa 1580 to grind grain. It was demolished by 1875.

=== USAAF plane crash ===
On January 9, 1944 Lieutenant Jay Frederick Simpson, an American pilot from Gillett, Wisconsin was killed whilst test flying a Republic P-47 Thunderbolt (serial no. 42-75584) over Moreton. The plane had taken off from the US Burtonwood Airbase in Lancashire earlier. It flew out to sea and on its return over Hoylake he reported that the plane was on fire. It circled over the RAF West Kirby and was seen to lose height and flip over, and crash in a field near the Arrowe Brook south of the village. Pieces were dug up in 1974 and now reside in the museum of the War Plane Wreck Investigation Group at Fort Perch Rock, New Brighton. A small memorial plaque was unveiled on 21 March 2005 on the bridge across the Arrowe Brook on Saughall Massie Road overlooking the crash site.

== Geography ==
Saughall Massie is in the northern part of the Wirral Peninsula, approximately 2.5 km (1.6 mi) south-east of the Irish Sea at Meols, about 4.5 km (2.8 mi) east of the Dee Estuary at West Kirby and about 7 km (4.3 mi) west of the River Mersey at Seacombe. The hamlet is situated at an elevation of around 15 m (49 ft) above sea level.

Greasby Brook converges with Arrowe Brook to the south-west of Saughall Massie.

== Governance ==
Saughall Massie is part of the Metropolitan Borough of Wirral, in the metropolitan county of Merseyside. The settlement is part of the parliamentary constituency of Wallasey. The current Member of Parliament is Angela Eagle, a Labour representative, who has been the MP since 1992.

The area is also part of a local government ward of the Metropolitan Borough of Wirral, this being Moreton West and Saughall Massie Ward. Saughall Massie is represented on Wirral Metropolitan Borough Council by three Conservative councillors. The most recent local elections took place on 6 May 2021.

== Landmarks ==
The village consists of a number of historic buildings dating from the seventeenth century. In order to help preserve its historic and agricultural characteristics, Saughall Massie was designated a conservation area in January 1974.

Saughall Massie Bridge is a single span, single carriageway bridge over Arrowe Brook. It was built from sandstone for £200 in 1829. This was the first bridge constructed by notable Victorian civil engineer Sir Thomas Brassey at the beginning of his career. The bridge was awarded Grade II listed status by English Heritage in 2006.

== Transport ==
=== Road ===
The B5192 Saughall Massie Road, which heads west to Grange, is the main thoroughfare through Saughall Massie. The B5192 also connects to the A5027 Upton Bypass bordering to the east, the latter joining Junction 2 of the M53 motorway just to the north-east of Saughall Massie.

=== Rail ===
Saughall Massie is equidistant to both Moreton and Meols railway stations on the Wirral Line of the Merseyrail network. Saughall Massie is also a similar distance from Upton railway station on the Borderlands Line, operated by Transport for Wales.

== See also ==
- Saughall, a village in the Cheshire West and Chester area of Cheshire.
- Listed buildings in Saughall Massie

== Bibliography ==
- Mortimer, William Williams (1847). The History of the Hundred of Wirral. London: Whittaker & Co. p.206.
