= Newton Brook =

Brook in Wirral, England

Coordinates: 53.3758°N 3.1529°W

Newton Brook is a tributary of Greasby Brook, in Wirral, Merseyside. The brook starts as two branches, one of which is in the same system of lowland field drainage, south of Hoylake, as the Birket. The other branch begins in Caldy. The two branches join just to the west of Larton. Newton Brook then joins with Greasby Brook, to the north-east of Larton and north of Frankby. Greasby Brook then merges with Arrowe Brook, which, in turn, merges with the Birket. The Birket discharges into the West Float at the site of the former Wallasey Pool. Newton Brook is about 2 miles (3.2 km) long.
