= Greasby =

Town in Wirral, England

Coordinates: 53.373°N 3.1233°W

- Village
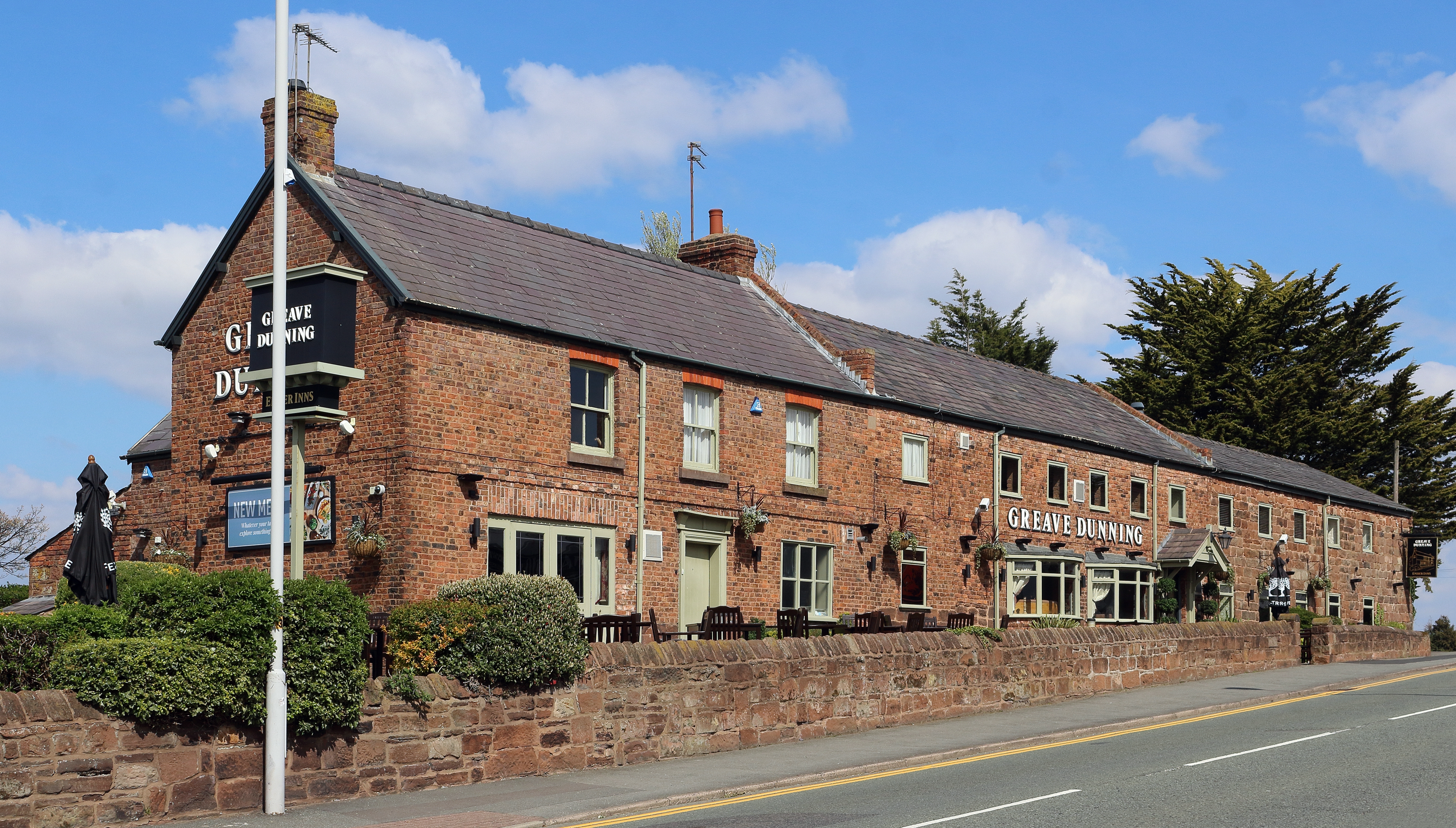
- The Greave Dunning public house, Greasby Road

- Location within Merseyside
- Population: 9,175 (2025 census)
- OS grid reference: SJ253868
  - London: 181 mi (291 km) SE
- Metropolitan borough: Wirral
- Metropolitan county: Merseyside
- Region: North West
- Country: England
- Sovereign state: United Kingdom
- Post town: WIRRAL
- Postcode district: CH49
- Dialling code: 0151
- ISO 3166 code: GB-WRL
- Police: Merseyside
- Fire: Merseyside
- Ambulance: North West
- UK Parliament: Wirral West

Greasby (locally /ˈɡriːzbi/) is a large village on the Wirral Peninsula, Merseyside, England. A predominantly residential area, it is contiguous with Upton to the east and Saughall Massie to the north. The small village of Frankby is to the immediate west. Historically within the county of Cheshire, it is part of the Greasby, Frankby and Irby Ward of the Metropolitan Borough of Wirral and is in the parliamentary constituency of Wirral West.

At the 2001 census, Greasby had 9,830 inhabitants, with the total population of the ward at 14,667. In the 2011 census the population of Greasby was not measured. However the total population of Greasby, Frankby and Irby Ward was 13,991.

== History ==
The earliest known human settlement in Merseyside has been found at Greasby, believed to date from approximately 7000 BC. A rectangular floor of sandstone slabs and pebbles suggests regular use by the nomadic hunters of that period. The remains of burnt hazelnut shells found at the site were used for radiocarbon dating. The results specified a time period between 8300 BC and 8500 BC, even earlier than previously thought. National Museums Liverpool archaeologists excavated the site between 1987 and 1990.

Greasby was an Anglo Saxon settlement, as witnessed by the form of the name, Gravesberie, in the Domesday Book. Gravesberie derives from the Old English gräf (a grove) and burh (a fortified place). This has been recorded as meaning "grove farm/settlement", or alternatively, a "stronghold or fortification by a grove, trench, canal or wood". The name was Scandinavianised to Greasby, under the influence of Old Norse speakers in Wirral (gräf and býr, with býr meaning "settlement" or "farmstead"). The name of the village has been variously spelt over time, including: Grauesberi, Grauesbyri, Grauisby (1093), Grauesbi (c.1155), Grauesby (c.1170), Griseby (1280) and Graysby (1610).

Before the Norman conquest of England in 1066, Greasby was owned by a man named Dunning, who may have been an official (bailiff or steward) for the earls of Mercia. After the invasion, all land in the area passed to Hugh d'Avranches. By the time of the Domesday Book (1086), Greasby was under the ownership of Nigel de Burcy and consisted of eight households.

After the Second World War the area expanded considerably, with significant residential development across previously agricultural land. This has resulted in Greasby becoming contiguous with the nearby settlements of Moreton, Upton and Woodchurch.

=== Civic history ===
Greasby was formerly a township split between the parishes of Thurstaston and West Kirby, within the Wirral Hundred. It held civil parish status between 1866 and 1974. From 1866 Greasby was part of Wirral Rural Sanitary District, which was replaced in 1894 by Wirral Rural District. In 1933 the village transferred to Hoylake Urban District. On 1 April 1974 the parish was abolished and local government reorganisation in England and Wales resulted in most of the Wirral Peninsula, including Greasby, transfer from the county of Cheshire to Merseyside.

The population of the township/parish was 123 in 1801, rising to 177 in 1851, 290 in 1901 and significantly increasing to 4,367 in 1951.

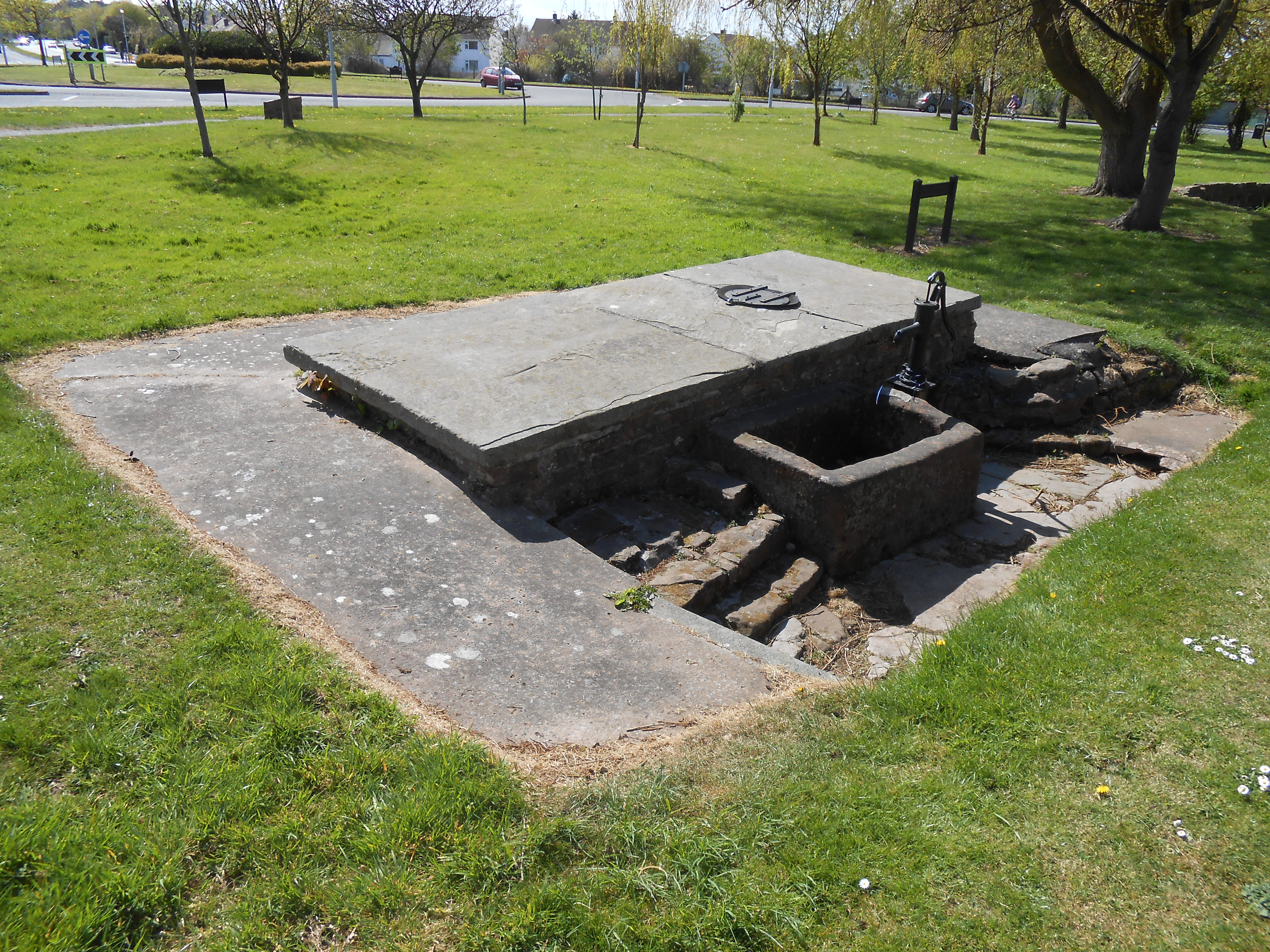
The restored pump, on the corner of Pump Lane

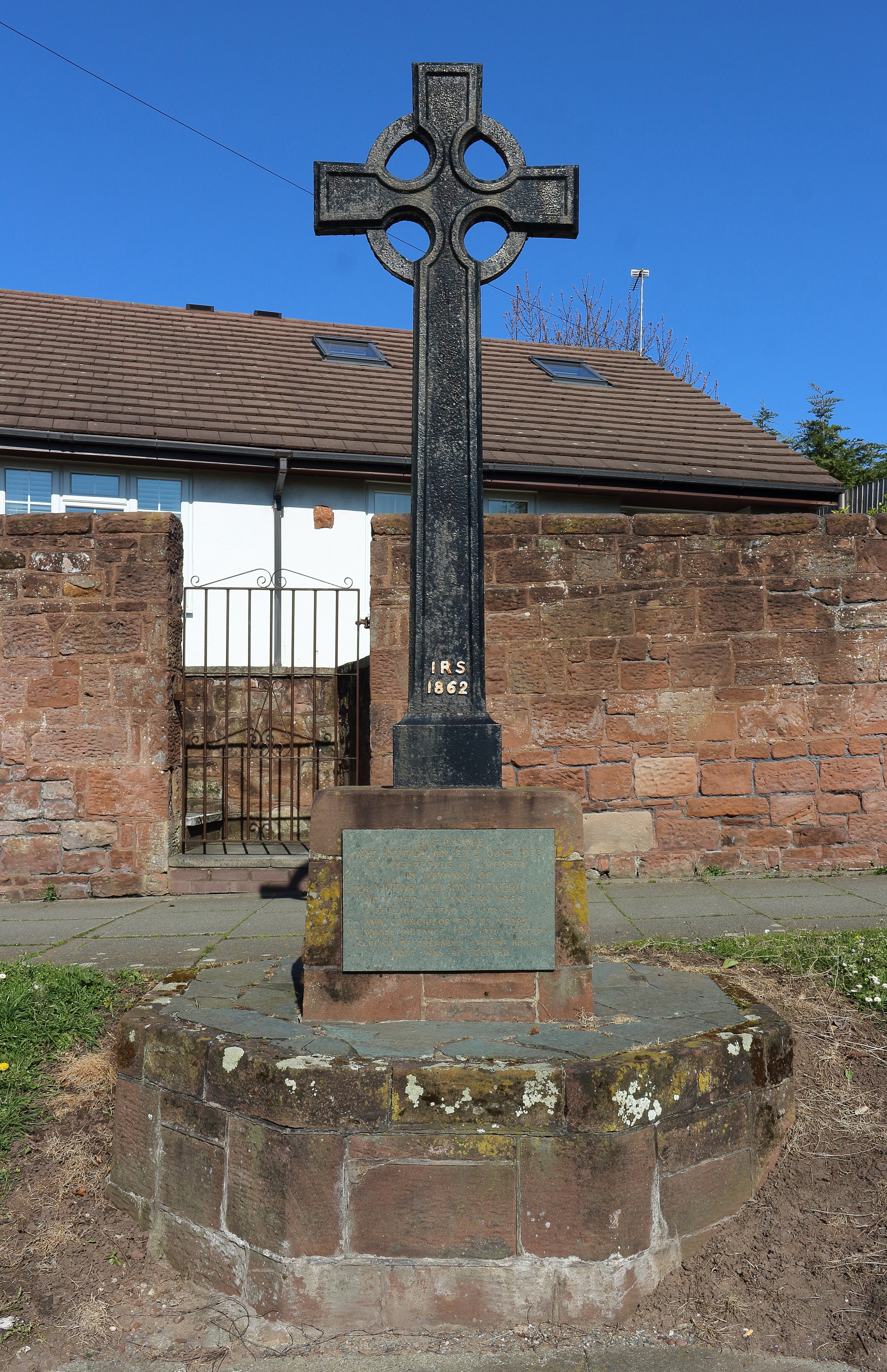
Greasby Cross, 19th century replacement for an ancient stone cross

== Geography ==
Greasby is bounded by Arrowe Brook, at Upton Meadow, and by Greasby Brook which flows around the western and northern sides of Greasby. Greasby Brook merges into Arrowe Brook between Greasby and Saughall Massie, which becomes a tributary of the Birket.

== Landmarks ==
Greasby Cross is an iron cross on a sandstone plinth that was placed in the centre of the village in 1862 to replicate an earlier, possibly medieval, cross on the same site. A restored late nineteenth century water pump is on Old Pump Lane.

Greasby Old Hall on Frankby Road has been a Grade II listed building since 1953. It is a seventeenth century sandstone house, although remnants of a possibly fifteenth century timber structure survive within.

Manor Farm is a red sandstone and brick building with associated barns and are all Grade II listed buildings. Manor Farm has a date stone inscription of "IM 1680" and has been previously known as Greasby House and The Manor.

== Governance ==
The village is within the parliamentary constituency of Wirral West. It is currently represented by Labour Member of Parliament Matthew Patrick.

At local government level, Greasby is incorporated into the Greasby, Frankby and Irby Ward of the Metropolitan Borough of Wirral, in the metropolitan county of Merseyside. It is represented on Wirral Metropolitan Borough Council by three councillors. The most recent local elections took place on 6 May 2021.

== Community ==
=== Schools ===
The village has four primary schools: Greasby Infant School, Greasby Junior School, Our Lady of Pity Primary School and Brookdale Primary School.

=== Churches ===
Greasby has three churches: St. Nicholas' Church of England, the Our Lady Of Pity Catholic Church, and Greasby Methodist Church.

=== Leisure ===
The village has a library and a community centre. They are centrally situated and close together, along with the health centre. The Greasby Centre is a purpose-built single-storey building which has two halls. This was built as Greasby Community Centre in 1984, and replaced an older building on Arrowe Road. The 2nd Greasby Scout Group is also within the village, having been established in 1954.

==== Public houses ====
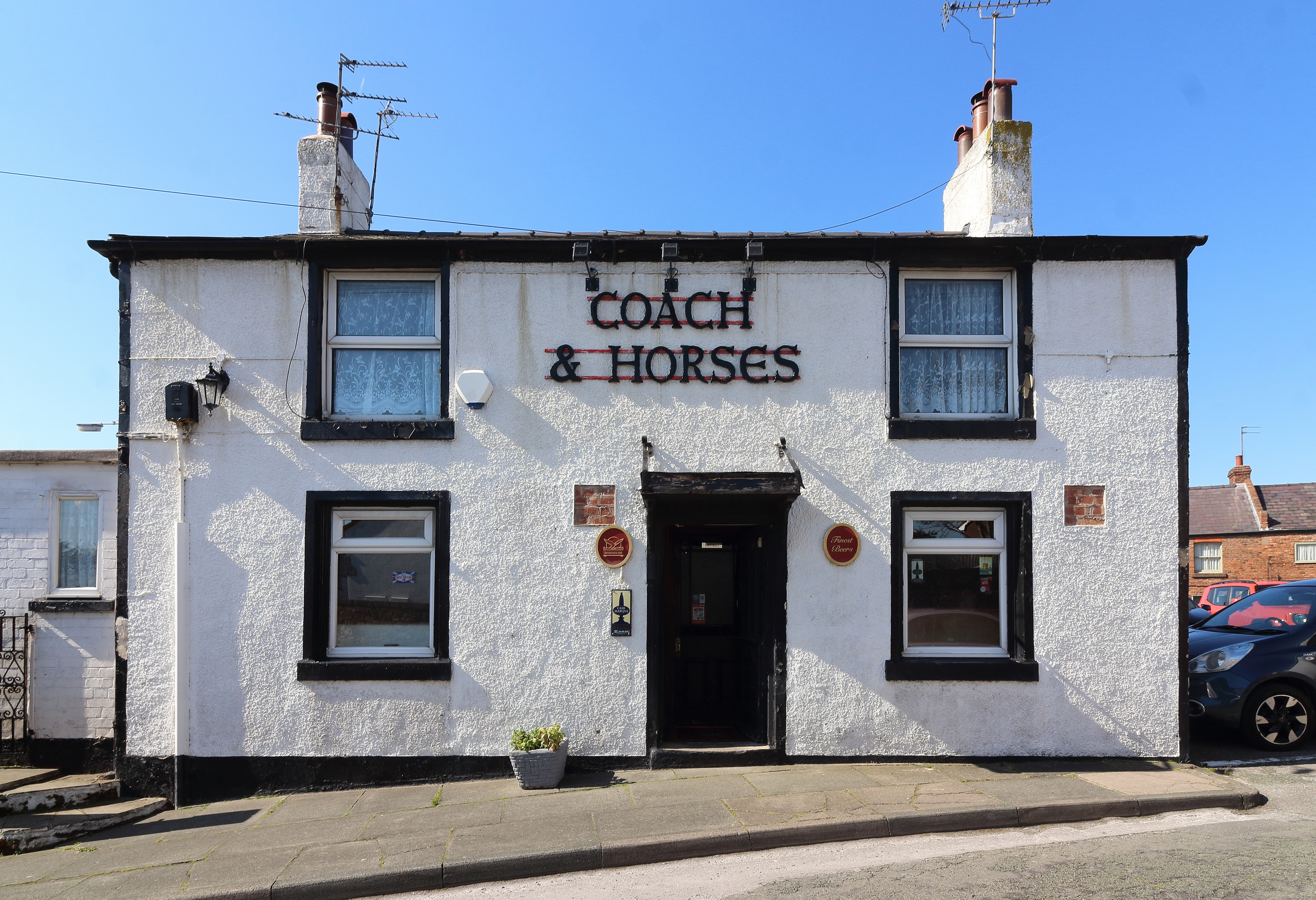
The Coach and Horses Inn, Greasby

There are five public houses in Greasby. The Coach and Horses is possibly the oldest pub, which was definitely in business by 1832, having been named on the Bryant map of that year, and possibly dating as far back as 1725. The Red Cat was built in 1964 to replace the New Inn which had stood a few metres from the site of the present building since at least 1849. The Twelfth Man opened around 1960 and was named as a result of its proximity to Upton Cricket Club. This pub has an adjoining budget hotel which is part of the Premier Inn chain. The pub was renamed The Gravesberie Inn in 2019. The Greave Dunning was an 18th-century farmhouse, and it was opened as a pub in 1981.

==== Parks and commons ====
Coronation Park is situated at the eastern end of the village. Upton Meadow borders Greasby to the east. Arrowe Park borders to the south-east.

=== Sport ===
JFC Greasby is a youth football club based in Greasby, which was founded in 2009. Greasby Livery caters for dressage and showjumping. The community centre also has a karate club. Greasby FC were a small football club, which played in the West Cheshire League between 1951 and 1958.

== Economy ==
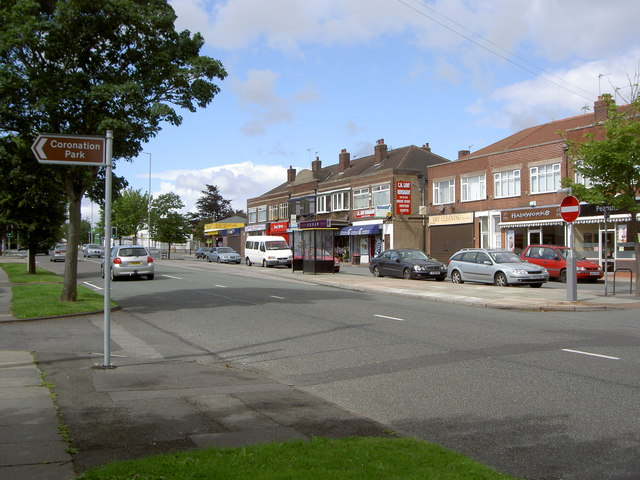
Shops on Greasby Road

The village contains a post office, a branch of Nisa, a branch of Age UK, a William Hill bookmaker and a BP petrol station. A Sainsbury's Local convenience store was opened on 8 October 2014, along with a veterinary surgery which opened on 6 October 2014. These were opened in new retail unit, after many parts of the local community opposed the construction of the new building. Greasby also has a number of other small shops including butchers, florist, greengrocer's, estate agents and a number of fast food takeaways.

== Transport ==
=== Road ===
Greasby is situated on the B5139, which runs between Upton and West Kirby. The A5027 Upton bypass is along the eastern side of Greasby, at the junction with the B5139. The A5027 connects directly to Junction 2A of the M53 motorway approximately 0.62 miles (1 km) from the junction with the B5139.

=== Rail ===
Upton railway station on the Borderlands line is the closest station to the village. Meols railway station on the Wirral line of the Merseyrail network is several miles to the north west.

== Notable people ==
- John Bowe, English actor, born in Greasby
- Mark Head, literary critic, born in Greasby
- Craig Lindfield, English footballer, born in Greasby
- Bill Rigby, English footballer, died in Greasby
- James Hype, English DJ, raised in Greasby

== Bibliography ==
- Mortimer, William Williams (1847). The History of the Hundred of Wirral. London: Whittaker & Co. p.273.
