= RAF West Kirby =

Former RAF base in Cheshire, England

RAF West Kirby
- Near West Kirby, Merseyside

Site information
- Type: RAF Training Camp
- Owner: Air Ministry
- Operator: Royal Air Force
- Open to the public: Yes

Location
- Shown within Merseyside RAF West Kirby (Cheshire) RAF West Kirby (the United Kingdom)
- Coordinates: 53.38°N 3.14°W

Site history
- Built by: 1940
- In use: 1940-1957

Royal Air Force West Kirby or more simply RAF West Kirby is a former Royal Air Force basic training camp near West Kirby, Cheshire, later Merseyside, England.

== History ==
RAF West Kirby was established at the beginning of the Second World War as a basic training camp for new recruits into the Royal Air Force. Although named West Kirby, it was located at Larton, then Cheshire, about 3 mi (4.8 km) from West Kirby. The camp entrance was on Saughall Massie Road, almost opposite Oldfield Lane. Despite being a military camp for the RAF, the base did not have an airfield or provide aviation training.

RAF West Kirby remained the first base (after kitting out at RAF Cardington) for many personnel serving during and after WWII between the 1940s and 1960 (although the final passing out parade took place on 20 December 1957). In the early Cold War era, most personnel were newly called up National Service personnel who were beginning their two-year service in the RAF as an Aircraftman (or AC2), the lowest enlisted rank in the RAF.

RAF West Kirby was responsible for giving new recruits an eight-week (later six weeks) training course which included learning parade ground drill, weapons training, intensive physical fitness regimes, and courses on ground and air defense. Training was overseen by non-commissioned officers from the RAF Regiment. Educational classes also covered RAF procedures, history, and operational duties. Recruits were accommodated in wooden barrack huts, each one housing about twenty men. Because West Kirby was a basic training camp, discipline was strict compared to regular RAF operational stations or trade training camp. After passing out of RAF West Kirby, successful recruits were posted to their chosen "trade training" camps elsewhere in the United Kingdom.

In three decades of operation, approximately 150,000 new recruits passed through RAF West Kirby until it was decommissioned in 1960. After closure, the entire camp was demolished and the land returned to agricultural use. In 2004, a dedication plaque was installed at the former entrance to RAF West Kirby. Later, a commemorative stone was installed.

== Gallery ==
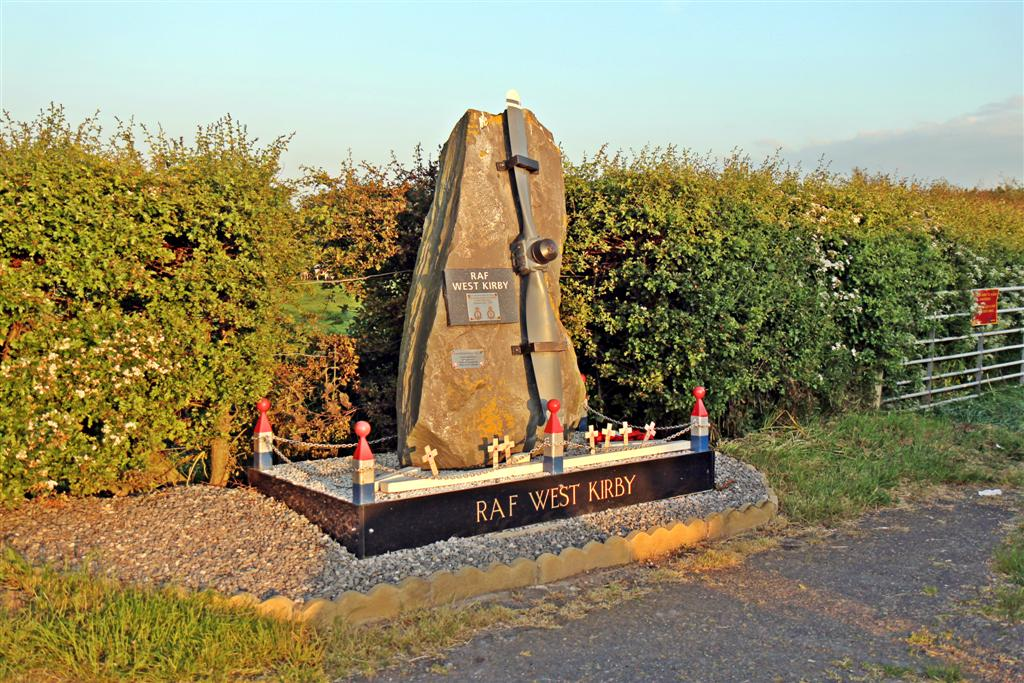
RAF West Kirby Monument.

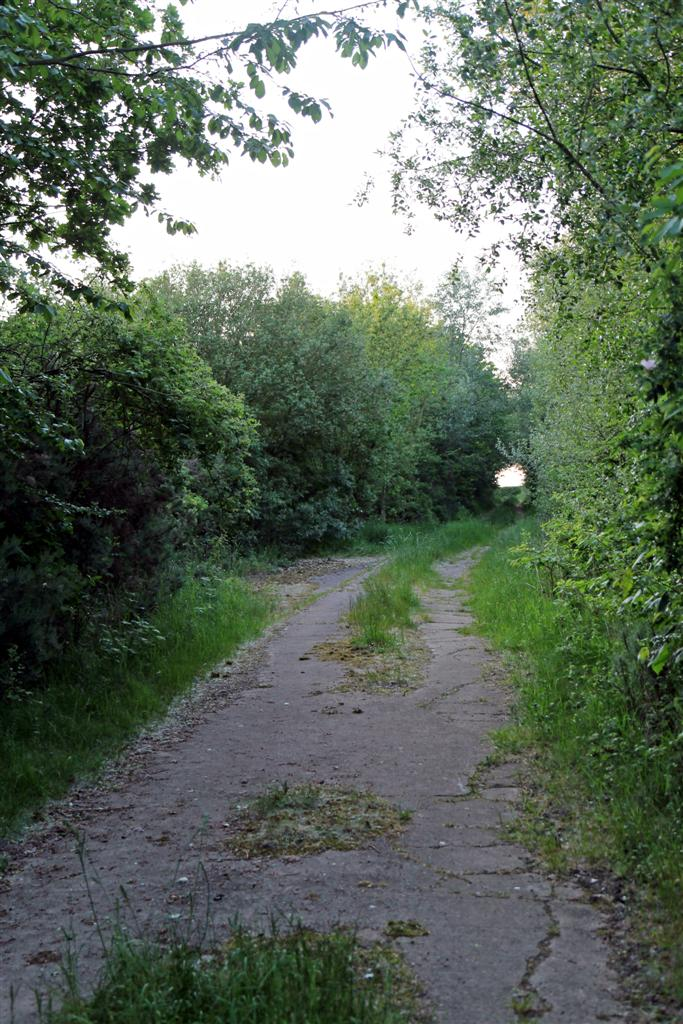
Woodland at the site of RAF West Kirby.

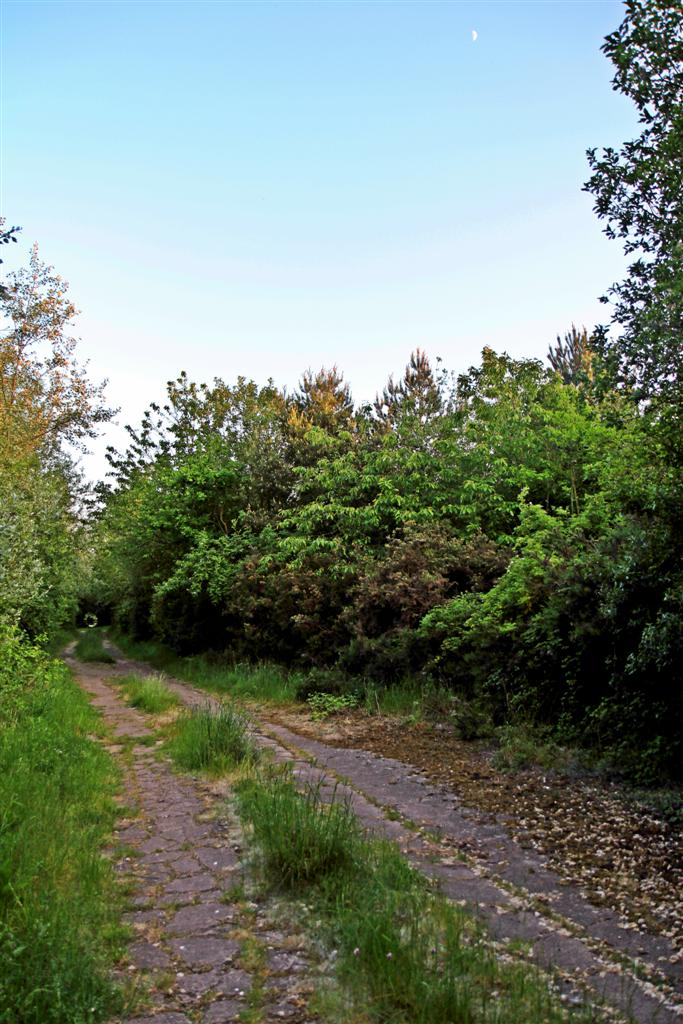
Pathway at the site of RAF West Kirby.
