= Leasowe =

Village on the Wirral Peninsula, Merseyside, England

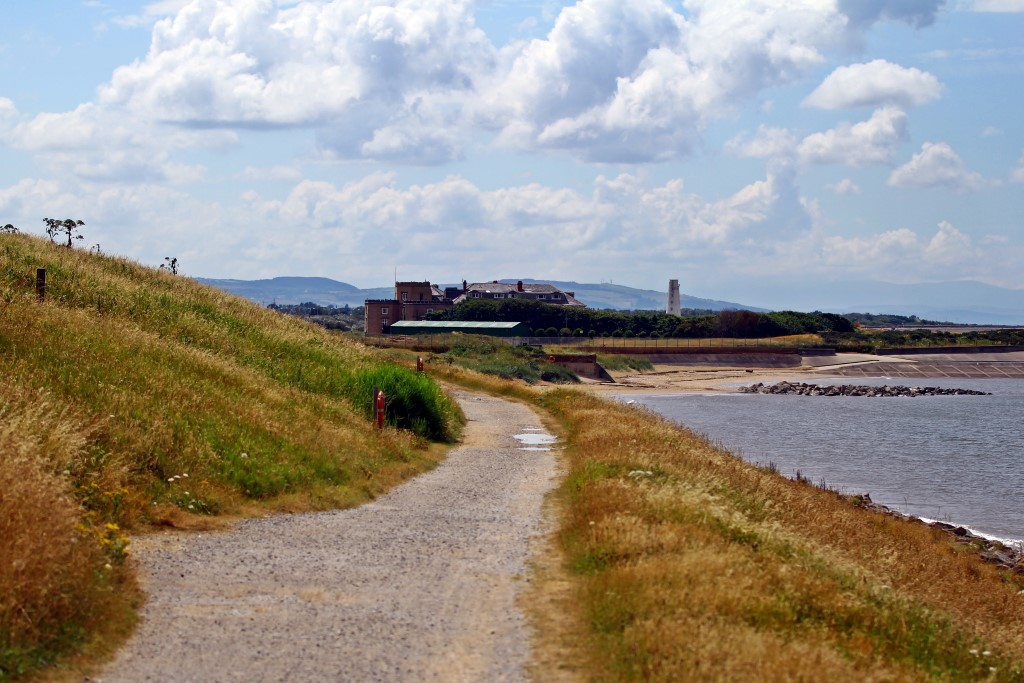
- The pathway along Mockbeggar Wharf, with Leasowe Castle and Leasowe Lighthouse in the distance

- Location within Merseyside
- Population: 6,180 (2001 census)
- OS grid reference: SJ270914
  - London: 182 mi (293 km) SE
- Metropolitan borough: Metropolitan Borough of Wirral
- Metropolitan county: Merseyside
- Region: North West
- Country: England
- Sovereign state: United Kingdom
- Post town: WIRRAL
- Postcode district: CH46
- Dialling code: 0151
- ISO 3166 code: GB-WRL
- Police: Merseyside
- Fire: Merseyside
- Ambulance: North West
- UK Parliament: Wallasey

Leasowe (/ˈliːsoʊ/) is a village in the Metropolitan Borough of Wirral, Merseyside, England. Located on the north coast of the Wirral Peninsula, it is approximately 2 mi (3.2 km) to the west of Wallasey.

Historically within Cheshire, Leasowe was part of the old County Borough of Wallasey. It is now within the Leasowe and Moreton East Ward of the Metropolitan Borough of Wirral. Leasowe is also part of the parliamentary constituency of Wallasey.

At the 2001 census, Leasowe had a population of 6,180. By the time of the 2011 census, specific figures for Leasowe were no longer maintained; the total population of the Leasowe and Moreton East ward was 14,640.

== History ==
The name Leasowex comes from the Anglo-Saxon Leasowes or Meadow Pastures; its sand dunes are the largest such system on the Wirral. Much of the area is at or below sea level and is protected by the coastal embankment. Houses built in the early 20th century were often flooded and unsanitary but, after about 1926, new roads and drainage were put in by the Borough Council and much new housing was developed. Along the embankment between Leasowe and Moreton are the remains of fortifications built during the Second World War.

The world's first passenger hovercraft service operated in 1961–62; the service travelled from Moreton Common and was advertised as between Wallasey and Rhyl in North Wales. However, the service was not profitable and soon ceased.

== Geography ==
The River Fender merges with the Birket at Leasowe; the Birket then continues towards West Float at the site of the former Wallasey Pool.

== Landmarks ==
=== Solar School ===
Leasowe
- Location in Merseyside
- 53°25′11″N 03°04′45″W
- OS grid reference: SJ 2837491974

History
- Built: 1961

Site notes
- Area: Wirral, Merseyside
- Architect: Emslie A Morgan
- Architectural style: Passive solar building design

Listed Building – Grade II
- Designated: January 1996
- Reference no.: 1246185

The Solar Campus, on Leasowe Road, is the former St Georges Secondary School, and is the site of the Solar Building, the first building in the world to be heated entirely by solar energy. At 53.4°N, it is also the most northerly. The school was built in 1955, in the contemporary style as the St Georges Secondary School for Girls; in 1958, it was decided to admit boys, requiring a doubling in capacity.

This was met by building a new block, now known as the Solar Building, to a design by Emslie Morgan, the Assistant Borough Architect, who spent a lifetime looking into ways of harnessing the sun's rays. His design featured a high south-facing solar wall, largely of glass, to absorb the sun's warmth, a sloping well-insulated roof, and a low blind north-facing wall backing the buildings corridor. The solar wall is built of glass leaves two feet apart; these draw the ultra violet rays from sunshine and reflect them around the walls of the classrooms. The walls become warm and heat the air. Hardly any warmth escapes through the school's massively thick roof and walls covered with slabs of plastic foam. On the coldest days it is always 60 °F (16 °C) inside and, in summer, the school is cooler than its more conventional neighbours; panels inside the glass wall can be turned to deflect heat or absorb it.

A small secondary single-pipe heating system was installed to give additional heating on cold winter days with very few hours of sunlight but, by 1966, it had never been used and was dismantled. In 1963, the Liverpool Echo reported that during the previous winter temperatures never dropped below 60 °F (16 °C), while in the summer it was cooler than the older part of the school.

The property is Grade II listed and is maintained by the Children & Young People's Department of the Metropolitan Borough of Wirral.

=== Leasowe Castle ===
Leasowe Castle
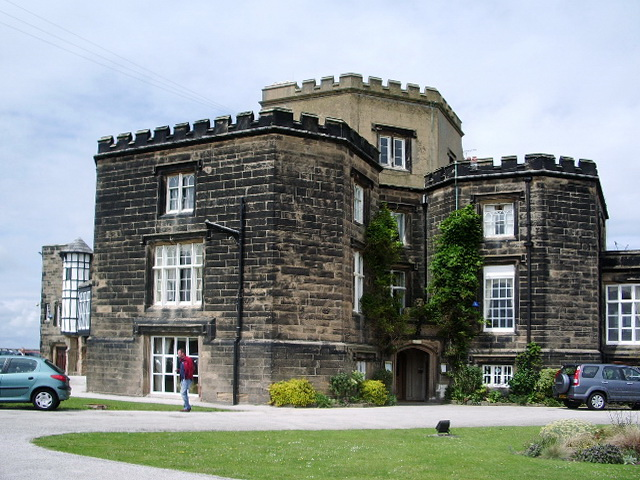
- Leasowe Castle

- Location in Merseyside
- 53°25′06.32″N 03°06′28.16″W
- OS grid reference: SJ 26471 91863

History
- Built: 1593

Site notes
- Area: Wirral, Merseyside
- Architectural style: Private house

Listed Building – Grade II*
- Designated: May 1952
- Reference no.: 1273527

Leasowe Castle may have been built for Ferdinando Stanley, 5th Earl of Derby – a patron of Shakespeare – in 1593, possibly (though this is disputed) as an observation platform for the Wallasey races which took place on the sands in the 16th and 17th centuries, and which are regarded as a forerunner of the Derby races. Ferdinando's brother William, the 6th Earl, was described as a noted sportsman and is remembered as a keen supporter of the Wallasey races.

At first the castle consisted only of an octagonal tower. This had become disused by 1700, and it became known as "Mockbeggar Hall", a term often used for an ornate but derelict building. The term Mockbeggar Wharf is still used for the adjoining foreshore. The Mockbeggar Hall is also the name of a Wetherspoons pub in neighbouring Moreton.

In 1821, ownership passed to the Cust family. After 1826, the building was used as a hotel for some years. The ceiling of the Star Chamber at the Palace of Westminster was brought to the castle in 1836 along with panelling and other furnishings; they had been salvaged from the old Palace of Westminster before the Star Chamber was demolished in an 1806 building project. The Star Chamber was so called because the ceiling was decorated with bright stars. The ceiling and four tapestries depicting the four seasons still remain. Oak panelling from the Star Chamber and some made from the submerged forest along the coast were also installed; however, these were removed in 1893.

Between 1911 and 1970, it became a railway convalescent home; between 1974 and 1980, it was owned by Wirral Borough Council. It reopened as a hotel in December 1982 and was acquired by Lawton Hotels Ltd in 2000. The building became a popular venue for weddings and other family functions, with around 50 bedrooms. The hotel closed "until further notice" in February 2025.

Leasowe Castle is recorded in the National Heritage List for England as a designated Grade II* listed building.

=== Leasowe Lighthouse ===
Leasowe lighthouse
- Location in Merseyside
- 53°24′47″N 03°07′33″W
- OS grid reference: SJ 2526891296

History
- Built: 1761

Site notes
- Area: Wirral, Merseyside
- Architectural style: Lighthouse

Listed Building – Grade II
- Designated: May 1952
- Reference no.: 1259738

Leasowe Lighthouse was built in 1763 by Liverpool Corporation's Docks Committee (the forerunner of the Mersey Docks and Harbour Board) and is the oldest brick-built lighthouse in Britain. According to local tradition its foundations were built on bales of cotton from a nearby shipwreck. Around 1763, William Hutchinson installed what may have been the first parabolic reflector in a lighthouse. The lighthouse was one of four lights on the North Wirral foreshore, the others being two at Hoylake and another – a lower light – at Leasowe. The latter was soon destroyed by the sea and was replaced by a lighthouse on Bidston Hill in 1771.

The lighthouse was operational until 14 July 1908, with the only known female lighthouse keeper in those days, a Mrs. Williams. It then became a tearoom for a period, but was unused before 1989, since when it has been the base for the ranger service of the North Wirral Coastal Park. The lighthouse is a Grade II listed building and houses a visitor centre which is occasionally open to the public.

=== Leasowe Hospital ===
Leasowe Hospital or The Leasowe Sanatorium For Crippled Children and Hospital for Tuberculosis, to give its full and original name, later became known as the Liverpool Open-Air Hospital, Leasowe, and finally Leasowe Hospital. Margaret Beavan (1877–1931) was the driving force of the hospital, admired by all, she was known affectionately as the "Little Mother of Liverpool", also not quite as complimentary, the "Mighty Atom" and "Clever Beggar".

The first mention of a sanatorium for children with tuberculosis occurred on 16 December 1911. Slowly, Leasowe Hospital changed from being principally a children's T.B. hospital to one for dealing with burns and skin grafts, and then arthritis until its closure in 1979. Another name closely associated with Leasowe, amongst others, is that of (the late) Dr T.R. Littler, Consultant Rheumatologist, who was devoted to Leasowe. Leasowe Hospital was eventually bought by the Wirral Christian Centre in 1981; it was used later as a retirement home and handicap centre. After failing to make that facility work, the buildings were eventually repossessed then later demolished around 2002–03. Luxury flats and houses have since been built on the site.

=== Notable staff at Leasowe Hospital ===
- Edith Marie Tucker (1876-unknown), Matron of the new hospital building from 1915 to 1919. Tucker trained at The London Hospital under Matron Eva Luckes between 1904 and 1906. After her training Tucker remained at the London as a staff nurse, then gained promotion to sister working as holiday sister, night sister, in Outpatients department and in Matron's Office until she was seconded to head a party of London Hospital nurses to the Balkan Wars between 1912 and 1913.
- Charlotte Hughes (1883–1961), Matron 1919- 1943. Hughes also trained at The London Hospital between 1906 and 1908. After her training Hughes remained at The London working in various departments including the Private Nursing Institute, as a ward staff nurse, and pupil (student) Midwife, before being promoted to holiday sister, then ward sister. Hughes was in charge of both the TB hospital and adjacent Liverpool Babies Hospital, comprising over 300 beds. In 1927, Hughes wrote an article about Orthopaedic Nursing. Whilst she was Matron at Leasowe, one of Hughes's ward sister's married, and Hughes 'gave the bride away.' Probationer nurses trained for two years at Leasowe in the nursing care of children with Surgical Tuberculosis.

== Transport ==
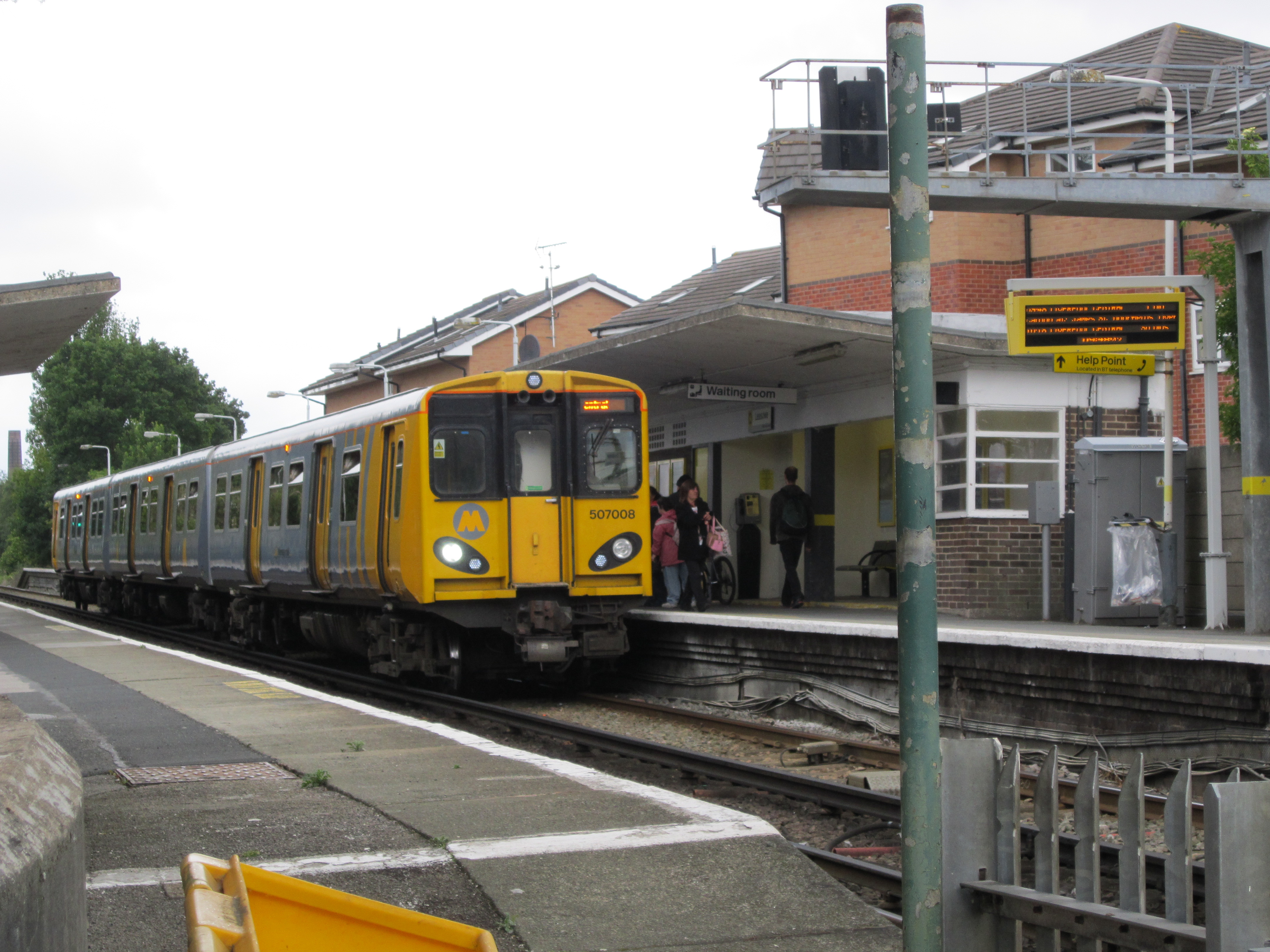
A Merseyrail train waits at the station with a service to Liverpool

Leasowe railway station is a stop on the Wirral Line of the Merseyrail network. Electric trains run every 15 minutes during the day eastbound to Liverpool Central and westbound to West Kirby; this reduces to 30 minutes in late evenings and on Sundays.

Bus services in the area are operated primarily by Arriva North West, A2B Travel and Al's Coaches. Routes connect Leasowe with nearby towns including Birkenhead, Hoylake and Wallasey; the 423 provides a regular service to Whitechapel, Liverpool.

== Governance ==
Leasowe is part of the Wallasey parliamentary constituency and represented by Angela Eagle MP.

The majority of the Leasowe area is governed locally as part of the Leasowe & Moreton East ward, which takes in the Leasowe housing estate, developments along Leasowe Road and East Moreton. Between 2008 and 2014, one of the councillors was Ian Lewis - the first-ever Conservative councillor to represent the area on Wirral Council. The most recent local elections took place on 6 May 2021, with the ward being represented by three Labour Party councillors.

== Notable people ==
- Malcolm Lowry, English writer, born in Leasowe.
- Shirley Ballas (head judge on Strictly Come Dancing 2017–present)

== See also ==
- North Wirral Coastal Park

== Bibliography ==
- Wallasey Historical Society (2003). Wallasey at War 1939–45 including Moreton & Leasowe. Prenton: Ian & Marilyn Boumphrey. ISBN 9781899241149. OCLC 751486916.
- Speakman, Jeff (2011). A beacon on the past : a community archaeological excavation at Leasowe lighthouse, Great Meols, Wirral, 2007. National Museums Liverpool. ISBN 9781902700458. OCLC 781407030.
- Boumphrey, Ian (2008). Yesterday's Wallasey & New Brighton : including : Moreton, Leasowe & Saughall Massie : A Pictorial History 1860 to 1960. Prenton: Ian & Marilyn Boumphrey. ISBN 9781899241286. OCLC 652015249.
- Leasowe Golf Club. Leasowe Golf Club, 1891–1991. Merseyside: Leasowe Golf Club. OCLC 855394143.
- Martin, T. Hartley (1920). Liverpool Hospital for Children, Leasowe, Cheshire : a hospital-school for the treatment of surgical tuberculosis : a description of the hospital, its work and progress. Leasowe: Liverpool Hospital for Children. OCLC 904283843.
