= Greasby Brook =

Brook in Wirral, England

Coordinates: 53.3748°N 3.1315°W

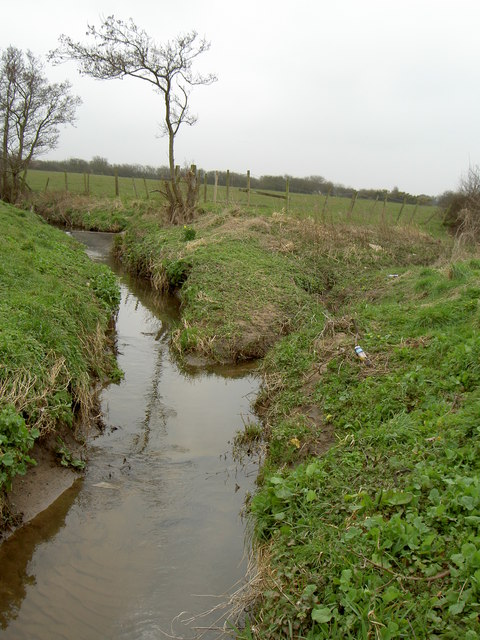
The confluence of Arrowe Brook and Greasby Brook, near to Saughall Massie.

Greasby Brook is a tributary of Arrowe Brook, in Wirral, Merseyside. The brook starts near to Dawlish Road in Thurstaston. The brook flows through Thurstaston Common and around the western side of Greasby, before converging, firstly, with Newton Brook, and then with Arrowe Brook between Greasby and Saughall Massie. Arrowe Brook then joins the Birket at Moreton. The Birket, in turn, discharges into the West Float at the site of the former Wallasey Pool.
