= Wirral Hundred =

Ancient administrative area in England

Coordinates: 53.364°N 3.036°W

The Hundred of Wirral is the ancient administrative area for the Wirral Peninsula. Its name is believed to have originated from the Hundred of Wilaveston, the historic name for Willaston, which was an important assembly point in the Wirral Hundred during the Middle Ages. The ton suffix in a place name normally indicates a previous use as a meeting location for officials. During its existence, the hundred was one of the Hundreds of Cheshire.

Since local government reorganisation, implemented on 1 April 1974, the area is split between Merseyside (Metropolitan Borough of Wirral) and Cheshire.

== Villages ==
The Hundred contained the following villages:

- Backford
- Barnston
- Bromborough
- Capenhurst
- Eastham
- Gayton
- Greasby
- Great Caldy
- Great Sutton
- Heswall
- Hoose (present day Hoylake)
- Hooton
- Landican
- Ledsham
- Leighton
- Little Caldy
- Little Neston
- Little Sutton
- Meols
- Moreton
- Ness
- Neston
- Noctorum
- Pensby
- Poulton
- Prenton
- Puddington
- Raby
- Saughall
- Storeton
- Sutton
- Thingwall
- Thornton Hough
- Thurstaston
- Upton
- Wallasey
- Willaston
- Woodchurch
