= List of schools in Wirral =

This is a list of schools in the Metropolitan Borough of Wirral in the English county of Merseyside.

== State-funded schools ==
=== Primary schools ===
- Barnston Primary School, Heswall
- Bedford Drive Primary School, Rock Ferry
- Bidston Avenue Primary School, Claughton
- Bidston Village CE Primary School, Bidston
- Birkenhead Christ Church CE Primary School, Birkenhead
- Birkenhead High School Academy, Oxton
- Black Horse Hill school, West Kirby
- Brackenwood Infant School, Bebington
- Brackenwood Junior School, Bebington
- Brookdale Primary School, Greasby
- Brookhurst Primary School, Bromborough
- Castleway Primary School, Moreton
- Cathcart Street Primary School, Birkenhead
- Christ The King RC Primary School, Bromborough
- Church Drive Primary School, Port Sunlight
- Co-op Academy Hillside, Prenton
- Co-op Academy Portland, Claughton
- Co-op Academy Woodslee, Bromborough
- Devonshire Park Primary School, Tranmere
- Eastway Primary School, Moreton
- Egremont Primary School, Wallasey
- Fender Primary School, Woodchurch
- Gayton Primary School, Gayton
- Greasby Infant School, Greasby
- Greasby Junior School, Greasby
- Great Meols Primary School, Meols
- Greenleas Primary School, Wallasey
- Grove Street Primary School, New Ferry
- Heswall Primary School, Heswall
- Heswall St Peter's CE Primary School, Heswall
- Heygarth Primary School, Eastham
- Higher Bebington Junior School, Bebington
- Holy Cross RC Primary School, Bidston
- Holy Spirit RC/CE Primary School, Leasowe
- Hoylake Holy Trinity CE Primary school, Hoylake
- Irby Primary School, Irby
- Kingsway Primary School, Wallasey
- Ladymount RC Primary School, Pensby
- Leasowe Primary School, Leasowe
- Lingham Primary School, Moreton
- Liscard Primary School, Wallasey
- Manor Primary School, Birkenhead
- Mendell Primary School, Bromborough
- Mersey Park Primary School, Tranmere
- Millfields CE Primary School, Eastham
- Moreton Christ Church CE Primary School, Moreton
- Mount Primary School, Wallasey
- New Brighton Primary School, New Brighton
- Our Lady and St Edward's RC Primary School, Birkenhead
- Our Lady of Pity RC Primary School, Greasby
- Overchurch Infant School, Upton
- Overchurch Junior School, Upton
- Oxton St Saviour's CE Primary School, Prenton
- Park Primary School, Wallasey
- Pensby Primary School, Pensby
- Poulton Lancelyn Primary School, Bebington
- Prenton Primary School, Prenton
- The Priory Parish CE Primary School, Birkenhead
- Raeburn Primary School, Bromborough
- Riverside Primary School, Wallasey
- Rock Ferry Primary School, Rock Ferry
- Sacred Heart RC Primary School, Moreton
- St Alban's RC Primary School, Liscard
- St Andrew's CE Primary School, Bebington
- St Anne's RC Primary School, Rock Ferry
- St George's Primary School, Wallasey
- St John's RC Infant School, Bebington
- St John's RC Junior School, Bebington
- St Joseph's RC Primary School, Oxton
- St Joseph's RC Primary School, Upton
- St Joseph's RC Primary School, Wallasey
- St Michaels and All Angels RC Primary School, Woodchurch
- St Paul's RC Primary School, Beechwood
- St Peter's RC Primary School, Noctorum
- St Werburgh's RC Primary School, Birkenhead
- SS Peter and Paul RC Primary School, Wallasey
- Sandbrook Primary School, Moreton
- Somerville Primary school, Wallasey
- Stanton Road Primary School, Bebington
- Thingwall Primary School, Thingwall
- Thornton Hough Primary School, Thornton Hough
- Thurstaston Dawpool CE Primary School, Thurstaston
- Town Lane Infant School, Bebington
- Townfield Primary School, Prenton
- Well Lane Primary School, Rock Ferry
- West Kirby Primary School, West Kirby
- West Kirby St Bridget's CE Primary School, West Kirby
- Woodchurch CE Primary School, Woodchurch
- Woodchurch Road Academy, Oxted
- Woodlands Primary School, Birkenhead

=== Non-selective secondary schools ===
- Birkenhead High School Academy, Oxton
- Birkenhead Park School, Birkenhead
- Co-op Academy Bebington, Bebington
- Hilbre High School, West Kirby
- The Mosslands School, Wallasey
- The Oldershaw Academy, Wallasey
- Pensby High School, Pensby
- Prenton High School for Girls, Birkenhead
- Ridgeway High School, Noctorum
- St John Plessington Catholic College, Bebington
- St Mary's College, Wallasey
- South Wirral High School, Eastham
- Weatherhead High School, Wallasey
- Woodchurch High School, Woodchurch

=== Grammar schools ===
- Calday Grange Grammar School, West Kirby
- St Anselm's College, Birkenhead
- Upton Hall School FCJ, Upton
- West Kirby Grammar School, West Kirby
- Wirral Grammar School for Boys, Bebington
- Wirral Grammar School for Girls, Bebington

=== Special and alternative schools ===
- Clare Mount Specialist Sports College, Moreton
- Elleray Park School, Wallasey
- Foxfield School, Woodchurch
- Gilbrook School, Woodchurch
- Hayfield School, Upton
- Kilgarth School, Birkenhead
- Life Wirral, Wallasey [closed]
- Meadowside School, Woodchurch
- The Observatory School, Bidston
- Orrets Meadow School, Moreton
- Stanley School, Pensby
- Wirral Hospitals School, Claughton

=== Further education ===
- Birkenhead Sixth Form College
- Wirral Metropolitan College

== Independent schools ==
=== Primary and preparatory schools ===
- Avalon School, West Kirby
- Prenton Preparatory School, Prenton

=== Senior and all-through schools ===
- Birkenhead School, Oxton

=== Special and alternative schools ===
- IMPACT Northwest Schools, Birkenhead
- Life Wirral (Independent) Sport School, Wallasey
- Progress Schools - Hamilton Square, Birkenhead
- Progress Schools - Wirral, Birkenhead
- Utopia, Birkenhead
- West Kirby Residential School, West Kirby
- Wirral Wrap, Birkenhead
