= Irby, Merseyside =

Village in Wirral, England

Coordinates: 53.352°N 3.117°W

Irby
- Village
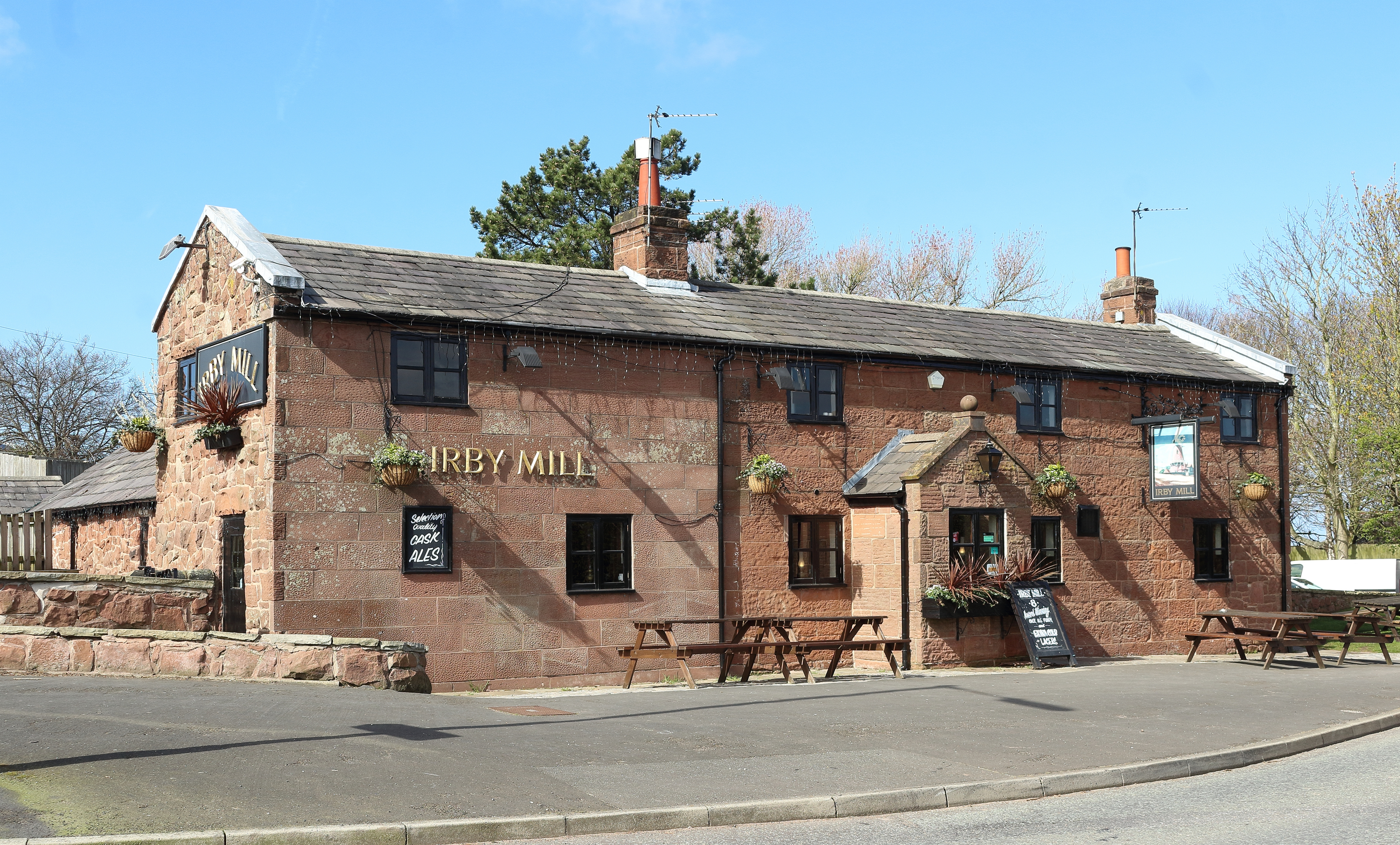
- The Irby Mill pub, Mill Lane

- Location within Merseyside
- Population: 6,110 (2001 census)
- OS grid reference: SJ256845
  - London: 179 mi (288 km) SE
- Metropolitan borough: Wirral
- Metropolitan county: Merseyside
- Region: North West
- Country: England
- Sovereign state: United Kingdom
- Post town: WIRRAL
- Postcode district: CH61
- Dialling code: 0151
- ISO 3166 code: GB-WRL
- Police: Merseyside
- Fire: Merseyside
- Ambulance: North West
- UK Parliament: Wirral West

Irby (locally /ˈɜːrbi/) is a village on the Wirral Peninsula, in Merseyside, England. The village covers an area of 20 square kilometres. To the north of Irby lies the associated hamlet of Irby Hill. It is part of the Greasby, Frankby and Irby Ward of the Metropolitan Borough of Wirral and is within the parliamentary constituency of Wirral West.

According to the 2001 census, Irby had a population of 6,110, By the time of the 2011 census a separate statistic for Irby was no longer maintained. However, the total population of Greasby, Frankby and Irby Ward was 13,991.

== History ==
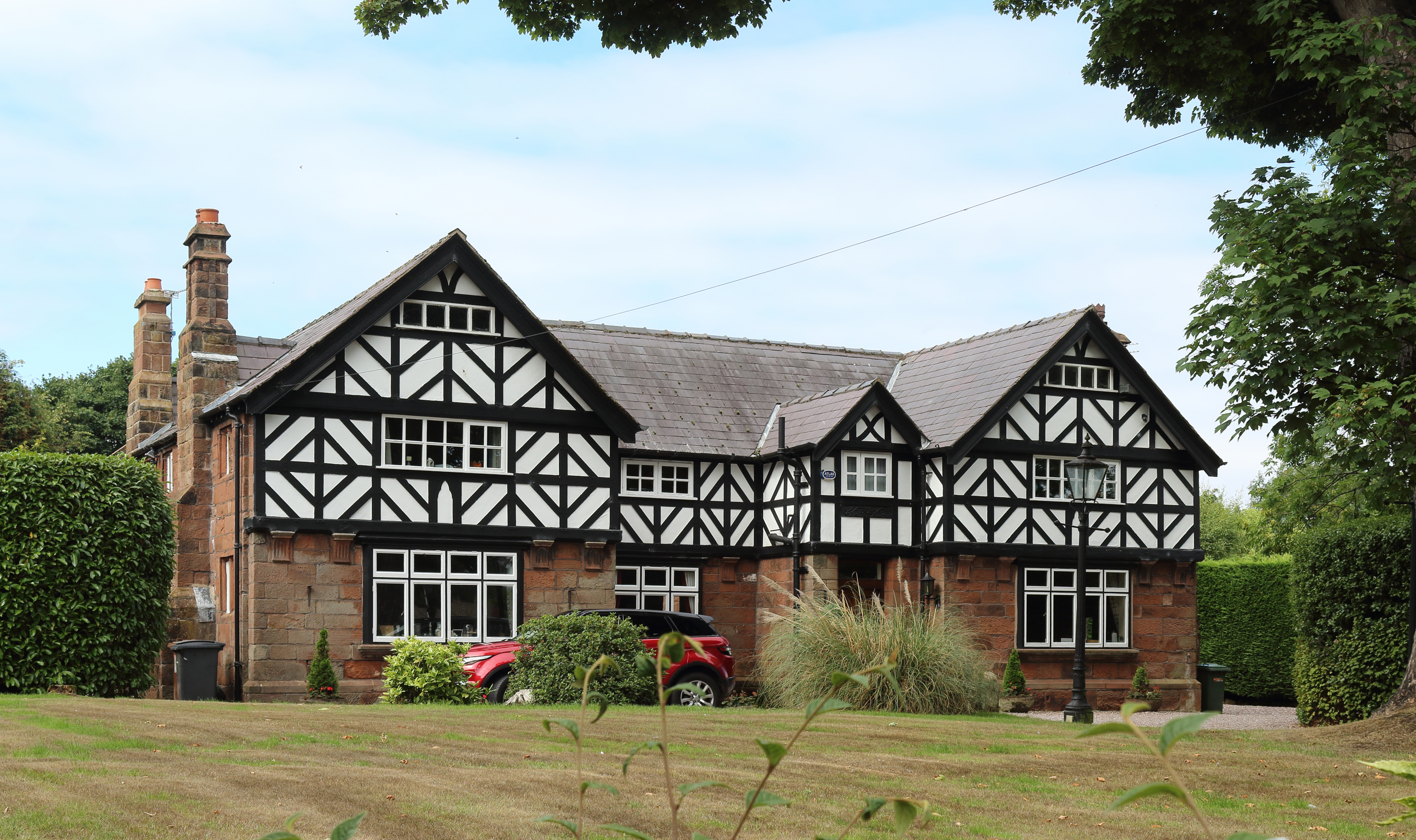
Irby Hall

The name Irby (Iri býr) is of Viking origin, meaning "farmstead or settlement of the Irish". It is derived from the Old Norse words Íri (Irishman) and bȳ (a farmstead or settlement). Historically, the name has been spelt as Irreby (1096) and Ireby (1232). Other nearby towns and villages with the Viking "by" suffix in their name include Frankby, Greasby and Pensby.

Although not mentioned in the Domesday Book, the land of the present day village was recorded as being granted to the Abbey of St Werburgh by Hugh Lupus in 1093.

=== Irby Mill ===
A reference to the existence of a mill at Irby was made in a rental agreement of 1431, whereby tenants were expected to "...grind at Irby Mill to the 16th measure." This referred to the miller receiving this amount in flour as a toll. This original wooden structure was replaced by a post mill in the early 18th century. After being disused since about 1878 and in a very dilapidated condition, the mill was demolished in 1898. Along with a similar structure in Burton, it was one of the last post mills of its kind on the Wirral. The demolition work was carried out by unskilled labour hired by the miller. They removed the brick base first, resulting in the whole structure becoming dangerously unsafe and crashing to the ground, narrowly avoiding injury or loss of life. The Irby Mill public house, which opened for business in 1980, stands adjacent to the site in a building formerly known as Irby Mill Cottage.

=== Irby Hall ===
Irby Hall was constructed in the early 17th century, with an entrance facade added in 1888. The hall was built on the site of an 11th-century moated manor and courthouse of St Werburgh's Abbey. The moat is now dry, but has a prominent outer bank. Irby Hall was made a Grade II listed building in 1962.

== Geography, geology and environment ==
Irby lies on the western side of the northern part of the Wirral Peninsula, 4.0 miles (6.5 km) from the Irish Sea at Hoylake, 1.2 miles (2 km) from the Dee Estuary and about 4.7 miles (7.5 km) from the River Mersey at Tranmere. Irby sits on the eastern side of Thurstaston Hill, at the western side of a wide and shallow glacial U-shaped valley, formed during the Quaternary Ice Age. The underlying bedrock is Triassic bunter sandstone of the Helsby Sandstone Formation, and Triassic siltstone of the Tarporley Siltstone Formation. This is overlain with boulder clay from the Quaternary Ice Age, similar to the nearby Dee Cliffs, and clay soil. The bedrock is not usually visible, as it is at the summit of Thurstaston Hill.

The highest point in Irby is 83 metres (272 ft) above sea level, on Irby Road, near to Irby Hall, in the centre of the village. The higher prominence of Thurstaston Hill is at 90 metres (300 ft) above sea level, 1 kilometre (1,100 yd) to the west. All of the populated area is more than 55 metres (180 ft) above sea level, and the ground is on a gentle hillside.

Irby is bounded by Greasby Brook, to the west, which also travels through and alongside Thurstaston Common. The brook has its source in the fields to the south-west of Irby. Meanwhile, Irby is bounded to the north, east and south by part of the field drainage which forms Arrowe Brook.

=== Climate ===
Irby has a temperate maritime climate (Köppen: Cfb), similar to much of the rest of the United Kingdom. Being close to the sea and sheltered from the prevailing south-westerly wind by Snowdonia, the area has relatively warm summers. The winters are generally mild and wet, mornings with light frost are common, and there are few days of snow. The nearest official weather station, as the crow flies, is at Hall Road in Crosby, which is about 10.4 miles (16.7 km) to the north.

Climate data for Irby/(Crosby), elevation 9m, 1981–2010
Month	Jan	Feb	Mar	Apr	May	Jun	Jul	Aug	Sep	Oct	Nov	Dec	Year
Mean daily maximum °C (°F)	7.2 (45.0)	7.3 (45.1)	9.4 (48.9)	12.2 (54.0)	15.6 (60.1)	17.9 (64.2)	19.7 (67.5)	19.4 (66.9)	17.3 (63.1)	13.9 (57.0)	10.2 (50.4)	7.5 (45.5)	13.2 (55.8)
Mean daily minimum °C (°F)	2.4 (36.3)	2.1 (35.8)	3.8 (38.8)	5.1 (41.2)	7.9 (46.2)	11.1 (52.0)	13.3 (55.9)	13.2 (55.8)	11.0 (51.8)	8.2 (46.8)	5.2 (41.4)	2.5 (36.5)	7.2 (45.0)
Average precipitation mm (inches)	74.9 (2.95)	54.4 (2.14)	63.6 (2.50)	54.3 (2.14)	54.9 (2.16)	66.2 (2.61)	59.0 (2.32)	68.9 (2.71)	71.7 (2.82)	97.3 (3.83)	82.6 (3.25)	88.8 (3.50)	836.6 (32.94)
Average rainy days (≥ 1.0 mm)	13.8	10.7	12.5	10.4	10.6	10.5	10.1	11.2	11.5	14.8	14.6	13.9	144.3
Source: Met Office

== Demographics ==
The population was 96 in 1801, 180 in 1851 and 146 in 1901. Whilst not being diverse in terms of ethnicity, Irby is an economically diverse neighbourhood, possessing a mixture of large 1930s built private houses together with an estate of 1970s built homes in a range of sizes and an element of 1950s built council housing all in close proximity. In this respect it is regarded locally as a very desirable place to live. Irby is within the catchment area for two local grammar schools: Calday Grange Grammar School for Boys and West Kirby Grammar School for Girls. Despite the typically suburban character of most of its neighbourhoods, Irby is surrounded on all sides by a large amount of green belt and woodland.

== Governance ==
Historically within the county of Cheshire, Irby was formerly a township in the Thurstaston and Woodchurch parishes of the Wirral Hundred. In 1866 Irby became a separate civil parish. Irby was part of Wirral Rural Sanitary District from 1866, then Wirral Rural District from 1894 and Wirral Urban District from 1933. In 1951 the parish had a population of 4032. On 1 April 1974 the parish was abolished. Further changes occurred on 1 April 1974, when local government reorganisation resulted in most of Wirral, including Irby, transfer from Cheshire to the newly formed metropolitan county of Merseyside.

As of 2026, Irby is incorporated into the Greasby, Frankby and Irby Ward of the Metropolitan Borough of Wirral. It is represented on Wirral Borough Council by three Labour councillors. The most recent local elections took place on 4 May 2023.

The village is part of the parliamentary constituency of Wirral West. It is currently represented by Labour MP Matthew Patrick.

Earlier MPs have included Selwyn Lloyd, a former Foreign Secretary, Chancellor of the Exchequer and Speaker of the House of Commons, as well as William Lever, the founder of Lever Brothers.

== Economy ==
=== Shops ===
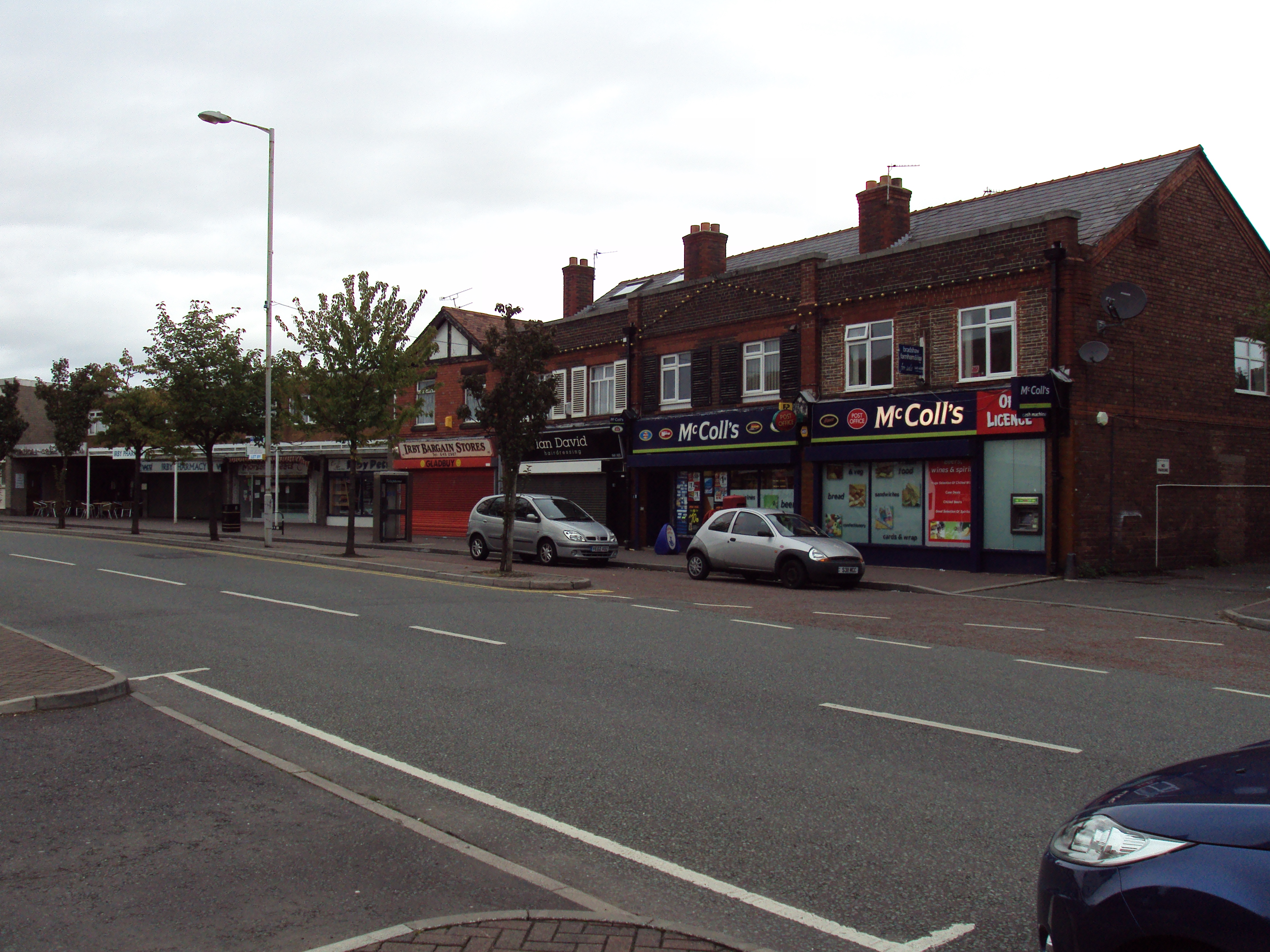
Shops, Thingwall Road

Irby's small shopping area has a Morrisons local convenience store, which includes a branch of the Post Office. The shopping area also includes hairdressers, a florist, fast food outlets, restaurants and an off licence.

=== Services ===
Arrowe Park Hospital is about a mile from the centre of the village, and includes an Accident and Emergency department. Irby is served by a pharmacy and a dentist.

Irby has an MOT test centre on Mill Hill Road. The Irby telephone exchange serves 6,653 residential premises and 155 non-residential premises. The exchange is operated by BT and provides ADSL services, among others.

== Community ==
=== Schools ===
Pensby High School is the nearest state secondary school. Irby Primary School is the local state primary school, with Dawpool CofE primary school also being nearby, towards Thurstaston. However children from the area attend many other schools on Wirral; Calday Grange Grammar School, West Kirby Grammar School, Birkenhead School, Birkenhead Preparatory School, Birkenhead High School to name five.

=== Churches ===
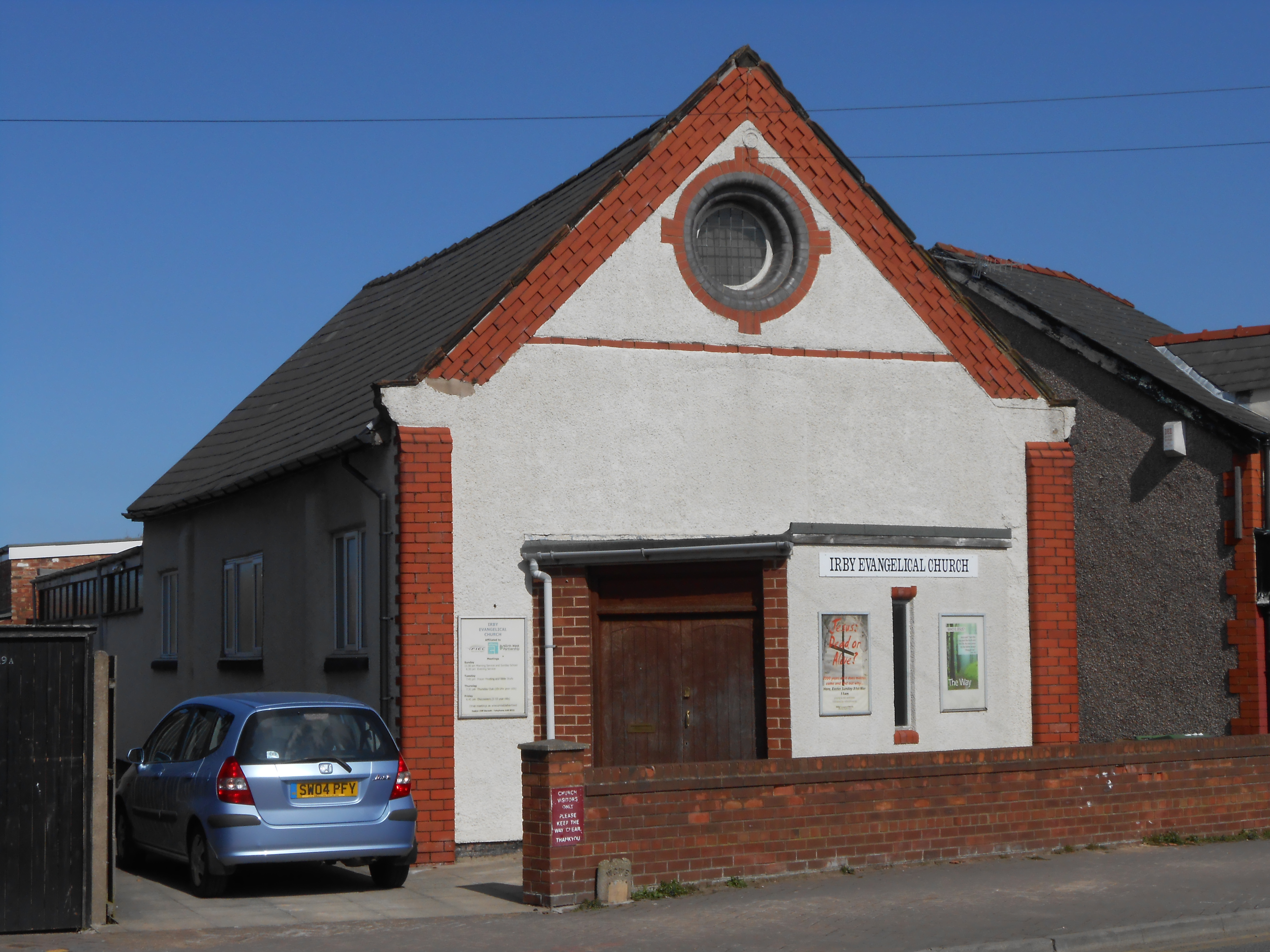
Irby Evangelical Church

Irby has three churches. Two of these are the Irby Methodist Church and the Irby Evangelical Church. Meanwhile, St. Chad's Church is a branch of St Bartholomew's Church in Thurstaston. Frank Lester was a previous organist of the Methodist chapel.

=== Leisure ===
Irby has a village hall, situated on Thingwall Road, which hosted a performance by The Beatles on 7 September 1962. The village is home to the 1st Thurstaston scout group, which was started in 1933, shortly after the 3rd World Scout Jamboree, held about a mile away, in Arrowe Park, in 1929. The Irby Club was formed in the early 1930s, and is in the centre of the village, in a building which was once the farm house for the former Rookery Farm. Irby Library is on Thurstaston Road and was built in the late 1960s on the site of the 18th century Manor Farm. The library has its own group of local volunteers or 'friends'.

==== Public houses ====
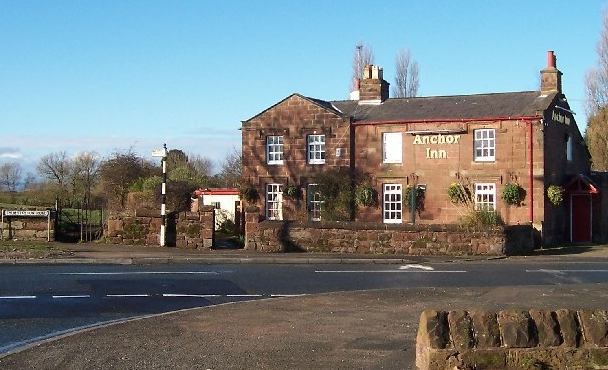
The Anchor Inn, Thurstaston Road

The Anchor Inn is one of the oldest buildings in Irby, and, according to an entry in the BBC Domesday Project, was built as a cottage in the 17th century. The Shippons is on Thingwall Road and is a sandstone village pub, converted from old farm buildings. The Irby Mill is away from the centre of the village, at Irby Hill, towards Greasby. This is a converted miller's cottage constructed in the early 19th century, which had its original windmill demolished in 1898.

==== Parks and commons ====
Arrowe Park is approximately 1 mile (1.6 km) east of the village, and Thurstaston Common is a few hundred metres to the west.

=== Sport ===
Irby has a cricket club situated on Mill Hill Road, which was established in 1948 and promoted to the Cheshire County League in 2001. The club operates four teams every Saturday. In the 2008 season, the 1st team, 2nd team and 3rd team were all promoted. For many years the 3rd and 4th XI's played their home games at the Seaview Lane cricket field until an adjacent field was obtained at the Mill Hill ground.

Irby's local football club has teams ranging from under 8's to men's. Inaugurated in 1992, the senior team won the local league in the 2008/09 season. The team motto reads Semper Paratus meaning 'Always Ready'. In earlier years Irby North End, playing at Seaview, enjoyed some success in the national John White League from 1972 to 1977.

Irby also has its own Taekwon-Do School based at Irby Village Hall with separate adult and children's classes

== Transport ==
The nearest railway station is Heswall (formerly Heswall Hills) on the Borderlands line. Trains depart from here for Wrexham and Bidston. From Irby, accessing the station is difficult via other public transport, and it is approximately a 45-minute walk away and offers only hourly services. Alternatively, buses may be used exclusively or to travel to West Kirby station, which is on the Wirral line of the high-frequency Merseyrail network.

== Notable people ==
- John Aldridge, former Liverpool and Tranmere Rovers footballer.
- Lindsay Kemp, dancer, actor, teacher, mime artist and choreographer, born in Irby on 3 May 1938.
- Frank Lester, recipient of the Victoria Cross.
- Dinah May, English model and actress, born in Irby.
- Colin Whalley, field hockey international.
- Montague White, English cricketer, died in Irby.

== See also ==
- Listed buildings in Irby, Merseyside
