= List of schools in Merseyside =

Schools by Borough
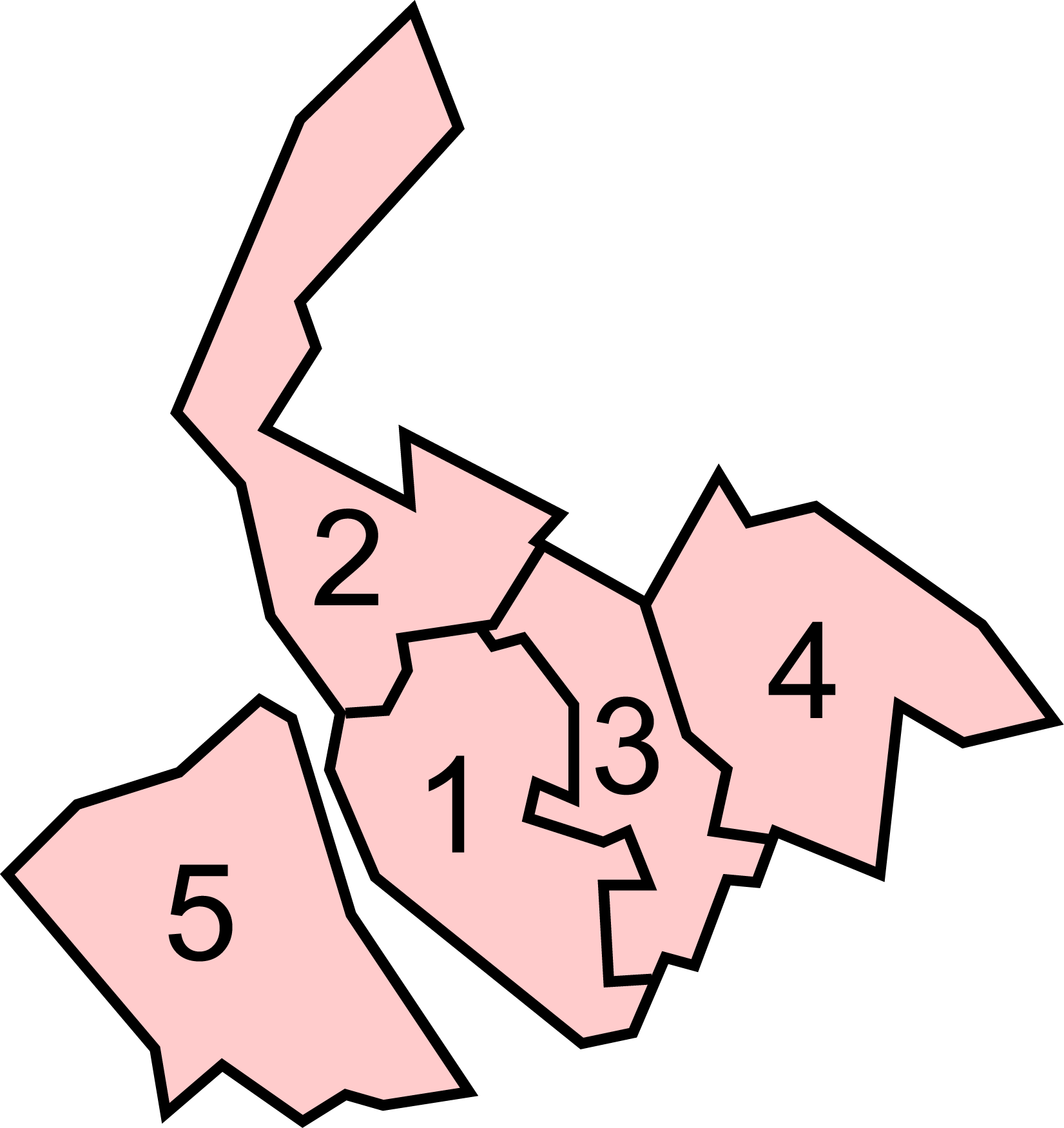
- 1.: Liverpool
- 2.: Sefton
- 3.: Knowsley
- 4.: St Helens
- 5.: Wirral

There is no county-wide local education authority in Merseyside, instead education services are provided by the five smaller metropolitan boroughs of Knowsley, Liverpool, Sefton, St Helens and Wirral:

- List of schools in Knowsley
- List of schools in Liverpool
- List of schools in Sefton
- List of schools in St Helens
- List of schools in Wirral

== See also ==
- Middle Schools in England
- Education in England
- List of UK Independent Schools
- Office for Standards in Education
- List of the oldest schools in the United Kingdom
- List of places in Merseyside
