= Wirral =

Wirral may refer to:

- Wirral Peninsula, a peninsula in the northwest of England, between the rivers Dee and Mersey
- Metropolitan Borough of Wirral in Merseyside, occupying the northern part of the Wirral Peninsula
- Wirral (UK Parliament constituency), a one-seat county constituency between 1885 and 1983
- Hundred of Wirral, the ancient administrative area for The Wirral
- Wirral Rural District, a former local government area of The Wirral between 1894 and 1933
- Wirral Urban District, a former local government area of The Wirral between 1933 and 1974
- Wirral Metropolitan College, a college of Further Education on the Wirral Peninsula
- Wirral-Enniskillen, a community in the Canadian province of New Brunswick named after the Peninsula

== See also ==
- Wirral line, a commuter railway line in Wirral Peninsula
