= Pensby =

Coordinates: 53.338°N 3.095°W

- Village
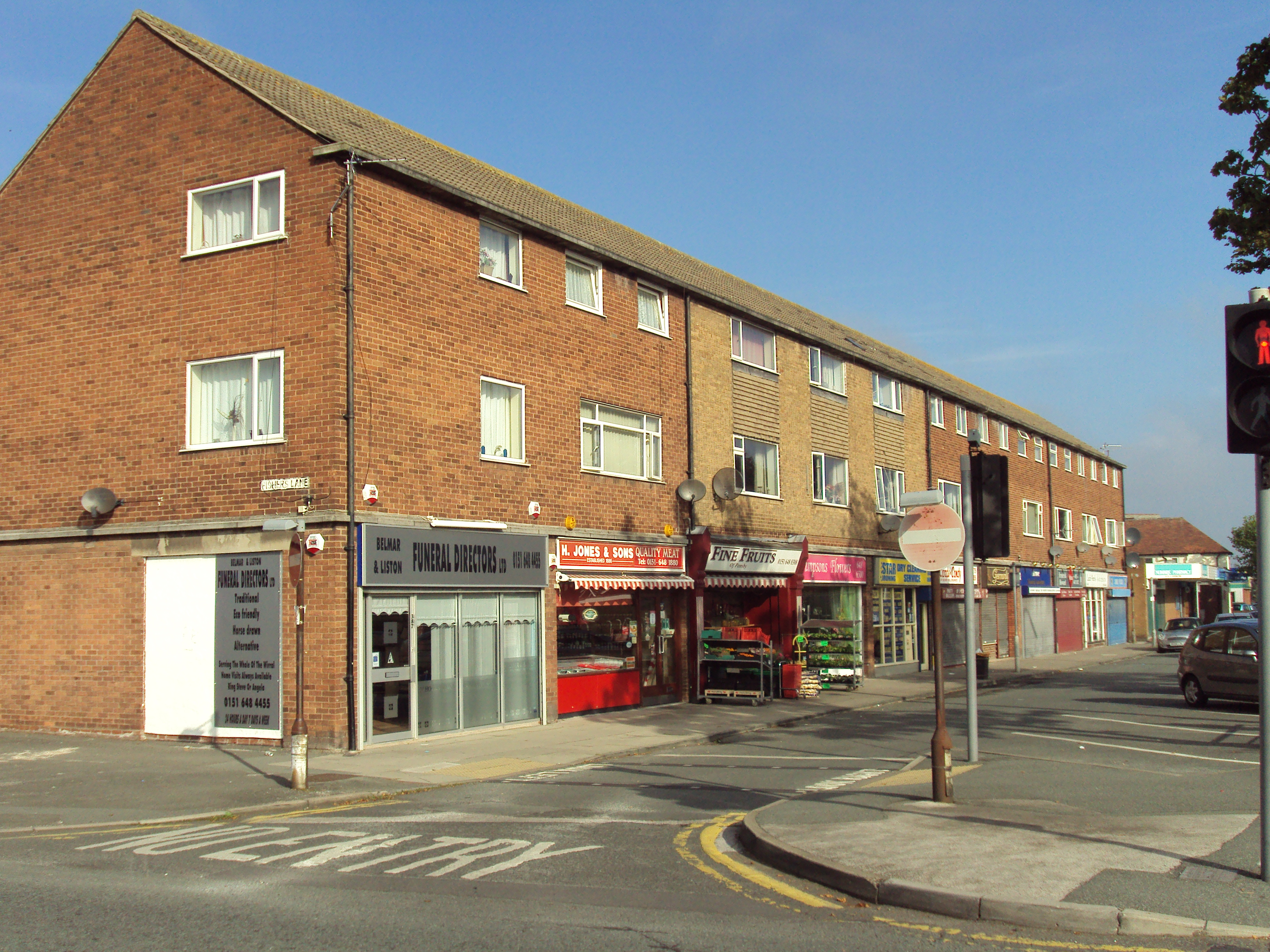
- Shops on the B5138 Pensby Road, at the junction with Fishers Lane

- Location within Merseyside
- Population: 6,900 (2001 census)
- OS grid reference: SJ271829
  - London: 178 mi (286 km) SE
- Metropolitan borough: Wirral
- Metropolitan county: Merseyside
- Region: North West
- Country: England
- Sovereign state: United Kingdom
- Post town: WIRRAL
- Postcode district: CH61
- Dialling code: 0151
- ISO 3166 code: GB-WRL
- Police: Merseyside
- Fire: Merseyside
- Ambulance: North West
- UK Parliament: Wirral West

Pensby (locally /ˈpɛnzbi/) is a large village on the Wirral Peninsula, in Merseyside, England. It is located 1.5 miles (2.4 km) to the north of the town of Heswall and approximately 0.5 miles (0.80 km) to the south west of Thingwall. Historically within Cheshire, the area is part of the Pensby and Thingwall Ward of the Metropolitan Borough of Wirral and is in the parliamentary constituency of Wirral West.

At the 2001 census the village of Pensby had 6,900 inhabitants. The 2011 census measured the population of the Pensby and Thingwall ward at 13,007.

== History ==
The name Pensby comes from Old Norse, meaning a village or settlement at a hill called "Penn". The "by" suffix, included in neighbouring place names such as Frankby, Greasby, and Irby, is Viking in origin. Over time, the name has been spelt variously as Penisby (c.1229), Penlisby (1307) and Pemmesby (1523).

Lower Pensby was previously known as Newtown. This was due to the building of new houses around the turn of the twentieth century at the crossroads of Pensby Road and Gills Lane.

The population of the village over time was recorded at 22 in 1801, 48 in 1901 and increasing significantly to 2,996 by 1951.

== Governance ==
Pensby was formerly a township in the parish of Woodchurch, in the Wirral Hundred. It became a civil parish in 1866. Historically within the county of Cheshire, it was part of the Wirral Rural District from 1894 and Wirral Urban District from 1933. On 1 April 1974 the parish was abolished. Further changes occurred on 1 April 1974, when local government reorganisation resulted in most of Wirral, including Pensby, transfer from Cheshire to the newly formed metropolitan county of Merseyside.

Pensby is represented nationally through the parliamentary constituency of Wirral West. As of 2026, the current Member of Parliament is Matthew Patrick, a Labour representative. At local government level, it is part of a Pensby and Thingwall Ward of the Metropolitan Borough of Wirral. It is represented on Wirral Metropolitan Borough Council by three Labour councillors. The most recent local election in Pensby took place on 4 May 2023.

== Community ==
=== Schools ===
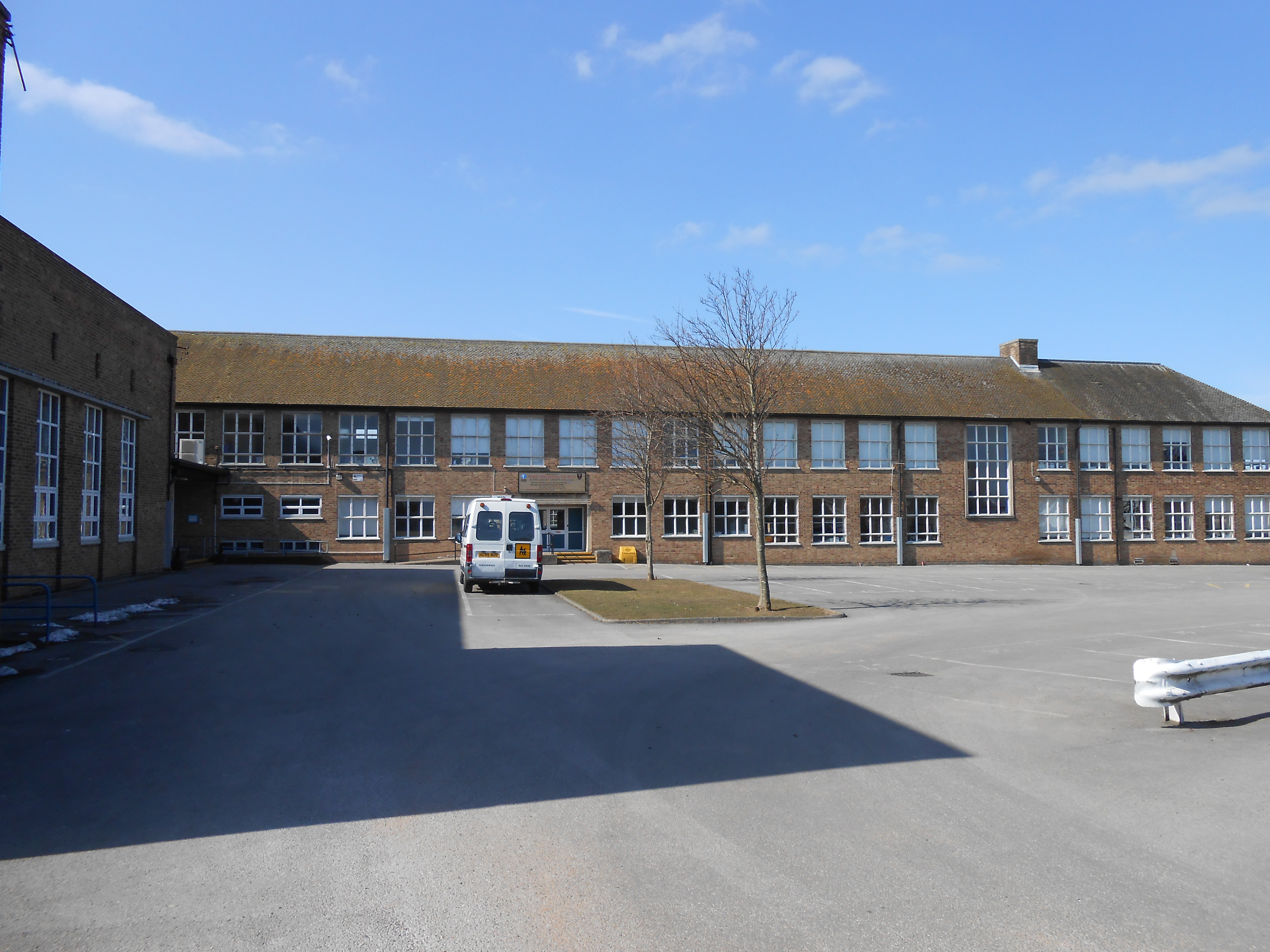
Pensby High School

Pensby's primary schools are Ladymount RC Primary, and Pensby Primary School. The local secondary school is Pensby High School.

=== Churches ===
St. Michael and All Angels Church is a Church of England building on Gills Lane. The Emmanuel Holiness Church is an independent Evangelical ministry which is on Heswall Mount. The Holy Family Catholic Church is on Pensby Road.

=== Leisure ===
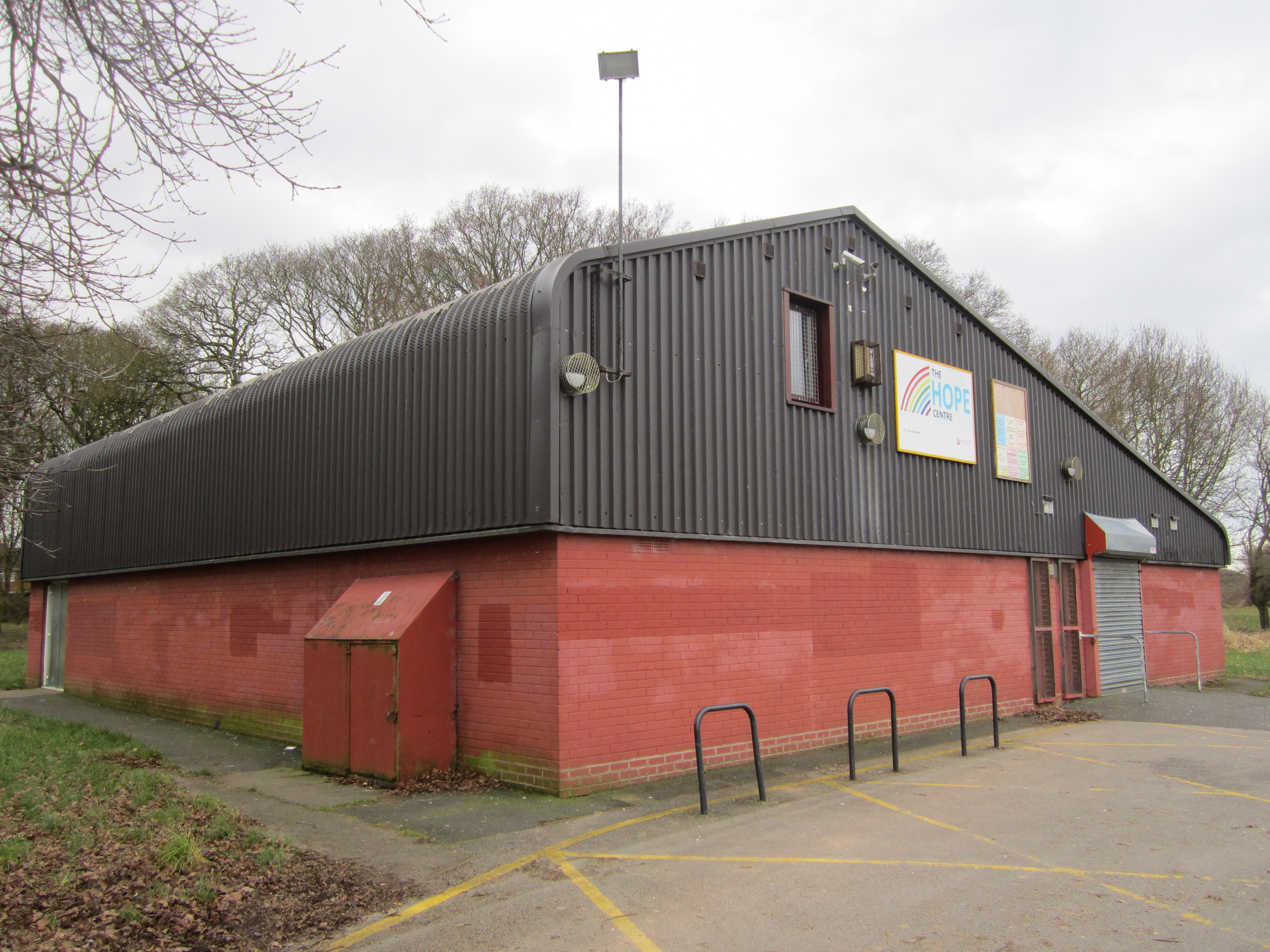
The Hope Centre on Fishers Lane

Pensby has two community centres, the Hope Centre, adjoining Ridgewood Park on Fishers Lane, and the Kylemore Drive Community Centre. There is also an adult day centre on Somerset Road. Pensby Library is on Pensby Road. The 3rd Heswall Scout group is also based in Pensby.

==== Public Houses ====
The Pensby Hotel was the single pub in the village, but after a £500,000 cannabis bust by police, was boarded up and left empty after October 2013. There was a campaign for the building to be listed as a community asset, meaning that the community would have been given six months to prepare a bid for it, which may or may not have been accepted by the owner, but community asset status was rejected by Wirral Council in September 2015. Planning permission was subsequently granted for the demolition of the building and construction of the new care home, and demolition began in October 2016.

==== Parks and Commons ====
Pensby Wood and Ridgewood Park are adjacent to Fishers Lane. Arrowe Park is approximately 1 mile (1.6 km) north of Pensby.

=== Sport ===
The famous Everton FC footballer Dixie Dean played for Pensby Institute in his early days, on the fields at the side of Gills Lane. He was sold to Tranmere Rovers for the fee of a new kit for the team.

Pensby recreation centre and bowling club is on Pensby Road.

== Transport ==
=== Road ===
Pensby is on the B5138 Pensby Road, which connects to the A540 and the A551. Junction 3 of the M53 motorway is within two miles of the village.

=== Rail ===
Heswall railway station on the Borderlands line is located approximately 2 miles (3.2 km) south-east of Pensby and provides services between Wrexham and Bidston.

Pensby Hall

== Landmarks ==
Pensby Hall is a two storeyed red sandstone dwelling with a slate roof. The windows are a mix of casements and sashes, some of which are mullioned. Built in 1688, with some structural additions to the property in the 19th century, it was designated a Grade II listed building in 1962.

== Notable people ==
- The guitarist Karl Benson, from the indie band Half Man Half Biscuit, is from Pensby.
- Actor and filmmaker Andrew Games grew up in Pensby, and was a pupil at Pensby High School from 2005-2010

== See also ==
- Listed buildings in Heswall

== Bibliography ==
- Mortimer, William Williams (1847). The History of the Hundred of Wirral. London: Whittaker & Co. p.288.
