= Ridgeway High School =

Ridgeway High School may refer to:

- Ridgeway High School (Birkenhead) in Merseyside, England
- Ridgeway High School (Memphis, Tennessee) in the United States of America
