= Listed buildings in Irby, Merseyside =

Irby is a village in Wirral, Merseyside, England. It contains three buildings that are recorded in the National Heritage List for England as designated listed buildings, all of which are listed at Grade II. This grade is the lowest of the three gradings given to listed buildings and is applied to "buildings of national importance and special interest". The listed buildings consist of two farmhouses and a country house.

Name and location	Photograph	Date	Notes
Irby Farmhouse; 53.35177°N 3.11843°W		1612	There are two datestones on the farmhouse, one dated 1612 and the other 1731. The farmhouse is mainly in stone, with some brick, and has a slate roof. There are two storeys and an attic, a front of three bays, and a two-storey rear wing. On the front are casement windows, a 20th-century gabled porch, and a central hipped dormer. Some of the windows at the rear are mullioned.
Irby Hall; 53.35094°N 3.11942°W		Early 17th century	A country house with a basic H-shaped plan in two storeys. The façade was replaced in 1888, prior to which it was timber-framed; there is now a lower storey in stone and a timber-framed jettied upper storey. The other sides of the house are in stone. The façade has four bays, the outer bays projecting forward and gabled, and in the third bay is a gabled porch. The windows on the front are transomed and contain casements; elsewhere they are mullioned.
Benty Heath Farmhouse; 53.35241°N 3.09718°W	—	1732	A stone house with a slate roof, in two storeys and three bays, the first bay having been added later. The windows are horizontally-sliding sashes. On the front is a datestone and a 20th-century porch.
