= Frank Lester (VC) =

Recipient of the Victoria Cross

- Born: 18 February 1896; Huyton, Liverpool, England
- Died: 12 October 1918 (aged 22); Neuvilly, France
- Burial place: Neuvilly Communal Cemetery Extension, France
- Military career
- Allegiance: United Kingdom
- Branch: British Army
- Service years: 1916–1918
- Rank: Corporal
- Units: South Lancashire Regiment; The Lancashire Fusiliers
- Conflicts: World War I: Western Front; German spring offensive (WIA); Hundred Days Offensive (DOW)
- Awards: Victoria Cross

Frank Lester VC (18 February 1896 – 12 October 1918) was an English soldier in the British Army during the First World War, and recipient of the Victoria Cross, the highest and most prestigious award for gallantry in the face of the enemy awarded to British Commonwealth forces.

== Life ==
Lester was born on 18 February 1896 in Huyton, near Liverpool, to John and Ellen Lester, Prior to becoming a soldier, he was the organist at the Methodist chapel in Irby. He enlisted in the army in March 1916 and was posted to the 10th Battalion of the South Lancashire Regiment. He was soon promoted to the rank of Sergeant Instructor, training recruits at Prees Heath, Shropshire and Kinmel Park, North Wales. In June 1917 he was transferred at his own request to the Lancashire Fusiliers and in December that year he was drafted to France with the 10th Battalion of that regiment. In going overseas he relinquished the rank of Sergeant Instructor and reverted to Private.

In the winter of 1918, now promoted to corporal, Lester was wounded during the massive German offensive and was sent to Rouen for treatment. On leaving hospital he returned to England to await another posting. After some leave he was sent to Cromer, Norfolk and in September was sent back to the front in France.

== Victoria Cross ==
Lester was part of the British offensive which was steadily pushing the German front line back. They encountered stiff resistance, the Germans were determined to prevent a rout of the "impregnable" Hindenburg Line and fighting for survival. It was 12 October 1918, in driving rain and sleet, that the 22 year-old corporal in the 10th Battalion, The Lancashire Fusiliers performed a deed for which he was awarded the VC.

For most conspicuous bravery and self-sacrifice during the clearing of the village of Neuvilly, on 12th October, 1918, when, with a party of about seven men under an officer, he was the first to enter a house from the back door, and shot 2 Germans as they attempted to get out by the front door. A minute later a fall of masonry blocked the door by which the party had entered. The only exit into the street was under fire at point-blank range. The street was also swept by fire of machine guns at close range. Observing that an enemy sniper was causing heavy casualties to a party in a house across the street, Pte. Lester exclaimed, " I'll settle him," and, dashing out into the street, shot the sniper at close quarters, falling mortally wounded at the same instant. This gallant man well knew it was certain death to go into the street, and the party opposite was faced with the alternative of crossing the fire-swept street or staying where it was and being shot one by one. To save their lives he sacrificed his own.

== Legacy ==
He is at buried in row B, grave 15 in Neuvilly Communal Cemetery Extension, France, located three miles north of Le Cateau. He is also commemorated on the family memorial in the graveyard of the former Holy Trinity Church, Wirral, and on the War Memorial in the graveyard of St Bartholomew's Church, Thurstaston.

His VC is on display in the Lord Ashcroft Gallery at the Imperial War Museum, London.

== Bibliography ==
- Gliddon, Gerald (2014) [2000]. The Final Days 1918. VCs of the First World War. Stroud, Gloucestershire: The History Press. ISBN 978-0-7509-5368-9.
- Murphy, James (2008). Liverpool VCs. Pen and Sword Books. ISBN 978-1844157808.
