= Wirral Urban District =

Former local government area in the UK

Coordinates: 53.3155°N 3.0435°W

Wirral
- Area
  - 1931: 5,639 acres
- Population
  - 1931: 9,599
- History
  - Created: 1933
  - Abolished: 1974
  - Succeeded by: Metropolitan Borough of Wirral
- Status: urban district
  - HQ: Heswall

Wirral Urban District was an urban district in Cheshire, England, from 1933 to 1974. It was created from part of the disbanded Wirral Rural District and covered an area on the south-west side of the Wirral Peninsula. The largest settlement was Heswall, where the urban district council was based. The district was abolished in 1974 to become part of the new Metropolitan Borough of Wirral which covers most of the peninsula.

== History ==
The Wirral Rural District had been created in 1894 to administer the rural parts of the Wirral Poor Law Union. The rural district had subsequently ceded various areas to neighbouring urban districts and boroughs. In 1933, the residual area of the old rural district was converted into an urban district. The new district contained the six civil parishes of Barnston, Gayton, Heswall-cum-Oldfield, Irby, Pensby, and Thurstaston. (Parts of the neighbouring parishes of Arrowe, Brimstage and Thornton Hough were transferred to parishes within the new district at the same time.)

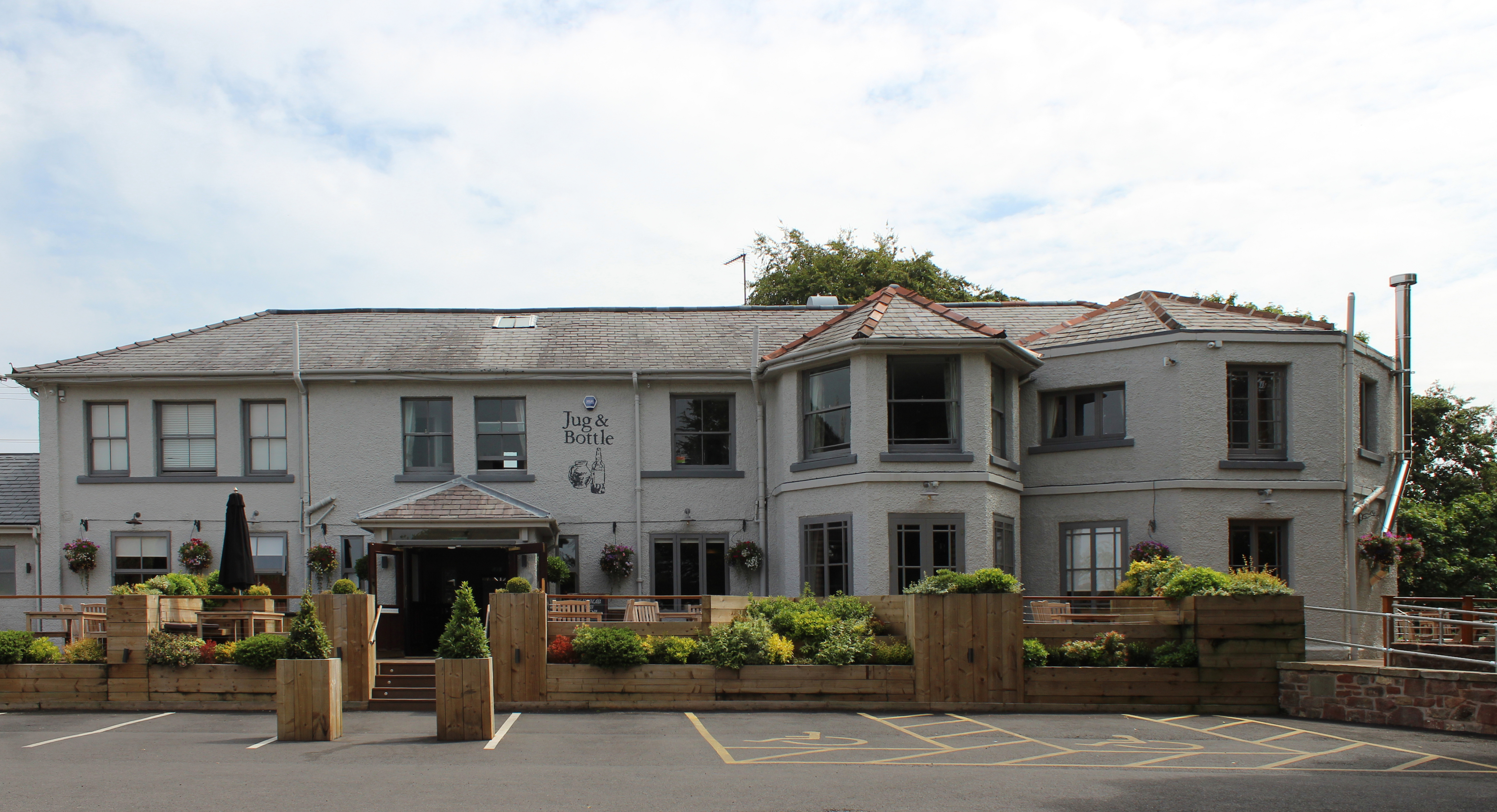
Jug & Bottle, Heswall, formerly Hill House. Headquarters of Wirral Urban District Council from 1936 to 1974

Heswall was the largest settlement in the district, and the urban district council chose to base itself there, buying a large house called Hill House in 1936 to serve as its headquarters.

Wirral Urban District was abolished in 1974 under the Local Government Act 1972. The area became part of the Metropolitan Borough of Wirral in the new county of Merseyside.
