= Arrowe Park =

Area of Wirral, England

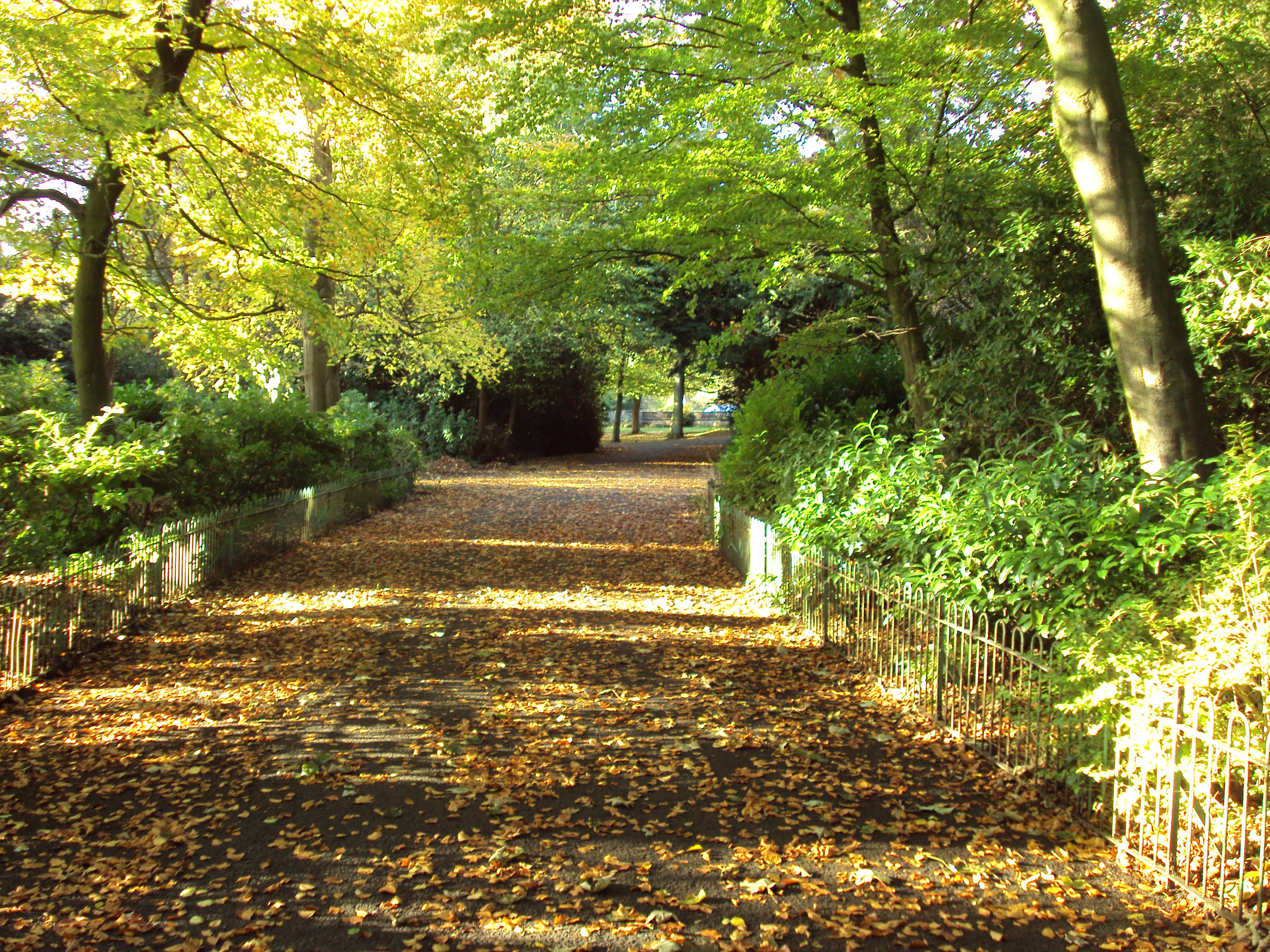
Arrowe Country Park in the Autumn

Arrowe Park, sometimes composited as Arrowepark, is an area 6.5 km (4.0 mi) to the west of Birkenhead, within the Metropolitan Borough of Wirral, Merseyside, England. It is situated on the Wirral Peninsula, adjacent to the Woodchurch housing estate and to the south of the large village of Upton. The location has two landmarks: Arrowe Park Hospital and Arrowe Country Park, along with a number of residences.

Historically within the county of Cheshire, the estate upon which Arrowe Park now lies was founded by John Shaw. His great nephew John Ralph Shaw built Arrowe Hall. Arrowe Park Hospital is a large acute accident and emergency facility that was opened in 1982. The country park was opened in 1926 with a golf club added in the 1930s.

== History ==
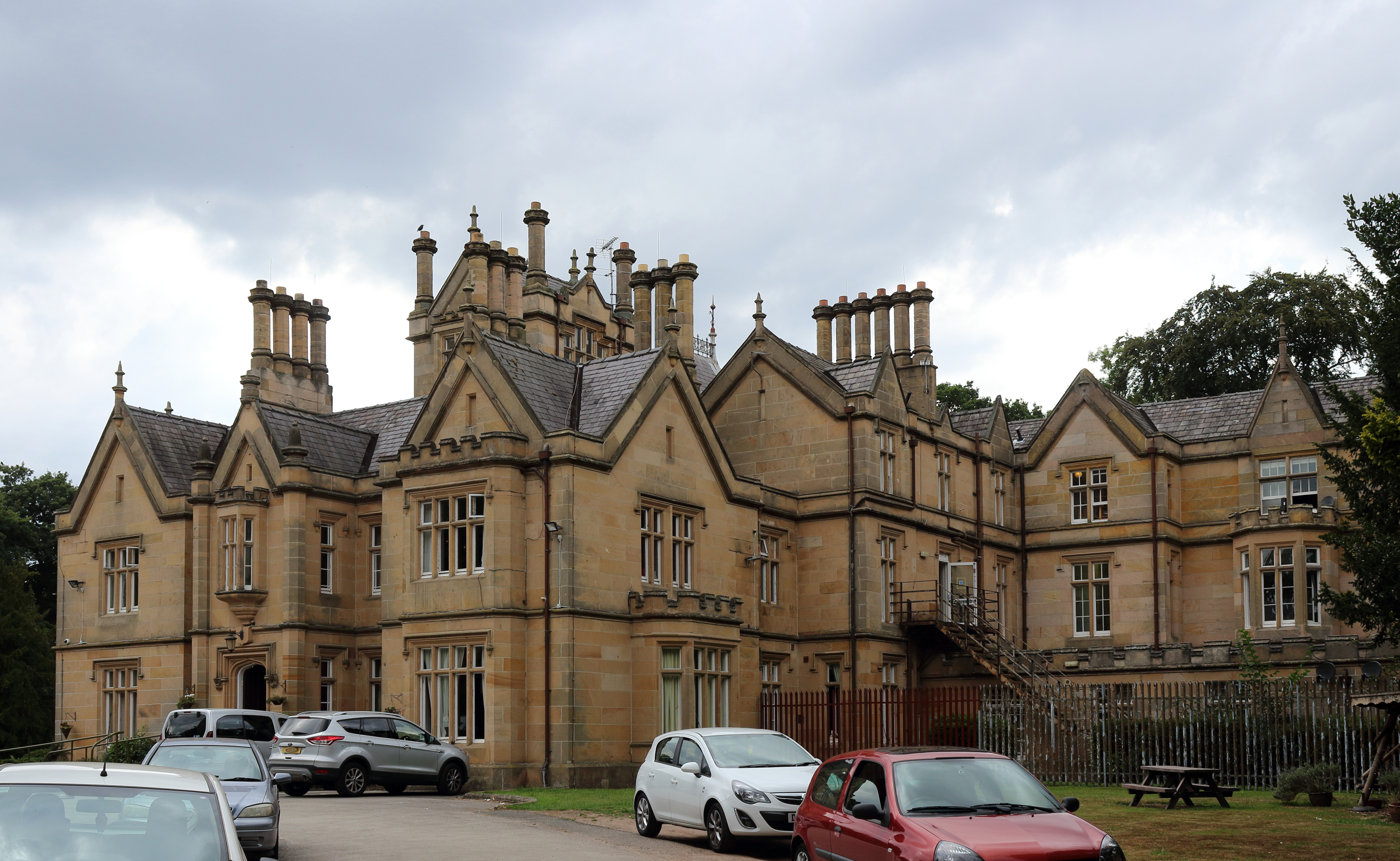
Arrowe Hall

Arrowe was a small village in the central part of the Wirral. The first recorded owner of the land was an Anglo Saxon chief called "Aescwulf". Norse-Gaels were present in the area and the name may derive from the Old Norse erg or the Middle Irish airge (from which the latter derives) meaning "shielling".

In 1240 it was owned by Roger de Montalt, 1st Baron Montalt. There is reference to a watermill in Arrowe in 1347. From the mid 15th century until the 17th century Arrowe was owned by the Dutton family of Dutton, Cheshire, who were declared Lords of Arrowe. During the 18th century many farms sprung up around Arrowe. Arrowe Township was a block of land, east to west, between Arrowe Park Road and Limbo Lane and north to south, from Arrowe Brook Lane and the Arrowe Brook Road area, to Thingwall Road East and Thingwall Road. The township was in the parish of Woodchurch and included the hamlet of Arrowe Park. The population was 96 in 1801, 105 in 1851 and 121 in 1901 but had been abolished by 1933.

In 1807, Liverpool mayor, shipowner and slave trader John Shaw first bought Arrowe House Farm and subsequently more and more of the surrounding land. On his death in 1829 it came into the ownership of his nephew, John Ralph Nicholson Shaw, who built Arrowe Hall in 1835 and had the grounds landscaped to form a country estate, with parkland, a lake and workers' cottages. Arrowe Hall may have been designed by John Cunningham, who certainly made additions. The Hall was extended on several occasions in the later 19th century. The property was handed down to Captain Otho Shaw, a world traveller and collector, who housed numerous items there.

In 1908, Arrowe Hall and Park were acquired by Lord Leverhulme, who sold the estate to Birkenhead Corporation in 1926. Ownership was transferred again on 1 April 1974 from Birkenhead Corporation to the nascent Metropolitan Borough of Wirral local authority.

In 1929, the 3rd World Scout Jamboree was held at Arrowe Park, with over 50,000 scouts and 320,000 visitors. There was a monument in the park which commemorated this event. The monument has now been moved to the entrance to the grounds of Arrowe Park Hospital.

== Landmarks ==
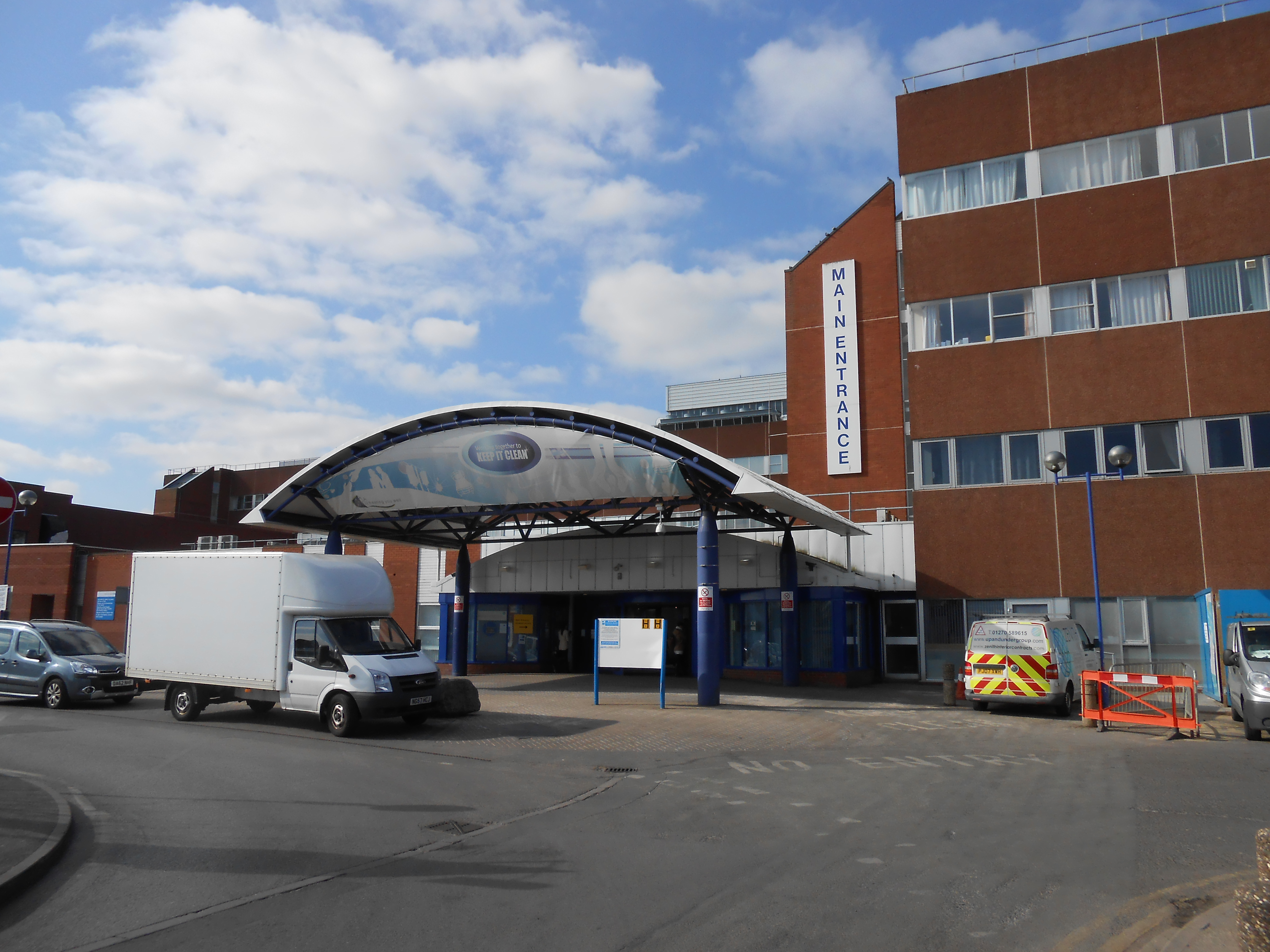
Arrowe Park Hospital

Arrowe Country Park is a country park in the district that was opened in 1926. Arrowe Park Golf Club with an area of 150 acres (61 ha) is within the park and was opened in the 1930s, it consists of a clubhouse and an eighteen hole course. Elsewhere in the park itself, there is a pitch and putt course, footgolf, tennis courts, bowling greens, football pitches and a children's play area. A public house was built in 1994. Arrowe Brook flows along the western edge of the park, from south to north, alongside a path. The brook also incorporates Arrowe Park Lake. Arrowe Hall, a Grade II listed mansion built in the Elizabethan style, is within the park. The hall was sold by the local council in 1997 and now houses a private care centre.

Arrowe Park Hospital is a large, acute hospital, located on a section of Arrowe Park, close to the village of Upton. It was built on 15-acre (6.1 ha) of parkland and officially opened by the Queen in 1982. It is one of three hospitals managed by Wirral University Teaching Hospital NHS Foundation Trust, The maternity and gynaecology wing was later opened by, and dedicated to, the Duchess of Westminster.

== Bibliography ==
- Mortimer, William Williams (1847). The History of the Hundred of Wirral. London: Whittaker & Co. pp283-284.
