= Landican =

Coordinates: 53.361°N 3.078°W

- Hamlet
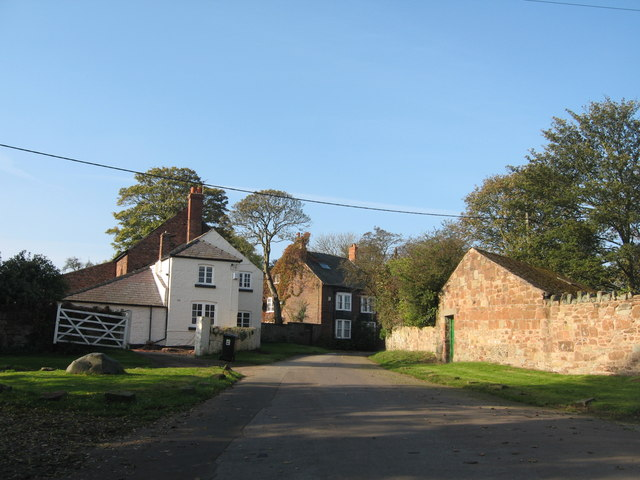
- Houses on Landican Lane

- Location within Merseyside
- Population: 20 (2001 census)
- OS grid reference: SJ283855
  - London: 178 mi (286 km) SE
- Metropolitan borough: Wirral
- Metropolitan county: Merseyside
- Region: North West
- Country: England
- Sovereign state: United Kingdom
- Post town: WIRRAL
- Postcode district: CH49
- Dialling code: 0151
- ISO 3166 code: GB-WRL
- Police: Merseyside
- Fire: Merseyside
- Ambulance: North West
- UK Parliament: Wirral West

Landican (/ˈlændɪkən/) is a hamlet and former civil parish on the outskirts of Birkenhead, in the Metropolitan Borough of Wirral, Merseyside, England. The hamlet is on the Wirral Peninsula, near to Woodchurch and the M53 motorway. Historically part of the county of Cheshire, it is within the local government ward of Pensby and Thingwall and the parliamentary constituency of Wirral West.

Landican consists of a small group of cottages and farm buildings as well as a cemetery and crematorium. At the 2001 census the community had a population of only 20.

== History ==
The name possibly derives from Llan diacon, meaning "church of the deacon", with the llan- prefix being of Welsh origin. However, it does not have a parish church and probably refers to Woodchurch. (Note: In this instance, Llan de chesne would be a Welsh-Norman construct, literally "church [built] of oak (wood)".) Alternatively, the name could refer to the "church of St. Tecan/Tegan", an obscure Welsh saint. Landican has been variously spelt over time, including: Landechene (1086), Landekan (1240), Lankekan (1347) and Lancan (1539). John D. Bu'Lock wrote that the survival of the Celtic-derived names for Landican and nearby Wallasey "in an area where later English and Norse occupation was so intensive is in itself remarkable."

The settlement of Landechene was recorded in the Domesday Book under the ownership of William Malbank and consisting of 21 households (nine villagers, seven smallholders, one priest and four Frenchmen).

The hamlet was a township in Woodchurch Parish of the Wirral Hundred, which became a civil parish in 1866. From 1894 Landican was administered as part of Wirral Rural District before being absorbed into the County Borough of Birkenhead in 1928. The civil parish was abolished on 1 April 1933 and merged with Birkenhead St Mary. The population was recorded at 45 in 1801, 57 in 1851, 71 in 1901 and 66 in 1931.

On 19 October 1944, a United States Air Force B-24 Liberator bomber from the 703rd Bomb Squadron, 445th Bomb Group based at RAF Tibenham, was on a familiarisation flight when it exploded in mid-air. The bomber crashed near the hamlet with the loss of all 24 people on board. In 1996 a large stone memorial to those who died was erected at the nearby North Cheshire Trading Estate in Prenton.

== Geography ==
Landican is in the central part of the Wirral Peninsula, approximately 6 km (3.7 mi) south-south-east of the Irish Sea at Leasowe Lighthouse, 5 km (3.1 mi) east-north-east of the Dee Estuary at Thurstaston and 5 km (3.1 mi) west-south-west of the River Mersey at Tranmere Oil Terminal. Landican is situated between Thurstaston Hill and the Bidston to Storeton ridge, with the centre of the hamlet at an elevation of about 44 m (144 ft) above sea level.

== Landican Cemetery ==
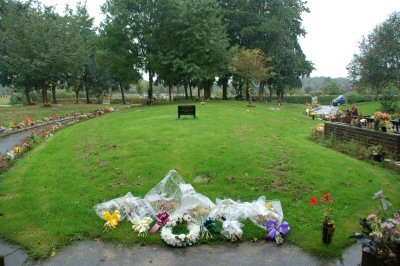
The Garden of Remembrance, Landican Cemetery

Landican Cemetery is situated opposite Arrowe Park and is one of the main cemetery and crematorium sites for the Metropolitan Borough of Wirral. Opening on 22 October 1934, the site now consists of nearly 30 hectares (74 acres). A large population of European hares are known to inhabit the cemetery grounds.

There are 125 Commonwealth service war graves of World War II in the cemetery, 35 of them in a war graves plot, and include two unidentified sailors of the Royal Navy and an unidentified airman. In addition, a Screen Wall memorial opposite the Cross of Sacrifice at the plot lists 38 service personnel of the same war who were cremated at the crematorium.

Other individuals buried or cremated there include:

- Olaf Stapledon (1886–1950), philosopher and science-fiction author (ashes scattered near Dee Estuary).
- Brigadier Sir Philip Toosey (1904–1975), who while prisoner-of-war of the Japanese in World War II was the officer in charge of building the Bridge on the River Kwai.
- Lieutenant-Commander Ian Edward Fraser (1920–2008), VC winner, World War II, diver.

== Bibliography ==
- Mortimer, William Williams (1847). The History of the Hundred of Wirral. London: Whittaker & Co. pp284-285.
