= Noctorum =

Coordinates: 53.38°N 3.0753°W

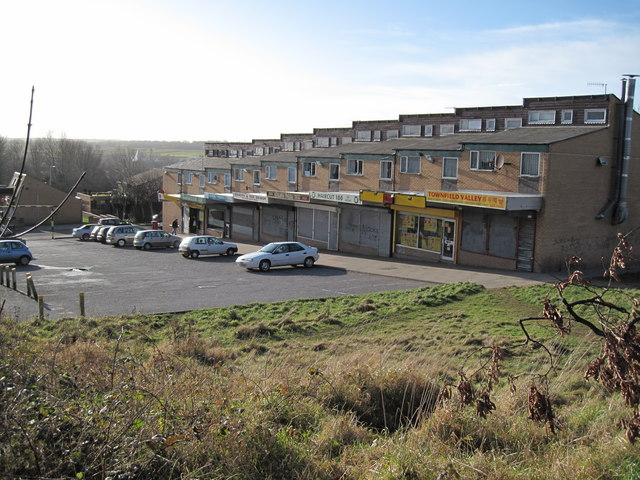
- Shops adjoining Townfield Close

- Location within Merseyside
- Population: 4,990 (2001 census)
- OS grid reference: SJ285875
  - London: 179 mi (288 km) SE
- Metropolitan borough: Wirral
- Metropolitan county: Merseyside
- Region: North West
- Country: England
- Sovereign state: United Kingdom
- Post town: PRENTON
- Postcode district: CH43
- Dialling code: 0151
- ISO 3166 code: GB-WRL
- Police: Merseyside
- Fire: Merseyside
- Ambulance: North West
- UK Parliament: Birkenhead

Noctorum is a suburb of Birkenhead, Merseyside, England. Administratively it is within the Metropolitan Borough of Wirral as part of Claughton Ward. Noctorum is in the north east of the Wirral Peninsula, bounded by the Beechwood estate to the north, Claughton and Oxton to the east and south east, and the River Fender and M53 motorway to the west.

Due to a redefining of post towns by the Royal Mail in 2003, Noctorum is identified as being within Prenton (which is in fact a geographically separate suburb of Birkenhead). However, this change was purely for postal services and Noctorum remains a part of Birkenhead.

At the 2001 census the population of Noctorum was 4,990. For the 2011 census no population figures specific to Noctorum were available. However the total population of Claughton Ward, which includes Noctorum, was 14,705.

== History ==
It has been suggested that the name Noctorum is Old Irish in origin, originally Cnocc Tírim, meaning "Dry Hill". This may be in reference to Bidston Hill, on which Noctorum is situated on its western slope. The name may long pre-date the Norse-Irish settlement in the early 10th century and go back to a Hibernian settlement of the west coast in the Sub-Roman period (early 5th century).

Noctorum appears as Chenoterie (Norman French) in the Domesday Book. "Chêne" (French for oak) may be used here, as in the Wirral hamlet of Landican (Old Welsh/Brythonic) called Landechene, the Oak Enclosure in the Norman French of Domesday Book.

Noctorum was a township of the parish of Woodchurch, in the Wirral Hundred. In 1866, Noctorum became a separate civil parish until 1 April 1933, when the parish was abolished and merged with Birkenhead St Mary. In the same year, Noctorum was subsumed into the County Borough of Birkenhead, within the county of Cheshire. On 1 April 1974, local government reorganisation in England and Wales resulted in most of the Wirral Peninsula, including Noctorum, transfer from the county of Cheshire to the nascent county of Merseyside.

The population of Noctorum was recorded at 17 in 1801, 32 in 1851, 212 in 1901 and 473 in 1931. In the 2001 census, it stood at 4,990.

== Geography ==
Noctorum is in the northern part of the Wirral Peninsula, approximately 4.5 km (2.8 mi) south-south-east of the Irish Sea at Leasowe, 6.5 km (4.0 mi) east-north-east of the Dee Estuary at Caldy and 4 km (2.5 mi) west of the River Mersey at Tranmere. Noctorum is situated on the western side of the Bidston to Storeton ridge, with the area at an elevation of between 10–60 m (33–197 ft) above sea level.

== Governance ==
Noctorum is within the parliamentary constituency of Birkenhead. The current Member of Parliament is Mick Whitley, a Labour representative. He has been the MP since 2019.

At local government level, Noctorum is incorporated into the Claughton Ward of the Metropolitan Borough of Wirral, in the metropolitan county of Merseyside. It is represented on Wirral Metropolitan Borough Council by three councillors.

== Landmarks ==
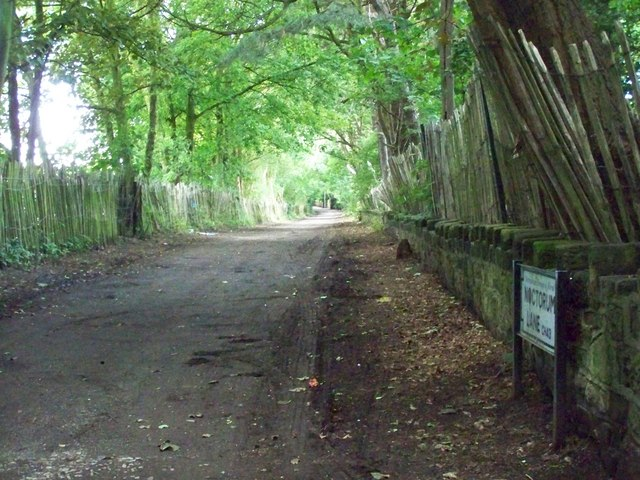
Noctorum Lane

Noctorum Lane is the site of the Grade II listed buildings Mere Hall and Rathmore. Both large houses were designed by Edmund Kirby and built in the 1880s.

== Community ==
Ridgeway High School and the Discovery City Learning Centre (containing Ridgeway Library) are situated within this suburb. There is also a large council estate located here.

== Transport ==
Upton railway station is the nearest station to Noctorum. It is located on the Borderlands line between Bidston and Wrexham.

== See also ==
- Listed buildings in Noctorum

== Bibliography ==
- Mortimer, William Williams (1847). The History of the Hundred of Wirral. London: Whittaker & Co. p.286.
