= Listed buildings in Noctorum =

Noctorum is a suburb of Birkenhead, Wirral, Merseyside, England. It contains five buildings that are recorded in the National Heritage List for England as designated listed buildings, all of which are listed at Grade II. This grade is the lowest of the three gradings given to listed buildings and is applied to "buildings of national importance and special interest". The listed buildings are all large houses, or buildings associated with large houses.

Name and location	Photograph	Date	Notes
Mere Hall; 53.37977°N 3.06165°W	—	1879–82	A large house, later divided into flats, by Edmund Kirby in Jacobethan style. It is in brick with a tiled roof, and has two storeys and attics. The house consists of a main block of four bays, with a cross wing to the left and an advanced wing to the right. It has a stone porch with an entablature carried on large consoles. Other features include mullioned and transomed windows, gabled dormers with pyramidal roofs, a full-height bay window with a conical roof, and stair turrets, also with conical roofs.
Gate piers and wall, Mere Hall; 53.37985°N 3.06094°W	—	c. 1880	The gate piers and wall were probably designed by Edmund Kirby. They are in sandstone. The gate piers has an irregular octagonal plan, and have moulded caps; they contain double gates.
Lodge, Mere Hall; 53.38049°N 3.06255°W	—	c. 1880	The lodge was probably designed by Edmund Kirby. It is in 1 1/2 storeys, the lower part is in brick, and the upper part is jettied and plastered with applied timbering. The lodge has a tiled roof, and there is a single-storey rear extension. The gabled porch is timber-framed with bulbous pilasters, and above the doorway is a Venetian window. At the rear is a gabled dormer containing another Venetian window. The other windows are mullioned, and there is a canted oriel window with a projecting gable.
Rathmore; 53.38432°N 3.06605°W		1880s	A large house by Edmund Kirby in simplified Jacobean style. It is in brick with stone dressings and some timber-framing, and it has a tiled roof. The house has two storeys with attics. The windows are mullioned and transomed. Features include timber-framed gables, an octagonal stair turret, and canted bay windows.
Lodge, Bidston Court; 53.39255°N 3.07641°W		c. 1891	The lodge was designed by Grayson and Ould. It is in brick, partly stuccoed with pargeted panels, and has a decorative tiled roof. There are two storeys, the upper storey being jettied, and there are three chimney stacks with spiral fluting. The lodge has two bays, the right bay being gabled and containing an Ipswich window in each storey. (Note: Bidston Court was moved and rebuilt as Hill Bark in Frankby.)

== Notes and references ==
Notes

Citations

Sources

- Historic England, "Mere Hall, Noctorum (1291909)", National Heritage List for England
- Historic England, "Gatepiers and adjoining wall to E of Mere Hall, Noctorum (1201560)", National Heritage List for England
- Historic England, "Lodge to Mere Hall, Noctorum (1291911)", National Heritage List for England
- Historic England, "Rathmore, Noctorum (1291876)", National Heritage List for England
- Historic England, "Bidston Court Lodge, Noctorum (1219035)", National Heritage List for England
- Historic England, Listed Buildings
- Pollard, Richard; Pevsner, Nikolaus (2006), Lancashire: Liverpool and the South-West, The Buildings of England, New Haven and London: Yale University Press, ISBN 0-300-10910-5
