= Montague White =

English cricketer

Montague Eric White (21 January 1908 – 21 June 1970) was an English professional first-class cricketer. He was a right-handed batsman and right arm fast-medium bowler who played 34 times for Worcestershire between 1931 and 1934.

He took 66 wickets at 31.45; his best performance came on debut against Northamptonshire, when he claimed 5–34 in the first innings.

He was born in London, and died at the age of 62 in Irby, which was then in Cheshire.
