= Life Wirral =

Independent school in Merseyside, England

Coordinates: 53°26′16.3″N 3°02′41.5″W

Life Wirral Sports School

Location
- 126 Victoria Road; Wirral, Merseyside, CH45 9LD; United Kingdom

Information
- Type: Independent; Public school Special Educational Needs (SEN)
- Status: Closed
- Authority: Wirral
- Oversight: Ofsted
- Headmistress: Mrs Sarah Quilty
- Website: lifewirral.com

Life Wirral School was an independent educational institution located in Wallasey, England, catering specifically to children with special educational needs (SEN). It opened in April 2021 with a capacity for 20 children. The school aimed to provide tailored educational support to secondary school-age children with a variety of mental illnesses and learning disabilities. As of 2022 the day school fee was £50,000 a year.

== Ofsted ratings ==
The school was last formally rated as "good" by Ofsted in 2022, with a 2023 report indicating that the requirements checked had been met.

== 2024 closure ==
In 2024, an undercover investigation by BBC Panorama revealed serious allegations of abuse and misconduct by senior staff at Life Wirral School. An undercover reporter spent nearly seven weeks at the school and documented multiple instances of staff using offensive language, mocking pupils for their learning disabilities, and physically manhandling them. After this, the school closed.

Staff were recorded using derogatory terms and making homophobic, sexist and ableist remarks towards students. They mocked students for their disabilities, including their tics and high-pitched noises.

The reporter witnessed staff placing students in dangerous headlocks and manhandling them. One staff member was recorded describing how he fantasised about drowning a pupil and referred to him as a "little serial killer."

The school's CEO, Alastair Saverimutto, a former police officer and professional rugby player, admitted to using police-style restraints on children. He had been sacked from the police for gross misconduct. He has been accused of using school and council funding to support businesses run by his family.

The school's head of operations, Paul Hamill, was recorded making violent and aggressive remarks about students.

Elliott Millar, a sports coach at the school, was convicted of assaulting pupils.

Since its opening in 2021, Life Wirral School has received over £2.2 million from Wirral Metropolitan Borough Council. The council paid the school nearly £1 million last year alone. Despite warnings about ongoing problems, the council continued to fund the school.
