= List of schools in Knowsley =

This is a list of schools in the Metropolitan Borough of Knowsley in the English county of Merseyside.

== State-funded schools ==
=== Primary schools ===
- Blacklow Brow School, Huyton
- Cronton CE Primary Academy, Cronton
- Eastcroft Park School, Kirkby
- Evelyn Community Primary School, Prescot
- Halewood CE Primary Academy, Halewood
- Halsnead Primary School, Whiston
- Holy Family RC Primary School, Cronton
- Holy Family RC Primary School, Halewood
- Hope RC/CE Primary School, Huyton
- Huyton With Roby CE Primary School, Huyton
- Kirkby CE Primary School, Kirkby
- Knowsley Lane Primary School, Huyton
- Knowsley Village School, Knowsley
- Malvern Primary School, Huyton
- Millbrook Community Primary School, Westvale
- Northwood Community Primary School, Kirkby
- Our Lady's RC Primary School, Prescot
- Park Brow Community Primary School, Kirkby
- Park View Academy, Huyton
- Plantation Primary School, Halewood
- Prescot Primary School, Prescot
- Ravenscroft Community Primary School, Kirkby
- Roby Park Primary School, Huyton
- St Aidan's RC Primary School, Huyton
- St Albert's RC Primary School, Stockbridge Village
- St Aloysius RC Primary School, Roby
- St Andrew the Apostle RC Primary School, Halewood
- St Anne's RC Primary School, Huyton
- St Brigid's RC Primary School, Stockbridge Village
- St Columba's RC Primary School, Huyton
- St Gabriel's CE Primary School, Huyton
- St John Fisher RC Primary School, Knowsley
- St Joseph the Worker RC Primary School, Kirkby
- St Joseph's RC Primary School, Huyton
- St Laurence's RC Primary School, Kirkby
- St Leo's and Southmead RC Primary School, Whiston
- St Luke's RC Primary School, Prescot
- St Margaret Mary's RC Infant School, Swanside
- St Margaret Mary's RC Junior School, Swanside
- St Marie's RC Primary School, Kirkby
- St Mark's RC Primary School, Halewood
- St Mary and St Paul's CE Primary School, Prescot
- St Michael and All Angels RC Primary School, Kirkby
- Ss Peter and Paul RC Primary School, Kirkby
- Stockbridge Village Primary School, Stockbridge Village
- Sylvester Primary Academy, Huyton
- Westvale Primary School, Kirkby
- Whiston Willis Primary Academy, Whiston
- Willow Tree Primary School, Huyton
- Yew Tree Primary Academy, Halewood

=== Secondary schools ===
- All Saints Catholic High School, Kirkby
- Halewood Academy, Halewood
- Kirkby High School, Kirkby
- Lord Derby Academy, Huyton
- The Prescot School, Prescot
- St Edmund Arrowsmith Catholic Academy, Whiston

=== Special and alternative schools ===
- Alt Bridge School, Huyton
- Bluebell Park School, Kirkby
- Finch Woods Academy, Halewood
- Knowsley Central School, Huyton
- Meadow Park School, Stockbridge Village

=== Further education ===
- Knowsley Community College
- C.F. Mott College of Education

== Independent schools ==
=== Special and alternative schools ===
- ARTS Education, Huyton
- Lawrence House School, Huyton
- Peregrinate School, Westvale
