= List of schools in St Helens =

This is a list of schools in the Metropolitan Borough of St Helens in the English county of Merseyside.

== State-funded schools ==
=== Primary schools ===
- Allanson Street Primary School, Parr
- Ashurst Primary School, Blackbrook
- Bleak Hill Primary School, Windle
- Broad Oak Community Primary School, Parr
- Carr Mill Primary School, Moss Bank
- Chapel End Primary School, Billinge
- Corpus Christi RC Primary School, Rainford
- The District CE Primary School, Newton-le-Willows
- Eaves Primary School, Sutton
- Eccleston Lane Ends Primary School, Eccleston
- Eccleston Mere Primary School, Eccleston
- Garswood Primary and Nursery School, Garswood
- Grange Valley Primary School, Haydock
- Haydock English Martyrs' RC Primary School, Haydock
- Holy Cross RC Primary School, St Helens
- Holy Spirit RC Primary School, Parr
- Legh Vale Primary School, Haydock
- Longton Lane Community Primary School, Rainhill
- Lyme Community Primary School, Newton-le-Willows
- Merton Bank Primary School, Merton Bank
- Newton-le-Willows Primary School, Newton-le-Willows
- Nutgrove Methodist Primary School, Nutgrove
- Oakdene Primary School, Rainhill
- Parish CE Primary School, St Helens
- Queen's Park CE/URC Primary School, Dentons Green
- Rainford Brook Lodge Community Primary School, Rainford
- Rainford CE Primary School, Rainford
- Rectory CE Primary School, North Ashton
- Rivington Primary School, Dentons Green
- Robins Lane Community Primary School, Sutton
- St Aidan's CE Primary School, Billinge
- St Anne's RC Primary School, Sutton
- St Ann's CE Primary School, Rainhill
- St Austin's RC Primary School, Nutgrove
- St Bartholomew's RC Primary School, Rainhill
- St James's CE Primary School, Haydock
- St John Vianney RC Primary School, Thatto Heath
- St Julie's RC Primary School, Eccleston
- St Mary & St Thomas' CE Primary School, St Helens
- St Mary's RC Infant School, Newton-le-Willows
- St Mary's RC Junior School, Newton-le-Willows
- St Mary's RC Primary School, Billinge
- St Mary's RC Primary School, Blackbrook
- St Peter and St Paul RC Primary School, Haresfinch
- St Peter's CE Primary School, Newton-le-Willows
- St Teresa's RC Primary School, Dentons Green
- St Theresa's RC Primary School, Sutton
- St Thomas of Canterbury RC Primary School, Windle
- Sherdley Primary School, Sutton
- Sutton Manor Community Primary School, Sutton
- Sutton Oak CE Primary School, Sutton
- Thatto Heath Community Primary School, Thatto Heath
- Wargrave CE Primary School, Newton-le-Willows
- Willow Tree Primary School, Sutton

=== Secondary schools ===
- Cowley International College, Windle
- De La Salle School, Eccleston
- Hope Academy, Newton-le-Willows
- Outwood Academy Haydock, Haydock
- Rainford High School, Rainford
- Rainhill High School, Rainhill
- St Augustine of Canterbury Catholic Academy, Blackbrook
- St Cuthbert's Catholic High School, Sutton
- The Sutton Academy, Sutton

=== Special and alternative schools ===
- Lansbury Bridge School, Parr
- Launchpad Centre, St Helens
- Mill Green School, Parr
- Pace, Broad Oak
- Penkford School, Newton-le-Willows
- Willow Bank School, Newton-le-Willows

=== Further education ===
- Carmel College
- St Helens College

== Independent schools ==
=== Senior and all-through schools ===
- Tower College, Rainhill

=== Special and alternative schools ===
- Ash Meadow School, Sutton
- Nugent House School, Billinge
- This Is My Education - TIME, St Helens
- Wargrave House School & College, Newton-le-Willows
