= Dee Cliffs =

Cliffs in Merseyside, England

- Site of Special Scientific Interest
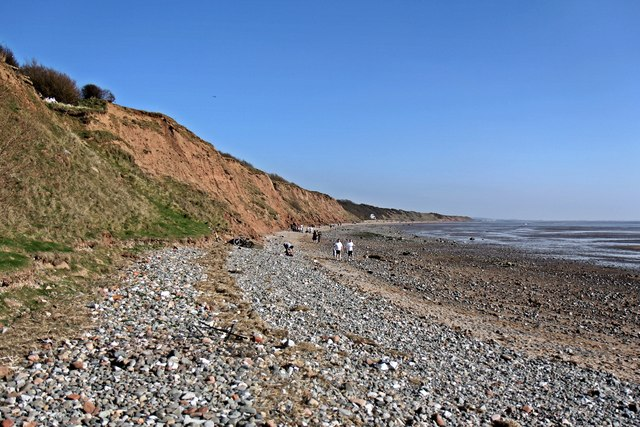

- Location within Merseyside
- Location of Dee Cliffs.
- Area of search: Merseyside
- Grid reference: SJ238832
- Coordinates: 53.343°N 3.151°W
- Interest: Geological
- Area: 14.39 ha (35.6 acres)
- Notification date: 1979 / 1983

Dee Cliffs (SSSI) is an area of cliffs on the eastern side of the Dee Estuary and to the west of Thurstaston on the Wirral Peninsula, England.

The area contains the best known example of clay cliff and bank habitat in Merseyside. The area also has some marl pits, which have a rich flora and fauna and an area of herb-rich neutral grassland.

== Gallery ==
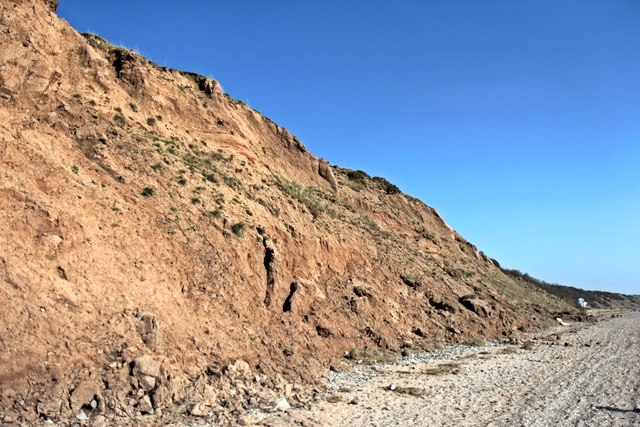
Cliff face at Thurstaston

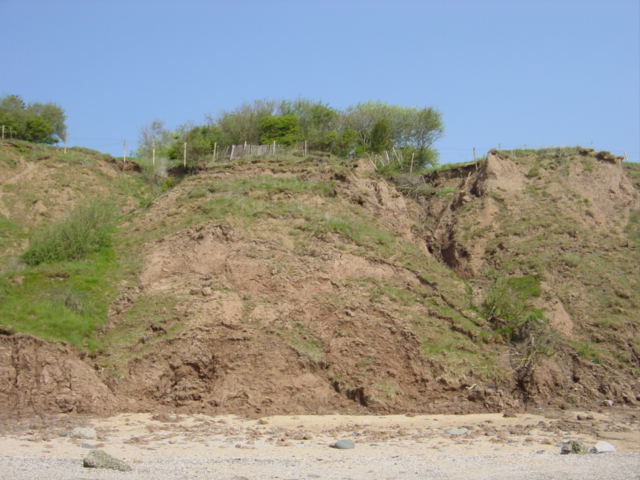
Coastal erosion

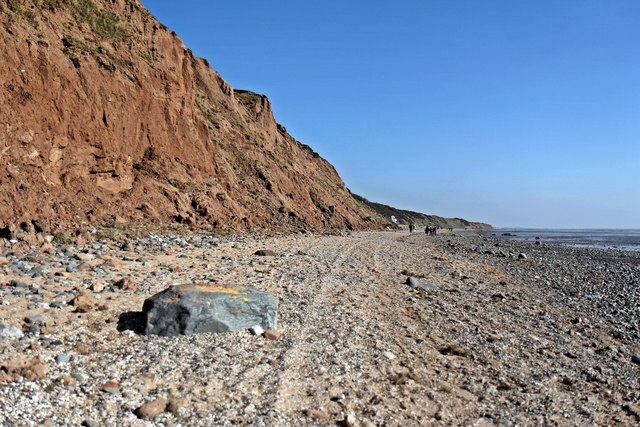
Boulder deposition

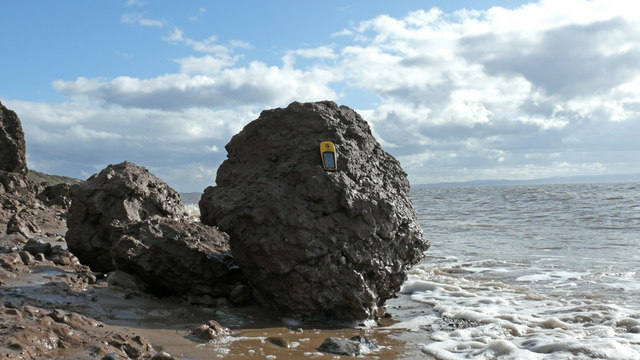
Boulder clay at Thurstaston
