= Irby Hall =

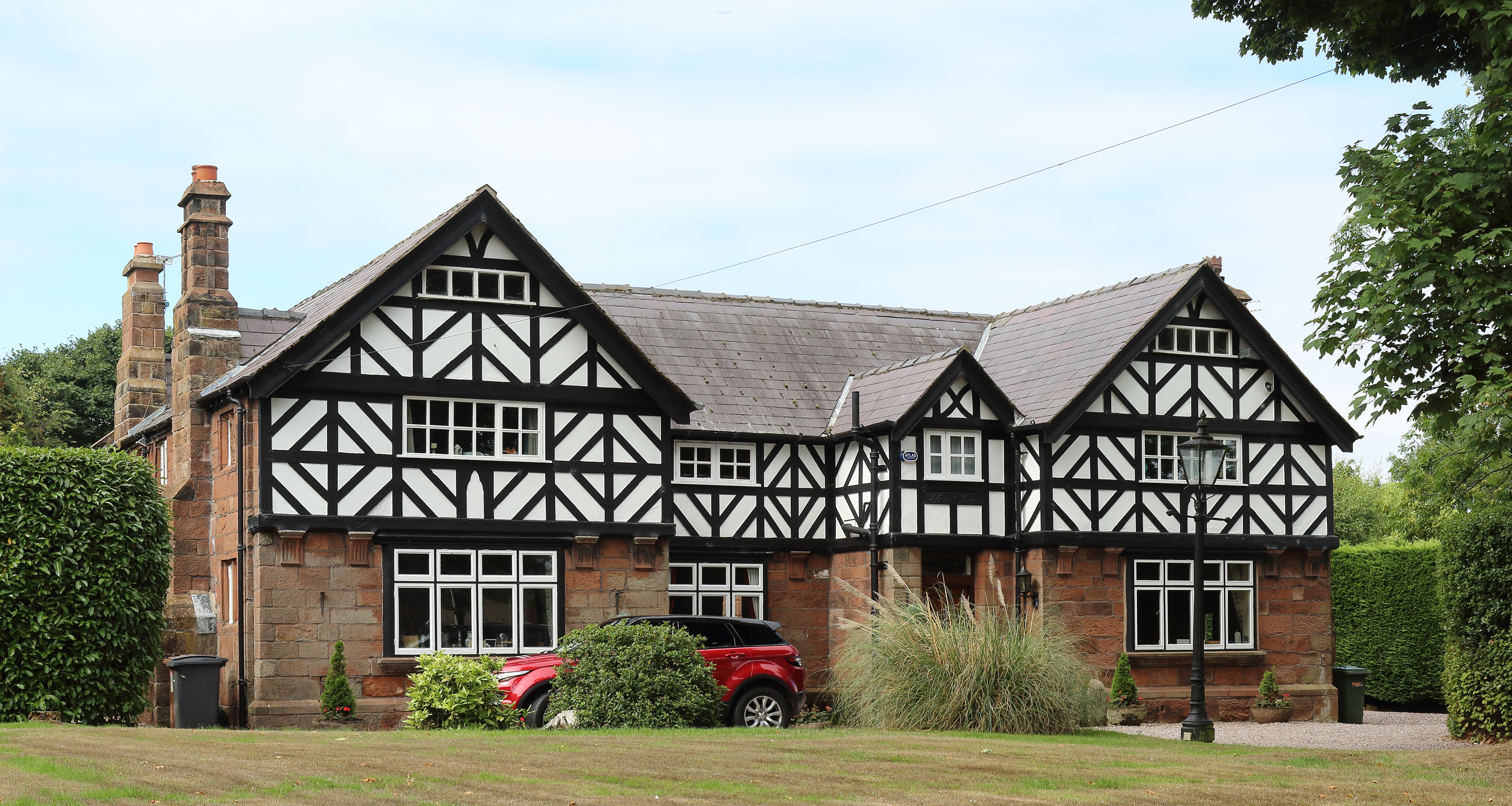
- Irby Hall

- Location in Merseyside
- 53.3509°N 3.1194°W
- Location: Near Irby, Wirral, England
- OS grid reference: SJ 444 938

History
- Built: 17th century

Site notes
- Area: Irby, Wirral

Listed Building – Grade II
- Designated: 15 November 1962
- Reference no.: 1075368

Irby Hall is a 17th-century Grade II listed manor house located in Irby, Wirral. Built upon a former 11th century manor and courthouse of St Werburgh Abbey and surrounded by a moat the overall site has been designated as a Scheduled monument.
