= Ridgeway High School, Birkenhead =

Secondary school in Birkenhead, Merseyside, England

Ridgeway High School
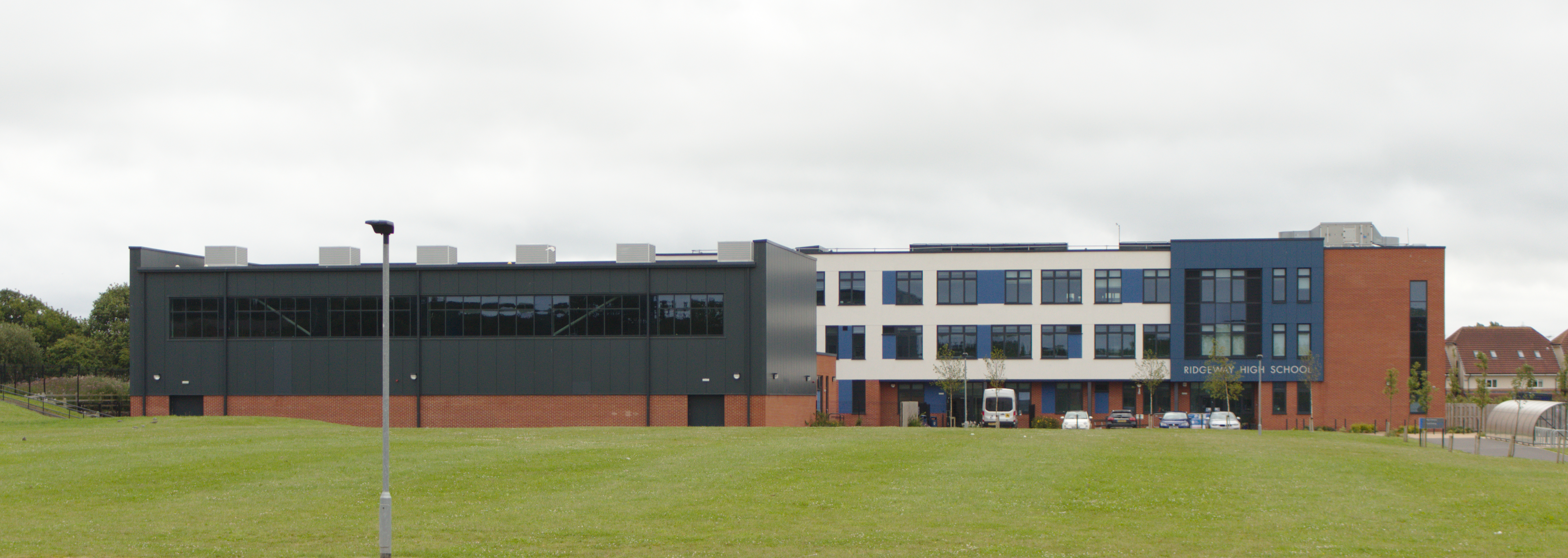
- Ridgeway following the 2017 rebuild

Location
- Noctorum Avenue; Birkenhead; Metropolitan Borough of Wirral, Merseyside, CH43 9EB; England; 53°22′47″N 3°04′22″W

Information
- Type: Foundation school
- Established: 1974
- Local authority: Wirral
- Department for Education URN: 105097 Tables
- Ofsted: Reports
- Head teacher: Gavin Sterry
- Staff: 226
- Gender: Co-educational
- Age: 11 to 16
- Enrolment: 903
- Colours: Navy blue and red
- Website: www.ridgeway.wirral.sch.uk

Ridgeway High School is a co-educational, comprehensive school in Noctorum, Birkenhead, on the Wirral Peninsula in England. The school caters for pupils between the ages of 11 and 16, from within the Local Authority area of the Metropolitan Borough of Wirral, primarily Noctorum, Prenton, and Oxton.

== History and rebuild ==
Ridgeway was built in the 1970s as a two-storey building with a single-storey gymnasium. In the 1990s, an extension was added to the existing building to accommodate the school's language programs. At that point, Ridgeway could hold 825 pupils. In 2013, the school was selected by the Education and Skills Funding Agency to be 1 of 12 northwest schools to be rebuilt over the next several years. The £12m rebuild was finished in late 2017.

In 2009, Ridgeway was slated to be absorbed into Birkenhead Park School along with Park and Rock Ferry High Schools. Wirral Council eventually scratched Ridgeway off the list of schools to combine after pushback from parents. This decision was stopped by parents.

== Demographics ==
The majority of Ridgeway students are White British; about 58% of pupils are boys and 42% are girls. 46% are eligible for free school meals.

In 2021, with 99 school staff, the teacher to pupil ratio was 1 teacher for every 13 students.

== GCSE ==
In 2016, Ridgeway achieved a 70% A* to C score; 100% scored A* to C in performing arts; and 70% of students achieved at least one GCSE. In 2018, 55% achieved 9-4 grades in maths; 68% in English; 69% achieved 9-4 grades in computer science, 67% in religion, 93% in drama, 62% in English literature.

== Awards and rankings ==
In 2021, the Guardian Schools Guide scored Ridgeway's pupil attendance at a 10 out of 100 points. Poor attendance has been an issue for several years. The two most recent inspections were in 2017 and 2021 and Ofsted rated them as "requires improvement." Their 2007 and 2010 inspections were "Outstanding" but their 2013 inspection dropped to "Good." Pauline Roberts, who was headteacher for four years, resigned in 2013 for "personal reasons." She was lauded by parents as the one responsible for drastically improving Ridgeway and were worried that the school, which achieved "Outstanding" during her time there, would regress.

In 2018, the PE department won the School Communication Award from the ECHO School Awards and in 2021, Ridgeway was shortlisted alongside St. James', Wade Deacon, and Hope Academy in the category "Outstanding commitment to sport & physical activity in secondary schools" for the annual Educate Awards.
