= 3rd World Scout Jamboree =

- Coming of Age jamboree
- Location: Upton, Birkenhead
- Country: United Kingdom
- Date: 1929
- Attendance: 30,000 Scouts
Previous; 2nd World Scout Jamboree	Next; 4th World Scout Jamboree

Cartoon in Punch, published in 1929 for the 3rd World Scout Jamboree

The 3rd World Scout Jamboree was held in 1929 at Arrowe Park in Upton, near Birkenhead, Wirral, United Kingdom. As it was commemorating the 21st birthday of Scouting for Boys and the Scouting movement, it is also known as the Coming of Age Jamboree. With about 30,000 Scouts and over 300,000 visitors attending, this jamboree was the largest jamboree so far.

== Organizational details ==
From 29 July to 12 August 1929, the third World Scout Jamboree was held at Arrowe Park in the village of Upton, approximately 4 miles (6.4 km) from the town of Birkenhead, United Kingdom. This jamboree commemorated the 21st birthday of Scouting, counting from the publication of the book Scouting for Boys by General Baden-Powell. Therefore, this jamboree is also known as the Coming of Age Jamboree.

The Jamboree on a site of 450 acres (1.8 km^{2}) was opened by the Duke of Connaught, the president of the Boy Scout Association, and thirty thousand Scouts and Girl Guides of many countries attended. During the first week, the weather was poor, turning the park grass into ankle deep mud, gaining the jamboree its nickname jamboree of mud.

The camp was organized in eight subcamps, around a specially built town in the middle, called Midway, where Scouts could purchase materials. Each subcamp provided pitches for a contingent of Scouts troops. The organization of daily chores such as cooking, campfire collecting, etc. were done in turn by the groups.

The Girl Guides in Cheshire were asked to run a hospital under canvas. There were 321 cases admitted and 2323 out-patient cases during the Jamboree. Only 52 cases had to be sent to other hospitals. Staff dealt with a range of problems from minor cuts, burns and sprains to fractures and head injuries. Two Guiders ran a dispensary providing both prescription and non-prescription medicines. There was also a dental clinic and an operating theatre. The hospital canteen provided meals for patients and the 50 members of staff, including many special diets, all cooked on open fires. Staff were asked to accommodate lost boys after the Wolf Cub rally. The hospital was also proud to be asked to provide the bedding and equipment for the Prince of Wales' tent. This hospital had the far-reaching effect that many heads of Boy Scout movements from other countries saw the excellent work of the Girl Guides and changed their attitudes towards them.

== Events during the jamboree ==
On Baden-Powell a peerage was to be conferred by King George V, as was announced on 2 August by the Prince of Wales who attended the Jamboree in Scout uniform. The formal title of Baron Baden-Powell, of Gilwell, co. Essex was granted on 17 September 1929, confirming the high notion Baden-Powell had of education and training, after Gilwell Park where the international Scout Leader training in the Wood Badge course took place.

In the morning of Sunday 4 August, an open-air thanksgiving service was held, presided by Cosmo Lang, Archbishop of Canterbury, and by Francis Bourne, Archbishop of Westminster, for Protestant and Catholic Scouts; and later that day a service was also held in Liverpool Cathedral.

On 10 August, the Chief Scout Sir Robert Baden-Powell was given special attention. On behalf of all Scouts worldwide, he was presented with a Rolls-Royce motor car and a caravan trailer. The caravan was nicknamed Eccles and is now on display at Gilwell Park. These gifts were paid for by penny donations of more than 1 million Scouts worldwide. The car, nicknamed Jam Roll, was sold after his death by Olave Baden-Powell in 1945. Jam Roll and Eccles were reunited at Gilwell for the 21st World Scout Jamboree in 2007. Recently it has been purchased on behalf of Scouting and is owned by a charity, B–P Jam Roll Ltd. Funds are being raised to repay the loan that was used to purchase the car. Also he was given an oil painted portrait by David Jagger, which since has been used as a publicity picture by many Scout organizations. It is on display in the Baden-Powell House. Lastly, Baden-Powell was given a cheque for £2,750 and an illuminated address.

== Closing ceremony and Golden Arrow ==
The farewell ceremony on the last day, 12 August, consisted of a march with flags and banners past the royal box with the Chief Scout and other officers, ending in a Wheel of Friendship formed by the Scouts, with 21 spokes symbolic for the 21 years of Scouting. While burying a hatchet in a cask of gilded wooden arrows, Baden-Powell addressed the gathered Scouts.

Here is the hatchet of war, of enmity, of bad feeling, which I now bury in Arrowe. From all corners of the world you came to the call of brotherhood and to Arrowe. Now I send you forth to your homelands bearing the sign of peace, good-will and fellowship to all your fellow men. From now on in Scouting the symbol of peace and goodwill is a golden arrow. Carry that arrow on and on, so that all may know of the brotherhood of men.

Then he sent the golden arrows as peace symbols to the North, South, West, and East, through the spokes of the Wheel of Friendship.

I want you all to go back from here to your countries in different parts of the world with a new idea in your minds of having brothers in every country... Go forth from here as ambassadors of goodwill and friendship. Every one of you Scouts, no matter how young or small, can spread a good word about this country and those whom you have met here. Try to make yourselves better Scouts than ever; try to help other boys, especially the poorer boys, to be happy, healthy, and helpful citizens like yourselves. And now, farewell, goodbye, God Bless you all.

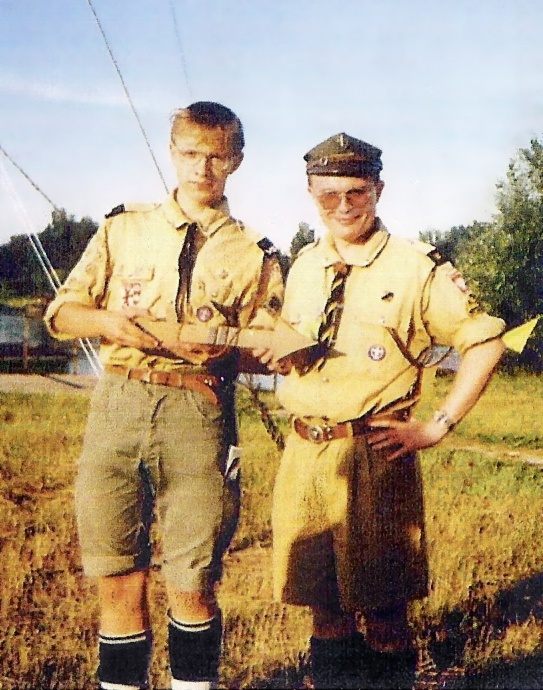
Polish Scouts with Golden Arrow.

The Golden Arrows are wooden gilded, about 40 centimeter-long. It is not certain how many arrows there were. Three of the Golden Arrows are placed in England. One in the Museum at the Youlbury Scout Activity Centre, near Oxford. The other, given to the Polish contingent in 1929, was last seen in 2000 in Warsaw, Poland.

"In the early part of the Second World War a Polish soldier was taken prisoner in his own country and managed to escape. He was a Scout, and had been the one to receive the Golden Arrow from the hands of the Chief at the Jamboree at Arrowe Park on the coming-of-age of Scouting in 1929. He had lost everything – home, family, and all that he held most dear – except one precious possession – the Golden Arrow, in rough wood, which he was determined to take away with him. After passing through many adventures he reached Great Britain. Nothing arrived except one brave worn-out Polish soldier and his Golden Arrow. He sought out a Scout whom he knew, and by whom he had been taught his Scouting in the old days at Gilwell Park. To him he gave the Arrow, saying that for the present it was no longer of any use to him. He had brought it to the only haven he knew. It was afterwards given into the safe keeping of small, country troop, who looked upon it with great pride. The Chief never knew this story, but would have loved it if he had, and might truly have said:

I shot an arrow into the air, It fell to earth I know not where...

Some day, when war is over and peace has come, the Arrow will go back to Poland. That is what the brotherhood of Scouts does for people. That is the spirit of Scouting. And badly will that spirit of comradeship be needed for the reconstruction of the world that lies ahead."

In 1996, during the camp celebrating the re-admittance to World Scouting of the Polish Scouting and Guiding Association, the Golden Arrow was given to Polish International Commissioner.

== Memorabilia ==
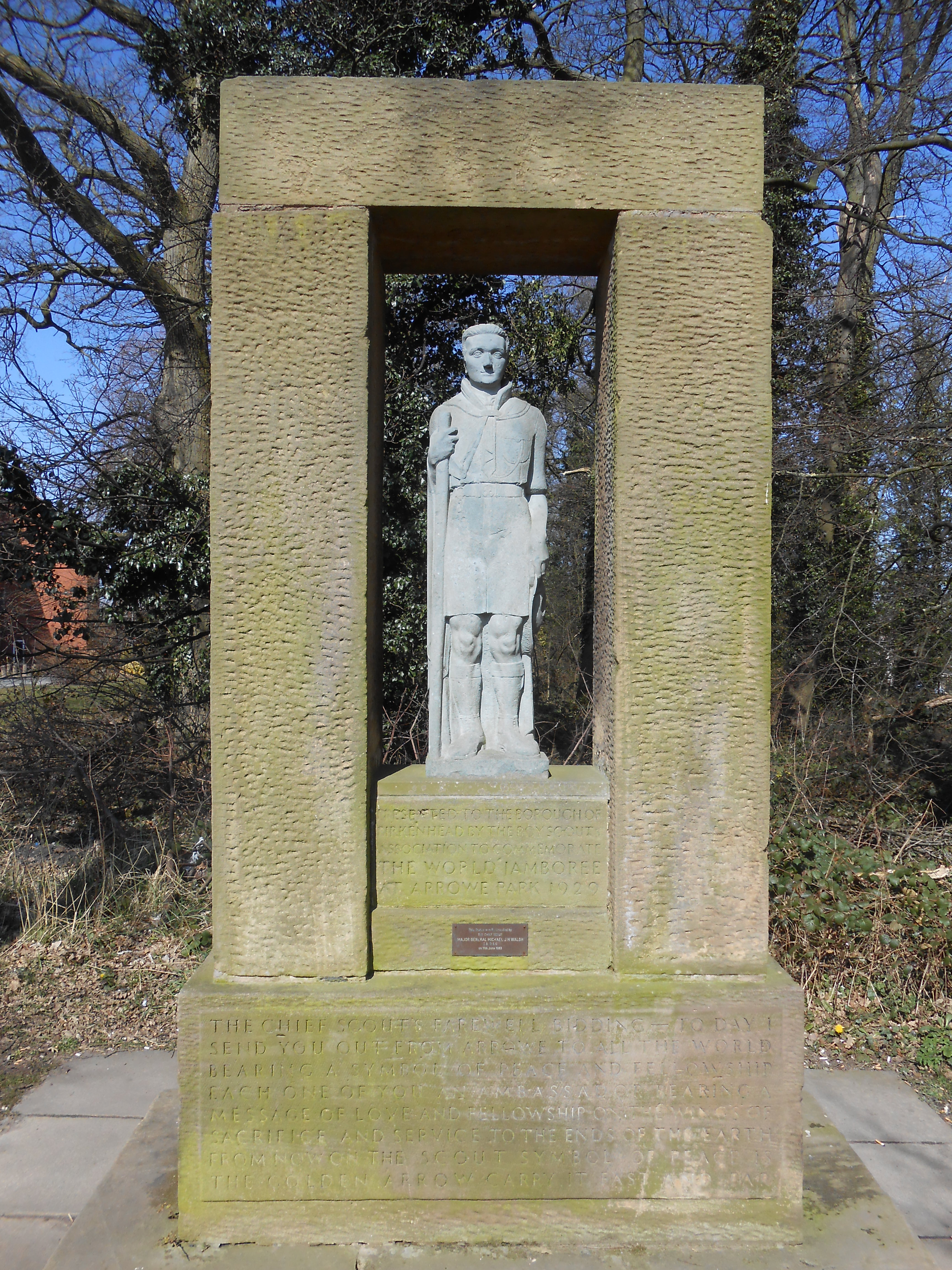
1931 memorial sculpture for the 3rd World Scout Jamboree at Arrowe Park

For the event, a memorial sculpture by sculptor Edward Carter Preston was erected in 1931 at an entrance to the park, now within the grounds of Arrowe Park Hospital. It was commissioned by the Boy Scout Movement and unveiled by Lord Hampton, the Headquarter's Commissioner. After restoration in the early 1980s, it was re-unveiled in 1983 by the then Chief Scout Major-General Michael Walsh.

== Related reading ==
- Fisher, Claude (1929). The World Jamboree, 1929: the quest for the Golden Arrow. The Boy Scouts Association. p. 151 pages. ASIN B0008D276Y.
