= Pensby High School =

Co-educational secondary school in Pensby, Wirral, England

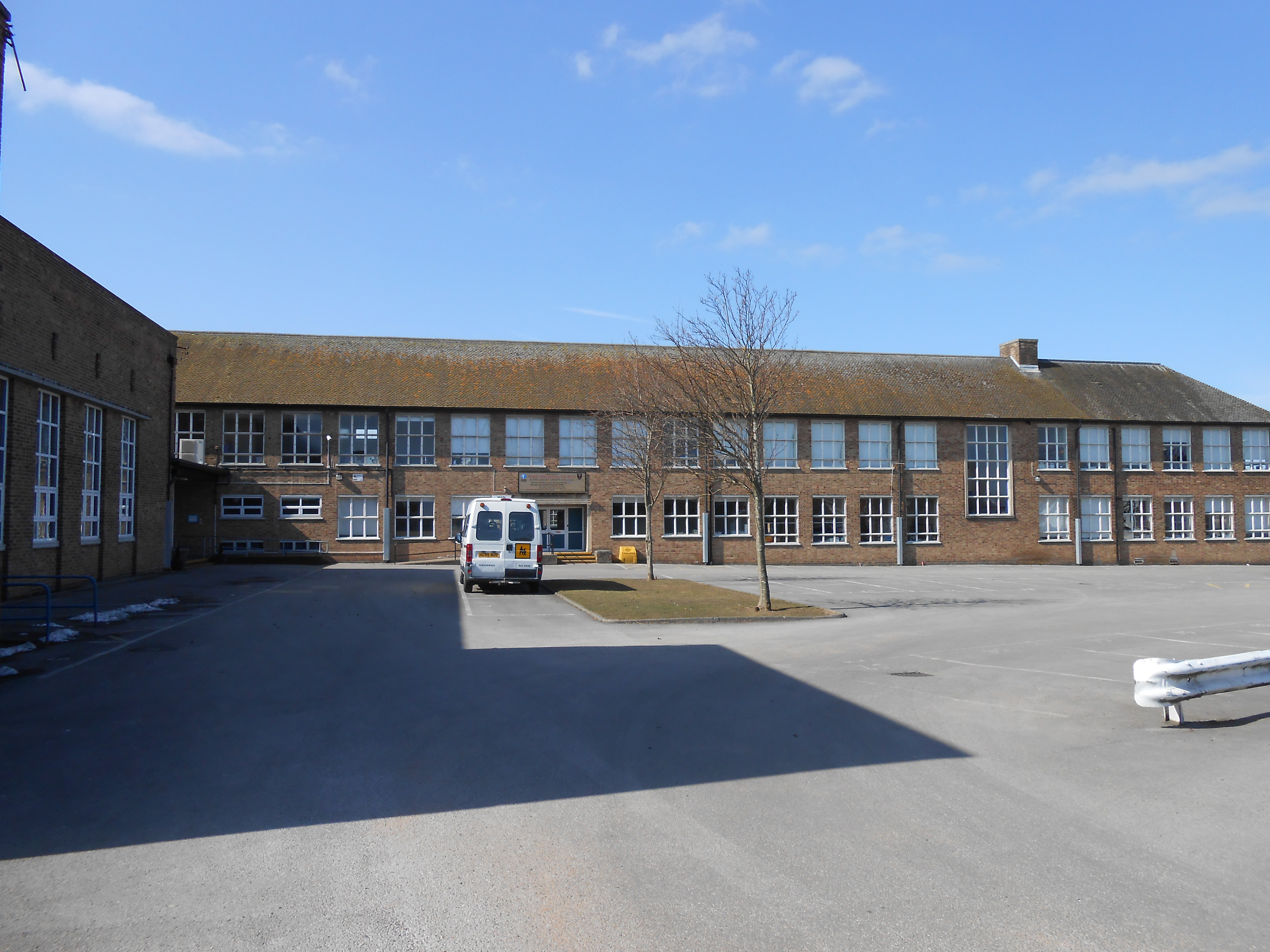

Location
- Irby Road; Pensby, Merseyside, CH61 6XN; England; 53.3433°N 3.1124°W

Information
- Type: Community school
- Motto: Care Respect Inspire
- Established: 1950; 76 years ago
- Local authority: Wirral Borough Council
- Department for Education URN: 105101 Tables
- Ofsted: Reports
- Headteacher: Kevin Flanagan
- Gender: Mixed
- Age: 11 to 16
- Enrolment: 688 (January 2018)
- Capacity: 890 (January 2018)
- Website: http://www.pensbyhighschool.org/

Pensby High School is a co-educational secondary school in Pensby, on the Wirral Peninsula, Merseyside, England.

The school site was originally split between a boys' school and girls' school which was federated, allowing joint staffing/teaching across the two schools whilst the pupils of each school (in years 7 to 11) remained separate. The two schools merged to form one mixed school beginning from the start of the September 2015 term and removed the sixth form later on.

In July 2024, Pensby High School head teacher Kevin Flanagan sued two parents of children at the school for harassment, as well as reporting them to the police, due to posts they made about him on social media. The lawsuit was eventually settled, while Merseyside Police found "no evidence of any course of conduct taking place which would amount to a criminal offence". In June 2025 a judge ordered the school to reveal how much it had spent towards the £210,576 legal costs of bringing the lawsuit, with the judge highlighting the need for financial transparency given that the school had issued a letter to parents warning it was struggling to pay rising gas and electricity bills and would have to limit the amount of heating it provided.

== Notable former pupils ==
- Phillip Blond, political philosopher, theologian and director of the ResPublica think tank
- Graham Branch, a professional footballer with Tranmere Rovers 1991–1998, Burnley 1999–2007
- Steve Cummings, racing cyclist who took silver with GB team in 2004 Athens Olympics
- Jonathan Mellor, long-distance runner 2:09:06 marathon and sixth place in the 2022 Commonwealth Games
- Mike Dean, FA premier league referee
- Ian Woan, a professional footballer with Nottingham Forest 1990–2000
