= Arrowe Country Park =

Country park in Wirral, England

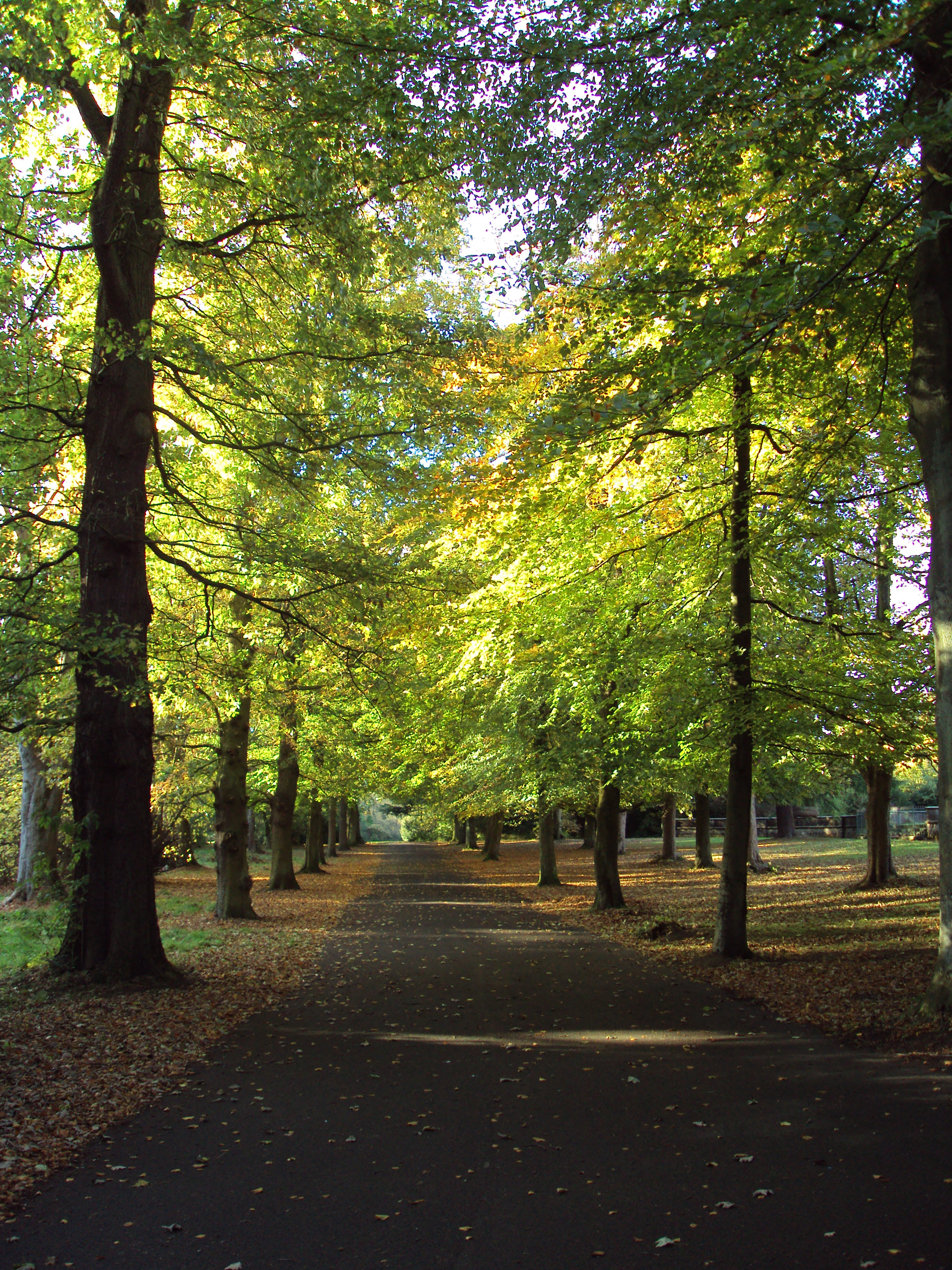
- Arrowe Country Park
- Interactive map of Arrowe Country Park
- Type: Country park
- Location: Arrowe Park
- Coordinates: 53.3674°N 3.1009°W
- Area: 250 acres (1.0 km^{2})
- Created: 1926
- Operator: Metropolitan Borough of Wirral
- Open: All year

Arrowe Country Park is a country park in Arrowe Park, Wirral, England, adjacent to the Woodchurch housing estate. The estate upon which the park lies was founded and shaped by John Shaw, a former Mayor of Liverpool who made his wealth from the slave trade. When he died the estate passed to his great nephew John "Ralph" Shaw, who built Arrowe Hall, an Elizabethan-style mansion, and laid out the grounds and gardens. Ralph Shaw was a magistrate who dissuaded people from trespassing on his land with traps including spring-loaded shotguns.

In 1926 the estate was bought by the Birkenhead Corporation who turned it over to public recreation. The park's facilities include nature walks, meadows, a lake, an eighteen hole golf course and it is a Site of Biological Interest.

== History ==
The estate upon which the country park now sits was founded by John Shaw, a merchant shipping owner, who made much of his wealth from the shipping of slaves between Africa and Jamaica. He was also the Mayor of Liverpool from 1794–95 and 1800–01, being noted for his charity to the poor and needy. John Shaw retired to the Wirral and purchased Arrowe House Farm, a now-demolished mansion, and continued to buy land in the Arrowe area. In 1829 he died, leaving the estate to this great nephew John "Ralph" Shaw. In 1840 John Wright purchased land owned by Warrington grammar school and sold it on to Ralph Shaw, who now owned 748 out of 752 acres of Arrowe township.

The mansion house upon the estate, Arrowe Hall, was built in 1835 by Ralph Shaw. During this time he landscaped the park; he also changed the course of Arrowe Brook and dammed it to create Arrowe Lake and a waterfall. Ralph Shaw, a magistrate, was very tough on trespassers and poachers in court. On his estate he installed mantraps and spring-loaded shotguns to dissuade poachers and trespassers from straying onto his land.

In the early 1900s Arrowe Estate was bought by Major McCalmont, but as he was in the army he rented it to John Williamson, the shipping magnate who created the Williamson Art Gallery and Museum. In 1917 the estate was sold to Lord Leverhulme. It was sold again in 1926, to the Birkenhead Corporation who converted it to public recreation. Between 29 July and 12 August 1929, the 3rd World Scout Jamboree was held at Arrowe Park. In the 1930s the golf course, tennis courts and bowling greens were built, brass bands played on the hall lawn and some of the hall was used as a cafe. At the beginning of World War II the Hall was an army headquarters. After returning from Dunkirk many French soldiers were stationed in huts on the park; the park was also used for tank training.

== Arrowe Hall ==
Arrowe Hall was built by John Ralph Shaw between 1835 and 1844 in an Elizabethan style, the hall was extended between 1864 and 1876 with a billiards room and a conservatory being built. The hall had servants quarters, a study, library, dining room, withdrawing room, kitchen, washhouse, laundry area, cellar, a school room and nurseries. The grounds had well-maintained lawns with shrubs, an orchard, a stable and a coach house for guests. Arrowe Hall was grade II listed with Historic England in 1974. The hall has passed through a number of owners and has been converted into a care home for adults with disabilities.

== Facilities ==
There is an 18-hole municipal golf course, a 9 hole pitch and putt golf course, footgolf, a children's play area, an outdoor gym, tennis courts, open parkland, ponds, deciduous forest, a crown green bowling area, a fishing lake, orienteering, woodland walks, dog walking, cycling, a cafe, toilets and picnic areas. Arrowe Brook flows along the western edge of the park, from south to north, alongside a path. The brook also incorporates Arrowe Park Lake. The park has an area of 250 acres (1.0 km^{2}) and is open all year.

== Nature ==
Arrowe Country Park contains a Site of Biological Importance which covers Nicholson’s Plantation, Gorse Covert, the golf course, the hay meadow, Arrowe Brook, Arrowe lake and the trees near Arrowe Hall which are bat roosts. A variety of bird life can be found which include nuthatches, treecreepers and woodpeckers. The wildflower meadows attract butterflies such as small heath, skipper and the speckled wood. The ponds in the park are habitats for frogs, damsel flies and dragonflies.
