= Wirral Rural District =

Former local government area in the UK

Coordinates: 53.335°N 3.043°W

Wirral
- History
  - Created: 1894
  - Abolished: 1933
  - Succeeded by: Wirral Urban District
- Status: rural district

Wirral Rural District was a rural district on the Wirral Peninsula in Cheshire, England from 1894 to 1933. It was created under the Local Government Act 1894 from the Wirral Rural Sanitary District.

From the beginning of the twentieth century, some civil parishes were transferred to the control of neighbouring local authorities. Netherpool, Whitby and Overpool had become part of Ellesmere Port Urban District by 1911. Landican, Prenton and Thingwall were absorbed into Birkenhead County Borough in 1928.

Wirral Rural District was abolished on 1 April 1933 under a County Review Order, with the remaining civil parishes being split between Bebington Urban District, Birkenhead County Borough, Ellesmere Port Urban District, Hoylake Urban District, Neston Urban District, Wallasey County Borough and the new Wirral Urban District.

As of 2025 the area of the former rural district is divided between the Metropolitan Borough of Wirral in Merseyside and the unitary authority of Cheshire West and Chester in Cheshire.
