= Dawpool =

Village in United Kingdom

Coordinates: 53.3471°N 3.1581°W

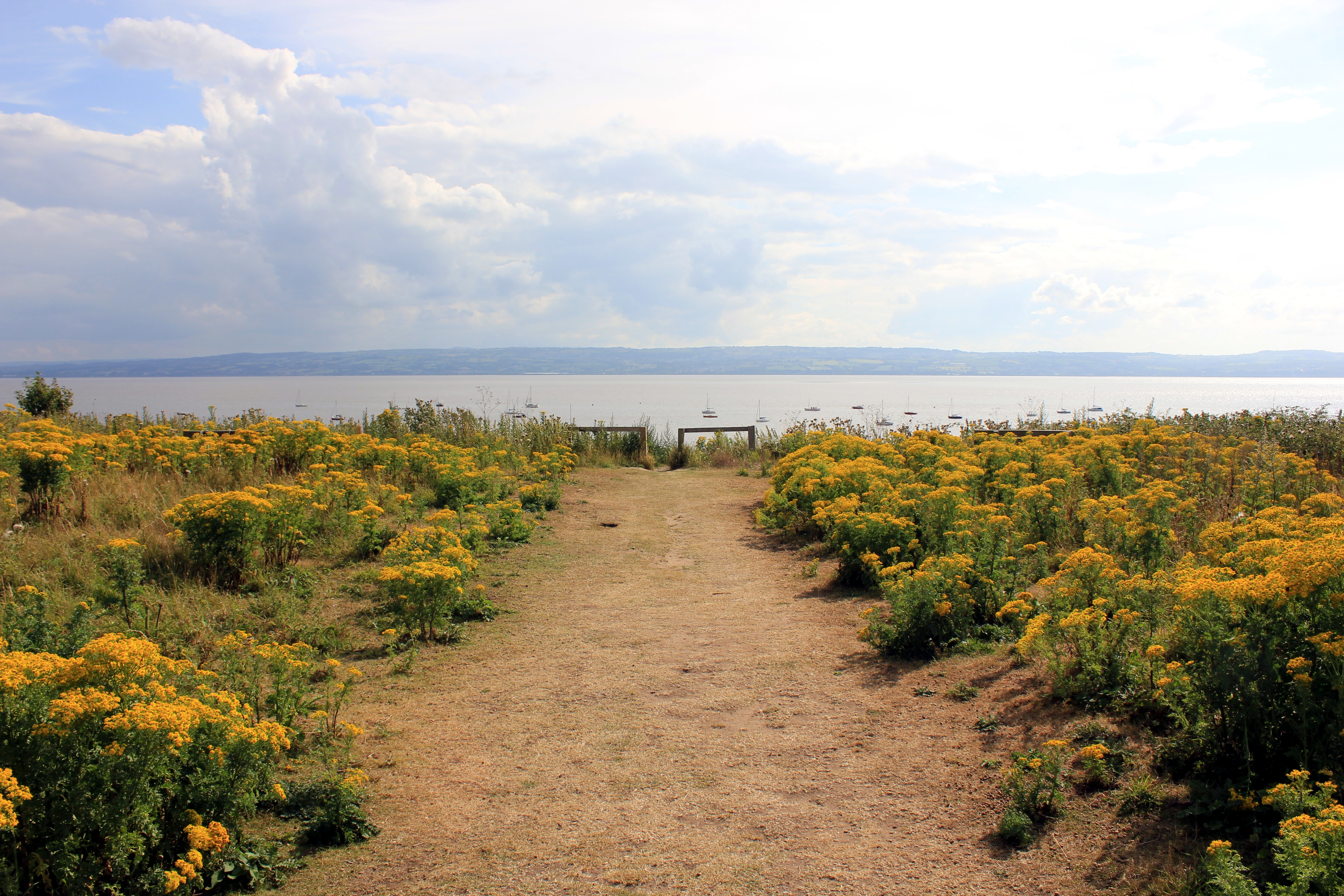
Dawpool Nature Reserve

Dawpool was a village and port on the Dee Estuary in Cheshire, England. The village was between Thurstaston and Caldy on the Wirral Peninsula, and the site is now within the Metropolitan Borough of Wirral. The harbour at Dawpool was once a stopping-off point for packet ships between Parkgate and Dublin.

Dawpool House, the former residence of the White Star Line owner Thomas Henry Ismay, was demolished in 1927. A nature reserve on the site of a former landfill site retains the name.
