= Harold Sanderson =

British businessman (1859–1932)

- Born: 20 October 1859; Bebington, Cheshire, England
- Died: 26 February 1932 (aged 72); Rapallo, Liguria, Italy
- Occupations: Shipowner; Businessman
- Title: President of the International Mercantile Marine Company (1913–1915); Chairman of the White Star Line (1913–1928)
- Spouse: Maud Blood (m. 1885; died 1927)
- Children: 5, including Basil
- Relatives: J. Bruce Ismay (brother-in-law)

Harold Arthur Sanderson (20 October 1859 – 26 February 1932) was a British shipowner and businessman who served as President of the International Mercantile Marine Company (IMM) and as chairman of the White Star Line.

== Early life ==
He was born in Bebington, Cheshire, to Richard Sanderson (1831–1921) and Eliza Palmer Zara Hicks (1831–1889). His father moved the family to New York City, where, in 1878, he founded the firm of Sanderson & Son. Harold took over the management of the firm in the 1880s.

== Shipping career ==
Sanderson returned to England around 1893 to take on the management of Wilson & Sons in Hull. In 1895, he was appointed general manager of the White Star Line.

In 1899, Sanderson became a partner in Ismay, Imrie & Co., the parent company of the White Star Line. In 1902, the White Star Line was subsumed into the International Mercantile Marine Company (IMM), which was founded by J. P. Morgan and J. Bruce Ismay. Sanderson was made vice president of the trust. His position as vice president placed him on the board of several other associated companies, such as those of Shaw, Savill & Albion Line and the Leyland Line.

Sanderson was on board the RMS Titanic during her sea trials and on her delivery trip. He disembarked in Southampton. After the ship sank on her maiden voyage, Sanderson was called as a witness at the British inquiry into the sinking.

After Ismay resigned as both President of the IMM and chair of the White Star Line, Sanderson took over both positions. However, after financial difficulties, Sanderson resigned as president in 1915; he was eventually succeeded as President of IMM by Phillip Franklin in 1916. He stayed on as chair of White Star till retiring in 1928.

== Personal life ==
Sanderson married Maud Blood, a native of New York City, in 1885. They had five children: Lee, Olga, Harold, Basil, and David. They lived in Bentley, Hampshire. Sanderson was widowed in 1927.

Sanderson died in Rapallo, Italy, on 26 February 1932. He had been there to visit his daughter and for his health, but fell ill and died before he got to his destination. After the news of his death, the RMS Baltic lowered her flag to half-mast in his honour.
