= Richard Thomas Fry =

Valet of J. Bruce Ismay (1872–1912)

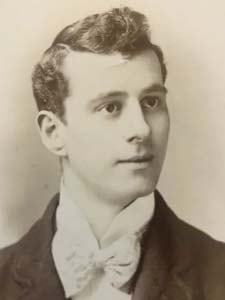
- Born: John Richard Fry; 23 November 1872; London, England
- Died: 15 April 1912 (aged 39); Atlantic Ocean
- Occupation: valet
- Years active: 1904–1912
- Employer: J. Bruce Ismay

Richard Thomas Fry (23 November 1872 – 15 April 1912) was the valet for J. Bruce Ismay, chairman and managing director of the White Star Line; Richard perished during the sinking of the RMS Titanic while Ismay survived.

== Life ==
Richard was born in London, England to photographer and artist George Fry (b. 1849) and Eliza Emma, née Willshire (b. 1850); in 1880 the family moved north to Coatham and moved once again around 1891 to Sheffield. Richard found employment as a footman for a wealthy manufacturing family in Meltham and his mother died shortly after he was hired. In 1901 he left Meltham to work as a butler for the wealthy Pilkington family of Rainford. On 24 August 1904, he married Mary Ann Burton (b. 1875) in Liverpool and also took a position as Joseph Bruce Ismay's valet.

== RMS Titanic ==
Richard, Joseph and Joseph's secretary William Henry Harrison boarded the Titanic on 10 April 1912, and Richard occupied cabin B-102. Richard was killed during the sinking and his body was never identified; after his death Joseph took Mary Curtis and his children into his household presumably out of gratitude for the role Fry played in helping him to safety and for his length of service.
