= Thurstaston Hall =

Country house in Wirral, Merseyside, England

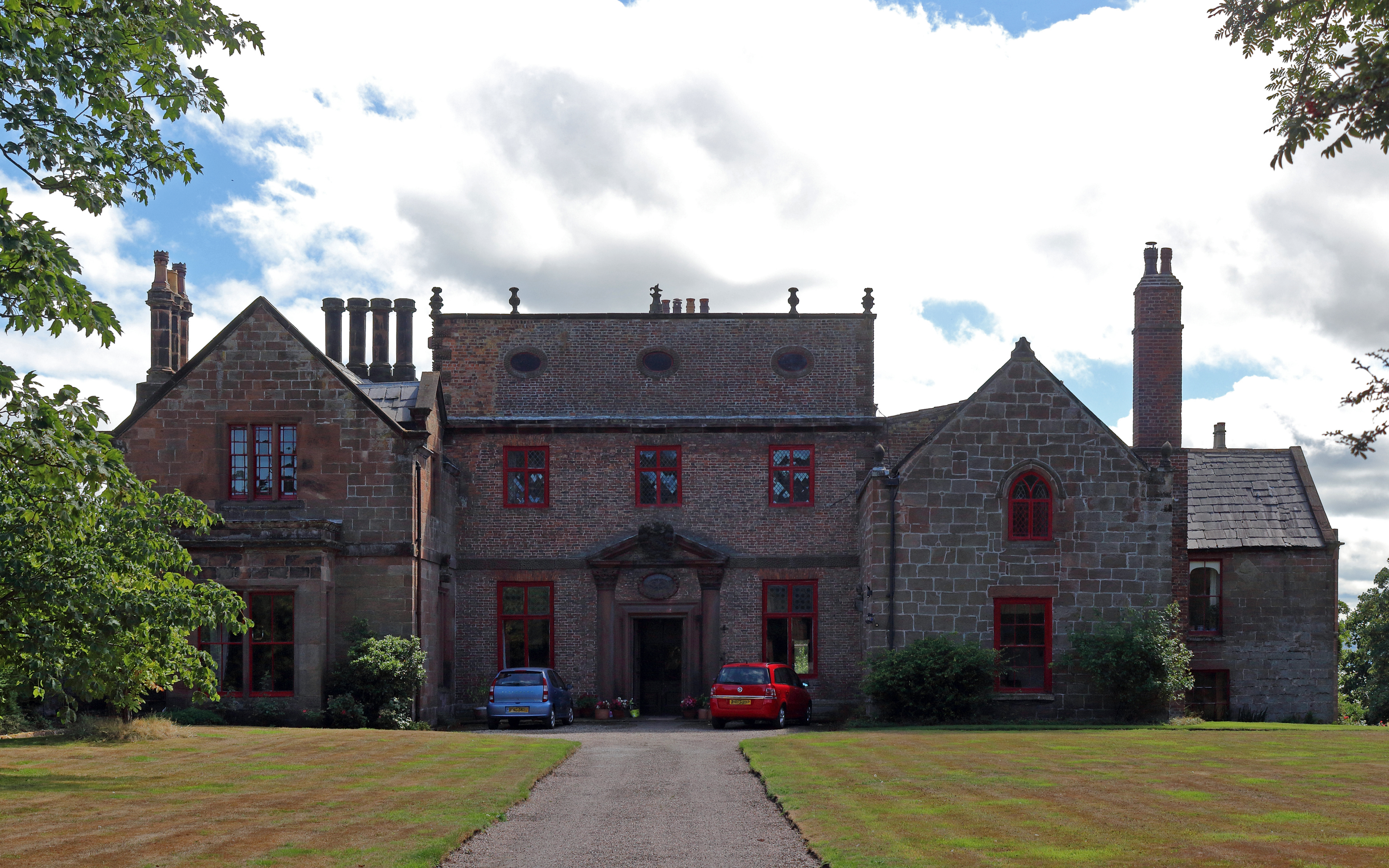
- The hall in 2018

- Location in Merseyside

General information
- Type: Country house
- Location: Thurstaston, Wirral, Merseyside, England
- Coordinates: 53.3483°N 3.1327°W
- Years built: 14th century (west wing); 1680 (central block); 1836 (east wing)

Design and construction
- Designations

Listed Building – Grade II*
- Official name: Thurstaston Hall
- Designated: 15 November 1962
- Reference no.: 1075371

Thurstaston Hall is a country house in the village of Thurstaston, Wirral, Merseyside, England. The house is built in stone and brick, it is in two storeys, and it has a U-shaped plan. The oldest part, the west wing, was built in the 14th century, the central block dates from 1680, and the east wing was added in 1836. The hall is recorded in the National Heritage List for England as a designated Grade II* listed building, and the gate piers in the drive leading to the hall are designated Grade II.

== History ==
The manor of Thurstaston was given to Robert de Rodelent by Hugh Lupus, Earl of Chester, in 1070. The original manor house was built on a moated site, and the manor passed during the following centuries to the Whitmore and Glegg families. The oldest part of the present hall is the west wing, which dates from the 14th century, and was probably the cross wing of a great hall that formed the central part of the house at that time. The central block was built in 1680, and the east wing was added in 1836.

== Architecture ==
=== Exterior ===
Thurstaston Hall has a U-shaped plan with a central block and two wings, and is in two storeys. The 14th-century west wing is in stone. On its east face are two blocked doorways with pointed arches, and on the gable end is a pointed window in the first floor with a hood mould and with stops carved with heads. The west face has a chimney breast and a projection further to the west containing a datestone inscribed with the date 1680. The central block is in brick with stone dressings, and has a symmetrical three-bay front. In the centre is a bolection-moulded doorcase surrounded by unfluted Corinthian half-columns, and a broken pediment containing an armorial shield. Above the doorway is an oval window, and the other windows on the front are mullioned and transomed. At the top of the front is a cornice with blind oval windows and finials. The east wing is in Elizabethan style. It contains mullioned windows and gabled half-dormers. On the gable end is a bay window containing sashes. At the rear of the hall are service rooms, closets, steps and passageways.

=== Interior ===
The entrance hall contains a fireplace with bolection moulding. Above this is a re-used 16th-century overmantel in Jacobean style with pilasters and arched panels. The main staircase is in the west wing, and has twisted balusters and flat-topped newels. Two of the smaller rooms contain panelling with bolection moulding. In the principal room of the east wing is a fireplace with Renaissance and Gothic features.

== Associated structures ==
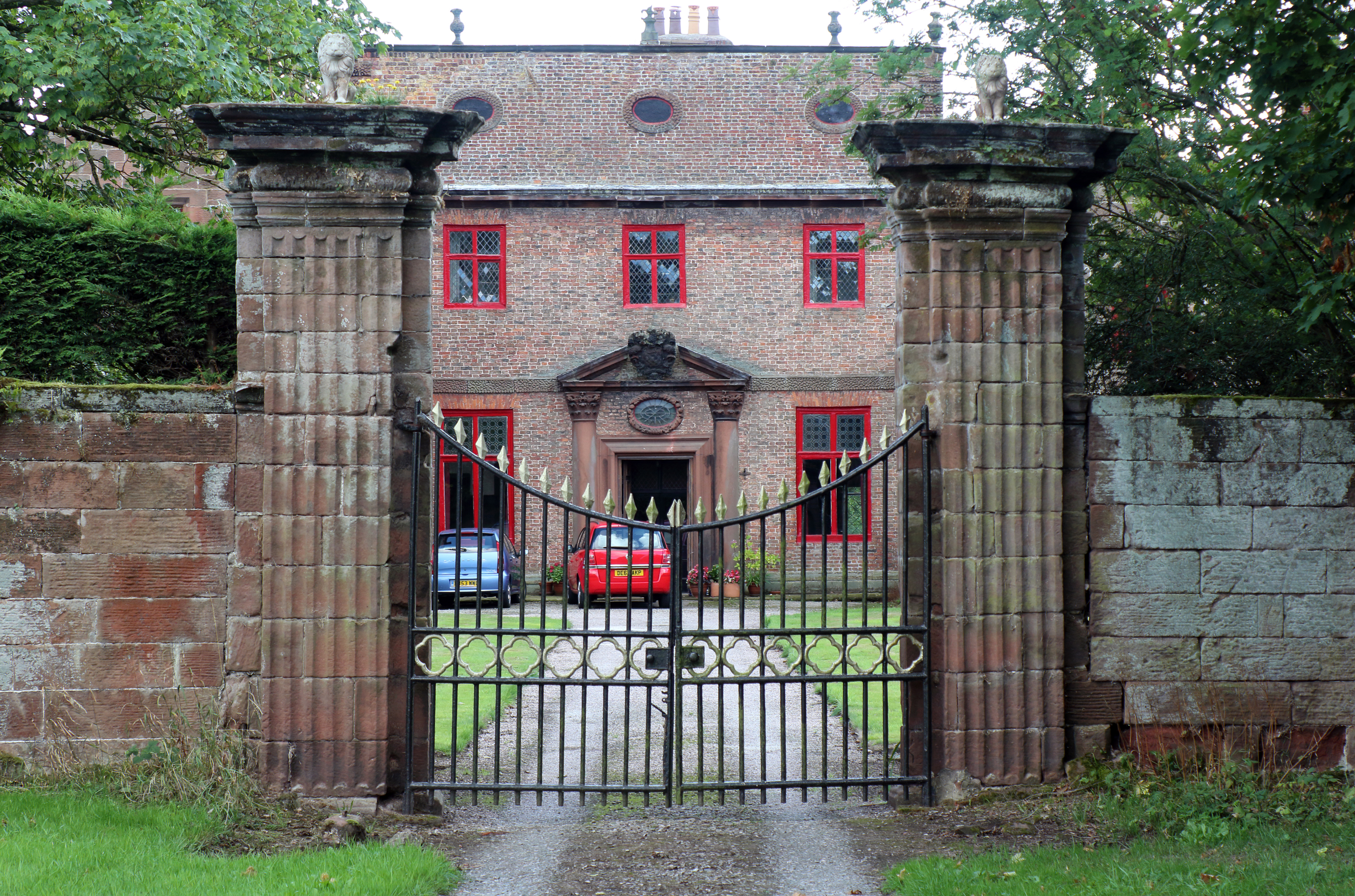
The Grade II listed gates

On the driveway to the north of the hall is a pair of stone gate piers dated 1733. They have a cruciform plan, on each face are fluted pilasters, and on the south faces are niches and date panels. At the tops of the piers are entablatures with pulvinated friezes that are surmounted by finials in the form of lions' heads (the Whitmore crest).

== Appraisal ==
Thurstaston Hall was designated a Grade II* listed building on 15 November 1962, and on the same date the gate piers were designated Grade II. Grade II* is the middle of the three grades of listing and is applied to "particularly important buildings of more than special interest". Grade II, the lowest grade, applies to buildings that are "nationally important and of special interest". Hartwell et al in the Buildings of England series describe the hall as being "of charming appearance, tranquil and mellow".

== See also ==
- Grade II* listed buildings in Merseyside
- Listed buildings in Thurstaston
