= Philip Albright Small Franklin =

American shipping executive

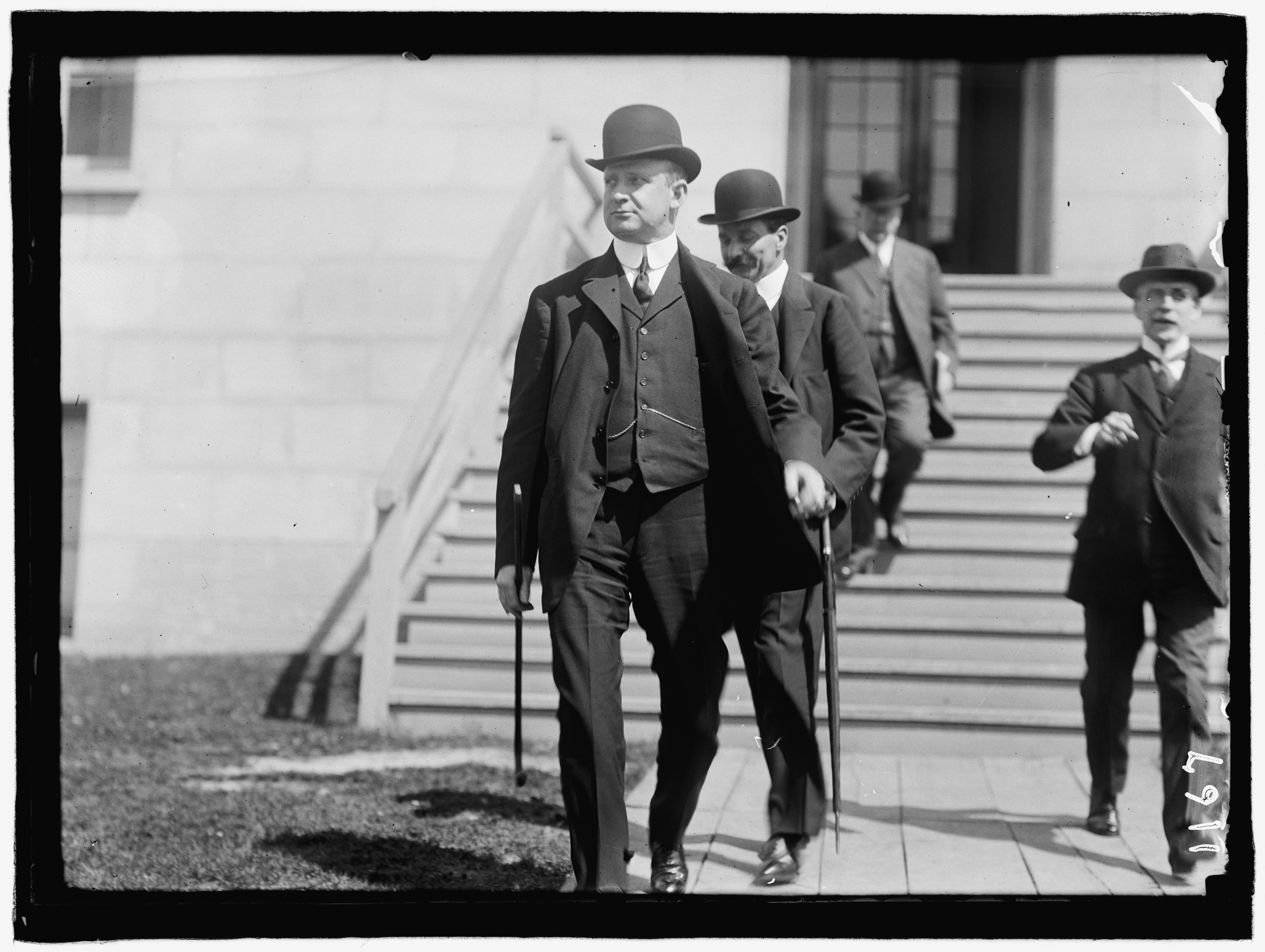
- Born: February 1, 1871
- Died: August 14, 1939 (aged 68)
- Resting place: Locust Valley Cemetery, Locust Valley, New York, U.S.
- Other name: Philip A. S. Franklin
- Occupation: Shipping executive

Philip Albright Small Franklin (1 February 1871 – 14 August 1939) was president and chairman of International Mercantile Marine Company (IMM) from 1916 to 1936. At the time of the Titanic disaster on April 15, 1912, Franklin was in charge of the White Star Line office and terminus affairs at IMM headquarters in New York City.

== Titanic disaster ==
At the time of the Titanic disaster on April 15, 1912, Franklin was in charge of the White Star Line office and terminus affairs at IMM headquarters in New York City. Upon hearing about the ship's sinking via Wireless messages, he did not at first assume the worst, saying in a statement to worried relatives and friends of the ship's ill-fated passengers and press reporters crowding outside the White Star Line offices at around 10:30 PM that night, "There is no danger that Titanic will sink. The boat is unsinkable, and nothing but inconvenience will be suffered by the passengers." Later, at about 11:30, he insisted, "We hope that reports from the Virginian and the Parisian will prove to be true, and that they will turn up with some of the passengers..." (Other than those already aboard the Cunard liner Carpathia) But, by midnight, Franklin admitted the seriousness of the situation, saying in a statement, "I thought her unsinkable, and I based my opinion on the best expert advice. I do not understand it." Nevertheless, his competent handling of the public relations crisis in New York at the time earned him praise from the directors of IMM, and Franklin was later promoted in due course as J. Bruce Ismay had fallen out of favor due to the latter's controversial association with the lost ship. Ismay had, at one point, been considered for the presidency of IMM before the Titanic disaster.

== Later years ==
For a time during the First World War, Franklin directed the movements of all U.S. flagged merchant ships. Franklin was depicted on the cover of the May 17, 1926, issue of Time. In the years after IMM had disposed of its stake in White Star, when Cunard White Star was rumoured to be considering the imminent scrapping of RMS Olympic, sister ship to Titanic, Franklin commented "I would hate to hear that such a terrible thing was even being considered. She has a number of cabins that are unsurpassed. I cannot believe the report from Southampton is true". The comments were widely reported in the press with Cunard-White Star Line responding that they "were rather interested in the remark attributed to Franklin that the ship is in his opinion the finest afloat" and "might not be averse to disposing of her to Mr Franklin and obtaining from him the very high price he would no doubt be desirous of paying" But such a deal did not come to pass.

== Portrayals ==
- David Ogrodowski (2024) - Unsinkable (named "P.S. Franklin", film)
