= Basil Sanderson, 1st Baron Sanderson of Ayot =

British businessman

The Right Honourable The Lord Sanderson of Ayot MC
- Born: 19 June 1894
- Died: 15 August 1971 (aged 77)
- Education: Rugby School
- Alma mater: Trinity College, Oxford
- Occupation: Businessman
- Spouse: Evelyn Constance Ismay
- Children: 2
- Parents: Harold Sanderson (father); Maud Blood (mother)
- Relatives: J. Bruce Ismay (father-in-law)

Basil Sanderson, 1st Baron Sanderson of Ayot MC (19 June 1894 – 15 August 1971), was a British businessman and public servant.

== Early life ==
Basil Sanderson was born on 19 June 1894. His father, Harold Sanderson, was the general manager of the White Star Line. His mother was Maud Blood of New York City.

Sanderson was educated at the Rugby School and at Trinity College, Oxford. He was commissioned in the Duke of Lancaster's Own Yeomanry in the First World War, in September 1914, and was awarded the Military Cross.

The citation for his MC reads as follows:

For conspicuous gallantry and devotion to duty. During a heavy engagement this officer went forward with complete disregard for his own safety under heavy shell fire to clear up the situation, which at the time was obscure. He returned with very valuable information. He performed his staff duties under most trying circumstances cheerfully and with cool and skilful precision on all occasions.

== Career ==
Like his father he became involved in business, especially the shipping trade, and held directorships with numerous companies.

During the Second World War he served as Director of Shipping in Port at the Ministry of Shipping from 1939 to 1941 and as Head of Port Transit Control at the Ministry of War Transport from 1941 to 1945. After the war Sanderson was managing director of the Shaw Savill shipping line from 1945 to 1959 and the firm's chairman from 1947 to 1963. He was Sheriff of the County of London in 1948.

On 4 July 1960, he was raised to the peerage as Baron Sanderson of Ayot, of Welwyn in the County of Hertford.

== Personal life ==
In 1927 Sanderson married Evelyn Constance Ismay (1897–1940), daughter of businessman J. Bruce Ismay who was the managing director of the White Star Line.

Transcripts of Sanderson's diaries and First World War memoirs are held at Churchill Archives Centre, Cambridge.

== Death and legacy ==
Sanderson died on 15 August 1971, aged 77. He was succeeded in the barony by his eldest twin son Alan, who disclaimed the peerage for life the same year.

Coat of arms of Basil Sanderson, 1st Baron Sanderson of Ayot
Crest A talbot passant Argent pied and eared Sable resting the dexter forepaw on an annulet Or. Escutcheon Paly of six Argent and Azure on a bend Sable a mullet Argent between two annulets Or. Supporters On either side a talbot sejant. Motto Semper Fidelis (Always Faithful)

Peerage of the United Kingdom
New creation	Baron Sanderson of Ayot; 1960–1971	Succeeded by Alan Lindsay Sanderson
