= Baron Sanderson of Ayot =

Barony in the Peerage of the United Kingdom

Baron Sanderson of Ayot, of Welwyn in the County of Hertford, is a title in the Peerage of the United Kingdom. It was created in 1960 for the businessman and public servant, Basil Sanderson (1894–1971). He was the son of the shipping magnate Harold Arthur Sanderson, general manager of the White Star Line, and himself was chairman and president of the Shipping Federation. On Lord Sanderson of Ayot's death in 1971, he was succeeded by his elder twin son, Alan Lindsay Sanderson (1931–2022), a psychiatrist (M.R.C.Psych.), who disclaimed the peerage for life the same year. As of 2022, the title is held by the 2nd Baron's eldest son, Michael Sanderson, 3rd Baron Sanderson of Ayot.

== Barons Sanderson of Ayot (1960) ==
- Basil Sanderson, 1st Baron Sanderson of Ayot (1894–1971)
- Alan Lindsay Sanderson, 2nd Baron Sanderson of Ayot (1931–2022) (disclaimed 1971)
- Michael Sanderson, 3rd Baron Sanderson of Ayot (born 1959)

The heir presumptive is the present holder's first cousin, Basil Sanderson (b. 1974), who is the son of the Hon. Murray Lee Sanderson (1931–2017), second son of the 1st Baron.

== Line of succession ==
- Basil Sanderson, 1st Baron Sanderson of Ayot (1894–1971)
  - Alan Lindsay Sanderson, 2nd Baron Sanderson of Ayot (1931–2022) (title disclaimed 1971)
    - Michael Sanderson, 3rd Baron Sanderson of Ayot (b. 1959)
  - Hon. Murray Lee Sanderson (1931–2017)
    - (1) Basil Sanderson (b. 1974)

Coat of arms of Baron Sanderson of Ayot
Crest A talbot passant Argent pied and eared Sable resting the dexter forepaw on an annulet Or. Escutcheon Paly of six Argent and Azure on a bend Sable a mullet Argent between two annulets Or. Supporters On either side a talbot sejant. Motto Semper Fidelis (Always Faithful)
