= Listed buildings in Thurstaston =

Thurstaston is a village in Wirral, Merseyside, England. It contains twelve buildings on the National Heritage List for England, designated as listed buildings. Of these, two are Grade II*, the middle of the three grades, and the others are Grade II, the lowest grade. The buildings include a country house and a church, both with associated structures; farm buildings; a lodge; a war memorial; and a former school.

== Key ==
| Grade | Criteria |
|---|---|
| II* | Particularly important buildings of more than special interest |
| II | Buildings of national importance and special interest |

== Buildings ==
| Name and location | Photograph | Date | Notes | Grade |
|---|---|---|---|---|
| Thurstaston Hall; 53.34828°N 3.13270°W | | 14th century | A country house with a U-shaped plan and two storeys, the oldest part is the west wing, which is in stone. The central block dates from the late 17th century, is in brick with stone dressings, and has a symmetrical three-bay front with a central Neoclassical doorcase. The east wing was added in 1836, and is in Elizabethan style. | II* |
| Gate piers, Thurstaston Hall; 53.34872°N 3.13274°W | | 1733 | A pair of stone gate piers with a cruciform plan. All the faces have fluted pilasters, and on the south faces are niches with date panels. At the tops are entablatures with pulvinated friezes and finials consisting of lions' heads. | II |
| Tower of former church 53.34823°N 3.13236°W | | 1824 | The stone tower is all that remains of an earlier church, the rest of which has been demolished. It is rectangular, with three stages, and has two bands. On the tower is an inscribed plaque, the bell openings are round-headed and louvred with plain archivolts, and the parapet is embattled. | II |
| Sundial; 53.34823°N 3.13192°W | | 1844 | The sundial is in the churchyard of St. Bartholomew's Church. It is in stone and consists of a chamfered shaft on square steps with a brass plate. The gnomon is missing. | II |
| Former school 53.34899°N 3.13396°W | | 1858–59 | The school has been converted into houses. It is in stone with a slate roof, mainly in a single storey, with four bays. The first bay has two storeys, with buttresses, mullioned windows, a hood moulds, one with foliate decoration, and a pointed entrance. At the right end is a bellcote. | II |
| Barn and granary, Dawpool Farm; 53.34897°N 3.13496°W | | 1862 | The farm buildings are in sandstone with Welsh slate roofs. The barn has fronts of nine and five bays and a twin roof. The barn is linked to the granary by a water tank and a roofed canopy. The southern bay contains a coach house and a stable. | II |
| Cattle sheds, Dawpool Farm; 53.34873°N 3.13459°W | | c. 1865 | The farm buildings are in sandstone with Welsh slate roofs and consist of an irregular range of single-storey buildings around a yard. They incorporate a smithy workshop and an implement shed as well as cattle sheds. The buildings are attached to the barn by a two-storey link building. | II |
| Dawpool Farmhouse; 53.34944°N 3.13399°W | | c. 1865 | The former farmhouse has been converted into flats. It is in stone with Welsh slate roofs, has two storeys and attics, a three-bay front, and two wings at the rear. The front has a central porch and mullioned windows containing casements. At the top are two dormers, between which is a triangular glazed vent. On the right side is a bay window. | II |
| South Lodge; 53.34983°N 3.13424°W | | Late 19th century | The lodge is in sandstone with Welsh slate roofs, and is in Elizabethan style. It has an L-shaped plan, is in 1 1/2 storeys, and each front has two bays. The windows are mullioned and contain sashes, and there is a gabled half-dormer. The iron gates and stone gate piers, which contain carved liver birds, are included in the listing. | II |
| St. Bartholomew's Church; 53.34856°N 3.13217°W | | 1883–86 | The church was designed by J. L. Pearson in early Decorated style. It replaced an earlier church nearby, and is built in sandstone with red tiled roofs. The church consists of a nave, a chancel divided into a choir and a sanctuary, and a south vestry. Above the choir is a tower with pinnacles and a broach spire with lucarnes. | II* |
| Clock Tower; 53.34948°N 3.13439°W | | 1892 | Originally stables by R. Norman Shaw, the building has been converted into a house. It is in stone with a tiled roof, and has two storeys and a front of six bays. The central two bays contain an archway, over which is an attic with a clock face, a cornice, an embattled parapet, and a pyramidal roof. The windows are mullioned, and there are entrances in the second and sixth bays. | II |
| War memorial 53.34870°N 3.13224°W | | Early 1920s | The war memorial is in the churchyard of St. Bartholomew's Church. It is in pink granite, and consists of an obelisk and a wreath, on a four-sided pedimented plinth with a moulded cornice, on a pedestal with a base of two steps on a stone slab. There is an inscription on the plinth, and on the pedestal are the names of those lost in both World Wars. | II |
