= Thomas Henry Ismay =

British ship owner

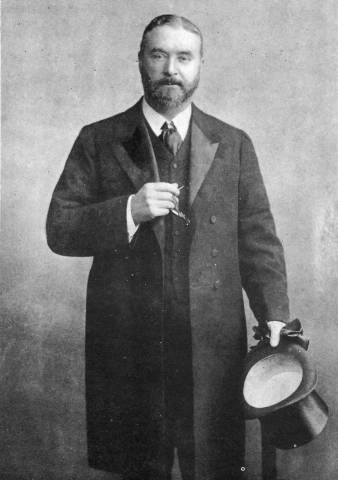
- Born: 7 January 1837; Maryport, Cumberland, England
- Died: 23 November 1899 (aged 62); Dawpool, Thurstaston, Cheshire, England
- Other name: Baccy Ismay
- Occupation: President of White Star Line
- Known for: Heading and running the White Star Line
- Spouse: Margaret Bruce (m. 1859)
- Children: Joseph Bruce Ismay; Charles Bower Ismay (third son 1874–1924)

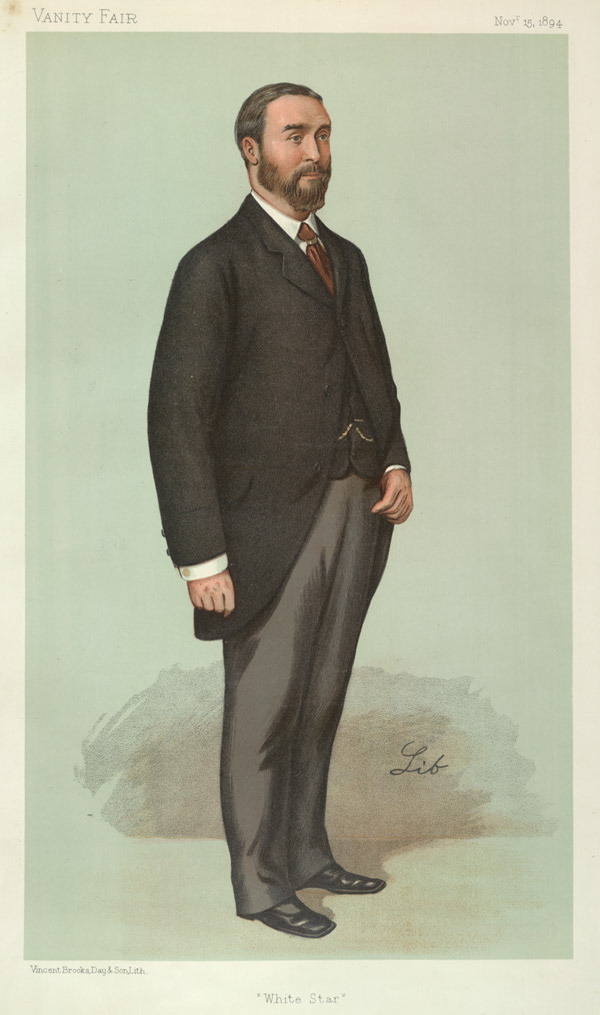
"White Star". Caricature by Lib published in Vanity Fair in 1894.

Thomas Henry Ismay (7 January 1837 – 23 November 1899) was an owner of the White Star Line. His eldest son Joseph Bruce Ismay was managing director of the White Star Line and survived the sinking of its ocean liner RMS Titanic on her maiden voyage in 1912.

== Early years ==
Thomas Ismay was born on 7 January 1837, in a small cottage in the town of Maryport, Cumberland. Some time after Thomas's birth, his father Joseph Ismay started a timber, shipbroking and shipbuilding business. He bought shares in five vessels using Maryport. When Thomas was six, the Ismays moved to a much larger house in Grasslot, Maryport, to accommodate the entire family, including three sisters of Thomas's mother. The house was named "The Ropery", from the ropes used at the nearby shipyard owned by his grandfather. This was the place where he was first employed and he spent much of his time around the harbour. He learned about the sea and navigation and acquired the habit of chewing tobacco, giving him the nickname "Baccy Ismay". When Thomas was 12 he was sent to High School in Brampton, Cumberland. On 31 July 1855 his twin sister Charlotte died, aged 18.

== South American voyage ==
To gain some experience with ships, he arranged a trip to Chile on the S.V. Charles Jackson. She departed Liverpool on 4 January 1856, three days before Ismay's 19th birthday. They arrived on 8 April in Valparaiso, Chile, and stayed there until 30 May. During his stay he sampled the local culture, visiting theatres, climbing mountains and dancing with the natives. He also noted that "Chilean women are said to be the best formed in the world." After his two-month stay, he took the steamer Bogota to Caldera, Chile, and upon arriving there transferred to the SS Conrad. While trying to board the ship early in the morning, when it was still dark, he jumped but missed the ship and fell into the dock. He remained conscious and managed to hold onto a wooden part of the pier. After coughing up seawater, he made a great deal of splashing to attract attention, as his fall had apparently gone unnoticed. He was eventually heard and rescued by rope; however, he lost his hat, broke his watch and ruined his notebook, cigar case and other articles in his bag. At the end of the ten-day voyage he took a train to Copiapo to meet up again with the Charles Jackson. The weather was foul at the start, the ship lost some of her sails and split the topmast, and Ismay was badly hurt after a window smashed in and he cut a toe. He arrived home in autumn 1856.

== Shipping career ==
At the age of 16 Ismay left school and started as an apprentice with shipbrokers Imrie and Tomlinson of Liverpool. Upon completion of the apprenticeship, he set out to gain experience on the high seas. On return to England he started a business in partnership with Philip Nelson, also from Maryport and a friend of his father. The partnership did not last long; Nelson was a retired sea captain and believed in old, trustworthy wooden ships while Ismay believed the future was in iron ships. In 1868 Ismay acquired the flag of the White Star Line.

Ismay had long held an interest in the Asiatic Steam Navigation Company and wished to see how it was run, so he and Gustav Wolff, founder of Harland & Wolff, decided to take a trip to India on board an ASNC steamer. This was partly to see how their rival was managed and partly a family holiday. On 26 October 1887, they left Dawpool and travelled by train across Europe, sight-seeing in France, Switzerland and Italy along the way. Once reaching Italy they joined the SS Nizam, bound for Alexandria. In Egypt the pair visited the Pyramids and cruised on the Nile.

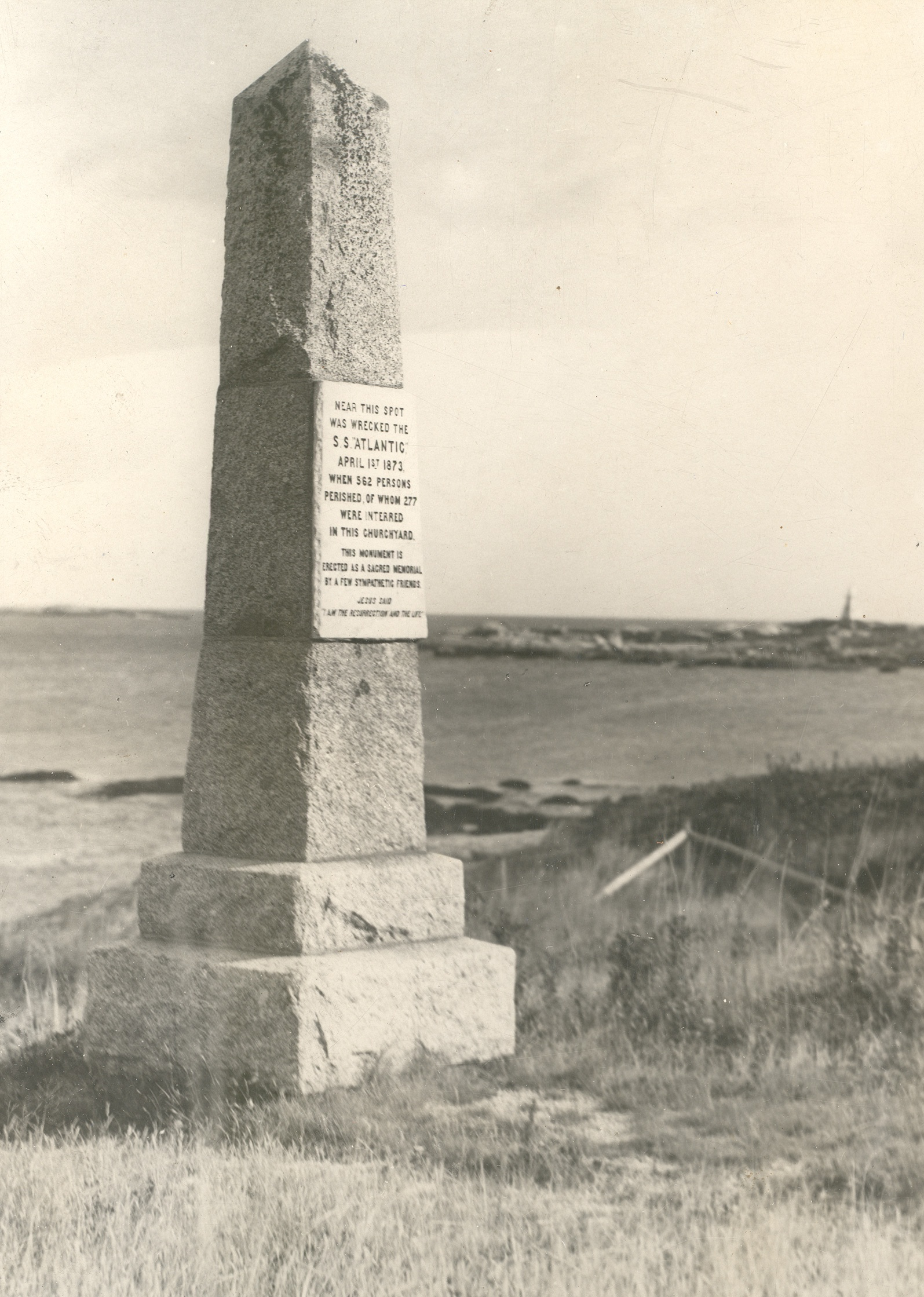
SS Atlantic Memorial donated by Thomas Henry Ismay's family at the site of the mass grave, Terence Bay, Nova Scotia

Around 1870, Ismay drafted a new set of rules and regulations for his brand new trend-setting steamers, RMS Oceanic (1870), RMS Atlantic and the RMS Baltic (1871). In 1873, the Atlantic struck rocks and sank off the coast of Nova Scotia, Canada, killing at least 535 people. It was the greatest disaster for the White Star Line before the loss of the Titanic in 1912.

From 1863 until 1899, Ismay was president of White Star Line and had several ships under his authority. Most of these ships, until 1870, were chartered; even after 1870 most of White Star Line's vessels were chartered from more notable/wealthy shipping lines, so that the company could not be held completely responsible if someone died on board.

=== White Star Line vessels ===
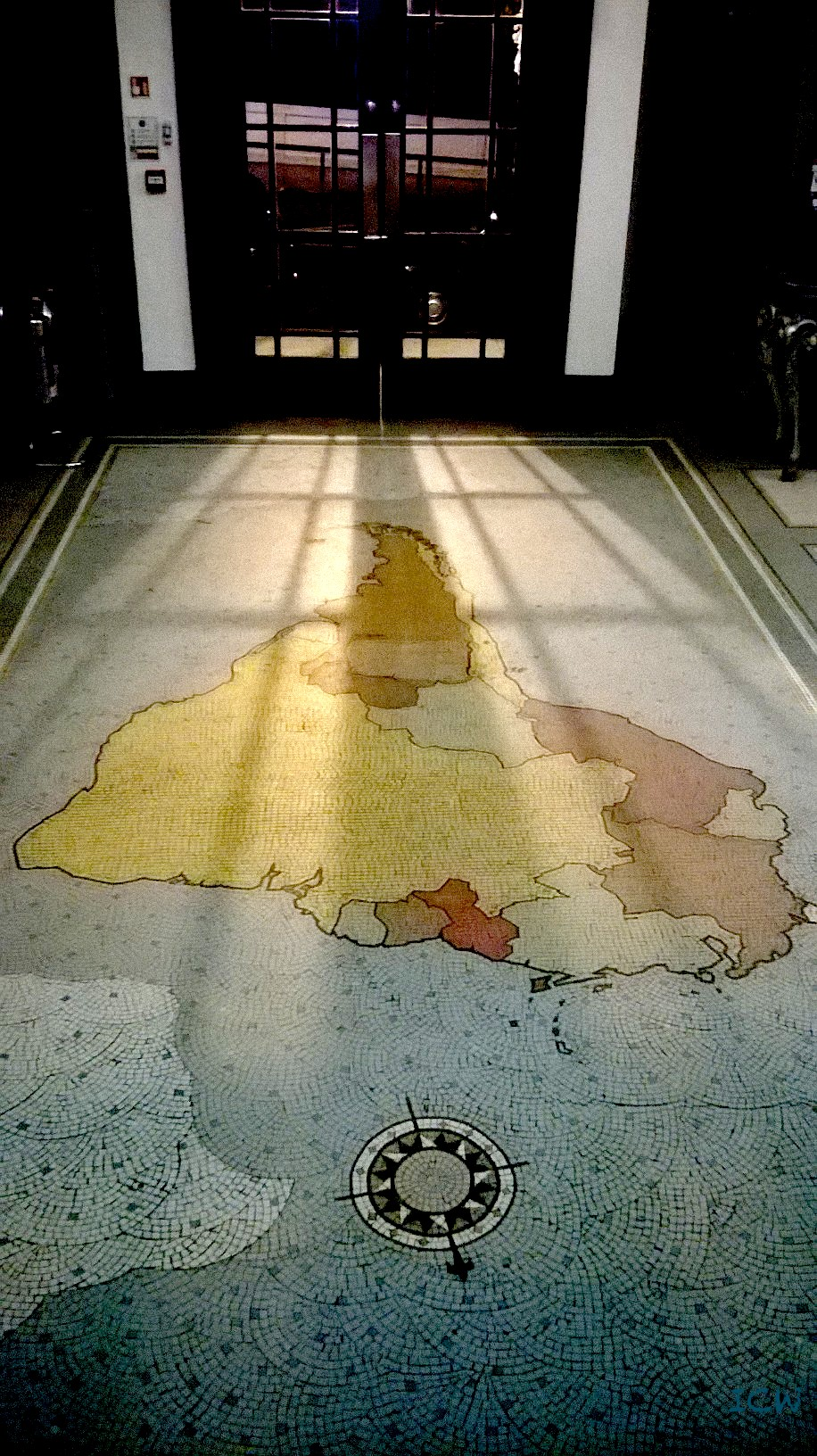
The lobby of Albion House (White Star Line headquarters) in Liverpool

Ulcoats, Cecelia, Golden Sunset, Gladiator, Duke of Edinburgh, Duleep Singh, Bucton Castle, Globe, Nereus, Borrowdale, Weathersfield, British Prince, Dallam Towers, Remington, Hecuba, Pride Of The Thames, Houghton Towers, Warwickshire, Victoria Tower, Hawarden Castle, Vancouver, Castlehead, Vandieman, Comandre, Seatoller, Casma, Compadre, Bayard, British Admiral, Montrose, Ismay, Estrella, Pembroke Castle, Hausquina, Rajah, SS British Navy, Cairnsmore, Santon, Kirkwood, Delhi, Merwanjee Framjee, Ravenscrag, Cape Clear, Grace Gibson, Hannibal, Cardigan Castle, Santiago, Jason, RMS Oceanic (1870) (Oceanic was White Star Line's first true vessel because she was actually ordered by Thomas Ismay)

== Personal life ==
On 7 April 1859, Ismay married Margaret, the daughter of Luke Bruce. In 1867, he acquired the flag and branding of the White Star Line. The family lived at Beach Lawn, Crosby.

During these years he undertook several grand projects including, in July 1882, the building of a private residence in Thurstaston on the Wirral Peninsula, designed by the renowned architect Richard Norman Shaw. Built of a local red sandstone, the property was completed in December 1884. It was named Dawpool and, when Ismay's widow died in 1907, both of his sons declined to take up residence. When the Ismays tried selling the house, the agent said the land would be worth more if the house was blown up and it was eventually sold to a Mr. Rutter who loaned it to the government as a hospital during World War I. In 1926 it was sold to Sir Henry Roberts who had it demolished a year later.

== Death ==
Shortly after the launching of the Oceanic on 14 January 1899, Ismay began to complain of pains in his chest. He had been very active throughout his life and was seldom ill, so his doctor took his pains very seriously. His condition slowly deteriorated and construction of Oceanic's sister ships was delayed. In March of that year, Ismay's health began to improve, and he and Margaret went to Windermere but while there he became ill again. His wife summoned a doctor, who administered morphine. After six days he was feeling better and he returned to Dawpool in Thurstaston. Within six weeks he had more violent pain. The doctor diagnosed a gallstone. By 26 April, Ismay felt well enough to work but in August he collapsed and was confined to bed. On 31 August an operation was performed to alleviate his condition. The operation was unsuccessful and a second became necessary on 4 September. The next morning, in conversation with his wife, he insisted that his daughters go on a voyage on the Oceanic. He asked his wife to arrange for the local church to pray for him. On 14 September Ismay suffered a heart attack. His condition continued to worsen, and, on 23 November 1899, he died at the age of 62. His wife never fully recovered, and she died seven years later.

Ismay and his wife are commemorated with a large chest tomb at St Bartholomew's Church, Thurstaston, inscribed: "Great thoughts, great feelings came to him like instincts unawares" and "Blessed are the pure in heart for they shall see God." Ismay had been one of the patrons of the church, built in 1883–86 by J. L. Pearson.

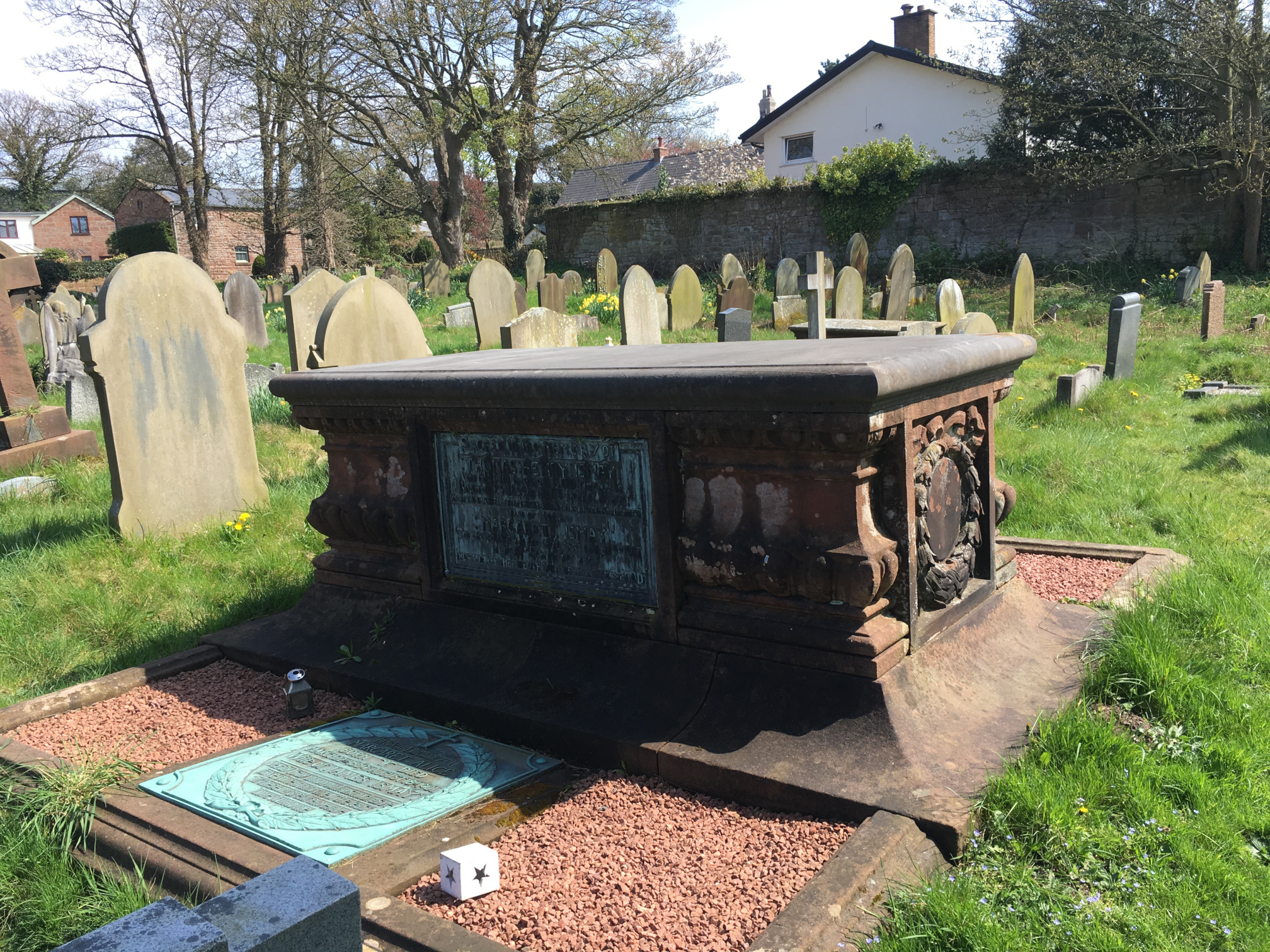
Grave of Thomas Ismay in Thurstaston
