= International Mercantile Marine Company =

Transatlantic shipping group

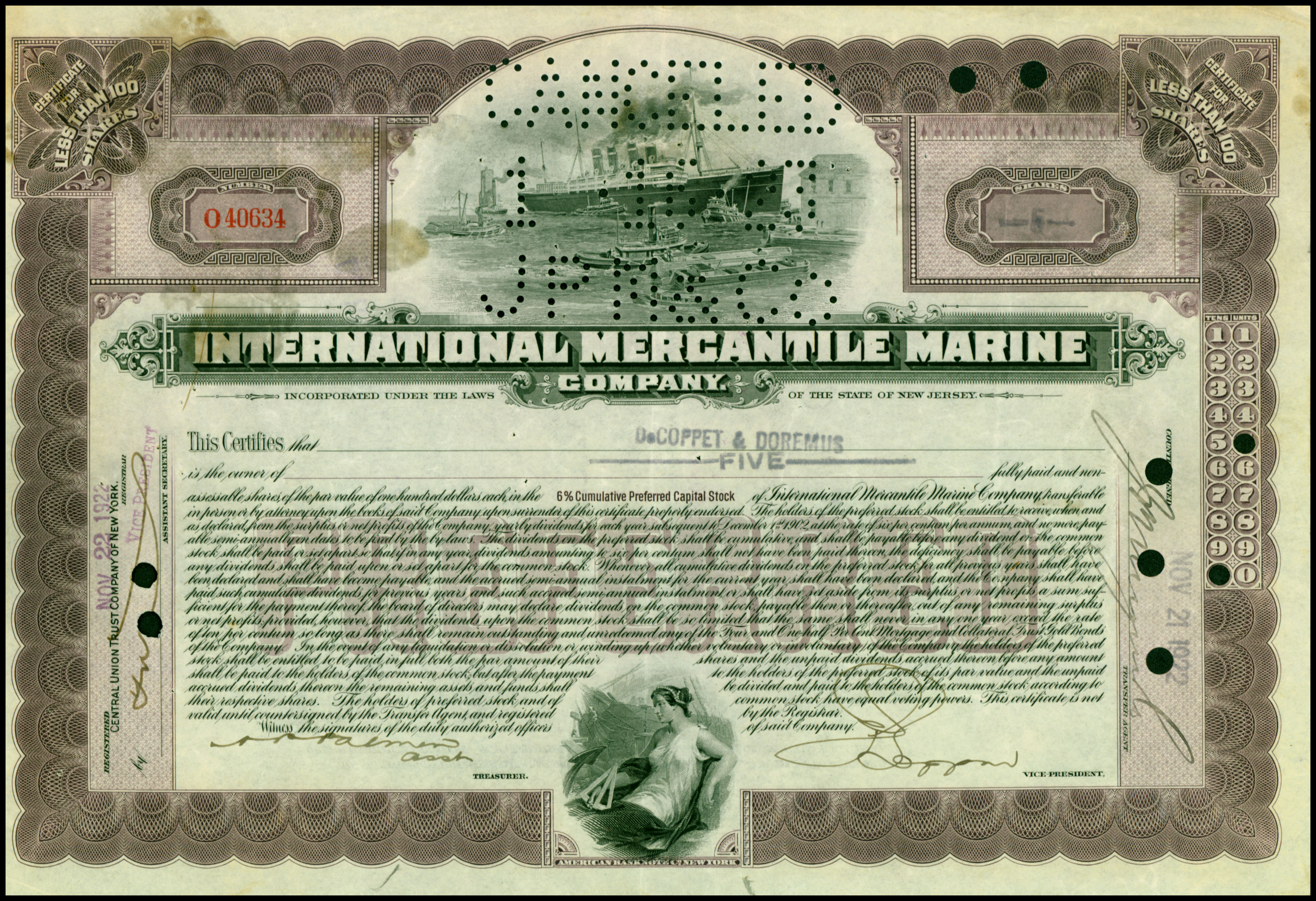
- Type: Public
- Industry: Shipping
- Founded: October 17, 1904; 122 years ago
- Founders: Bernard N. Baker; Sir John Ellerman; Clement Griscom; J. Bruce Ismay; J.P. Morgan
- Defunct: 1931
- Fate: Merged with Roosevelt Steamship Company to form Roosevelt International Mercantile Marine Company

The International Mercantile Marine Company, originally the International Navigation Company, was a trust formed in the early twentieth century as an attempt by J.P. Morgan to monopolize the shipping trade.

IMM was founded by shipping magnates Clement Griscom of the American Line and Red Star Line, Bernard N. Baker of the Atlantic Transport Line, J. Bruce Ismay of the White Star Line, and John Ellerman of the Leyland Line. The Dominion Line was also amalgamated. The project was bankrolled by J.P. Morgan & Co., led by financier J. P. Morgan. The company also had working profit-sharing relationships with the German Hamburg-Amerika and the North German Lloyd lines. The trust caused great concern in the British shipping industry and led directly to the British government's subsidy of the Cunard Line's new ships RMS Lusitania and RMS Mauretania in an effort to compete.

IMM was a holding company that controlled subsidiary corporations that had their own subsidiaries. Morgan hoped to dominate transatlantic shipping through interlocking directorates and contractual arrangements with the railroads, but that proved impossible because of the nature of sea transport, American antitrust legislation, and an agreement with the British government. One of IMM's subsidiaries was the White Star Line, which owned the RMS Titanic.

A proposed subsidy bill in the United States Congress failed, which became widely apparent by April 1902 (Note: and presenting Morgan with the "Hobson's choice" of proceeding with the formation of a probably unprofitable holding company (by consummating the acquisition of White Star as its "crown jewel," but having to probably go without the subsidy envisaged under the Frye-Payne bill), or backing away at the last minute and absorbing considerable losses on the prior purchase of Leyland. Morgan ultimately chose to go ahead and continue putting together his "trust.") and the company thus was never truly successful. Analysis of financial records shows that IMM was overleveraged and suffered from inadequate cash flow that caused it to default on bond interest payments in late 1914. As a result, a "friendly" receivership was put in effect in 1915, which allowed IMM to reorganize its finances; it emerged from the receivership in 1916. Saved by World War I, IMM eventually re-emerged, after a merger with Roosevelt Steamship Company, as the United States Lines, which itself went bankrupt in 1986.

== History ==
=== Founding of the company ===
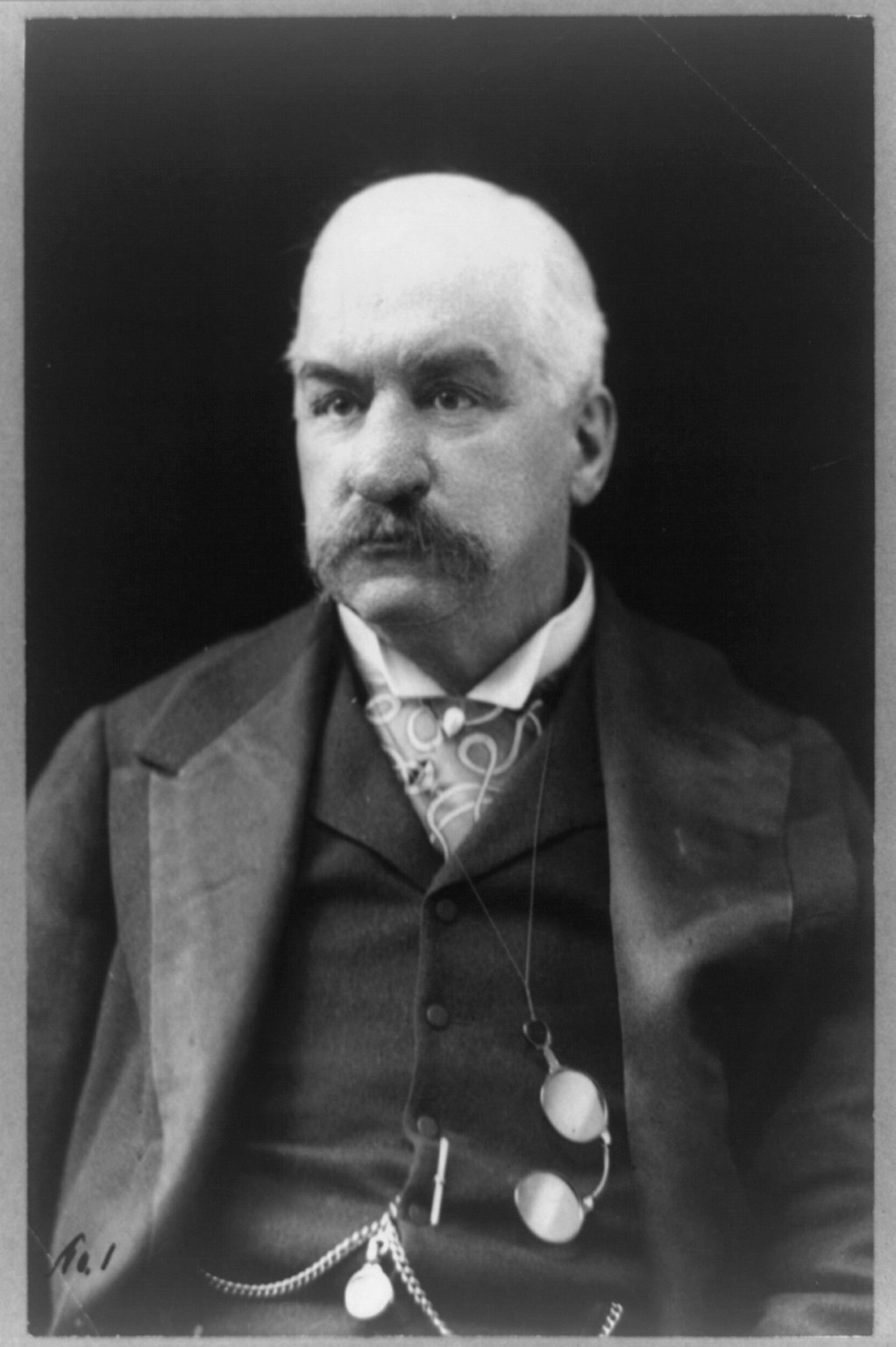
John Pierpont Morgan, founder and owner of the IMM Co.

As the shipping industry prospered in the late 19th century, some sought to create a trust that would monopolize U.S. shipping companies. However, all negotiations in this regard in the 1890s fell short. The intervention of John Pierpont Morgan, one of the richest men in the world, changed that.

The Atlantic Transport Line, owned by Bernard N. Baker and having both passenger and cargo ships, competed intensely with British and other shipping companies. Baker tried to sell his company to John Ellerman, chairman of the cargo-carrying Leyland Line, who had tried unsuccessfully to take possession of the Cunard Line and HAPAG, two powerful European companies. Negotiations between Baker and Ellerman, advanced but ultimately fell through.

Meanwhile, J. P. Morgan had already concluded agreements with Clement Griscom, president of the International Navigation Company, which operated the Red Star Line and the American Line. Finally, in December 1900, after six months of negotiations, the Atlantic Transport Line joined INC.

Subsequently, Baker, J. P. Morgan, and Simon Bettle Jr. (representative of the INC) negotiated with Ellerman, this time with a view to redeem his property. There would be two companies that would join the trust. The name of one of them was revealed in April 1901: the Leyland Line. The second turned out to be the prestigious White Star Line, bought by Morgan's team, after long negotiations, in April 1902. On 1 October 1902, JP Morgan & Co. announced the founding of the International Mercantile Marine Company, more commonly called IMM. (Constituent elements of IMM, including INC (chartered in 1871), had however been operating for many years already.) IMM was incorporated in New Jersey.

=== Golden age ===
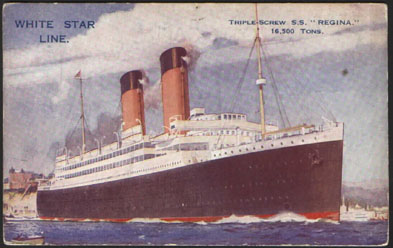
The Regina sailed for the Dominion Line and White Star Line before being transferred to the Red Star Line under the name of Westernland.

Morgan's role evolved over the years. Being American, he could not directly own British ships, but he could own the company that owned the ships. In 1902, the IMM carried 64,738 passengers, a total buoyed by high immigration to the United States. The IMM had signed a partnership with the two most important German shipping companies, Norddeutscher Lloyd and HAPAG, which carried a total of 66,838 passengers. The German-Morgan agreement, signed in New York on 20 February 1902, (Note: Central planks of the agreement included dividend-sharing, route-allocation, and joint committee to oversee the agreement, and suspension in the event of war. A contemporaneous side deal authorized the subsequent acquisition by HAPAG, NDL and IMM of a controlling interest in the Holland-America line (but without the direct advance knowledge of Holland-America's management).) was a key step in the formation of what was to become the IMM, but did not fully address long-standing competitive friction between and amongst the major German and British transatlantic shipping companies.

Responses in the United Kingdom helped intensify these rivalries. Cunard Line, one of the British shipping companies with independent significance, received grants from the British government for the construction of two large ocean liners, the Lusitania and the Mauretania, which were placed into service in late 1907. The competitive response from the IMM group came in 1908 when Harland & Wolff was authorized to build the White Star Line's Olympic-class ocean liner trio: RMS Olympic, RMS Titanic, and HMHS Britannic.

Since 1902, IMM had an agreement with Lord Pirrie, chairman of Harland & Wolff and member of the management of the White Star Line, stating that all the ships of the company would be built by Harland & Wolff. Ships of the company were also shifting from one company to another, like the Belgic, built for the White Star Line, which was transferred to the service of the Red Star Line under the name Belgenland, or the Regina, which became the Westernland. This allowed the IMM to schedule a ship each day from the United Kingdom and allowed passengers to change their tickets to another ship of the company. Baker retired from the direction of the Atlantic Transport Line shortly after its integration with the IMM and was replaced by Philip Franklin. He later became vice president of IMM, while Griscom was replaced as president by Joseph Bruce Ismay in 1904 (who was also president of the White Star Line).

=== Decline ===
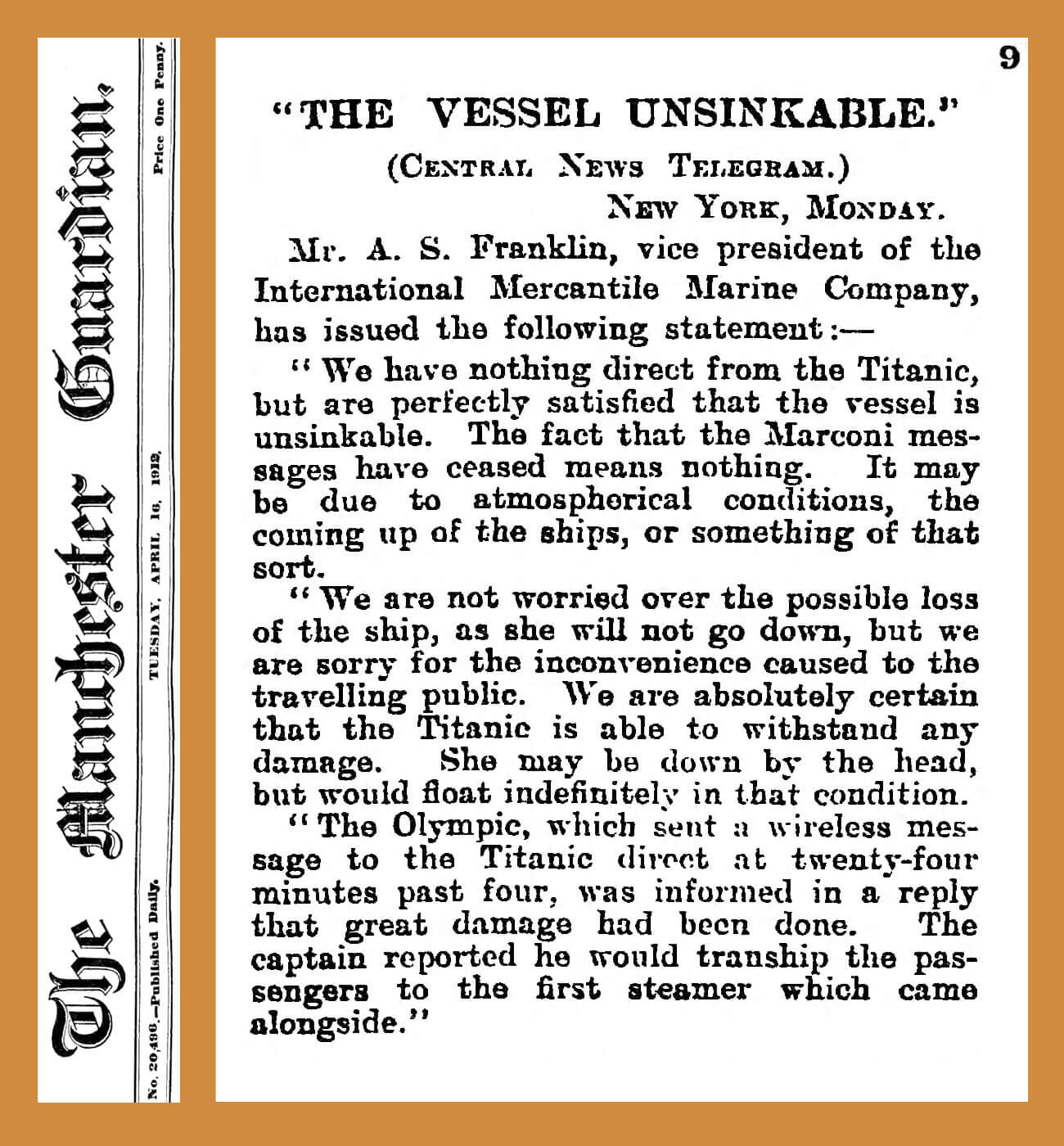
The IMM company vice president released a statement following the sinking of the RMS Titanic, assuring that despite the lack of communication from the ship, she was "unsinkable".

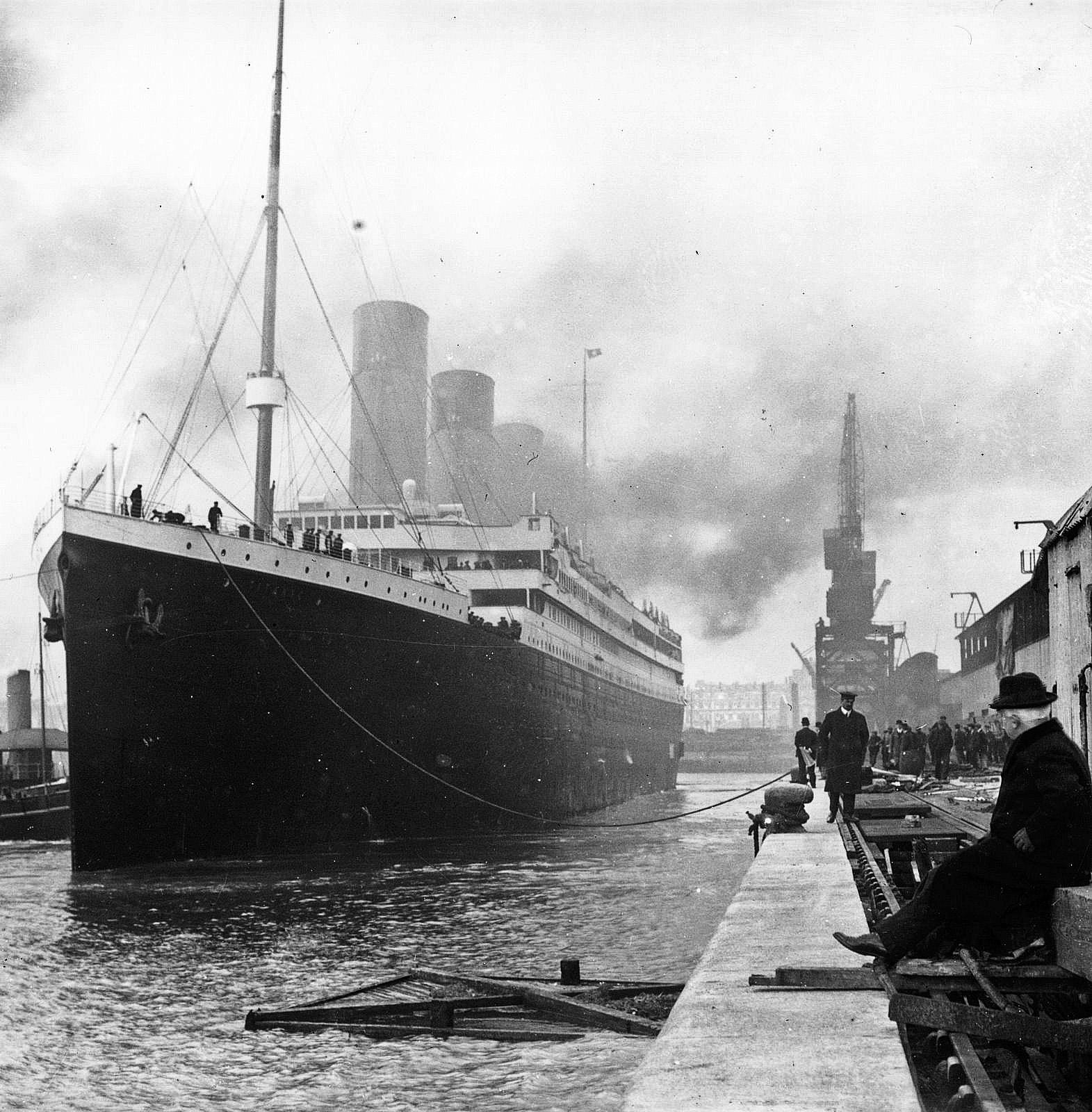
The RMS Titanic at Southampton, before her departure.

The early 1910s marked a turning point for the IMM. Indeed, on 15 April 1912, the Titanic, flagship of its fleet, sank during her maiden voyage. Besides the financial and human losses, the sinking had repercussions on the organization of the trust. Through the American commission of inquiry devoted to the sinking, Senator William Alden Smith openly attacked the very principle of the company and Morgan. As had been arranged before Titanic sank, J. Bruce Ismay retired as president of IMM in 1913 and was succeeded by Harold Sanderson Morgan died on 31 March 1913. After the 1915–16 receivership, Sanderson was succeeded as president by Franklin, who had been the receiver.

However, the sinking of the Titanic did not bring about the end of the IMM. Although theoretically powerful due to its continued influence with some of the top American, British, and German shipping companies, the overseeing company never managed to overcome its own financial problems, nor dominate the bulk of the North Atlantic shipping trade, and was therefore not as successful as expected. The company went into receivership in 1915 and was placed in the hands of Franklin, who managed to save it. In the late 1920s, he received grants from the government to American ships (built in the United States or flying the flag) and in 1926 it sold the White Star Line to the Royal Mail Steam Packet Company for £7 million, of which £2.35 million was still unpaid when the Royal Mail Group, which was overleveraged and undercapitalized, collapsed in the early 1930s. In 1930, IMM possessed 30 vessels. There were 19 in 1933 and only 11 by 1935.

The ailing company merged with the Roosevelt Steamship Company, parent company of the Roosevelt Line, in 1931 to form Roosevelt International Mercantile Marine Company (RIMM). Later in 1931, RIMM acquired the financially troubled United States Lines and began consolidating its operations under that brand. The Atlantic Transport Line was dissolved in late 1931 and its ships were distributed throughout RIMM's remaining divisions.

The American Line was merged into United States Lines in 1932, the Red Star Line was sold to Arnold Bernstein in 1934, Baltimore Mail Line merged into United States Lines in 1937, the Panama Pacific Line was dissolved in 1938 and its ships divested, and American Merchant Line was merged into United States Lines in 1938.

Finally, the Roosevelt Line was merged into United States Lines in 1940, leaving that company as RIMM's only remaining business. RIMM changed its name to United States Lines Inc. in 1943, recasting itself as a smaller company focused exclusively on transatlantic routes under a single brand.

Some businesses of the modern shipping industry still regard IMM as an early attempt at the corporate ownership of several companies under a single trust; the kind of large overseeing companies that dominate much of the maritime shipping world today.

== Presidents ==
- Clement A. Griscom, 1902–1904
- J. Bruce Ismay, 1904–1913
- Harold Sanderson, 1913–1915
- Receivership, 1915–1916
- Philip Albright Small Franklin, 1916–1936
- John A. Franklin, 1936–1943

Company became United States Lines Inc, 1943

== Companies owned by IMM ==
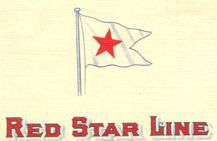
Flag of the Red Star Line

- American Line: 1873–1932
- Inman Line: 1886–1893
- American Merchant Line: 1924–1938
- Holland America Line: 51% share owned 1902–1917
- Atlantic Transport Line: 1901–1931
- Baltimore Mail Line: 1930–1937
- Dominion Line: 1902–1926
- Leyland Line: 1902–1927
- Panama Pacific Line: 1915–1938
- Red Star Line: 1871–1934
- Roosevelt Steamship Company: 1931–1940
- United States Lines: 1931–1943 (continued as IMM's successor company)
- White Star Line: 1902–1927

== See also ==
- International Mercantile Marine Company Building, former New York City headquarters
