= St Bartholomew's Church, Thurstaston =

Coordinates: 53.3485°N 3.1321°W

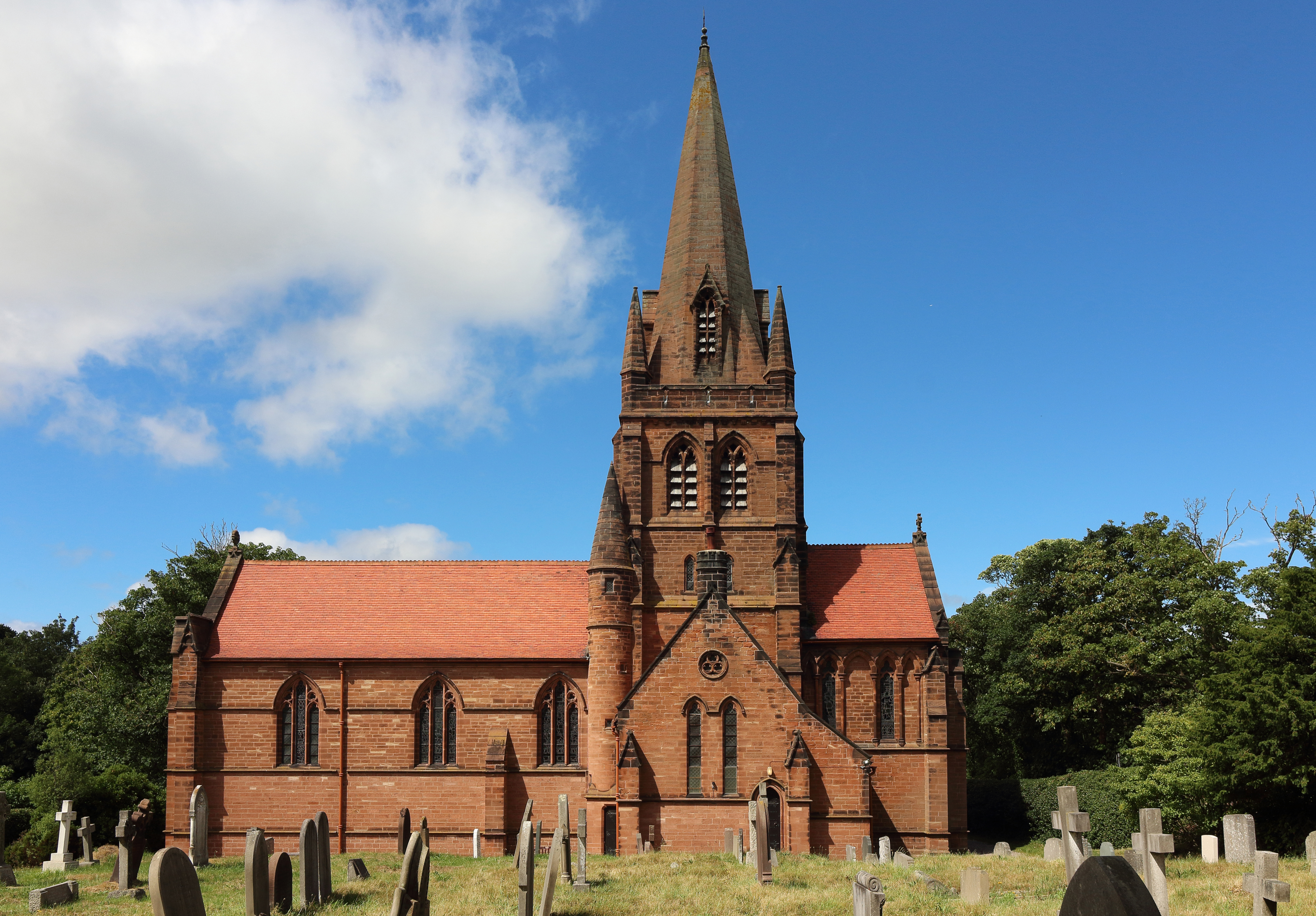
- St Bartholomew's Church, Thurstaston

- Location in Merseyside
- OS grid reference: SJ 247,841
- Location: Thurstaston, Wirral, Merseyside
- Country: England
- Denomination: Anglican
- Website: St Bartholomew, Thurstaston

History
- Status: Parish church
- Dedication: Saint Bartholomew
- Consecrated: 1886

Architecture
- Functional status: Active
- Heritage designation: Grade II*
- Designated: 15 November 1962
- Architect: John Loughborough Pearson
- Architectural type: Church
- Style: Gothic Revival
- Completed: 1885

Specifications
- Materials: Red sandstone with a tiled roof

Administration
- Province: York
- Diocese: Chester
- Archdeaconry: Chester
- Deanery: Wirral North
- Parish: Thurstaston

Clergy
- Rector: Revd Jane Turner

St Bartholomew's Church is in the village of Thurstaston, Wirral, Merseyside, England. It is an active Anglican parish church in the diocese of Chester, the archdeaconry of Chester, and the deanery of Wirral North. The church is recorded in the National Heritage List for England as a designated Grade II* listed building.

== History ==
The earliest mention of a church on the site is around 1125 although other evidence suggests that a church was present in Anglo-Saxon times. In 1724, the Norman church was described as being a "mean building extremely small, low and dark". The church was taken down in 1820, and a new church was completed in 1824. This church was in turn dismantled, although its tower still stands. The new church was designed by J. Loughborough Pearson, and was consecrated in 1886. A lychgate was erected in memory of Thomas Henry Ismay of Dawpool in 1900.

== Architecture ==
=== Exterior ===
The church is built in red sandstone, and has a tiled roof. Its plan consists of a three-bay nave, a chancel divided into a choir and a sanctuary, and a south vestry. Above the choir is a tower with a spire. The west end has angle buttresses and a tall three-light window. On the north and south sides of the nave are three three-light windows. On the north side of the tower are gabled buttresses flanking a three-light window. The bell stage has louvred, paired bell openings. Above this is a cornice, simple pinnacles at the corners and a broach spire with louvred lucarnes. To the southwest of the tower is a round turret with a conical roof. The east window has five lights.

=== Interior ===
The authors of the Buildings of England series describe the interior as "superb", particularly in the way that the visitor experiences "increasing richness" when "progressing eastwards". There are arches at the entrance to the chancel and the sanctuary. The reredos is in alabaster, and depicts a relief of the Resurrection; this is surrounded by angels in niches. The pulpit is in alabaster, and has pierced panels. The font is octagonal, made of Mexican onyx on Blue John shafts and coloured marble steps. A sedilia is on the south wall of the chancel. Also in the church is a dole cupboard dated 1723. The organ case is dated 1905, designed by Norman Shaw, with panels painted by Robert Christie. Some of the stained glass is by Clayton and Bell. Above the door are the arms of Queen Anne. On the wall at the west end of the church are white marble tablets commemorating members of the Whitmore and Glegg families. The two-manual organ was built by Henry Willis & Sons in 1905 and designed by Dr A. L. Peace, organist of St George's Hall, Liverpool. It was rebuilt by the same firm in 1963, and further modifications were made in 1985 by Rushworth and Dreaper, and in 1994 by Keith Ledson. There is a ring of six bells, all cast by John Taylor & Co, five of which are dated 1886 and the sixth 2002.

== Exterior features ==
Near the church is the tower of the previous church which is dated 1824. It is built in three stages with an embattled parapet and is a Grade II listed building. In the churchyard is a stone sundial dated 1844 which is also listed at Grade II. Also in the churchyard is a 17th-century stone font with an octagonal bowl and a rounded stem, and the ancient stone coffin lid of a child. In addition the churchyard contains the war graves of a World War I Middlesex Regiment officer, and an airman, Royal Engineers soldier and Lancashire Fusiliers officer of World War II. The tomb of Thomas Henry Ismay (1837–99), founder of the White Star Line, stands close to the old tower. It was designed by Richard Norman Shaw.

== See also ==
- Grade II* listed buildings in Merseyside
- List of new ecclesiastical buildings by J. L. Pearson
- Listed buildings in Thurstaston
