= Baltimore Mail Line =

American transatlantic shipping company

Baltimore Mail Steamship Company
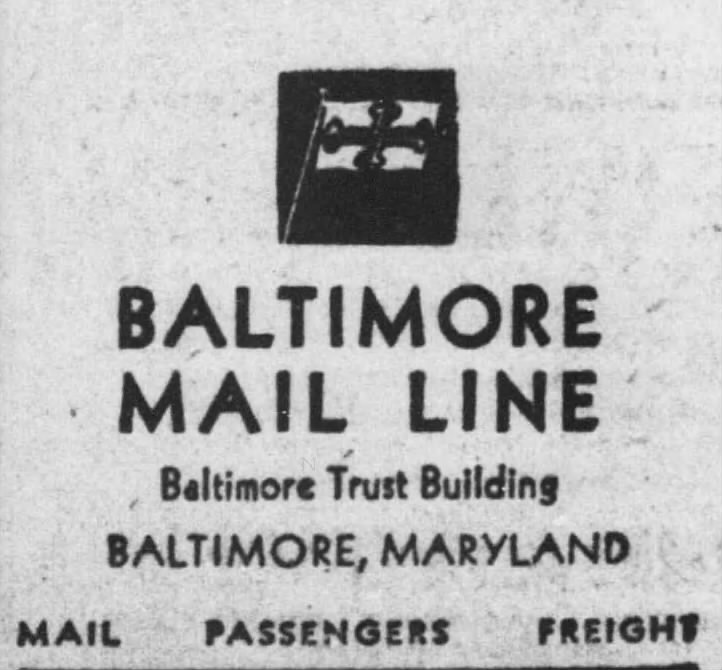
- Type: Privately held company
- Industry: Shipping, transportation, passenger liners
- Founded: 1930 in Baltimore, Maryland, United States
- Defunct: 1937
- Headquarters: 1419 G Street, NW, Baltimore, Maryland, United States
- Area served: Atlantic Ocean shores

Baltimore Mail Line, officially the Baltimore Mail Steamship Company, was a short-lived American transatlantic shipping company that operated primarily as a mail carrier with limited passenger service from 1930 to 1937.

It provided weekly sailings between the U.S. ports of Baltimore, Maryland, and Norfolk, Virginia, and the European ports of Le Havre, France, and Hamburg, Germany, with calls sometimes including Southampton or Bremen. The line was notable for its one-class (tourist-class) passenger accommodations on converted cargo ships, offering affordable transatlantic travel during the early years of the Great Depression.

== History ==
The Baltimore Mail Steamship Company was incorporated in the state of Maryland on July 7, 1930. Its formation aimed to restore direct passenger, freight, and mail service from Baltimore to European ports, filling a gap left since the suspension of North German Lloyd services in 1918.

Significant federal support enabled its launch. In July 1930, reports indicated that the United States Shipping Board would advance a substantial loan—approximately $5 million, covering about three-quarters of the reconditioning costs—while the Post Office Department prepared a mail contract expected to generate nearly $1 million annually in revenue. The five ships were purchased from the Shipping Board for $50,000 each.

The vessels, originally Eclipse-class freighters built in 1918 at Bethlehem Shipbuilding Corporation in Alameda, California (and related yards), underwent extensive conversion at the Federal Shipbuilding Corporation in New York (a U.S. Steel subsidiary). Work included narrower bows, remodeled sterns, increased speed from about 10 to 16 knots, and installation of passenger accommodations for roughly 80–100 people per ship. Total reconditioning costs were estimated at around $1.5 million per vessel.

The mail contract (Route No. 46) paid $6 per mile for U.S. mail to Germany via Baltimore and Hampton Roads, with provisions potentially allowing for faster future ships.

The Baltimore Mail Line emerged in the context of efforts to restore and expand U.S. merchant marine services on the North Atlantic following World War I. It filled a gap in direct passenger and mail service from Baltimore to Europe; the last such regular service by Norddeutscher Lloyd had ended in 1918. The United States government, through the United States Shipping Board financed $10 million towards establishment of the new company.

Service officially began on July 2, 1931, when the flagship SS City of Baltimore sailed from Baltimore with about 80 passengers on its maiden voyage to Le Havre and Hamburg. The departure carried official greetings from Baltimore Mayor Howard W. Jackson to European civic leaders, emphasizing hopes for strengthened commercial ties, particularly with Germany.

The company operated under the Roosevelt Steamship Co. (associated with the International Mercantile Marine Company) in some timetables and was later connected to broader U.S. shipping consolidations. United States Lines absorbed the Baltimore Mail Line in 1937. Its assets were subsequently transferred to the Panama Pacific Line in 1938, ending independent operations after roughly seven years.

== See also ==
- United States Mail Steamship Company
- United States Lines
- Panama Pacific Line
