= Dawpool, Thurstaston =

Country house in Thurstaston, Wirral, Merseyside, England

Coordinates: 53.3505°N 3.1347°W

General information
- Year built: 1882
- Demolished: 1927

Design and construction
- Architect: Richard Norman Shaw

Dawpool was a country house in the village of Thurstaston, Wirral, Merseyside, England. It was built for the shipowner Thomas Henry Ismay in 1882–86 and designed by Richard Norman Shaw. Ismay died in 1899, the family moved out of the house in 1907, and it was demolished in 1927. Parts of the house were re-used in other buildings. Two buildings associated with the house, a lodge and the stables, have survived and are listed buildings.

== History ==
The estate of Dawpool was bought in 1877 by Thomas Henry Ismay, owner of the White Star Line. He demolished the house on the site and commissioned Richard Norman Shaw to design a new house. (Note: Shaw later designed Albion House in Liverpool as headquarters for the shipping line.) The house was built between 1882 and 1886. Ismay died in 1899 at Dawpool, and the family moved out of the house in 1907. It was then sold to F. W. P. Rutter and was used as an orthopaedic hospital for officers in the First World War. The house was later sold to Sir Henry Roberts, and demolished in 1927. Before the house was demolished a sale was held and parts of the house were re-used elsewhere. The large chimneypiece from the dining room went to form part of the entrance to what is now a restaurant in Borough Road, Birkenhead. Another immense fireplace was reused at Portmeirion as the main facade of a building, the Pantheon. Parts of other chimneypieces went to private houses in Heswall and Bebington, and other pieces went to Llandudno, and to Iwerne Minster House, in Dorset. A smaller house was later built on the site.

== Description and appraisal ==
Dawpool was a large house, built in sandstone, and in Tudor style. It was asymmetrical, and its features included gables, bay windows, and large mullioned windows. Inside the house was a large gallery with a barrel vaulted ceiling. The house reputedly cost over £50,000 to build, and the materials used were of the highest quality. Hartwell et al comment that it was one of Shaw's major works, and one of the first of his to be destroyed. However de Figueiredo and Treuherz comment that the house showed Shaw "at his most grim and stark", and that it was a "dark, forbidding house". It was not liked by other members of the family, Ismay's wife commenting that "the house had served its purpose in keeping [her husband] amused for fifteen years".

== Associated structures ==
Two buildings also designed by Shaw and associated with the house have survived, a lodge and the stables. The lodge stands at the entrance to the drive. It is in sandstone with a Welsh slate roof, and has an L-shaped plan. Its gate piers are inscribed with liver birds, a symbol of Liverpool. The lodge, its gates and gate piers are recorded in the National Heritage List for England as a designated Grade II listed building. Opposite the lodge, and on the other side of the road are the former stables, which have been converted into a house known as The Clock Tower. The building is in stone with tiled roofs, with two storeys and a six-bay front. The middle two bays rise to a greater height, contain a clock face, and have an embattled parapet and a pyramidal roof. This building is also designated Grade II.

== Gallery ==
Entrance front

Garden front

Dining room

Chimney piece in picture gallery

Main floor plan

West elevation

South elevation

Interior section

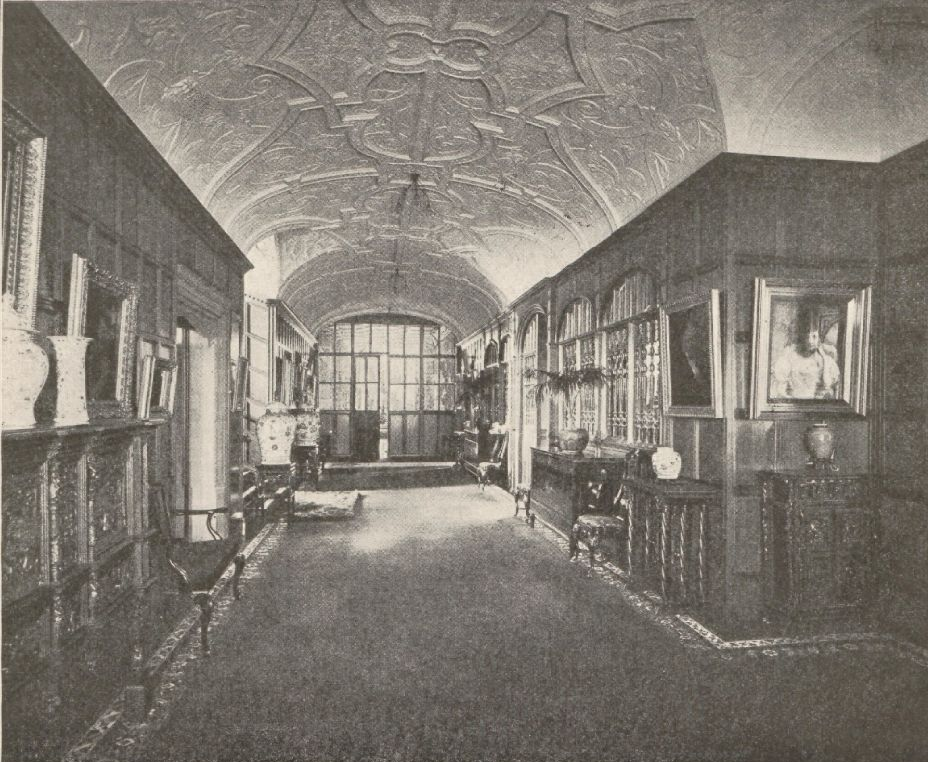
Hall
