= Thurstaston =

Village on the Wirral Peninsula, Merseyside, England

Coordinates: 53.347°N 3.133°W

- Village
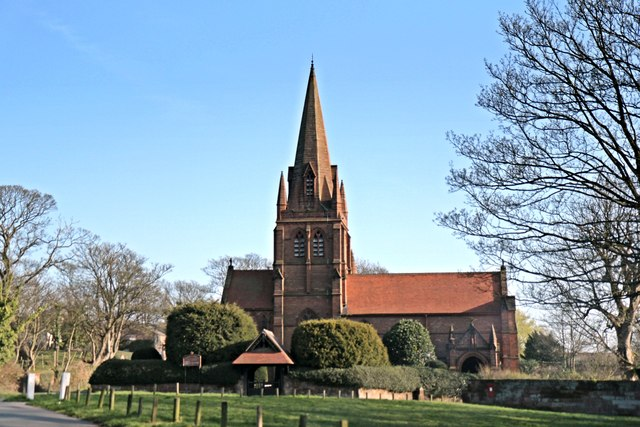
- St Bartholomew's Church, Thurstaston

- Location within Merseyside
- Population: 160 (2001 census)
- OS grid reference: SJ246839
  - London: 179 mi (288 km) SE
- Metropolitan borough: Wirral
- Metropolitan county: Merseyside
- Region: North West
- Country: England
- Sovereign state: United Kingdom
- Post town: WIRRAL
- Postcode district: CH61
- Dialling code: 0151
- ISO 3166 code: GB-WRL
- Police: Merseyside
- Fire: Merseyside
- Ambulance: North West
- UK Parliament: Wirral West

Thurstaston (/ˈθɜːstəstən/ THUR-stə-stən) is a village and former civil parish, in the Wirral district, in Merseyside, England, on the Wirral Peninsula. It is part of the West Kirby and Thurstaston Ward and the parliamentary constituency of Wirral West. The village lies on the A540 road between Heswall and Caldy, although it extends some distance down Station Road to the Wirral Way and the Dee Estuary.

At the time of the 2001 census, the village itself had only 160 inhabitants, although the national census included Caldy and parts of Irby, bringing the total population to 15,548.

== History ==
Thurstaston means "village of a man called Thorsteinn/Þorsteinn", from the Old Norse personal name Thorsteinn/Þorsteinn and Old English tún "farm, village". A record of the name as Torstestiune in 1048 proves this origin. The village was mentioned in the Domesday Book of 1086 as Turstanetone. Historically and popularly, the name was wrongly thought to refer to "Thor's Stone", a sandstone outcrop on Thurstaston Common.

A Viking settlement called Straumby once existed in Tinker's Dale, near the modern-day Thurstaston Visitor Centre.

The village is centred on the church of St Bartholomew and Thurstaston Hall, parts of which date from 1350, although most of the current building dates from between 1680 and 1835. A ghostly "white lady" is said to haunt the Hall.

The earliest mention of a Church occurs around 1125, but other evidence suggests that one may have existed in Saxon times. The Norman church endured for many hundreds of years but was eventually taken down in 1820 and a second edifice, a plain stone building, was completed in 1824. In 1871, the executors of Joseph Hegan of Dawpool set apart £4,500 for a new church to be erected in his memory. This was designed in late-13th-century mid-gothic style by John Loughborough Pearson, also the architect of Truro Cathedral, and was built entirely of local sandstone; it was consecrated in 1886. Although nothing remains of the earlier Norman church, the tower of the second one still stands in the churchyard and the sandstone of the building was used to construct a wall enclosing the new churchyard.

In 1882, the Liverpool shipowner Thomas Ismay, founder of White Star Line, built his mansion 'Dawpool' at Thurstaston; Ismay is said to have used his influence to ensure that the West Kirby–Hooton railway be routed a mile away along the Dee Estuary, rather than closer to the village. He was also successful in moving the main Heswall to West Kirby road, which came too close to the doorstep of his mansion, via a cutting through Thurstaston Hill. Ismay is buried in the nearby St Bartholomew's churchyard. The solidly built 'Dawpool', designed by Richard Norman Shaw, was demolished by explosives in 1927.

Still standing in the village is the original building of Dawpool Primary School, now a private house.

Thurstaston railway station, on the Chester and Birkenhead Railway branch line from Hooton to West Kirby opened in 1886. During World War II, the station was used to unload munitions to service the anti-aircraft guns that had been installed nearby on Lever Brothers' camp site. Passenger services ended in 1954, although goods transport on the line continued until its complete closure in 1962.

=== Civic history ===
Thurstaston, including the hamlet of Dawpool, was a parish within the Wirral Hundred, in the county of Cheshire. It became a civil parish in 1866. The population was 112 in 1801, 98 in 1851, 141 in 1901 and 151 in 1951.

From 1894, Thurstaston was part of Wirral Rural District, then Wirral Urban District from 1933. On 1 April 1974, local government reorganisation in England and Wales resulted in most of Wirral, including Thurstaston, transfer from the county of Cheshire to Merseyside. The parish was also abolished on 1 April 1974.

== Geography ==
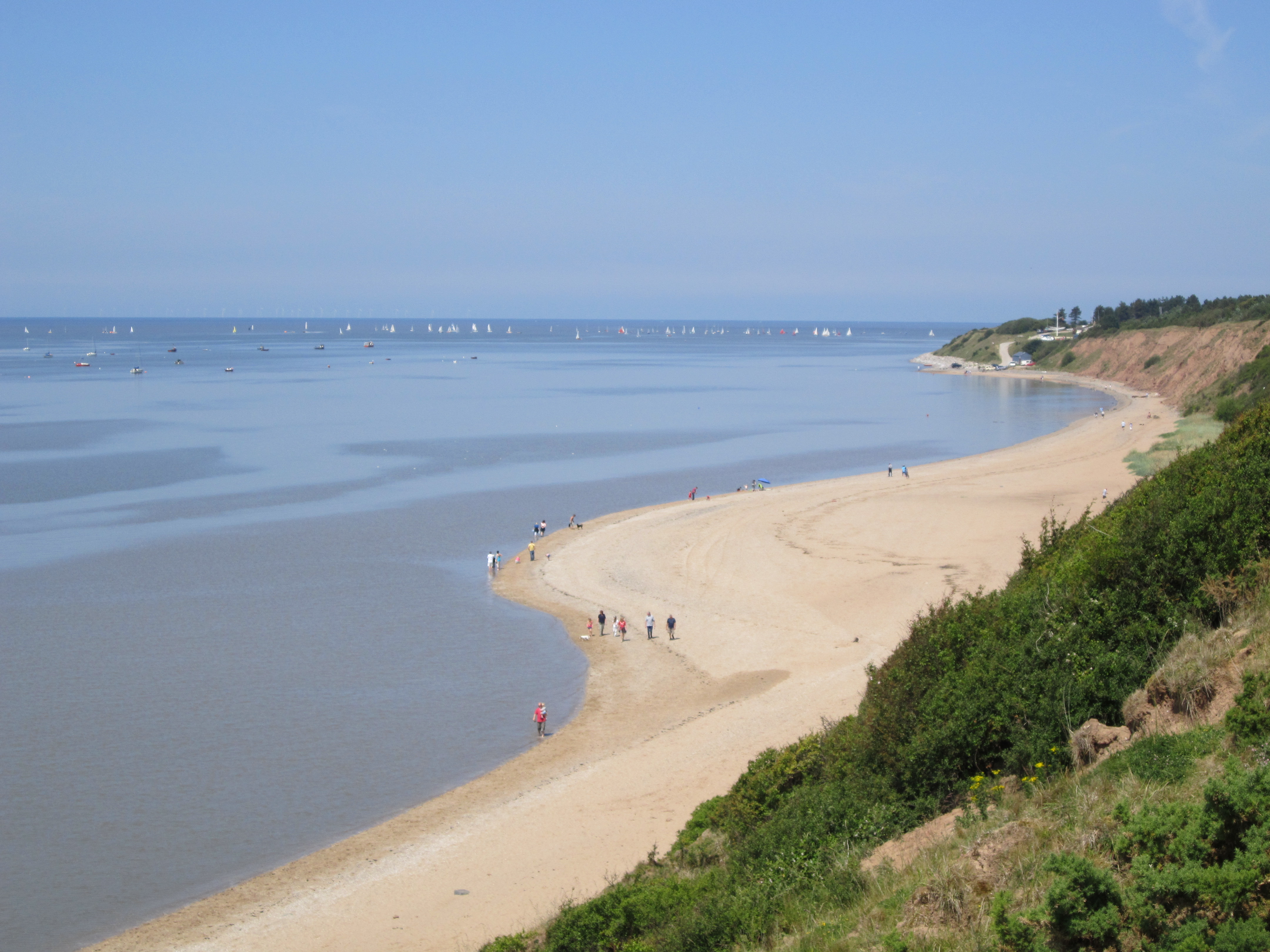
Thurstaston beach

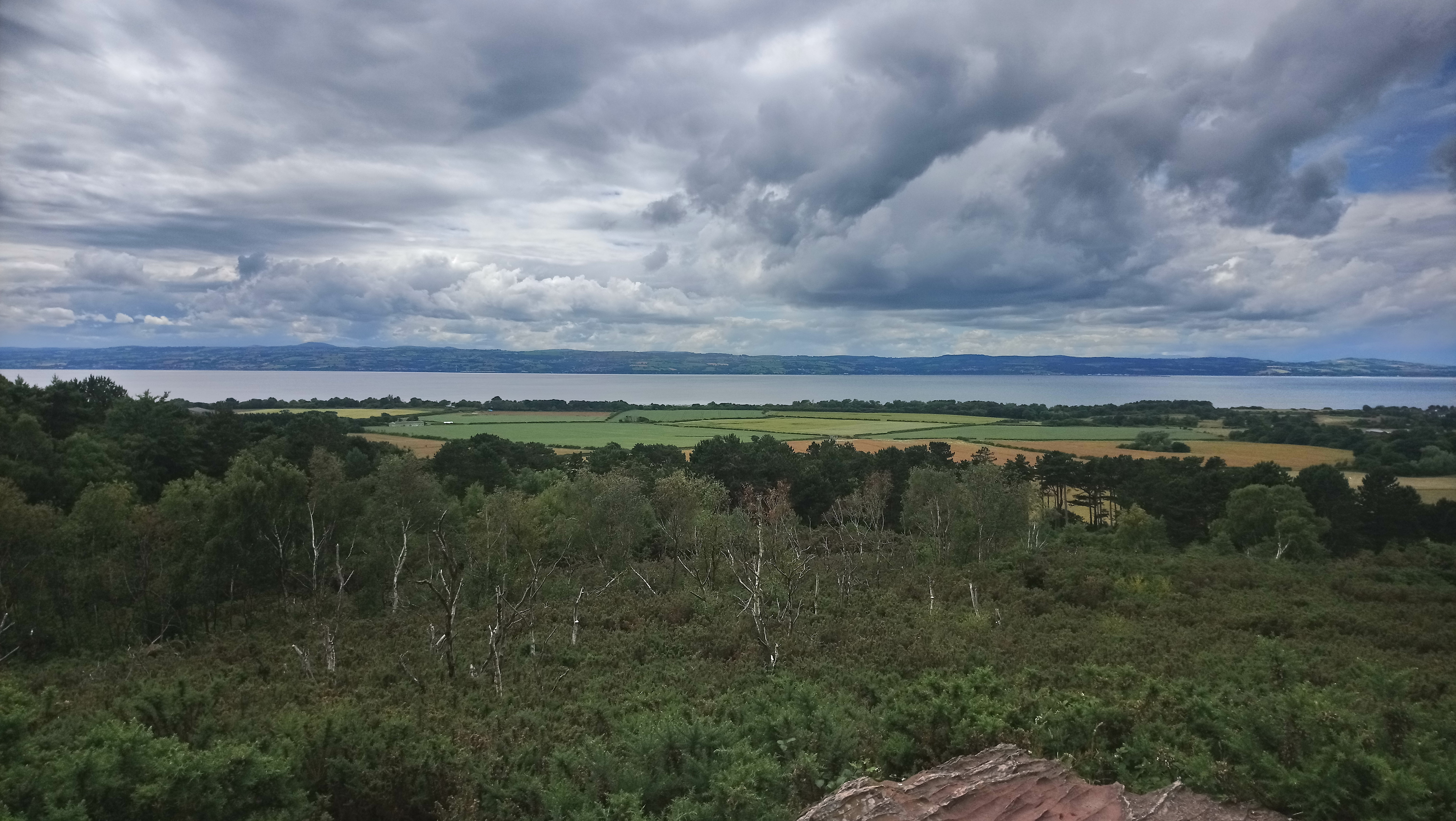
The view towards the river Dee and Wales from Thurstaston Hill

Thurstaston is notable for the large areas of parkland and heathland. Thurstaston Common is a Site of Special Scientific Interest (SSSI) and a local nature reserve. Nearby is Thurstaston Hill, a 298-foot (91 m) Triassic sandstone ridge and one of the highest points on the Wirral. On the eastern side of the hill is Thorstone Rock, a large sandstone mound which was reputed, in early times, to have been thrown by the Norse god Thor.

The offices and a visitor centre of Wirral Country Park are near the site of Thurstaston railway station; the former trackbed became part of the Wirral Way rail trail. The visitor centre contains displays relevant to the local ecology.

== Governance ==
Thustaston is part of the parliamentary constituency of Wirral West. The MP has bern Matthew Patrick of the Labour party since 2024.

At local government level the village is within the West Kirby and Thurstaston Ward of the Metropolitan Borough of Wirral, in the metropolitan county of Merseyside. Thurstaston is represented on Wirral Metropolitan Borough Council by three councillors.

== Transport ==
To the east of the village is the A540, which runs from Hoylake to Chester; the section between Caldy and Heswall is named Telegraph Road. It intersects at a roundabout with Thurstaston Road, which heads north-easterly towards Irby.

Since the closure of Thurstaston station and the Chester and Birkenhead Railway branch line in 1962, West Kirby, on the Wirral line of the Merseyrail network, and Heswall, on the Borderlands line, are the nearest stations to the village.

Bus services are operated predominantly by Arriva North West, Stagecoach Merseyside and Al's Coaches. Routes connect the area with Liverpool, Birkenhead, Chester and West Kirby.

== See also ==
- Listed buildings in Thurstaston
