= J. Bruce Ismay =

English businessman (1862–1937)

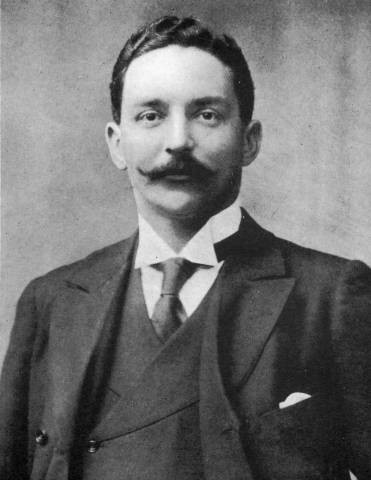
- Ismay in 1896
- Born: 12 December 1862; Crosby, Lancashire, England
- Died: 17 October 1937 (aged 74); Mayfair, London, England
- Resting place: Putney Vale Cemetery
- Occupations: Shipowner; Businessman
- Title: Chairman and managing director of the White Star Line (1899–1913); President of the International Mercantile Marine Company (1904–1913)
- Spouse: Julia Florence Schieffelin (m. 1888)
- Children: 5
- Parents: Thomas Henry Ismay (father); Margaret Bruce (mother)
- Relatives: Inman Sealby (second cousin)

Joseph Bruce Ismay (/ˈɪzmeɪ/; 12 December 1862 – 17 October 1937) was an English businessman and shipowner who was the chairman and managing director of the White Star Line, and president of the International Mercantile Marine Company until his retirement in 1913.

Ismay took over the White Star Line after the death of his father Thomas Ismay in 1900. In 1904, he became one of the founders of the International Mercantile Marine Company, a maritime trust financed by J. P. Morgan. Under his direction, the White Star Line shifted their focus to comfort and size instead of speed. He was behind the creation of the Big Four-class, at the time the world's largest liners. After the rival Cunard Line put out the RMS Lusitania and RMS Mauretania, the largest and fastest ships in the world, Ismay green-lighted the building of the Olympic-class and ordered the building of three large liners with focus on comfort and safety.

The first of these ships were the RMS Olympic and the RMS Titanic and Ismay made a point of joining both ships on their maiden voyages as a passenger. Consequently, he was aboard the Titanic when the ship had its fatal collision with an iceberg. Subsequently, he became the highest-ranking White Star official to survive the ship's sinking, taking his place on one of the last boats to be successfully launched, Collapsible Boat C. Ismay was subsequently criticised by the press for surviving the sinking in the immediate aftermath of the disaster, and his reputation never fully recovered during his lifetime.

Ismay remained in public life after his retirement from the White Star Line, pursuing numerous business ventures as well as charity work. Late in his life, he was diagnosed with diabetes and one of his legs was amputated. Ismay died shortly after suffering from a stroke in October 1937 and is buried in Putney Vale Cemetery in London.

== Early life ==
Joseph Bruce Ismay was born on 12 December 1862 in Crosby, Lancashire. He was the son of Thomas Henry Ismay (7 January 1837 – 23 November 1899) and Margaret Bruce (13 April 1837 – 9 April 1907), daughter of ship-owner Luke Bruce.

Thomas Ismay was the senior partner in Ismay, Imrie and Company and the founder of the White Star Line. (Note: Oceanic Steam Navigation Company was generally known as White Star Line, which was the name of the company purchased by Thomas Ismay.) He played football as a young man and was a member of the Liverpool Ramblers A.F.C. club.

The younger Ismay was educated at Elstree School and Harrow, then tutored in France for a year. He was apprenticed at his father's office for 4 years, after which he toured the world. He then went to New York City as the company representative, eventually rising to the rank of agent.

On 4 December 1888, Ismay married Julia Florence Schieffelin (5 March 1867 – 31 December 1963), daughter of George Richard Schieffelin and Julia Matilda Delaplaine of New York, with whom he had five children:

- Margaret Bruce Ismay (29 December 1889 – 15 May 1967), who married George Ronald Hamilton Cheape (1881–1957) in 1912
- Henry Bruce Ismay (3 April 1891 – 1 October 1891)
- Thomas Bruce Ismay (18 February 1894 – 27 April 1954), who married Jane Margaret Seymour, a daughter of Walter Seymour of Ballymore Castle, County Galway, Ireland, in 1922.
- Evelyn Constance Ismay (17 July 1897 – 9 August 1940), who married Basil Sanderson (1894–1971), son of fellow shipowner Harold Sanderson, in 1927
- George Bruce Ismay (6 June 1902 – 30 April 1943), who married Florence Victoria Edrington in 1926.

In 1891, Ismay returned with his family to the United Kingdom and became a partner in his father's firm, Ismay, Imrie and Company. In 1899, Thomas Ismay died, and Bruce Ismay became head of the family business. Ismay had a head for business, and the White Star Line flourished under his leadership. In addition to running his ship business, Ismay also served as a director of several other companies. In 1901, he was approached by Americans who wished to build an international shipping conglomerate – to be known as the International Mercantile Marine Company – to which Ismay agreed to sell his firm.

== Chairman of the White Star Line ==
After the death of his father on 23 November 1899, Bruce Ismay succeeded him as the chairman of the White Star Line. He decided to build four ocean liners to surpass the RMS Oceanic built by his father. The ships were dubbed the Big Four: RMS Celtic, RMS Cedric, RMS Baltic, and RMS Adriatic. These vessels were designed more for size and luxury than for speed.

In 1902, Ismay oversaw the sale of the White Star Line to J.P. Morgan & Co., which was organising the formation of International Mercantile Marine Company, an Atlantic shipping trust which absorbed several major American and British shipping lines. IMM was a holding company that controlled subsidiary operating corporations. Morgan hoped to dominate transatlantic shipping through interlocking directorates and contractual arrangements with the railroads, but that proved impossible because of the unscheduled nature of sea transport, American antitrust legislation, and an agreement with the British government. White Star Line became one of the IMM operating companies and, in February 1904, Ismay became president of the IMM, with the support of Morgan.

== RMS Titanic ==
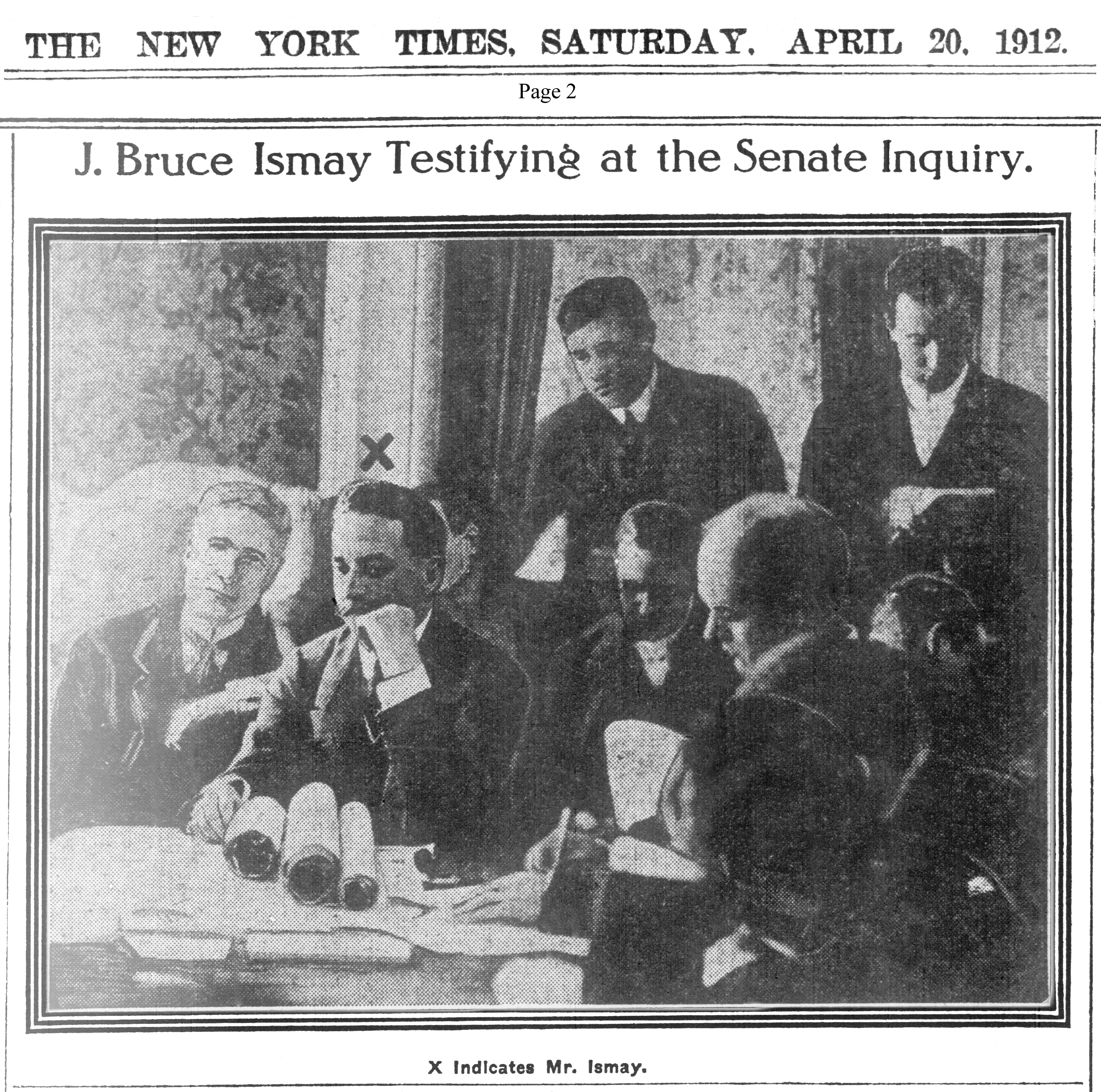
Within five days of the sinking, The New York Times published several columns relating to Ismay's conduct—concerning which "there has been so much comment". Columns included the statement of passenger Karl Behr indicating Ismay had helped supervise loading of passengers in lifeboats, and of William E. Carter stating that he and Ismay boarded a lifeboat only after there were no more women.

In 1907, Ismay met Lord Pirrie of the Harland & Wolff shipyard to discuss White Star's answer to the RMS Lusitania and RMS Mauretania, (Note: The duo themselves were designed to compete with the SS Kaiser Wilhelm der Grosse and SS Deutschland, owned respectively by the Norddeutscher Lloyd and the Hamburg America Line, the two top German shipping companies.) the recently unveiled marvels of their chief competitor, Cunard Line. Ismay's new type of ships would not be as fast as their competitors, but it would have huge steerage capacity and luxury unparalleled in the history of ocean-going steamships. The latter feature was largely meant to attract the wealthy and the prosperous middle class. Three ships of the Olympic class were planned and built. They were in order RMS Olympic, RMS Titanic and HMHS Britannic.

Ismay occasionally accompanied his ships on their maiden voyages, and this was the case with that of the Titanic. Ismay boarded in Southampton. During the voyage, Ismay talked with either (or possibly both) chief engineer Joseph Bell or Captain Edward J. Smith about a possible test of speed if time permitted. After the ship collided with an iceberg 370 miles south-southeast of Newfoundland on the night of 14 April 1912, it became clear that it would sink long before any rescue ships could arrive. Ismay stepped aboard Collapsible C, which was launched less than 20 minutes before the ship went down. He later testified that as the ship was in her final moments, he turned away, unable to watch. Collapsible C was picked up by the Carpathia about 3–4 hours later.

After being picked up by Carpathia, Ismay was led to the cabin belonging to the ship's doctor, Frank Mcgee. He gave Captain Rostron a message to send to White Star's New York office:

"Deeply regret advise you Titanic sank this morning fifteenth after collision iceberg, resulting serious loss life further particulars later". Bruce Ismay.

Ismay did not leave McGee's cabin for the entire journey, ate nothing solid, and was kept under the influence of opiates. Another survivor, 17-year-old Jack Thayer, visited Ismay to try to console him, despite having just lost his father in the sinking.

[Ismay] was staring straight ahead, shaking like a leaf. Even when I spoke to him, he paid absolutely no attention. I have never seen a man so completely wrecked.

When he arrived in New York, Ismay was hosted by Philip Franklin, vice president of the company. He was summoned by and testified before a Senate committee hearing headed by Republican Senator William Alden Smith the day after the arrival of Carpathia to New York. Ismay was the first witness to testify. A few weeks later, Ismay also testified at the British Board of Trade inquiry (chaired by Lord Mersey).

== Criticism and controversy ==
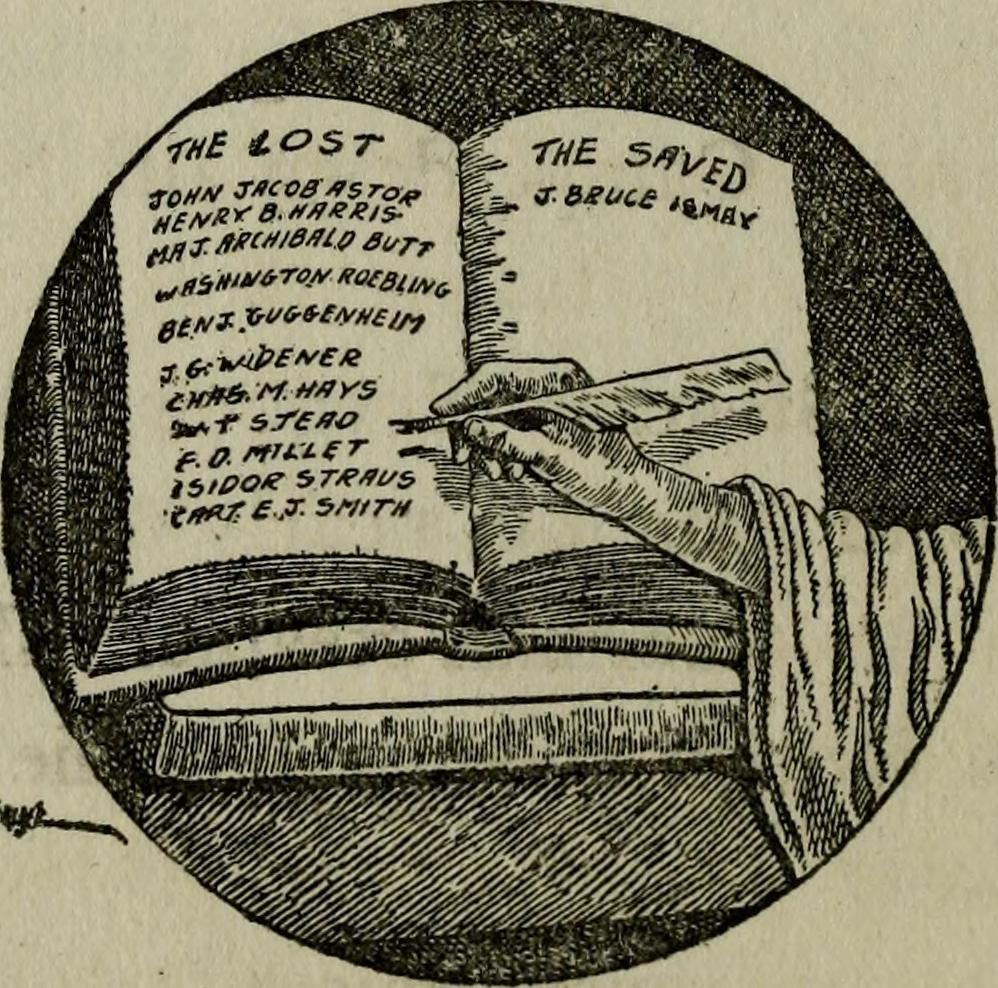
Drawing from the 1912 book Wreck and sinking of the Titanic criticising Ismay by comparing his survival to a list of notable individuals who perished with Titanic

After the disaster, Ismay was savaged by both the American and the British press for deserting the ship while women and children were still on board. Some papers called him the "Coward of the Titanic " or "J. Brute Ismay", and suggested that the White Star flag be changed to a yellow livery. Some ran negative cartoons depicting him deserting the ship. The writer Ben Hecht, then a young newspaperman in Chicago, wrote a scathing poem contrasting the actions of Captain Smith and Ismay. The final verse reads: "To hold your place in the ghastly face / of death on the sea at night / is a seaman's job, but to flee with the mob / is an owner's noble right."

Some maintain Ismay followed the "women and children first" principle, having assisted many women and children himself. Ismay's actions were defended in the official British inquiry, which found "Mr. Ismay, after rendering assistance to many passengers, found 'C' collapsible, the last boat on the starboard side, actually being lowered. No other people were there at the time. There was room for him and he jumped in. Had he not jumped in he would merely have added one more life — namely, his own — to the number of those lost."

Ismay announced during the United States Inquiry that all the vessels of the International Mercantile Marine Company would be equipped with lifeboats in sufficient numbers for all passengers. Following the inquiry, Ismay and the surviving officers of the ship returned to England aboard RMS Adriatic.

During the congressional investigations, some passengers testified that during the voyage they heard Ismay pressuring Captain Smith to increase the speed of Titanic in order to arrive in New York ahead of schedule and generate some free press about the new liner. The book The White Star Line: An Illustrated History (2000) by Paul Louden-Brown states that this was unlikely, and that Ismay's record does not support the notion that he had any motive to do so.

Ismay was widely vilified in the United States after the sinking of Titanic due to the hostility shown in the yellow press controlled by William Randolph Hearst, who had fallen out with Ismay.

Lord Mersey, who led the 1912 British inquiry into the sinking of Titanic, concluded that Ismay had helped many other passengers before finding a place for himself on the last lifeboat to leave the starboard side. On 30 June 1913, Ismay resigned as president of International Mercantile Marine and chairman of the White Star Line, to be succeeded by Harold Sanderson.

== Later life and death ==
Though cleared of blame by the official British inquiry, Ismay never recovered from the Titanic disaster. Already emotionally repressed and insecure before his voyage on Titanic, the tragedy sent him into a state of deep depression from which he never truly emerged. He kept a low profile afterwards. He lived part of the year in a large cottage, Costelloe Lodge, in the townland of Derrynea (near Casla) in Connemara, County Galway, Ireland which he bought from Henry Rudolph Laing of Cadogan Gardens, London, in January 1913, less than a year after the sinking. The purchase also included the fishing rights for the river and lake adjoining it. Paul Louden-Brown, in his history of the White Star Line, writes that Ismay continued to be active in business, and that much of his work was for the Liverpool & London Steamship Protection & Indemnity Association Limited, an insurance company founded by his father. According to Louden-Brown:

Hundreds of thousands of pounds were paid out in insurance claims to the relatives of Titanic's victims; the misery created by the disaster and its aftermath dealt with by Ismay and his directors with great fortitude, this, despite the fact that he could easily have shirked his responsibilities and resigned from the board. He stuck with the difficult task and during his twenty-five-year chairmanship hardly a page of the company's minutes does not contain some mention of the Titanic disaster.

Ismay maintained an interest in maritime affairs. He inaugurated a cadet ship called Mersey used to train officers for Britain's Merchant Navy, donated £11,000 to start a fund for lost seamen, and in 1919 gave £25,000 (approximately equivalent to £1.5 million in 2024) to set up a fund to recognise the contribution of merchant mariners in the First World War.

After the tragedy, Ismay's wife Florence ensured the subject of Titanic was never again discussed within the family. His granddaughter, historian and author Pauline Matarasso, likened her grandfather to a "corpse" in his later years:

Having had the misfortune (one might say the misjudgement) to survive – a fact he recognised despairingly within hours – he withdrew into a silence in which his wife made herself complicit – imposing it on the family circle and thus ensuring that the subject of the Titanic was as effectively frozen as the bodies recovered from the sea.

In his personal life, Ismay became a man of solitary habits, spending his summers at his Connemara cottage and indulging in a love of trout and salmon fishing. When in Liverpool, he would attend concerts by himself at St George's Hall or visit a cinema, at other times wandering through the Liverpool parks and engaging transients in conversation. A family friend observed that the spectre of Titanic was never far from Ismay's thoughts, saying that he continually "tormented himself with useless speculation as to how the disaster could possibly have been avoided." At a Christmas time family gathering in 1936, less than a year before Ismay's death, one of his grandsons by his daughter Evelyn, who had learned Ismay had been involved in maritime shipping, enquired if his grandfather had ever been shipwrecked. Ismay finally broke his quarter-century silence on the tragedy that had blighted his life, replying: "Yes, I was once in a ship which was believed to be unsinkable."

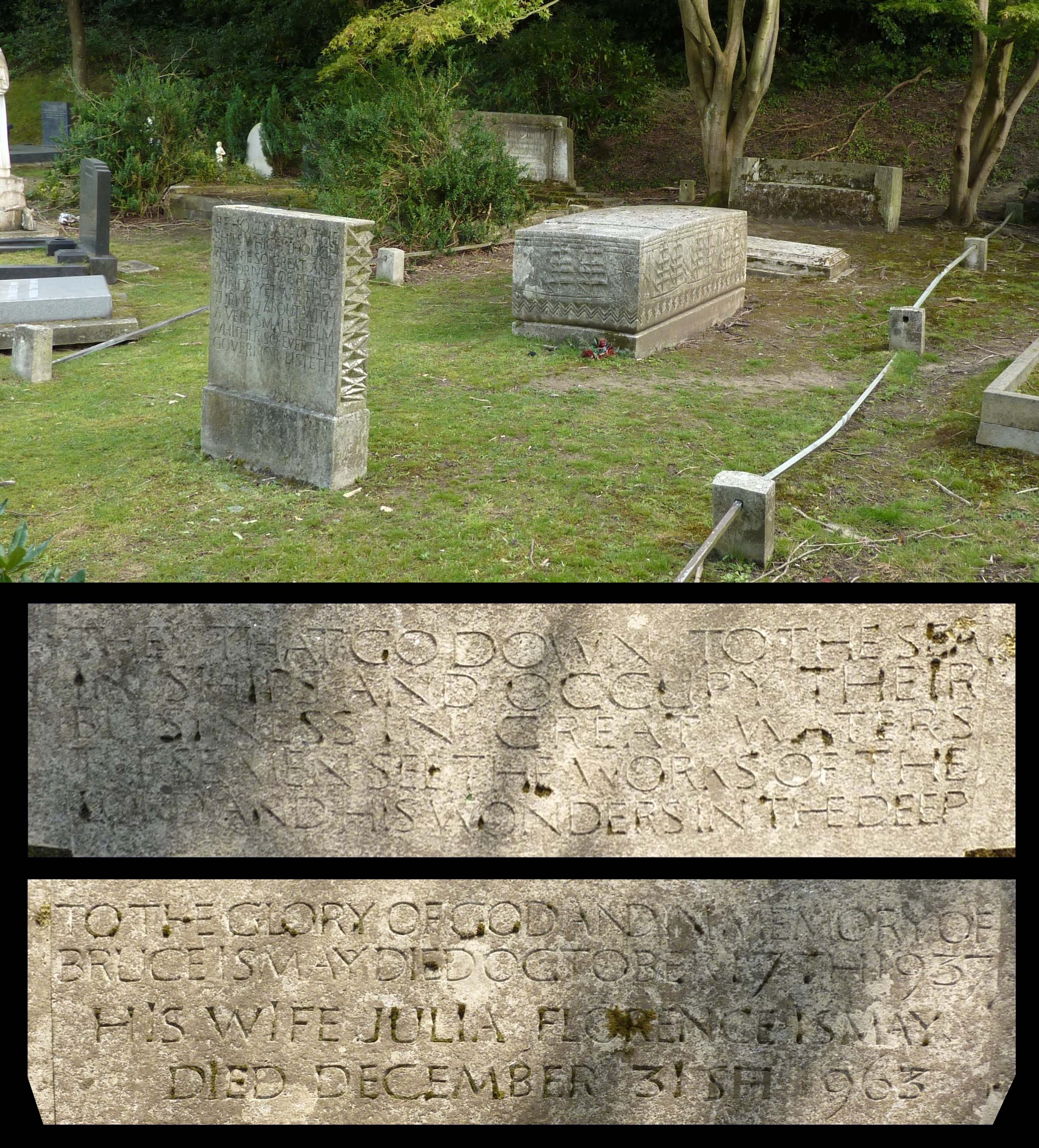
Ismay's family grave at Putney Vale Cemetery, London (2014) Gravestone inscriptions: They that go down to the sea in ships and occupy their business in great waters These men see the works of the Lord and His wonders in the deep To the glory of God and in memory of Bruce Ismay died October 17, 1937 his wife Julia Florence Ismay died December 31, 1963

Ismay's health declined in the 1930s, following a diagnosis of diabetes, which worsened in early 1936 when the illness resulted in the amputation of his right leg below the knee. He subsequently usually used a wheelchair. On the morning of 14 October 1937, he collapsed in his bedroom at his residence in Mayfair, London, after suffering a massive stroke, which left him unconscious, blind and mute. Three days later, on 17 October, Ismay died at the age of 74.

Ismay's funeral was held at St Paul's Church, Knightsbridge, on 21 October 1937, and he is buried in Putney Vale Cemetery, London. He left a very considerable personal estate, which, excluding property, was valued at £693,305 (approximately equivalent to £51 million in 2024). In March 1939, his wife Florence conveyed the property in Connemara unto their son George Bruce Ismay (including the fishery rights extending from the sea to the Lake of Glenicmurrin via the River Casla). After his death, Florence renounced her British subject status in order to restore her American citizenship on 14 November 1949.

Julia Florence Ismay, née Schieffelin, died 31 December 1963, aged 96, in Kensington, London.

== Portrayals ==
Following from the Hearst press depiction of Ismay, various subsequent films about Titanic have depicted Ismay either in an unfavorable light or almost as a villain, starting with the 1943 Nazi propaganda film Titanic where he is depicted as a corrupt British businessman who forces Captain Smith to sail Titanic recklessly at full speed into ice-infested waters in order to set a transatlantic speed record. A similar portrayal followed in the 1996 miniseries Titanic. Additionally, Julian Fellowes' 2012 miniseries Titanic depicts Ismay as a bigot who orders a group of non-British crew members locked below to drown during the sinking.

James Cameron's 1997 film Titanic depicts the inclusion of a scene based on the eyewitness account of First Class passenger Elizabeth Lines, who after the sinking stated in a deposition that she overheard Ismay urging Captain Smith to arrive in New York ahead of schedule in order to beat the transatlantic crossing time of Titanic's sister, RMS Olympic. Over the years, Lines's account has been questioned by historians, with some expressing doubt that it occurred because of the description of the men in question. Louden-Brown, one of several consultants to the Cameron film, has stated that he thought the antagonistic characterization of Ismay was unfair, and he tried to challenge this, but regardless of Louden-Brown's opinions, it was included in the film. Louden-Brown said, "Apart from being told, 'under no circumstances are we prepared to adjust the script', one thing they also said is 'this is what the public expect to see'."

- Ernst Fritz Fürbringer (1943) (Titanic)
- Lowell Gilmore (1955) (You Are There: The Sinking of the Titanic) (TV episode, 22 May 1955)
- Frank Lawton (1958) (A Night to Remember)
- Ian Holm (1979) (S.O.S. Titanic) (TV film)
- Sam Chew Jr. (1982) (Voyagers!) (Voyagers of the Titanic)
- Volkert Kraeft (1984) (Titanic - Nachspiel einer Katastrophe) (German TV film)
- Roger Rees (1996) (Titanic) (TV miniseries/2 parts)
- Jonathan Hyde (1997) (Titanic) (film)
- David Garrison (1997) (Titanic) (Broadway musical)
- Lou Slaughter (1998) (Titanic: Secrets Revealed) (TV documentary)
- Eric Braeden (1999) (The Titanic Chronicles) (TV documentary)
- David Haines (2006) (Titanic) (Broadway musical – Canadian premiere)
- Ken Marschall (2003) (Ghosts of the Abyss) (documentary)
- Christopher Wright (2005) (Titanic: Birth of a Legend) (TV documentary)
- Mark Tandy (2008) (The Unsinkable Titanic) (TV documentary)
- Christopher Villiers (2011) (Curiosity: What Sank Titanic?) (TV series)
- James Wilby (2012) (Titanic) (TV series/4 episodes)
- Gray O'Brien (2012) (Titanic: Blood and Steel) (TV series/8 episodes/Episodes 1, 4, 5 & 7–11)
- Julien Ball (2012) (Iceberg – Right Ahead!) (London stage play)
- Michael Maloney (2012) (Sherlock Holmes: The Adventure of the Perfidious Mariner) (audio play)
- Ben Bailey Smith (2016) - Drunk History (British TV series): Season 2: Episode 2: Scott of the Antarctic/Sinking of the Titanic
- Tom Metcalf (2017) - (Titanic: Sinking the Myths) (documentary)
- Derek Mahon ("After the Titanic") (poem)
- Sam Turich (2024) (Unsinkable) (film)
- Patrick Buchanan (2025) (Titanic Sinks Tonight) (TV documentary)

== See also ==
- Passengers of the RMS Titanic
