= Listed buildings in Neston =

Neston is a civil parish in Cheshire West and Chester, England. It contains 76 buildings that are recorded in the National Heritage List for England as designated listed buildings. Of these, five are listed at Grade II*, the middle grade, and the others are at Grade II. In addition to the village of Neston, it contains the settlements of Parkgate, Little Neston, and Ness. Outside the villages, the parish is rural. Most of the listed buildings are houses, or related to farming. The other listed buildings include churches and associated structures, a public house, a converted windmill, a former school and its chapel, a bridge over a disused railway, a war memorial, and a telephone kiosk.

== Key ==
Grade	Criteria
II*	Particularly important buildings of more than special interest.
II	Buildings of national importance and special interest.

== Buildings ==
Name and location	Photograph	Date	Notes	Grade
St Mary's and St Helen's Church; 53.2892°N 3.0643°W		14th century	The body of the church was largely rebuilt in 1875, re-using some 12th-century fabric. It is constructed in sandstone with slate roofs, and is in Early English style. The church consists of a nave with a clerestory, aisles, a chancel with a north vestry, and a west tower, which is battlemented.	II*
Hawthorne Cottage; 53.2835°N 3.0516°W	—	17th century	The cottage, which has had later alterations and additions, is in sandstone with a slate roof, and has a painted brick extension. It is in a single storey, and has a four-bay front. Most of the windows are casements with some sliding sash windows at the rear.	II
Goldstraw Farmhouse; 53.2758°N 3.0484°W		17th century	This originated as Ness Manor, subsequently a farmhouse. It is built in brick on a stone plinth with a roof of concrete tiles. The house is in two storeys and an attic, with a two-bay gabled front. The windows are sashes. The attached farm building is in sandstone and brick with a slate roof. It is also in two storeys, and has small windows with heavy stone lintels.	II
The Rocklands; 53.2828°N 3.0524°W	—	17th century	This was originally a farm building and a farmhouse, which were later converted into a single dwelling. The stone farm building dates from the 17th century and the brick farmhouse from the middle of the 18th century. The roofs are slated. The former farmhouse has two storeys and a three-bay front, with a central single-storey gabled porch. A single-storey extension connects this to the former farm building. The windows are sashes.	II
Farm building, Leighton Hall; 53.3064°N 3.0727°W	—	1665	This possibly originated as a combined farmhouse and farm building. It is built in brick on a sandstone plinth with sandstone dressings and a slate roof. On the roof are stone copings and ball and pedestal finials. It has two storeys and is in five bays. The windows are mullioned, and there are ventilation slits in the shape of crosses.	II
The Barn; 53.2909°N 3.0647°W		Late 17th century	This originated as a farm building, it was altered in the 19th century and used as a store. It stands on sandstone bedrock, and is constructed in sandstone, with a slate roof. It is in a single storey and has three bays. The windows are blocked.	II
Pengwern; 53.2996°N 3.0872°W		Late 17th or early 18th century	The house is in stuccoed brick with slate roofs. The main part has three storeys and two bays, with a two-storey, single-bay extension to right. The windows are sashes. The garden is enclosed on three sides by a sandstone wall with a steep coping; the wall is included in the listing.	II
Old Bank House; 53.2899°N 3.0650°W		1702	This originated as a town house, later converted into two shops and a flat. It is roughcast with a slate roof, it has two storeys with attics, and is in four bays. In the ground floor are shop fronts. The windows in the upper floor are sashes, and in the attic are two gabled dormers. To the left is a sandstone arched gateway, which is included in the listing.	II
Elmhurst; 53.2906°N 3.0686°W		1717	This was built as a house and later used as a nursing home. It was altered and extended in the early 20th century by W. Aubrey Thomas. The building is in brick with a slate roof. It is in two storeys with an attic. The windows are sashes. In the attic are three-light half-dormers.	II
Greenland Fishery Hotel; 53.2898°N 3.0651°W		c. 1722	This building originated as three houses. By 1822 two houses had been converted into two separate inns, and in 1892 these were joined as one inn. The three buildings were combined into a hotel in 1990. They are built in roughcast brick with stone dressings and have Welsh slate roofs. The building is in two storeys with attics.	II
Laburnum Farmhouse; 53.2767°N 3.0477°W		Early 18th century	The farmhouse was altered in the 20th century. It is built in brick with a slate roof. The house is in two storeys, and has a four-bay front. The windows were inserted in the 20th century. Included in the listing are the sandstone garden walls.	II
Leighton House; 53.3055°N 3.0717°W	—	Early 18th century	The country house is on the site of the Anglo Saxon village of Lestone, as listed in the Domesday Book of 1086 (reference). The house and outbuildings was built between 1620 and 1640. It was divided into 2 dwellings in around 1980 with extensions. It is built in rendered brick and sandstone on a stone plinth and has a slate roof. The main house has 3 stories and a cellar, the rear section having 2 stories. It has an entrance front of five bays, plus a three-bay extension. The windows are a mix of sashes and casements.	II
Moorside House; 53.2907°N 3.0698°W		Early 18th century	The house is in brick on a stone plinth with stone dressings and a slate roof. It has a double-range plan, is in three storeys, and has a four-bay front. Four steps lead up to the doorway, which has a shell canopy. The windows are sashes with wedge lintels. At the top of the house is a cornice and a plain parapet. The wrought iron railings are included in the listing.	II*
Nelson Cottage and Dover Cottage; 53.2929°N 3.0807°W		Early 18th century	A pair of houses, later altered. They are in roughcast brick with slate roofs. The houses have three storeys, and each house has a two-bay front. Nelson Cottage has a canted bay window and a pointed oriel window. The other windows are sashes.	II
Prospect House; 53.2932°N 3.0813°W		Early 18th century	A roughcast brick house with a slate roof and stone copings. It has three storeys and a two-bay front, with five steps leading up to the entrance. The door has a fanlight in a round-headed doorcase with a vermiculated keystone. This is flanked by full-height canted bays containing sash windows.	II
Seven Steps, Butcher's Shop and Teal Cottage, Parkgate; 53.2957°N 3.0835°W		Early 18th century	A terrace of three pebbledashed houses, built in red brick, possibly with stone dressings. The roofs are slated at the front, and tiled at the back. The houses have three storeys and cellars, gabled half-dormers, and each house is approached by a flight of steps. The butcher's shop has 2½ bays; the other two houses have a single bay. The windows are sashes. Seven Steps contains wall paintings.	II*
26 and 28 The Green, Little Neston; 53.2840°N 3.0511°W	Neston_-_26_And_28,_The_Green_-_20210331103249	1731	Originating as a house, it was later converted into two dwellings. The building is in roughcast stone with slate roofs and stone-coped gables. It has two storeys and a three-bay front. In the centre is a timber half-glazed porch flanked by canted bay windows. The windows are sashes.	II
The White House; 53.2836°N 3.0524°W	—	1732	This was originally a farmhouse, and has been altered. It is built in sandstone and has an extension in painted brick. The roofs are slated with terracotta ridges. The original part is in two storeys with an attic, and has a two-bay front; the extension has two storeys and one bay. The windows in the original part of sliding sashes, and in the extension they are casements. Inside the house is an inglenook.	II
Gittins Building; 53.28991°N 3.06532°W		1744	This originated as a house. It was altered in the 20th century and used as a restaurant. The building is in brick with a slate roof. It has two storeys and an attic, with a one-bay gabled front facing the road. The windows in the lower storeys are sashes, and in the attic is a casement window.	II
Outbuildings, Vine House; 53.2904°N 3.0663°W	—	1747	The outbuildings originated as a stable block. They are in brick with a slate roof, and consist of a single storey with a loft, the building extending for six bays. It contains three wide openings, windows of various types, two circular pitch holes, and five rows of dove holes.	II
Ashfield farmhouse and farm building 53.3073°N 3.0575°W	—	Mid 18th century	The farmhouse is in brick on a stone plinth, with a rendered front, a roughcast rear, and a slate roof. It has two storeys, a basement and an attic, and a four-bay front. The windows are sashes. The attached farm building is in brick with an asbestos cement steel roof. It is in a single storey with a loft, and extends for four bays. Its features include round pitch holes, and ventilators in a diamond pattern.	II
Barnoon; 53.29297°N 3.08086°W		Mid 18th century	A house that was later altered. It is built in rendered brick on a stone plinth with painted window surrounds and dressings, and a slate roof with stone copings. The house has three storeys and a two-bay front. The windows are sashes.	II
Church House Chambers; 53.2892°N 3.0630°W		Mid 18th century	This was built as a town house, and converted later for use as a shop and offices. It is built in brick and has a slate roof. The building is in three storeys and has a three-bay front. It has an inserted shop front, the other windows being sashes. At the top of the building is a cornice and a plain parapet. At the sides are piers, one containing a sundial, the other a panel.	II
Elm Grove House; 53.2906°N 3.0688°W		Mid 18th century	This originated as a town house; it was later altered and converted into a hotel. The building is roughcast with a slate roof. It has two storeys and an attic, and extends for four bays. There are pilasters on the angles, and the windows are sashes.	II
Maplewood; 53.29697°N 3.08458°W		Mid 18th century	A roughcast house with painted window surrounds and quoins, and a concrete tile roof. It has two storeys, a two-bay front, and a gabled porch. One window is mullioned and transomed; all windows contain casements.	II
Overdee and Grey Walls; 53.2969°N 3.0847°W		Mid 18th century	Originating as a single house, the building has been converted into two dwellings. It is built in roughcast brick with painted window surrounds and quoins, and has a slate roof with stone copings. The building has two storeys and attics, with three bays on the street front, two bays on the right side, and a two-storey two-bay extension beyond. The attics have casement windows in gabled dormers; the windows elsewhere are sashes.	II
South Cottage; 53.29446°N 3.08226°W		Mid 18th century	A small house in roughcast brick on a stone plinth with painted dressings and a slate roof with coped gables. It has three storeys and a single-bay front, with two bays on the right side. Most of the windows are casements.	II
Spring Vale; 53.2893°N 3.0739°W	Spring Vale Neston	Mid 18th century	The house was subsequently extended and altered. It is built in brick on a stone plinth with a slate roof. The house has two storeys plus and attic, the gable end facing the road. On the right of this face is a polygonal bay window with a hipped roof. The windows are sashes. On the right side are two gabled dormers containing sliding sash windows.	II
Talbot House; 53.2931°N 3.0812°W		Mid 18th century	The house incorporates an earlier rear wing and has subsequently been altered. It is in roughcast brick on a stone plinth, and has an L-shaped plan. The house is in two storeys with four bays facing the road, and the doorway on the right side. The windows are sashes, and there is a single dormer.	II
Vine House; 53.2902°N 3.0664°W		Mid 18th century	A brick house on a plinth with painted stone dressings and a slate roof. It has two storeys and an attic, and a four-bay front. At the corners are pilaster strips, and the windows are sashes. Between the windows in the attic is a sundial.	II
Windmill; 53.29405°N 3.06771°W	—	Mid 18th century	The former windmill has been converted into commercial use. It is built in brick, and has a circular plan. The building consists of a four-stage tapering tower with a boat-shaped slate cap. The entrance is on the first floor. There are two two-light casement windows on each floor.	II
14 Station Road, Parkgate; 53.29298°N 3.08057°W		18th century	A house that was altered in the 19th century. It is built in stuccoed brick with a slate roof. The house has three storeys and a two-bay front. The windows are sashes.	II
16–19 The Parade, Parkgate; 53.2944°N 3.0821°W		18th century	Originating as three houses, later converted into shops and flats. The building is in roughcast brick with painted window surrounds, and a slate roof with coped gables. It is in two storeys with attics. The ground floor contains three shop windows. Above are sash windows, those in the attics in gabled half-dormers.	II
Garden walls, Vine House; 53.29027°N 3.06613°W	—	18th century	The walls on the north and west sides of the garden are built in brick. It is a crinkle-crankle type of wall, which is rare in Cheshire; it consists of concave bays with straight lengths of wall between them.	II
Holly Tree House; 53.2895°N 3.0661°W		18th century	The house is stuccoed with a slate roof. It has three storeys and a two-bay front, which is flanked by single-storey screen walls with ball finials. The windows on the ground and first floors are sashes; those in the top floor are casements.	II
Newstead House; 53.2863°N 3.0609°W		1760s	The house, which was later altered, is built in roughcast brick, with painted stone dressings, and has a roof of concrete tiles. The house has a square plan, is in two storeys with a basement, and has a front of three bays. It is in Georgian style, having sash windows with wedge lintels.	II
Banastre Cottage; 53.2972°N 3.0831°W	—	Late 18th century	The middle house in a row of three, designed by George Cripps. It is built in brick, partly rendered, with a slate roof. It is a two-storey building in three bays, incorporating a taller two-bay building on the left. Both sections contain canted bay windows, those in the lower part in two storeys with casement windows and, in the taller section, in one storey with pilasters and sash windows.	II
Balcony House; 53.2946°N 3.0823°W		Late 18th century	This originated as a house, it was later used as assembly rooms, then converted into three houses. An elaborate cast iron balcony was added to the first floor in 1865. The house is in rendered brick, and has slate roofs with coped gables. The main part is in three storeys, and has a five-bay front. Two flights of nine steps with iron railings lead up to the entrances. All the windows are sashes. To the rear on the left side is a two-storey three-bay extension.	II
Brockleigh; 53.2971°N 3.0828°W	—	Late 18th century	The house was extended in the early 19th century. It is built in brick with a slate roof, and has two storeys. The original part is in three bays, with a single-bay extension to the right. The doorway has a round-arched doorcase and a fanlight. The windows are sashes.	II
Cherry Farmhouse; 53.3040°N 3.0435°W		Late 18th century	The farmhouse has subsequently been altered and extended. It is built in sandstone with a slate roof and stone copings. The farmhouse has two storeys, a three-bay front, and a single-storey porch. The windows are sashes.	II
Leighton Banastre; 53.2974°N 3.0831°W	—	Late 18th century	A house in a row of three, designed by George Cripps. It is built in brick with a slate roof, and has an L-shaped plan. The house is in two storeys, with a main front of three bays, and a taller single-bay extension on the right. The windows are sashes. On the left side is a two-storey canted bay window and two French windows.	II
Moor End; 53.2896°N 3.0736°W	Moor End Neston	Late 18th century	Originally a farmhouse, it was later altered. It is built in roughcast brick on a stone plinth with stucco dressings and a slate roof. The house is in three storeys, with a two-bay front. The right bay contains a two-storey canted bay window. The windows are sashes.	II
Mostyn Cottage; 53.2968°N 3.0829°W	Neston_-_Mostyn_Cottage_-_20201220144348	Late 18th century	The cottage is built in roughcast brick with a slate roof. It is in two storeys, and has a three-bay front. The windows are sashes.	II
Sawyer's Cottage; 53.2997°N 3.0873°W		Late 18th century	The house has subsequently been altered and remodelled. It is roughcast with a Welsh slate roof. The house has two storeys with attics, and has a two-bay front. The windows are a mix of sashes and casements.	II
Sea View; 53.2902°N 3.0666°W	—	Late 18th century	A brick house with a slate roof, later altered. It has three storeys, and a two-bay front. The windows are sashes.	II
Sundial; 53.28899°N 3.06452°W		1777	The sundial is in the churchyard of St Mary's and St Helen's Church. It consists of a vase-baluster on a square base inscribed with the names of churchwardens and the date. The cap is separate and the dial and gnomon are missing.	II
13 Station Road, Parkgate; 53.29299°N 3.08050°W		Early 19th century	The cottage was altered in the 20th century. It is stuccoed, and has a slate roof. The cottage is in two storeys, and has a narrow, single-bay front.	II
Lloyd's Cottages; 53.2762°N 3.0483°W	Neston_-_Lloyds_Cottages_-_20210331101819	Early 19th century	A row of three sandstone cottages with slate roofs. They are in two storeys, and each cottage has a single bay, the end cottages projecting forward. The windows are sashes.	II
The Hermitage; 53.2891°N 3.0664°W	—	Early 19th century	A villa in roughcast brick with a hipped slate roof. It consists of a ground floor and a half-basement, and has fronts of three bays. The windows are sashes. At the rear is a verandah.	II
Yew Tree House; 53.3098°N 3.0519°W	—	Early 19th century	The house is built in brick with a pyramidal roof of slates and tiles. It has two storeys and a semi-basement, and a three-bay front. Eight steps lead up to a doorway with a porch of fluted columns and a dentilled cornice hood. The windows are sashes.	II
Glenton House; 53.2821°N 3.0534°W	—	Early to mid 19th century	A sandstone house with a slate roof and a terracotta ridge. It has two storeys, and a three-bay front. There is a central porch flanked by Tuscan columns, and with an entablature. The windows are sashes.	II
Presbytery, St Winifrede's Church; 53.28504°N 3.05920°W	—	1840	Originally built as a schoolmaster's house, it was designed by A. W. N. Pugin, and later enlarged to become the presbytery. It is built in sandstone, partly pebbledashed, with slate roofs. The building is in one storey with an attic, and has a front of three bays. The porch projects under a gable and, on the left, is a two-storey, single-bay extension. Other than one lancet window, the windows are casements with stone mullions.	II
St Thomas' Church, Parkgate; 53.2962°N 3.0832°W		1843	This was built as a Congregational chapel, then sold to the Presbyterian church, and finally became an Anglican church. It is built in sandstone with a slate roof. It has a rectangular plan with a five-bay continuous nave and chancel and lancet windows.	II
Beech House; 53.2905°N 3.0681°W	Neston_-_Beech_House_-_20201220141605	1847	The house is roughcast with a slate roof. It has two storeys, and a right-angled entrance front of three bays, with a single-storey flat-roofed porch in the angle. Elsewhere are single-storey canted bay windows. The other windows are sashes.	II
1–6 Victoria Road, Little Neston; 53.2836°N 3.0520°W	Neston_-_1-6,_Victoria_Road_-_20210331102517	Mid 19th century	A row of three sandstone semi-detached houses. Nos. 5 and 6 have slate roofs; the others have concrete tiles. The houses have two storeys and single-bay fronts. The windows are sashes.	II
20 The Green, Little Neston; 53.2839°N 3.0518°W	Neston_-_20,_The_Green_-_20210331103216	Mid 19th century	Originating as a shop and a house, the building was later extended and converted into a house. It is in roughcast stone with a slate roof. It has two storeys, and consists of a main two-bay section and a single-bay extension. The windows are casements.	II
Backwood Hall, Parkgate; 53.3082°N 3.0859°W		Mid 19th century	A mansion built in red brick with slate roofs in Jacobean style. It is in two storeys with a basement, and extends for five bays, the three central bays projecting forward. The entrance is flanked by Tuscan columns, with an entablature, above which is a balustrade. The windows are sashes, above which are three shaped gables.	II
Springfield; 53.2891°N 3.0660°W	pic	Mid 19th century	The house is built in roughcast brick on a plinth, and has rusticated quoins and slate roofs. Around the ground floor main fronts is a glass-roofed verandah. The gables have bargeboards, some of which are decorated, and others are plain. The house has a roughly cruciform plan, and is in two storeys. The windows are sashes.	II
11 Station Road, Parkgate; 53.29301°N 3.08038°W		19th century	A cottage with earlier origins, and later alterations. It is built in roughcast brick on a rendered plinth with a slate roof. The cottage has two storeys, with the gable end facing the street, and the entrance on the left side.	II
12 Station Road, Parkgate; 53.29301°N 3.08046°W		19th century	A cottage with alterations in the 20th century. It is stuccoed with a slate roof. The cottage has two storeys, and us set back from the adjoining properties. The windows are casements.	II
Hope Cottages; 53.2838°N 3.0521°W		1853	Originally a row of six cottages, later two combined into one. They are built in sandstone with slate roofs. One cottage has one storey, the others have two; each has a two-bay front. They were modernised in the 20th century, with new windows and the addition of porches.	II
Mostyn House School; 53.2937°N 3.0816°W		1855	A former public school created from a hotel. Additional buildings were added later, and in 1932 the front of the school was faced with timber framing, giving it a black and white appearance. The school closed in 2010. The complex of buildings forms an irregular L-shape, in varying materials, size and type.	II
Hinderton Hall; 53.2982°N 3.0437°W		1856	The hall originated as a country house, and later used as offices and for corporate events. It was designed by Alfred Waterhouse, and extended in the 20th century. The hall is built in sandstone with a slate roof. The entrance front is in two storeys with attics, and has five bays, gabled cross-wings, and a tower. The windows are mainly mullioned and in pairs, with some in gabled half-dormers.	II
Lodge, Hinderton Hall; 53.29918°N 3.04682°W		c. 1856	The main lodge to the hall was designed by Alfred Waterhouse, and was altered in the 20th century. The lodge is built in sandstone with a slate roof, and has a cruciform plan. It is in a single storey, and has a three-bay entrance front. The middle bay projects forward under a gable, and the right bay contains a porch with a trefoil-headed entrance and a quatrefoil above. The other windows are mullioned and transomed.	II
Back Lodge; 53.29866°N 3.04086°W		c. 1856	This originated as a lodge to Hinderton Hall designed by Alfred Waterhouse, and later extended and used as a house. It is in sandstone with a slate roof. The house has an L-shaped plan, is in two storeys, and has a single-bay gabled font. On the front is single-storey canted bay window with a sash window, and another sash window above. The other windows are casements.	II
Quarry Lodge; 53.29578°N 3.03821°W		c. 1856	This originated as a lodge to Hinderton Hall designed by Alfred Waterhouse, and was later used as a house. It is in sandstone with a slate roof. The house has an L-shaped plan, is in two storeys, and has a single-bay gabled font. On the front is single-storey canted bay window with a sash window, and another sash window above. The other windows are casements.	II
Hearse house 53.28925°N 3.06471°W		c. 1875	The hearse house was probably designed by J. Francis Doyle. It is constructed in sandstone with a slate roof and tiled ridge. It is in a single storey on a high plinth, and extends for three bays. The entrance front is gabled; this front and the left side contain lancet windows.	II
Windle Hall; 53.2910°N 3.0329°W	—	Late 19th century	A house in sandstone with a slate roof and a blue tiled ridge. It is in two storeys, with a two-bay centre range flanked by gabled cross-wings. On the right side is a tower with a lancet window. The other windows are sashes.	II
Church Lane Bridge; 53.28773°N 3.06408°W		c. 1886	The bridge was built to carry the Parkgate branch of the Birkenhead, Lancs and Cheshire Junction Railway, now closed; over Church Lane. It now forms part of the footpath of the Wirral Way. It is built in engineering brick faced with sandstone. It consists of a single semicircular arch of voussoirs springing from imposts on abutments.	II
The Towers; 53.2945°N 3.0411°W	—	1890	A country house designed by William Pritchard. It is built in sandstone with a slate roof and red tiles on the ridge. The house has a complex plan, and is in two and three storeys. Its features include coped gables, steps leading up to the entrance porch, a turret with a crow-stepped crenellated parapet, oriel windows, and bay windows.	II
Chapel, Mostyn House School; 53.2936°N 3.0811°W	Neston_-_Chapel_Of_Mostyn_House_School_-_20201220143300	1895	The chapel was designed by Frederick Fraser and Warburton, with input by the headmaster of the school, A. G. Grenfell. It is built in red Ruabon brick with terracotta dressings, and has a red tiled roof with a finial at the east end. The chapel consists of a nave and chancel in a single range, an apsidal east end, and a west bellcote. The furnishings are in collegiate style, designed by Frederick Fraser. In the windows is painted glass made by Morton and Company of Liverpool.	II*
Jackson's Tower; 53.2899°N 3.0649°W		1895	This small shop and tower were built by a local trader. The building is in Accrington brick with terracotta decoration and a red tiled roof. The shop is in two storeys with a semicircular headed shop window in the ground floor. and a pair of round-headed sash windows above. The tower is in four stages, with a round-headed entrance in the ground floor. Both have a pair of round-headed sash windows above. In the third stage of the tower is an oculus on three sides. The top stage contains louvred windows, and at the summit is a pierced parapet with a pinnacle at each corner.	II
Manse; 53.2910°N 3.0710°W		1899	The manse was designed for the Presbyterian church by J. Middleton Shallcross. It is in roughcast brick on a stone plinth, with stone dressings and a hipped slate roof. The manse has two storeys and eight bays, with a buttress on one corner. The chimneys are tall with dentil cornices. The windows are sashes.	II
Brooke (or Brooke) House; 53.2994°N 3.0867°W	—	1904	A house designed by W. Aubrey Thomas for himself. It is in roughcast brick with stone dressings, a slate roof, and red tiles on the ridge. The south entrance front is in a single storey and an attic, and has three bays. The west front has two storeys and three bays. The end bays project forward, the left bay is square and the right semicircular. The windows are sashes.	II
War Memorial; 53.28940°N 3.06413°W		1920	The war memorial stands in an enclosed area in a corner of the churchyard of St Mary's and St Helen's Church overlooking the road. It is in sandstone and about 5 metres (16 ft) high. The memorial consists of a base of three square steps, a tapering plinth, and a wheel-head cross. The front is carved with a crown of thorns around the head, rosebuds on the arms of the cross, and on the shaft is intertwining foliage. On the plinth are inscriptions relating to both World War, and a plaque referring to the Falklands War.	II
Telephone kiosk, Ness; 53.27653°N 3.04832°W		1935	A K6 type telephone kiosk, designed by Giles Gilbert Scott. It is constructed in cast iron, with a square plan and domed roof. In the panels around the top are three unperforated crowns.	II

== See also ==
- Listed buildings in Gayton
- Listed buildings in Heswall
- Listed buildings in Raby
- Listed buildings in Thornton Hough
- Listed buildings in Willaston
