= Little Neston =

Village in Cheshire, England

Coordinates: 53.280°N 3.057°W

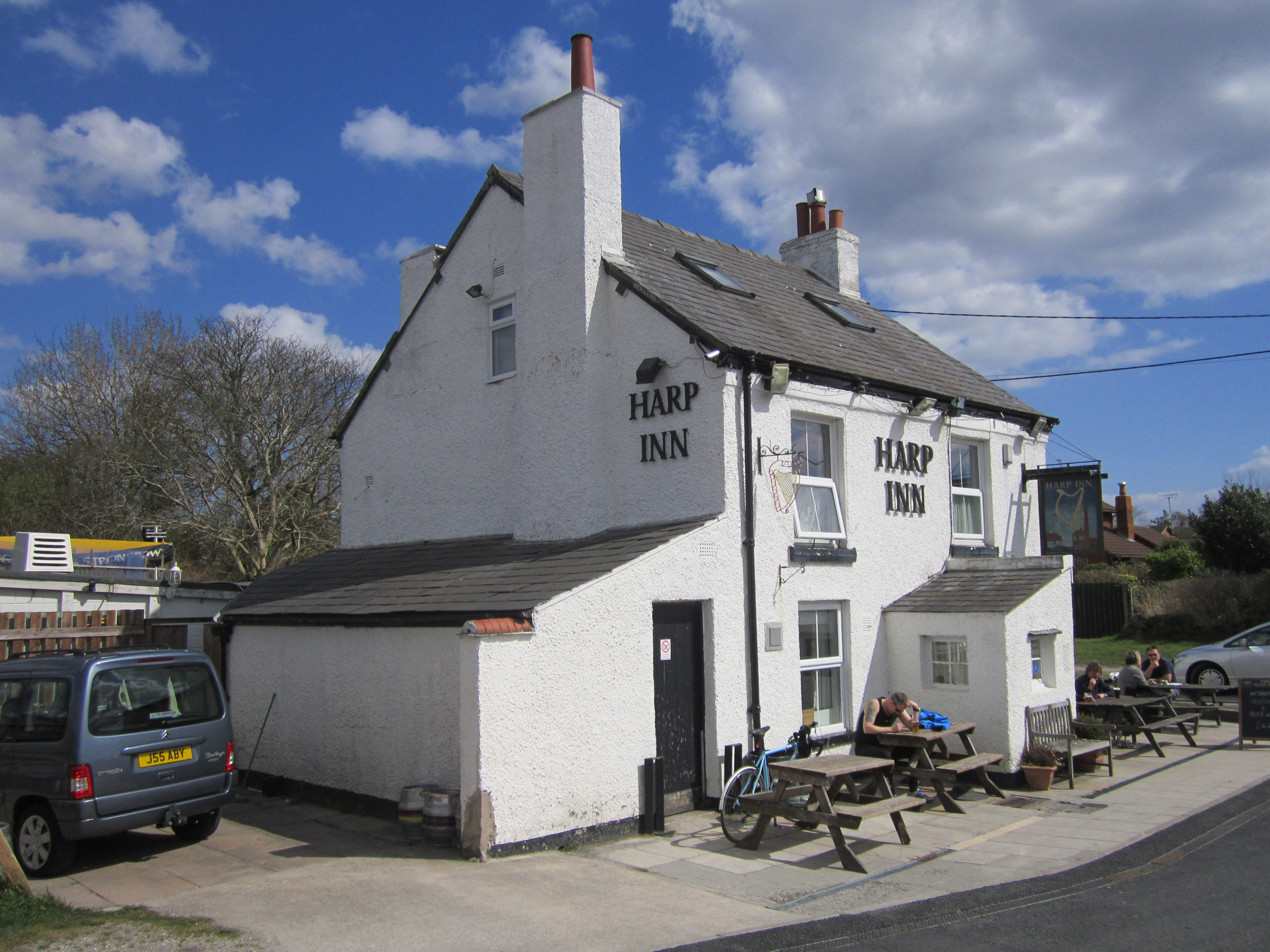
- Harp Inn, Little Neston

- Location within Cheshire
- Population: 3,390 (2001 Census)
- OS grid reference: SJ296764
- Civil parish: Neston
- Unitary authority: Cheshire West and Chester
- Ceremonial county: Cheshire
- Region: North West
- Country: England
- Sovereign state: United Kingdom
- Post town: NESTON
- Postcode district: CH64
- Dialling code: 0151
- Police: Cheshire
- Fire: Cheshire
- Ambulance: North West
- UK Parliament: Chester North and Neston

Little Neston is a village south of Neston and situated on the Wirral Peninsula, Cheshire, England. Little Neston is administratively part of Cheshire West and Chester and had a population of 3,390 at the 2001 Census.

View of the marsh, Little Neston

Together with Neston, it is a former mining village, with shafts dug out underneath the River Dee.

The marshes of the River Dee are popular with bird watchers and horticulturalists because of the wide range of flora and fauna to be found in the area.

Lord Nelson's mistress, Emma Hamilton, was born in nearby Ness and is remembered locally with the Lady Hamilton pub.

Little Neston is home to St Winifride's RC Primary School on Mellock Lane and Woodfall Primary School on Woodfall Lane. Neston Primary School on Burton Road is also in Little Neston. The nearest high school is Neston High School in Raby Park Road, Neston.

== History ==
The settlement was mentioned in the Domesday Book as Little Nestone.

Little Neston was formerly a township in the parish of Neston, in 1866 Little Neston became a separate civil parish, on 30 September 1894 the parish was abolished to form Neston cum Parkgate. In 1891 the parish had a population of 1012. From 1974 to 2009 it was in Ellesmere Port and Neston district.

== See also ==
- Listed buildings in Neston
