= Hinderton Hall =

Country house in Cheshire, England

Coordinates: 53.29826°N 3.04372°W

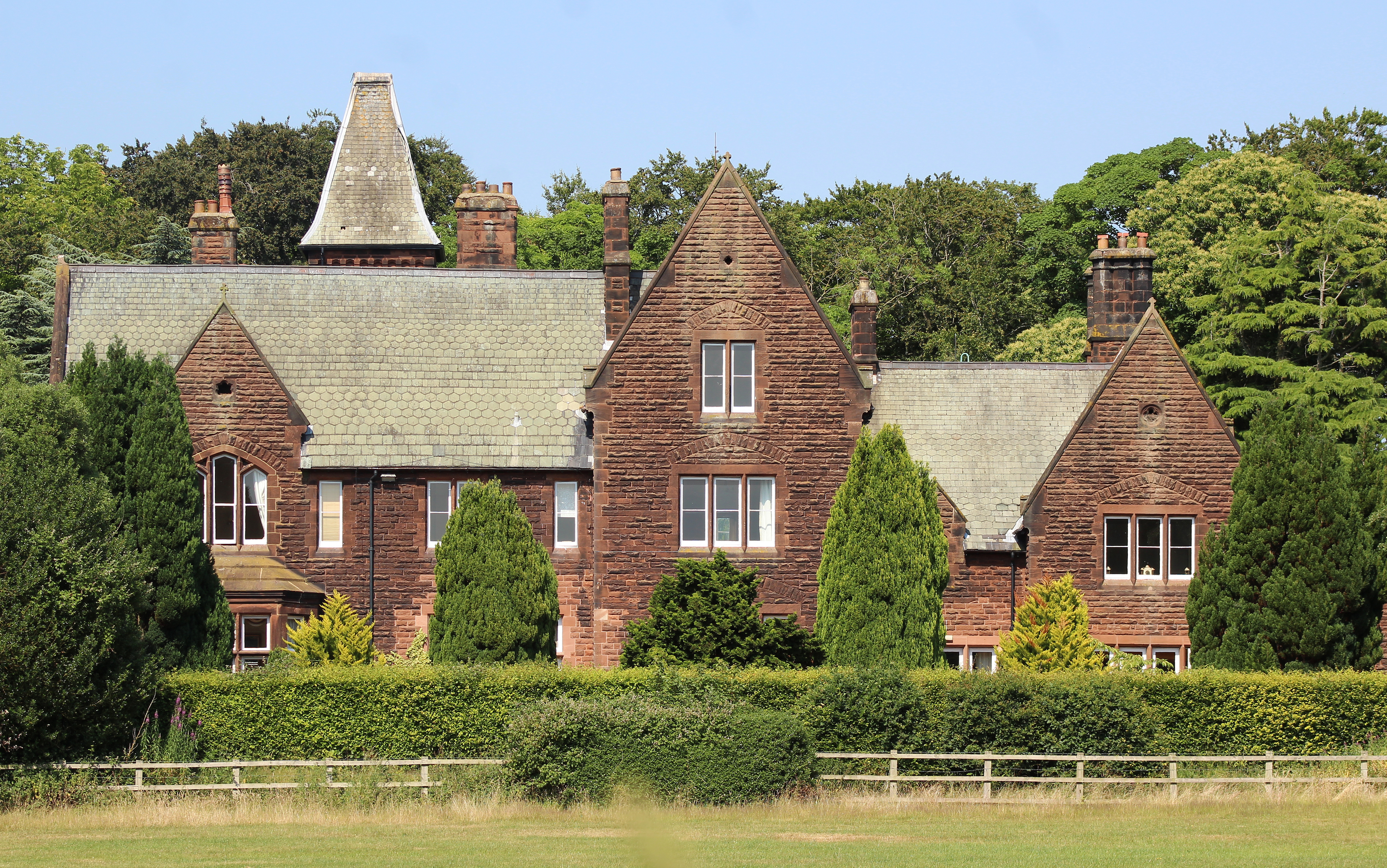
Hinderton Hall from Chester High Road

Hinderton Hall is a country house to the northeast of Neston, Cheshire, England.

== History ==
The house was built in 1856 for Christopher Bushell, a Liverpool wine merchant. The architect, who designed and oversaw the work on the Hall was Alfred Waterhouse. It was "an exceptionally early work", designed before his first major commission, the Manchester Assize Courts. Extensions to the house were built in the 20th century for Sir Percy Bates, chairman of the Cunard Line, and the estate now has cottages and a Chapter House. Over the years, the building and grounds had been used as offices, hosting weddings and corporate events. The house has since been a privately owned family home.

== Architecture ==
Hinderton Hall is constructed in coursed rock-faced sandstone, with ashlar quoins and dressings. Its plan is approximately square. The house has tall gables, and steep roofs in patterned slate. At the corner of the entrance front is a thin tower. Internally, the entrance hall contains the staircase, with the reception rooms grouped around it. Waterhouse designed three lodges and a stable block in a similar style. The house is recorded in the National Heritage List for England as a designated Grade II listed building, as is the estate’s entrance lodge and back cottage.

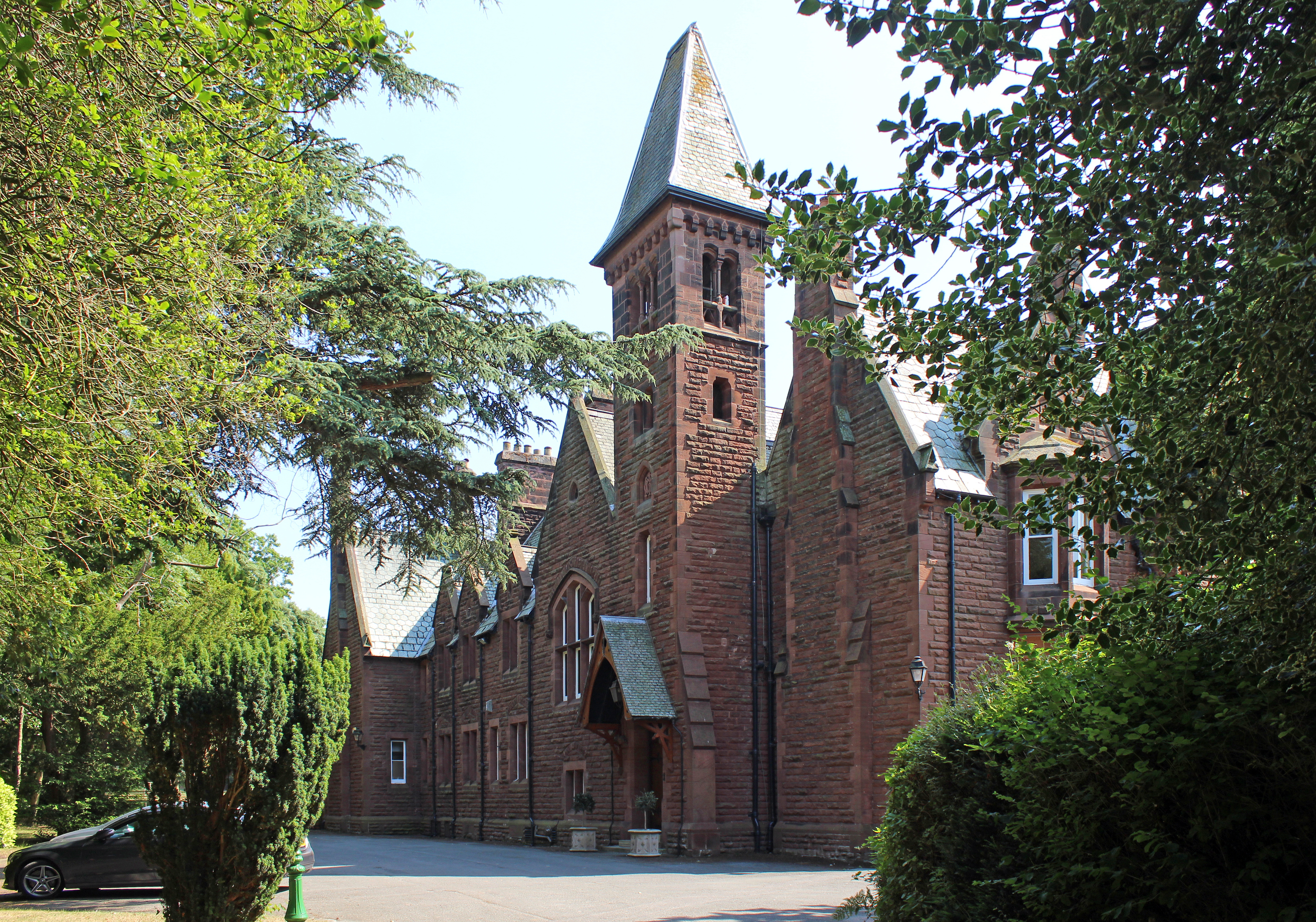
Hinderton Hall

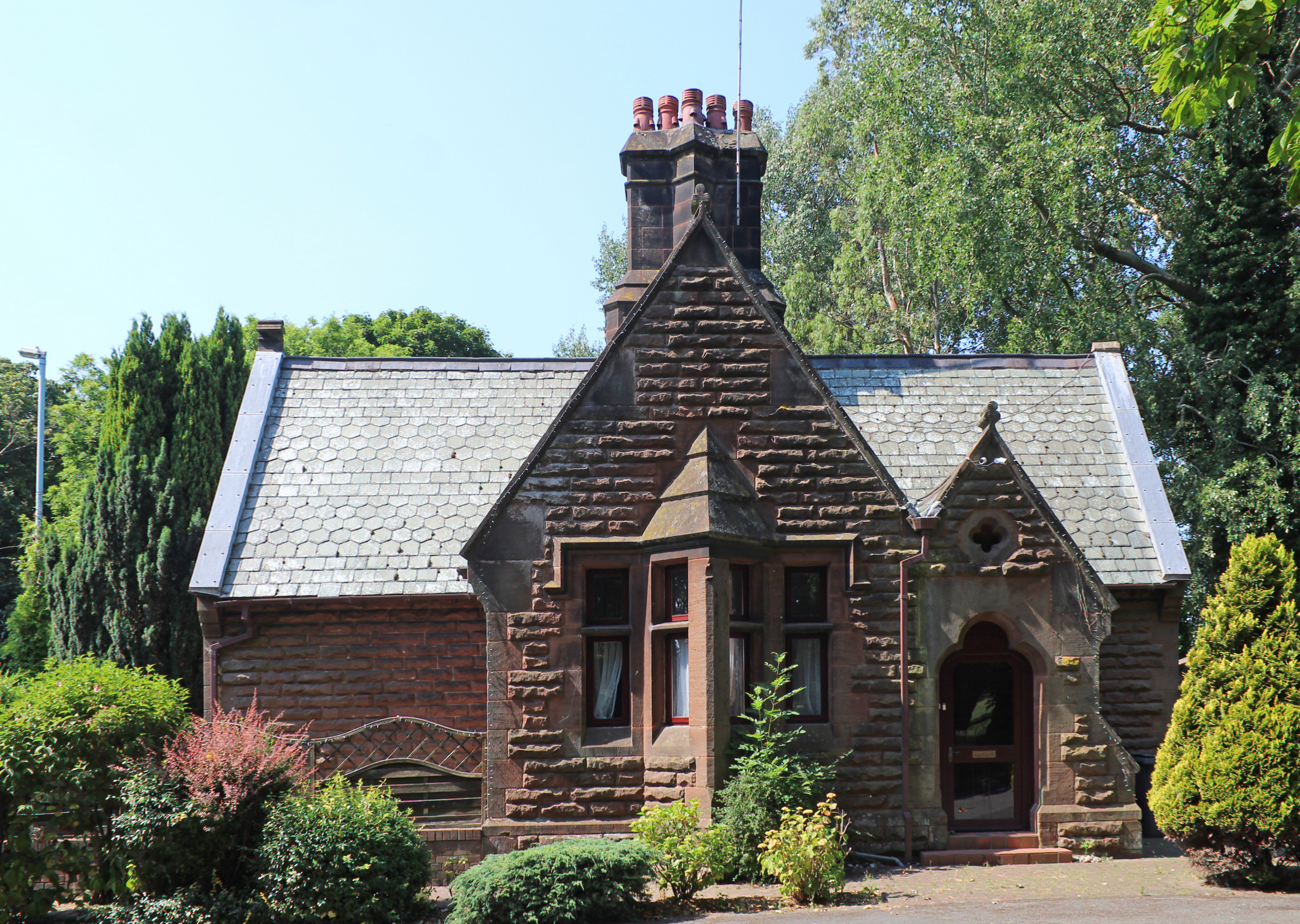
Hinderton Hall Lodge

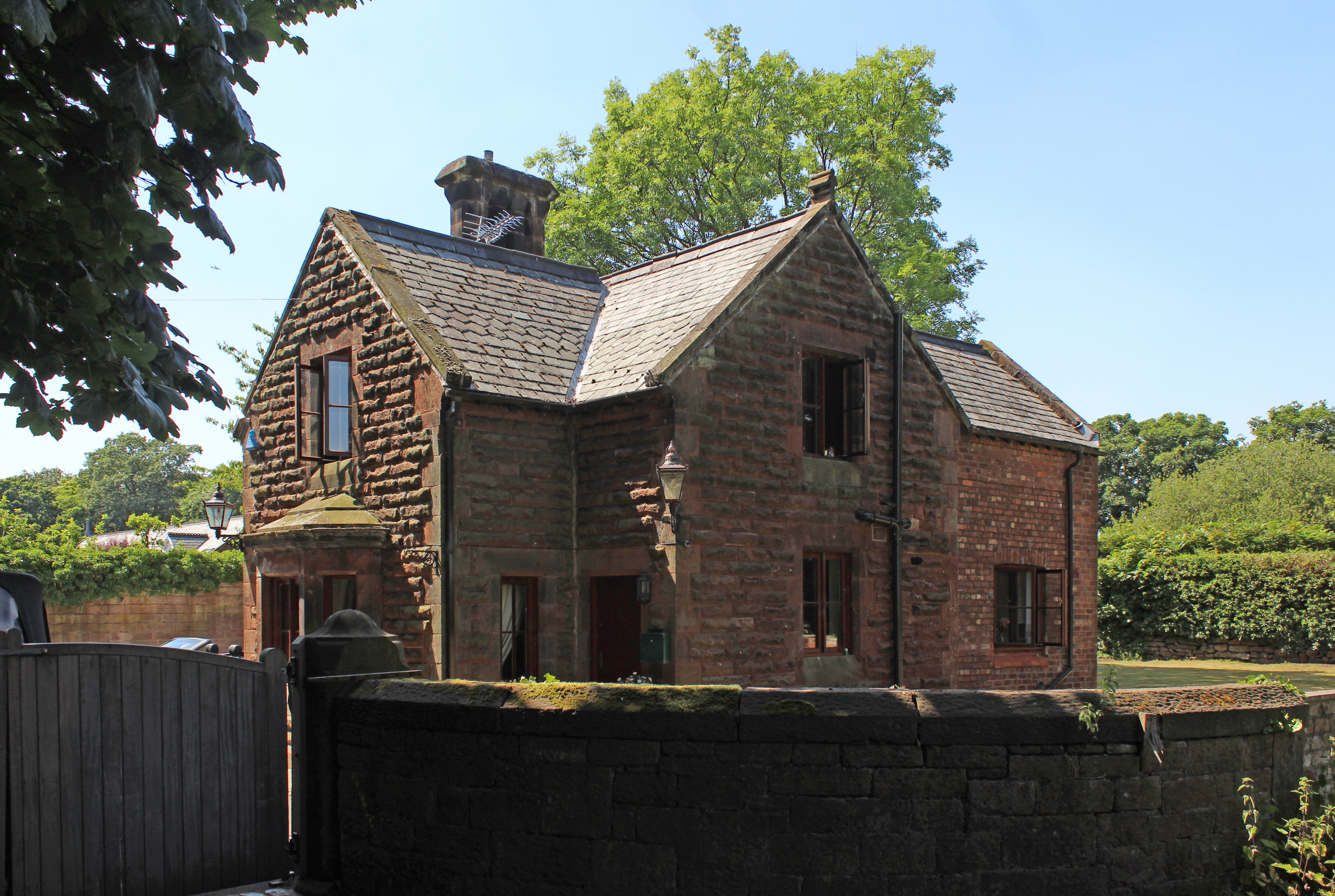
Hinderton Hall Cottage

== See also ==
- Listed buildings in Neston
