= Percy Bates =

English shipowner (1879–1946)

Sir Percy Bates Bt GBE
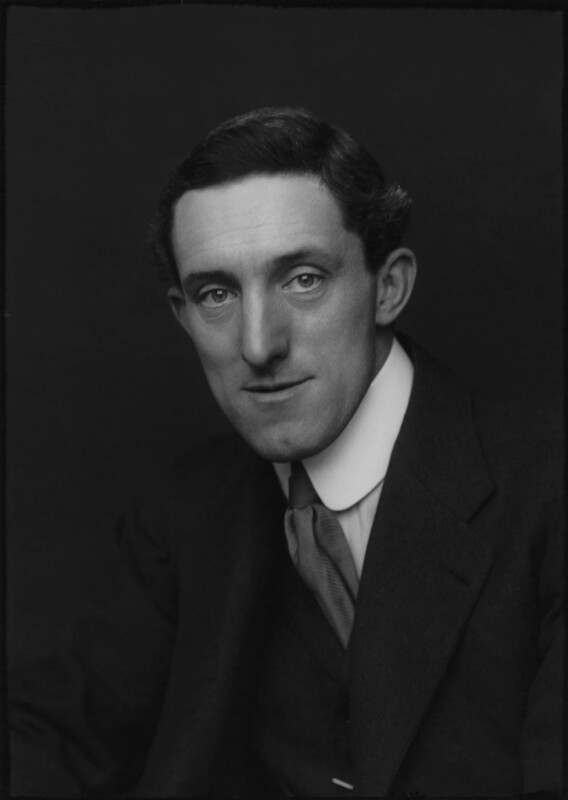
- Sir Percy Bates, 1913

Chairman of the Cunard Line
- In office 1930 – 16 October 1946

Deputy Chairman of the Cunard Line
- In office 1922–1930

Personal details
- Born: Percy Elly Bates; 12 May 1879 Wavertree, Liverpool, England
- Died: 16 October 1946 (aged 67) Hinderton Hall, Neston, Cheshire, England
- Occupation: Shipowner

Sir Percy Elly Bates, 4th Baronet (12 May 1879 – 16 October 1946) was an English shipowner.

Bates was born in Wavertree, Liverpool, the second son of Sir Edward Percy Bates, 2nd Baronet. He was educated at Winchester College from 1892 to 1897 and was then apprenticed to William Johnston & Co, a Liverpool shipowners. After his father's death in 1899 he joined the family shipping business, Edward Bates & Sons.

Bates succeeded his older brother, Edward, as 4th Baronet in 1903. In 1910 he became a director of Cunard, becoming deputy chairman in 1922 and chairman in 1930, holding the post until his death. He became a director of the Morning Post in 1924 and chairman in 1930, holding the post until 1937.

On the outbreak of the First World War Bates joined the Transport Department of the Admiralty, and later became Director of Commercial Services of the new Ministry of Shipping, responsible for the shipment of civilian supplies. For these services he was appointed Knight Grand Cross of the Order of the British Empire (GBE) in the 1920 Birthday Honours. He was also appointed in 1920 High Sheriff of Cheshire. In the Second World War he served on the Advisory Committee and the Liner Committee of the Ministry of War Transport.

Bates suffered a heart attack in his office on 14 October 1946 and died at his home, Hinderton Hall, Neston, Cheshire, two days later.

Bates's only child, Edward Percy, was killed over Germany in 1945 while serving as a Pilot Officer with the Royal Air Force.

== Footnotes ==
Baronetage of the United Kingdom
Preceded by Edward Bates	Baronet (of Bellefield); 1903–1946	Succeeded by Geoffrey Bates
