= St Thomas' Church, Parkgate =

Coordinates: 53.2962°N 3.0832°W

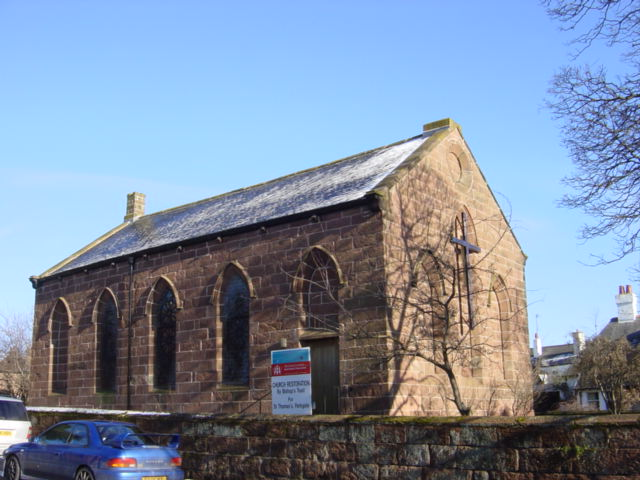
- St Thomas' Church, Parkgate

- Location in Cheshire
- OS grid reference: SJ 279 783
- Location: School Lane, Parkgate, Cheshire
- Country: England
- Denomination: Anglican
- Website: St Thomas, Parkgate

History
- Status: Chapel of ease
- Dedication: Saint Thomas the Apostle

Architecture
- Functional status: Active
- Heritage designation: Grade II
- Designated: 5 September 1995
- Architectural type: Chapel
- Style: Gothic Revival
- Completed: 1843

Administration
- Province: York
- Diocese: Chester
- Archdeaconry: Chester
- Deanery: Wirral, South
- Parish: Neston

Clergy
- Vicar: Revd Robert Hammond Robb

St Thomas' Church is in School Lane, Parkgate, Cheshire, England. It is an Anglican chapel of ease in the parish of St Mary and St Helen, Neston, the deanery of Wirral South, the archdeaconry of Chester, and the diocese of Chester. The church is recorded in the National Heritage List for England as a designated Grade II listed building. Because of its earlier associations with the fishing community, it has been called the "Fisherman's Church".

== History ==
St Thomas' was built in 1843 as a Congregational chapel. In 1858 it was sold to the Presbyterian church, but the congregation soon moved to a different building leaving St Thomas' empty. The Church of England leased it in 1910, and bought it in 1917, when it became a chapel of ease to the parish church in Neston.

By 1994 there were concerns about the stability of the building, it was closed in July of that year, and demolition seemed likely. The church was listed at Grade II the following year. In 2001 the Bishop's Trust for the Restoration of St Thomas' Parkgate was established. English Heritage gave a grant of £40,000 and together with fundraising by local groups, a total of £250,000 was made available for the church to be made safe and restored. It was re-dedicated on 4 July 2010 by Revd Peter Forster, Bishop of Chester.

== Architecture ==
The church is constructed in red sandstone with stone dressings, and a slate roof with stone copings. The authors of the Buildings of England series describe it as "a small sandstone box". Its plan consists of a five-bay continuous nave and chancel. Along the sides of the church are five lancet windows, the easternmost and westernmost windows on each side being blocked. There are also blocked stepped lancets at the west end, above which is a blocked round window. At the east end is a short porch and an entrance door, over which is a lancet window. On each side of the porch are small flat-headed windows. On the north side of the church is a chancel door approached by four steps. On the east gable is a finial with the appearance of a turret. Inside the church is a gallery at the rear, and oak furniture, which includes the altar, pulpit, reader's desk and communion rail. In the corner of the gallery is a small single-manual organ.

== See also ==
- Listed buildings in Neston
