= Willaston, Cheshire West =

Village in Cheshire, England

Coordinates: 53.292°N 3.005°W

Willaston
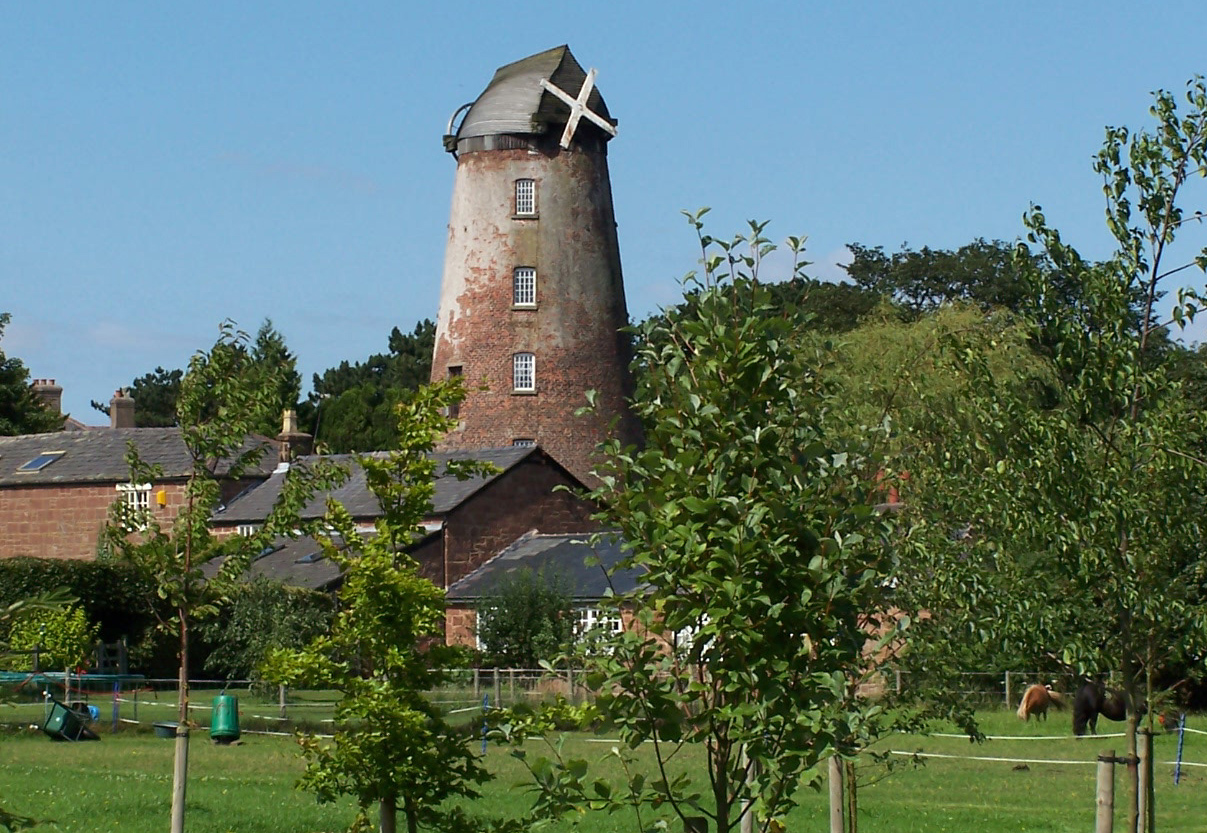
- Willaston Windmill

- Location within Cheshire
- OS grid reference: SJ330777
- Unitary authority: Cheshire West and Chester
- Ceremonial county: Cheshire
- Region: North West
- Country: England
- Sovereign state: United Kingdom
- Post town: NESTON
- Postcode district: CH64
- Dialling code: 0151
- Police: Cheshire
- Fire: Cheshire
- Ambulance: North West
- UK Parliament: Chester North and Neston

Willaston is a village situated on the Wirral Peninsula, in the unitary authority of Cheshire West and Chester, Cheshire, England. Centred on a village green, it is located between Neston and Ellesmere Port, less than a mile south of the Metropolitan Borough of Wirral boundary. It is located very closely to Eastham and Bromborough and just a short distance away from Neston.

== History ==
Willaston (or Wilaveston) was the earlier name of the Wirral Hundred (Hundred of Wilaveston), the peninsula's former administrative division, and one of the Hundreds of Cheshire. The Hundredal name is often taken from the administrative area for the Hundred, suggesting Willaston was once of some importance in the post-Roman period as the meeting place of the hundred court.

Later the village became a township and chapelry within the parish of Neston, the largest settlement on the Wirral until the early 19th century. In 1866 Willaston became a civil parish, on 1 April 1974 the parish was abolished. Willaston included part of the hamlet of Badgers Rake, which became part of the civil parish of Ledsham in 1933. The population of Willaston was recorded at 196 in 1801, 317 in 1851, 597 in 1901 and 1,458 in 1951.

The half timbered building, the 'Red Lion' was an inn built in 1631, although possibly a significant enlargement of an earlier construction. Located opposite the village green, it remained a public house until 1928 and was eventually renovated as a private residence.

Willaston Windmill, built in 1800, was the largest windmill in Wirral. During the early 20th century it was used for the production of flour and to grind cattle food. It remained working until about 1930, when its sails were destroyed in a storm. The windmill has also since been converted into a private dwelling.

== Community ==
Hadlow Road railway station, which served the village until its closure in 1955, became part of Wirral Country Park in 1973. The station building, signal box and eastbound platform have been renovated to their former 1950's condition. The former trackbed has become a public pathway, known as the 'Wirral Way'.

The local school, Willaston Church of England Primary School, is the only educational establishment in the village, though there are several playgroups in the area. Although there are no secondary schools in the area, Wirral Grammar School for Girls and Wirral Grammar School for Boys are situated nearby, as well as Neston High School and South Wirral High School - both a short car journey from the village. Willaston's local football club plays in the West Cheshire Amateur Football League Division 2.

The village is supported by The Willaston Residents and Business Community Interest Company known as 'Your Willaston'. The CIC is a not for profit organisation established to support residents and businesses alike to flourish in a well kept village. They seek to raise funds through events and activities and have responsibility for the Christmas Lights which are illuminated on the village green beach tree each year.

== Transport ==
The nearest railway station is Hooton, on the Wirral Line of the Merseyrail network.

The village is served by bus route 22, south towards Chester, and north towards Heswall and West Kirby.

== See also ==
- Listed buildings in Willaston, Cheshire West
- Willaston Old Hall
- Christ Church, Willaston
