= Gayton, Merseyside =

Coordinates: 53.319°N 3.101°W

Gayton
- Village
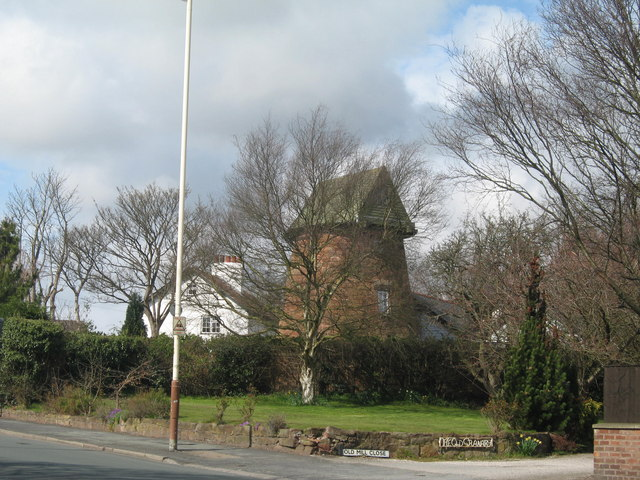
- The converted windmill seen from the junction of Old Mill Close and the A540 Telegraph Road

- Location within Merseyside
- Population: 3,110 (2001 Census)
- OS grid reference: SJ267808
  - London: 177 mi (285 km) SE
- Metropolitan borough: Wirral
- Metropolitan county: Merseyside
- Region: North West
- Country: England
- Sovereign state: United Kingdom
- Post town: WIRRAL
- Postcode district: CH60
- Dialling code: 0151
- ISO 3166 code: GB-WRL
- Police: Merseyside
- Fire: Merseyside
- Ambulance: North West
- UK Parliament: Wirral West

Gayton is a village in the Metropolitan Borough of Wirral, Merseyside, England. It is located on the Wirral Peninsula between Heswall and Parkgate. At the 2001 Census, the population of Gayton stood at 3,110.

== History ==
The name is of Viking origin, deriving from the Old Norse Geit-tún, meaning 'goat farmstead'. Gayton was formerly a township in the parish of Heswall, in the Wirral Hundred, in 1866 Gayton became a separate civil parish. The hamlets of Dawstone and Oldfield are also included as part of Gayton. The parish population was 100 in 1801, 144 in 1851, 180 in 1901 and 832 in 1951. Before local government reorganisation on 1 April 1974, it was part of Wirral Urban District in the county of Cheshire. On 1 April 1974 the parish was abolished.

William of Orange stayed at Gayton Hall in 1689 en route to the Battle of the Boyne in Ireland, and knighted his host, Sir William Glegg.

Gayton Windmill, built of red sandstone and Wirral's oldest tower mill, ceased operation in 1875. It has since been converted into a private residence.

== Geography ==
Gayton is on the western side of the Wirral Peninsula, and is situated at the eastern side of the Dee Estuary. The village is approximately 10 km (6.2 mi) south-south-east of the Irish Sea at Hoylake and about 8 km (5.0 mi) west-south-west of the River Mersey at Port Sunlight. The village is situated at an elevation of between 3–70 m (10–230 ft) above sea level.

== Transport ==
=== Rail ===
The nearest railway station to Gayton is Heswall.

=== Bus ===
Services operating in the Gayton area, as of January 2015:

Number	Route	Operator	Days of operation
77	Heswall–Woodside	Avon Buses	Monday–Saturday
85	Clatterbridge Hospital–Heswall	Avon Buses	Monday–Saturday
113	Heswall–New Ferry	A2B Travel	Monday–Saturday evenings
174	Lower Village–Heswall	A2B Travel	Monday–Saturday
472	Barnston–Liverpool	Arriva North West & Stagecoach	Monday–Friday peak times only
X22	Heswall–Chester	Al's Coaches	Monday–Saturday

== See also ==
- Gayton Hall, Wirral

== Bibliography ==
- Mortimer, William Williams (1847). The History of the Hundred of Wirral. London: Whittaker & Co. pp235-236.
