= St Mary's and St Helen's Church, Neston =

Coordinates: 53.2892°N 3.0643°W

St Mary and St Helen Church, Neston
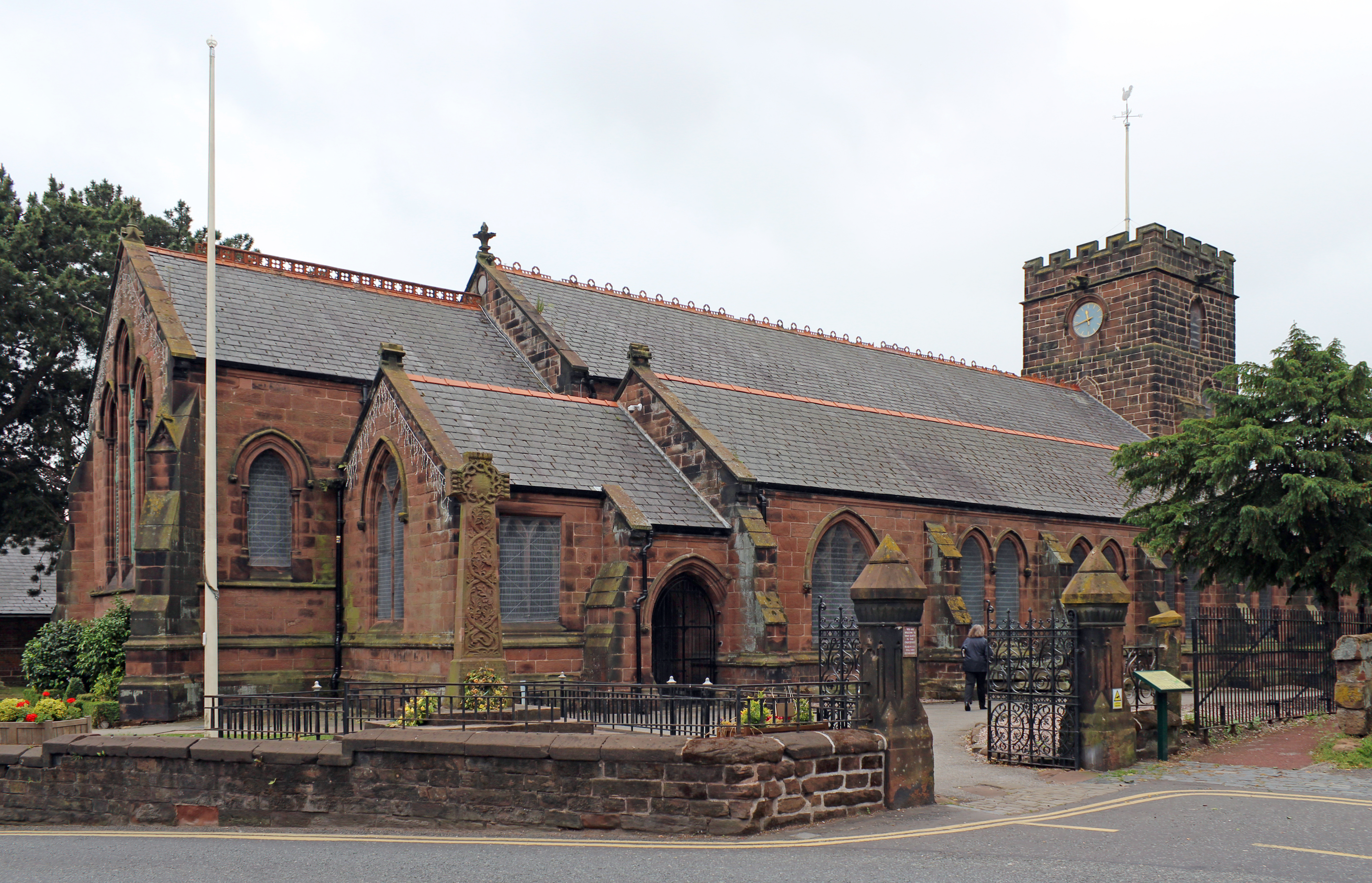
- St Mary and St Helen Church, Neston, from the north

- Location in Cheshire
- OS grid reference: SJ 292 775
- Location: Neston, Cheshire
- Country: England
- Denomination: Anglican
- Website: Neston, St Mary and St Helen

History
- Status: Parish church

Architecture
- Functional status: Active
- Heritage designation: Grade II*
- Designated: 27 December 1962
- Architect: J. Francis Doyle
- Architectural type: Church
- Style: Gothic, Gothic revival
- Completed: 1875

Specifications
- Materials: Red sandstone Slate tiled roof with red tile cresting

Administration
- Province: York
- Diocese: Chester
- Archdeaconry: Chester
- Deanery: Wirral South
- Parish: Neston

St Mary and St Helen Church is in the town of Neston, Cheshire, England. The church is recorded in the National Heritage List for England as a designated Grade II* listed building. It is an active Anglican parish church in the diocese of Chester, the archdeaconry of Chester and the deanery of Wirral South. Its benefice is combined with that of St Michael, Little Neston. St Thomas' Church, Parkgate, is a chapel of ease in the parish.

== History ==
The presence of a priest at Neston is recorded in the Domesday Book. The earliest written evidence of a church on the site dates from around 1170 when a church was founded by Ralph de Montalt, a baron of the court of the Earl of Chester. It is likely that an earlier church was on the site because when the floor was being relaid during the 19th century, fragments of pre-Conquest crosses were found. These were later shown to be "hiberno Norse" or Viking Age in origin. A further fragment was discovered in the church's belfry in the 1980s. These fragments are now mounted at the west end of the church. During the 18th century there was disagreement between some of the parishioners and the churchwardens when galleries were erected. The addition of the galleries caused damage to the fabric of the church and in 1871 an inspecting architect reported that the building was unsafe. Consequently, in 1874–75 the main body of the church was rebuilt by J. Francis Doyle, reusing some of the Norman material in Early English style.

== Architecture ==
=== Exterior ===
The church is built in sandstone. The roofs are of slate with a red tile ridge. The tower is the only old part of the church remaining. Richards describes it as "a rugged gargoyled pile of masonry with very little architectural refinement". The lower part probably includes some re-used Norman material. An additional storey was added to the tower in 1854. The body of the church consists of a six-bay nave with aisles, a two-bay chancel with a north vestry, and a south porch. The aisles are gabled and the nave has a clerestory.

=== Interior ===
The font dates from the 16th century; it is octagonal with quatrefoiled panels. This is the font in which Lady Hamilton was baptised as Emy Lyon on 12 May 1765. The only specifically designed memorial within the church is a carved stone in memory of a 14th-century priest. Some of the stained glass windows are designed by Edward Burne-Jones and made by Morris & Co.; others are by Kempe. Between the tower and the nave are elaborate wrought iron gates to the memory of Reginald Bushell who died in 1904.

The three-manual organ was built in 1900 by Forster and Andrews. There is a ring of eight bells. Four of these are by Rudhall of Gloucester dated 1731; the other four are by Mears and Stainbank of the Whitechapel Bell Foundry and are dated 1884. The parish registers begin in 1559 and record the baptism in the church in 1761 of Emma Lyon, who was later to become Lady Hamilton. The churchwardens' accounts date from 1701.

== External features ==
In the churchyard is a sundial dated 1717 consisting of a red sandstone vase-baluster on a square base. It is listed at Grade II. Close to the church, and also listed at Grade II, is a hearse house built in red sandstone with a slate roof and red ridge tiles. Susan Burney (daughter of the music historian Charles Burney, sister of the novelist Fanny Burney is buried in the churchyard. The churchyard contains the war graves of seven British service personnel of World War I.

== See also ==
- Grade II* listed buildings in Cheshire West and Chester
- Listed buildings in Neston
