= Christ Church, Willaston =

Coordinates: 53.2929°N 3.0087°W

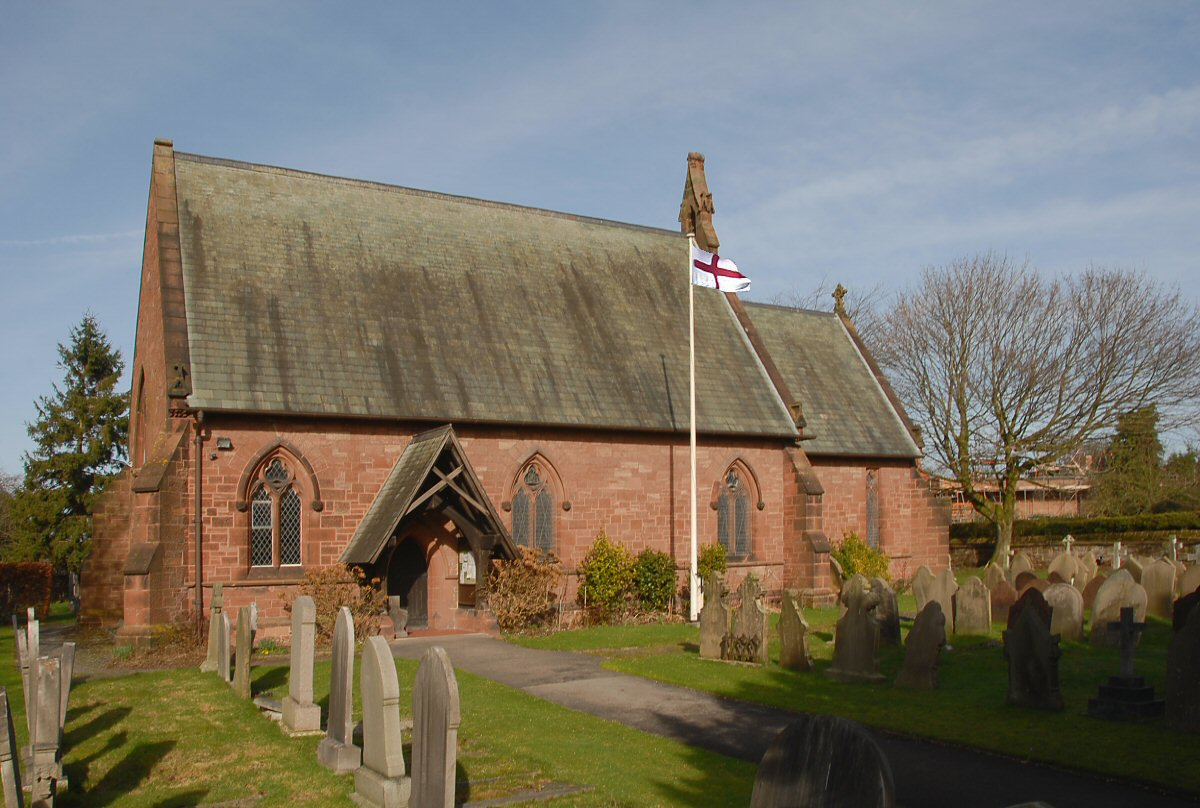
- Christ Church, Willaston, from the south

- Location in Cheshire
- OS grid reference: SJ 329 778
- Location: Neston Road, Willaston, Cheshire
- Country: England
- Denomination: Anglican
- Website: Christ Church, Willaston

History
- Status: Parish church

Architecture
- Functional status: Active
- Heritage designation: Grade II
- Designated: 29 April 1999
- Architect(s): Thomas Fulljames (1808-1874) and Frederick Sandham Waller (1822-1905); Bernard Miller
- Architectural type: Church
- Style: Gothic Revival
- Groundbreaking: 1854
- Completed: 1926

Specifications
- Materials: Sandstone, slate roofs

Administration
- Province: York
- Diocese: Chester
- Archdeaconry: Chester
- Deanery: Wirral South
- Parish: Willaston

Clergy
- Vicar: Revd Stephen Bazely

Christ Church is in Neston Road, Willaston, Cheshire, England. It is an active Anglican parish church in the deanery of Wirral South, the archdeaconry of Chester, and the diocese of Chester. The church is recorded in the National Heritage List for England as a designated Grade II listed building.

== History ==
Christ Church was built in 1854, the architects being Fulljames and Waller. The north aisle was added in 1926 by Bernard Miller.

== Architecture ==
The church is constructed in sandstone with Westmorland slate roofs. It has a porch in timber and stone. The plan consists of a four-bay nave with a clerestory, a north aisle, a south porch, a two-bay chancel, and a bellcote at the east end of the nave. The east window has three lights, and there are single-light windows along the sides of the chancel. The nave windows have two lights, and there is a four-light west window. The windows in the aisle and in the vestry have mullions carved as angels. On the chancel gable is a wheel-cross. The stained glass includes that in the east window by William Wailes, which dates from 1855. Windows elsewhere are by Kempe, dating from 1902, and by W. B. Simpson and Sons, dated 1897. There are also three windows by William T. Davies dated 1975, 1980 and 2000. The two-manual organ was built in 1925–26 by Nicholson, and restored in 1999 by David Wells.

== External features ==
The churchyard contains the war graves of seven service personnel of World War I and three of World War II.

== See also ==
- Listed buildings in Willaston, Cheshire West
