= Gayton Hall, Wirral =

Listed building in Merseyside, England

Gayton Hall
- Location within Merseyside

General information
- Location: Gayton Farm Road, Gayton, Wirral, Merseyside, England
- Coordinates: 53.3156°N 3.0923°W
- Year built: 17th century
- Client: Glegg family

Design and construction
- Designations

Listed Building – Grade II*
- Official name: Gayton Hall
- Designated: 15 November 1962
- Reference no.: 1184100

Gayton Hall is a country house on Gayton Farm Road in Gayton, Merseyside, England. It was built in the 17th century and refaced in the following century. The house is constructed in brick with stone dressings, and has an Ionic doorcase. William of Orange stayed in the house in 1690. In the grounds is a dovecote dated 1663. Both the house and the dovecote are recorded in the National Heritage List for England as designated Grade II* listed buildings.

== History ==
Gayton Hall was built in the 17th century, and refaced in the early 18th century. It was the home of the Glegg family. William of Orange stayed with William Glegg in the house before travelling to Ireland in 1690.

== Architecture ==
The house is constructed in brick on a moulded stone base, and has stone dressings and a slate roof. It is in three storeys, and has a southwest front of nine bays, the central three bays projecting forward. There are stone bands between the storeys, quoins on the corners, and at the top of the house is a cornice and a parapet. There is a central doorcase with engaged fluted Ionic columns and an open pediment with scrolls and in the seventh bay there is a projecting porch. The windows are sashes with keystones, the windows on the lower two floors having 12 panes, and those on the top floor have 16 panes. The northwest face is in four bays, and contains similar windows. The southeast face has two unequal gables, with casement windows on the ground floor. At the rear the central two bays are recessed with gables, and contain casement windows. These are flanked on each side by three bays containing sash windows. Projecting from the left three bays is a single-storey kitchen wing with a first floor terrace and a balustrade. Inside the house are two Jacobean staircases with turned balusters and square newels surmounted by ball finials.

== Dovecote ==
In the grounds to the north of the house is an octagonal dovecote built in brick on a stone base with stone dressings. The entrance has flush quoins and a plain lintel inscribed with the date 1663 and the initials "EG" (for Edward Glegg). There are two vertical bull's eye openings, one above the doorway, and the other at the rear. Inside there are nesting boxes for 1,000 birds.

== Appraisal ==
The hall and the dovecote were both designated as Grade II* listed buildings on 15 November 1962. Grade II* is the middle of the three grades of listing and is applied to "particularly important buildings of more than special interest". Hartwell et al in the Buildings of England series describe the southwest front as "handsome".

== See also ==
- Grade II* listed buildings in Merseyside
- Listed buildings in Gayton, Merseyside
