= Chester North and Neston =

UK Parliament constituency (since 2024)

- County constituency for the House of Commons
- Interactive map of boundaries since 2024
- Location within North West England
- County: Cheshire
- Electorate: 72,327 (March 2020)
- Major settlements: Chester (part), Neston

Current constituency
- Created: 2024
- Member of Parliament: Samantha Dixon (Labour)
- Seats: One
- Created from: City of Chester & Ellesmere Port and Neston (part)

Chester North and Neston is a constituency of the House of Commons in the UK Parliament. Further to the completion of the 2023 review of Westminster constituencies, it was first contested in the 2024 general election. The Member of Parliament elected in 2024 is Samantha Dixon of the Labour Party, who was formerly MP for the predecessor constituency of City of Chester from 2022 to 2024.

== Constituency profile ==
The Chester North and Neston constituency is located in Cheshire in the district of Cheshire West and Chester. It contains most of the city of Chester and the rural areas to its north-west stretching along the England-Wales border to the Dee Estuary. Other settlements include the small town of Neston and the villages of Little Neston, Willaston and Saughall. Chester is a popular tourist and retail destination; it is a historic cathedral city and was a major Roman settlement.

Residents of the constituency have average levels of wealth and are more likely to be degree-educated and work in professional occupations compared to national averages. White people make up 93% of the population. Most of the constituency has below-average levels of deprivation and the neighbourhoods of Abbot's Meads and Boughton Heath are particularly affluent, however there is deprivation in the Chester suburb of Blacon, which was once one of the largest council estates in Europe. At the local council, Chester and Neston are represented mostly by Labour Party councillors, whilst the rural areas between them elected Conservatives. At the 2016 referendum on European Union membership, an estimated 53% of voters in the constituency favoured remaining in the EU compared to 48% nationally.

== Boundaries ==
The constituency is composed of the following wards of the Borough of Cheshire West and Chester (as they existed on 1 December 2020):

- Blacon; Chester City & the Garden Quarter; Great Boughton; Little Neston; Neston; Newton & Hoole; Parkgate; Saughall & Mollington; Upton; Willaston & Thornton.

The seat covers the majority of, and replaces, the former City of Chester constituency, comprising areas of Chester to the north of the River Dee, including the city centre. It extends northwards to include the town of Neston, previously part of the abolished Ellesmere Port and Neston constituency.

== Members of Parliament ==
City of Chester and Ellesmere Port and Neston prior to 2024

Election	Member	Party
2024	Samantha Dixon	Labour

== Elections ==
=== Elections in the 2020s ===
General election 2024: Chester North and Neston
Party	Candidate	Votes	%	±%
Labour	Samantha Dixon	22,258	49.8	−0.5
Conservative	Simon Eardley	10,388	23.2	−15.3
Reform	Nicholas Goulding	5,870	13.1	+10.3
Green	Nick Brown	4,102	9.2	+7.0
Liberal Democrats	Stephen Gribbon	2,076	4.6	−1.6
Rejected ballots		216		
Majority		11,870	26.6	+14.7
Turnout		44,694	63.7	−10.9
Registered electors		70,215		
Labour hold		Swing	+7.4	

Changes are from the notional 2019 results on the 2024 boundaries.

=== Elections in the 2010s ===
2019 notional result
Party	Vote	%
Labour	27,137	50.3
Conservative	20,746	38.5
Liberal Democrats	3,337	6.2
Brexit Party	1,502	2.8
Green	1,202	2.2
Turnout	53,924	74.6
Electorate	72,327	
