= Willaston Old Hall =

Former manor house in Willaston, Cheshire West and Chester, England

Coordinates: 53.29172°N 3.00631°W

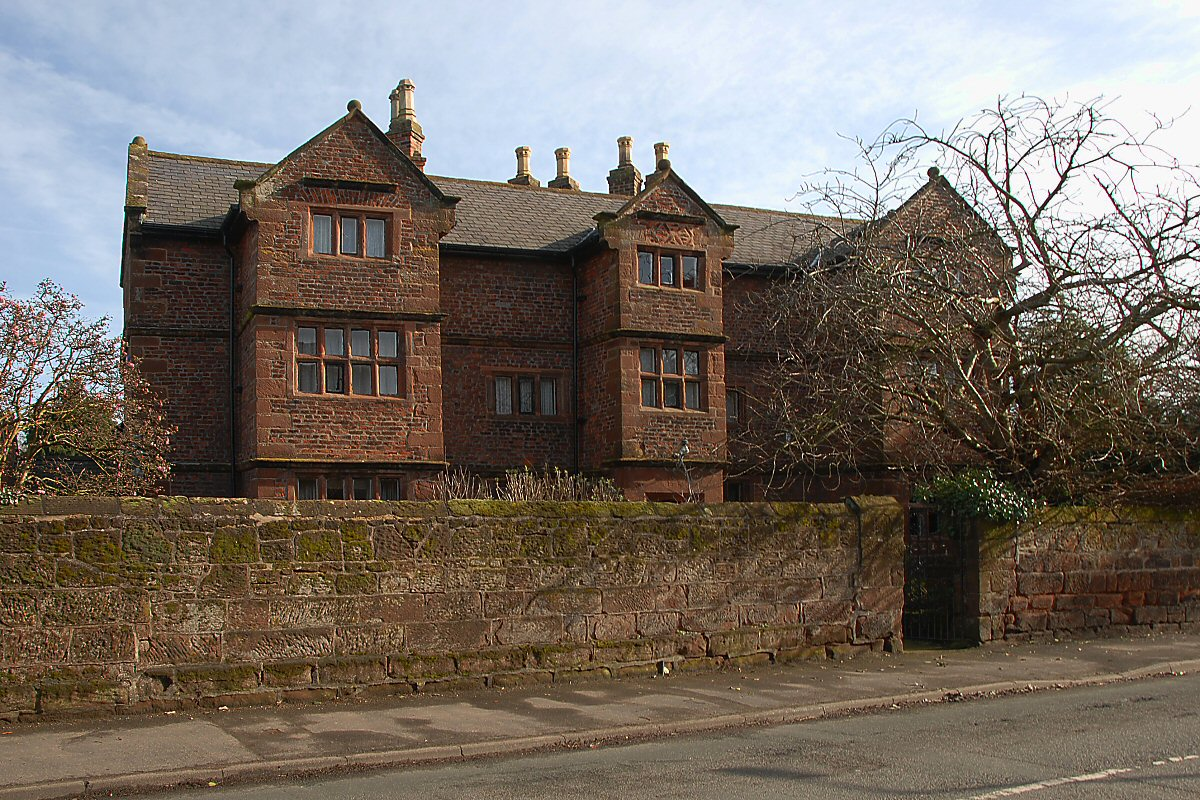
Willaston Old Hall

Willaston Old Hall is a former manor house in the village of Willaston, in the unitary authority of Cheshire West and Chester, England. The building carries the date 1558, but both the authors of the Buildings of England series, and Figueirdo and Treuherz, argue that this date is too early for the architectural style of the house. Figueirdo and Treuherz are of the opinion that it was built in the early 17th century for Hugh Bennet. The house is constructed in red brick and stands on a red sandstone plinth. It has sandstone dressings and quoins, and a slate roof with stone ball finials. The entrance front is symmetrical, and consists of five bays, with three storeys. The central and the outer bays project forward and are gabled. The windows are mullioned and transomed. The house is recorded in the National Heritage List for England as a designated Grade II* listed building.

== See also ==
- Grade II* listed buildings in Cheshire West and Chester
- Listed buildings in Willaston, Cheshire West
