= Listed buildings in Gayton, Merseyside =

Gayton is a village in Wirral, Merseyside, England. It contains four buildings that are recorded in the National Heritage List for England as designated listed buildings. Of these, two are listed at Grade II*, the middle of the three grades, and the others are at Grade II, the lowest grade. The listed buildings consist of a country house, a dovecote, a farmhouse, and a former windmill.

== Key ==
Grade	Criteria
II*	Particularly important buildings of more than special interest
II	Buildings of national importance and special interest

== Buildings ==
Name and location	Photograph	Date	Notes	Grade
Gayton Hall; 53.31561°N 3.09226°W	—	17th century	A country house in brick on a stone base with stone dressings. It has three storeys and a main front of nine bays, The middle three bays projecting forward and containing an Ionic doorcase. Inside the house are two Jacobean staircases.	II*
Dovecote, Gayton Hall; 53.31602°N 3.09214°W	—	1663	The dovecote is built in brick with stone dressings, and has an octagonal plan. The entrance has flush quoins and a lintel inscribed with initials and the date. On the front and back are vertical bull's eye openings.	II*
Windmill; 53.32299°N 3.08652°W		Mid 18th century or earlier	The windmill is in stone and consists of a conical two-storey tower. It contains small windows and an entrance with a rusticated lintel. The windmill has since been converted into a house.	II
Old Farm; 53.31578°N 3.09333°W	—	1761	A brick farmhouse with a roof partly in stone and partly in slate. It has two storeys, and a front of eight bays; the left four bays were the original farmhouse, and the other four bays are from a farm building later converted into residential use. The windows are a mixture of sashes, some of which are horizontally-sliding, and casements.	II
