= Ralph Millington =

English footballer (1930–1999)

Personal information
- Date of birth: 18 June 1930
- Place of birth: Neston, England
- Date of death: December 1999 (aged 69)
- Place of death: Heswall, England
- Position: Centre half

Senior career*
Years	Team	Apps	(Gls)
–1950	Neston		
1950–1961	Tranmere Rovers	357	(3)
1961–	Ellesmere Port		
Total		357	(3)
- * Club domestic league appearances and goals

Ralph Millington (18 June 1930 – December 1999) was an English footballer who played as centre half for Neston, Tranmere Rovers and Ellesmere Port. He made 381 appearances for Tranmere, of which 357 were in the English Football League.
