= Parkgate, Cheshire =

Village in Cheshire, England

Coordinates: 53.296°N 3.085°W

Parkgate
- Village
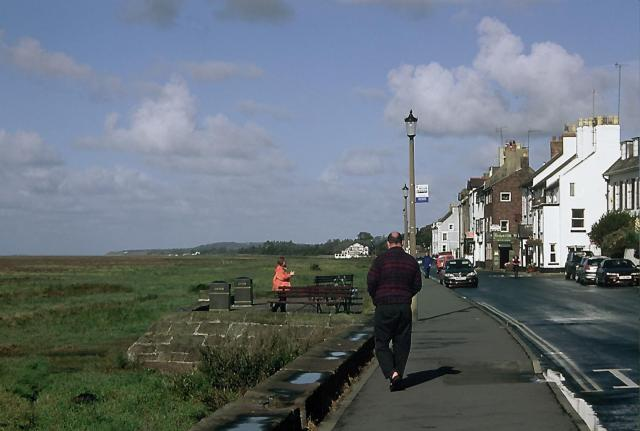
- Salt marsh and former quayside, 2002

- Location within Cheshire
- Population: 4,972 (Ward, 2021)
- OS grid reference: SJ277782
- Civil parish: Neston
- Unitary authority: Cheshire West and Chester
- Ceremonial county: Cheshire
- Region: North West
- Country: England
- Sovereign state: United Kingdom
- Post town: NESTON
- Postcode district: CH64
- Dialling code: 0151
- Police: Cheshire
- Fire: Cheshire
- Ambulance: North West
- UK Parliament: Chester North and Neston

Parkgate /pɑːkˈɡeɪt/ is a village on the Wirral Peninsula, England. It is part of the unitary authority of Cheshire West and Chester in the county of Cheshire. Parkgate lies on the banks of the Dee Estuary, abutting 39 square miles (100 km^{2}) of salt marsh. Part of the civil parish of Neston, Parkgate also forms part of the Neston built-up area, as defined by the Office for National Statistics. The Parkgate electoral ward in Cheshire West and Chester had a population of 4,972 at the 2021 census.

== History ==
Parkgate was an important port from the start of the 18th century, in particular as an embarkation point for Ireland. The Dee, which was a shipping route to the Roman city of Deva (Chester), had partly silted up by AD 383, creating a need for a port further downstream. Quays were built, first at Burton and later near the small town of Neston, but further silting required yet another resiting slightly further downstream near the gate of Neston's hunting park. Hence the settlement of Parkgate was born.

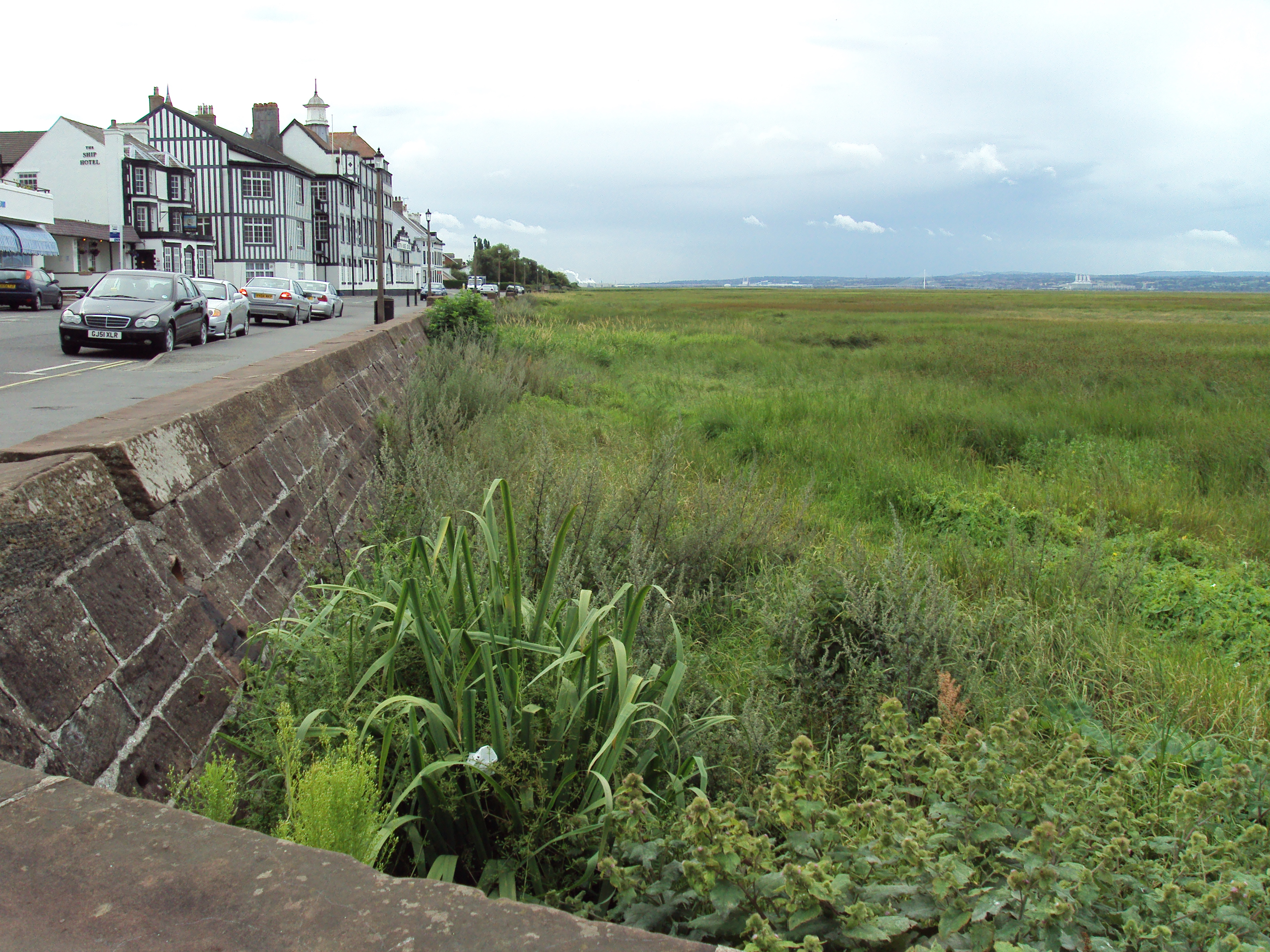
Marsh, sea wall and Mostyn House School

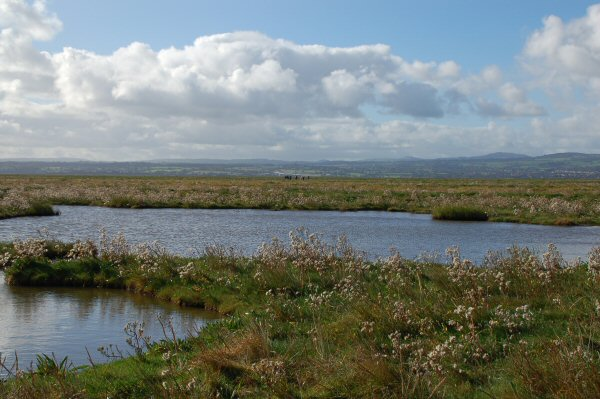
The marshes

Two distinguished guests stayed at local hostelries. One was Lord Nelson's mistress, (Lady) Emma Hamilton, who was born in nearby Ness and bathed at Parkgate, apparently as a cure for a skin complaint; another was George Frideric Handel. Contrary to often-repeated legend, he did not stay in Parkgate before sailing to Dublin in November 1741 for the first performance of his Messiah, he travelled from Holyhead; however, he returned from Ireland via Parkgate in August 1742.

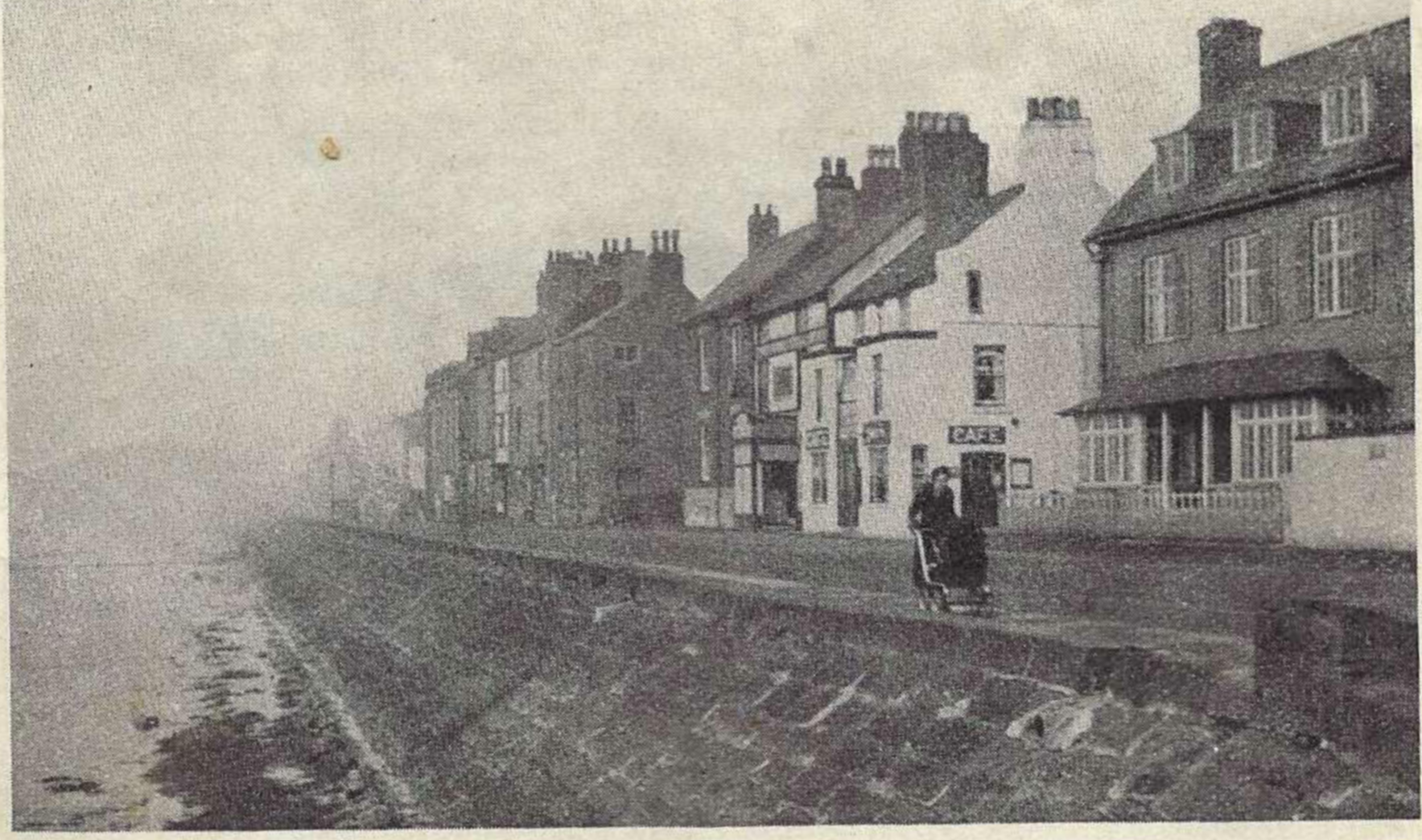
The salt marsh and quayside, 1938

As the Dee silted up even more, Parkgate became unusable as a port and was superseded by the port of Liverpool, on the nearby river Mersey. Towards the end of the 18th century, Parkgate was popular as a seaside resort with bathers but this diminished as the sands of the estuary were consumed with grass. Sailing from Parkgate across the estuary to Bagillt was still possible in 1864, as there is a report of an accident in which the landlord of the Pengwern Arms and his brother were drowned when trying to land in rough sea conditions; three others survived. However, as silting progressed, with no beach and no direct access to the sea, Parkgate could manage only small subsistence from fishing and shrimps. The silting of the Dee has been accelerated by the deliberate introduction of the invasive colonising grass Sporobolus anglicus in Connah's Quay in 1928, resulting in the growth of extensive marshlands.

Mostyn House School, a striking black-and-white building, was opened in Parkgate in 1855. From 1862 until it closed in 2010, it was run by the Grenfell family, most recently as an independent co-educational day school. Sir Wilfred Grenfell (1865–1940), a medical missionary to Newfoundland and Labrador, was born in Parkgate and was a pupil at the school. The sixth Duke of Westminster's children attended Mostyn House, including his son the 7th Duke.

During the Second World War, two of Parkgate's houses which contained cellars were converted into air raid shelters for public protection from German bombing. Small lights were placed on the marsh to trick German bombers into thinking settlements were there. After the war, Parkgate flourished as a desirable residential area. The surrounds became a conservation area in 1973.

== Notable buildings ==
A row of three houses – one formerly a butcher's shop – overlooking the anchorage was built in the early 18th century for the Mostyn estate; they are Grade II* listed. The chapel of Mostyn House School, built in 1895 in red brick and terracotta, is also Grade II* listed.

The Anglican Church of St. Thomas was built in 1843 as a Congregational chapel. It reopened for worship in May 2010, having been closed since it was declared unsafe in 1994.

== Community ==
An affluent village, it is popular with tourists and birdwatchers. During seasonal high tides, the water reaches the sea wall and visitors come to the village to witness the unusual sight. Birdwatchers also come at this time to see the birds usually hidden in the grasses of the marshland. A popular location is the Old Baths site, to the north of the village, from which the marshes can be viewed from a parked vehicle. Sightings are recorded daily on a local website, which covers the whole Dee Estuary.

The marshlands of Parkgate are managed by the RSPB as part of the Dee Estuary Nature Reserve. In March 2022, an area of around 0.4 square miles (1 km^{2}) of reedbed was destroyed by a fire, thought to have been started deliberately.

== Transport ==
Bus services are operated by Arriva Merseyside and Al’s Coaches; routes connect the village with Neston, Chester, Liverpool, Heswall and West Kirby.

Neston railway station is the closest station, with services running southbound to Wrexham and northbound to Bidston, enabling connections to the Wirral Line on the Merseyrail network between West Kirby and Liverpool.

Parkgate railway station previously served the village on the single tracked Hooton to West Kirby branch of the Birkenhead Railway before closing to passengers in 1956. The old trackbed now forms part of the Wirral Way country park.
