= Ness, Cheshire =

Coordinates: 53.275°N 3.046°W

Ness
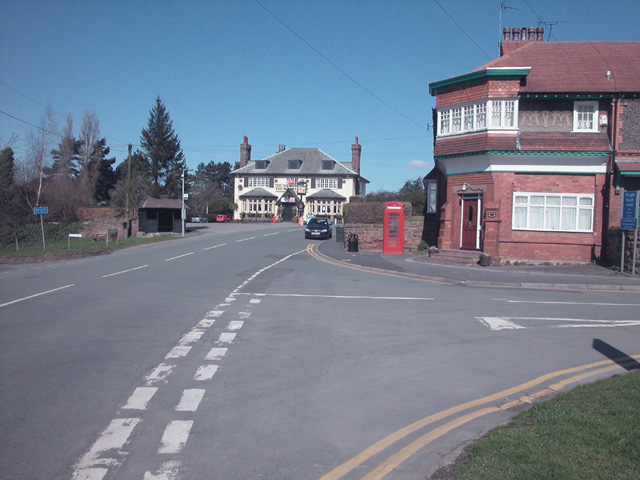
- Neston Road through Ness; The Wheatsheaf public house in the distance

- Location within Cheshire
- Population: 1,620 (2001 Census) (Burton & Ness Ward)
- OS grid reference: SJ303758
- Civil parish: Neston
- Unitary authority: Cheshire West and Chester
- Ceremonial county: Cheshire
- Region: North West
- Country: England
- Sovereign state: United Kingdom
- Post town: NESTON
- Postcode district: CH64
- Dialling code: 0151
- Police: Cheshire
- Fire: Cheshire
- Ambulance: North West
- UK Parliament: Chester North and Neston

Ness is a village on the Wirral Peninsula, in the part that remains in the ceremonial county of Cheshire, England. It is situated near to the town of Neston, in the unitary authority area of Cheshire West and Chester. It constitutes part of the Burton & Ness Ward of the district, with the ward having a total population of 1,620 in the 2001 Census.

Local attraction Ness Botanic Gardens opened in 1898 and is now administered by the University of Liverpool.

Lord Nelson's mistress, Emma Hamilton, was born in Ness.

The Errington Baronetcy, of Ness in the County Palatine of Chester, was created in the Baronetage of the United Kingdom on 26 June 1963 for the barrister and Conservative politician Eric Errington. The present holder of the title is the 3rd Baronet of Ness, Sir Robin Davenport Errington, Bt.

== History ==
Ness was formerly a township in the parish of Neston, in 1866 Ness became a separate civil parish, on 1 April 1974 the parish was abolished. In 1951 the parish had a population of 596. From 1974 to 2009 it was in Ellesmere Port and Neston district.

== See also ==
- Listed buildings in Neston
