= Listed buildings in Willaston, Cheshire West =

Willaston is a village in the unitary authority of Cheshire West and Chester, England. In and around the village are 16 buildings that are recorded in the National Heritage List for England as designated listed buildings. Of these, one is listed at Grade II*, the middle grade, and the others are at Grade II. Most of the listed buildings are houses, or farms with associated structures; the other buildings include the village church, a former windmill converted for domestic use, a war memorial, and a former railway station used as a visitor centre.

== Key ==
Grade	Criteria
II*	Particularly important buildings of more than special interest
II	Buildings of national importance and special interest

== Buildings ==
Name and location	Photograph	Date	Notes	Grade
The Farm; 53.29249°N 3.00702°W		1616	This originated as a farmhouse, and was later converted into a house and a bank. Possibly with a timber-framed core, it is in rendered brick, and has slate roofs with coped gables. The house is in two storeys, and has a four-bay front, the first bay projecting as a gabled cross-wing. The upper storeys are jettied. The windows are sashes, two in half-dormers. Above the door is an oculus.	II
Ashtree Farmhouse; 53.28991°N 3.00625°W		Early 17th century	A cross wing was added in 1697. The original part of the farmhouse is timber-framed with rendered brick nogging and stone dressings on a stone plinth. It has a slate roof, it is in a single storey with an attic, and it has a two-bay front containing a gabled half-dormer. The cross wing is in brick and has two storeys and an attic. Its windows are mullioned or mullioned and transomed, and in the gable are two elliptical openings.	II
Old Red Lion; 53.29206°N 3.00765°W		1631	Originating as two houses, later converted into a public house, and then into a dwelling, the building is timber-framed with plastered panels on a stone plinth. It has a slate roof. The house is in two storeys, and has a four-bay front. The first bay projects forward and is jettied with a gable. The windows are mullioned.	II
Pollard Inn; 53.29151°N 3.00774°W		1637	This originated as a manor house, it was later converted into a farmhouse, and then into a public house. It is built in red sandstone, and has a massive stone chimney stock. There are two brick extensions; the roofs are slated. The original part is in two storeys with an attic, and has a gabled front. Some windows are mullioned; the others are a mix of sashes, and casements.	II
Atworth House and Terrace; 53.29232°N 3.00933°W		Mid 17th century	This originated as a farmhouse and farm buildings, later converted into a house and a row of cottages. They are built in sandstone with roughcast fronts, and have slate roofs. They are in two storeys, the house having a front of two bays, and each cottage having one bay. All the windows are horizontally-sliding sashes.	II
Willaston Old Hall; 53.29172°N 3.00631°W		17th century	A former manor house, it is built in brick on a sandstone plinth, with sandstone dressings and a slate roof. The house is in three storeys, and has a symmetrical five-bay front, the outer and central bays projecting forwards under gables with ball finials. The windows are mullioned or mullioned and transomed. A cornice runs between the floors.	II*
Bank House; 53.29238°N 3.00662°W		Late 17th century	A brick house on a rendered plinth with a slate roof. It is in a single storey with an attic, and has a two-bay front. In the ground floor is a doorway and a small-pane casement window, and in the attic is a gabled dormer containing a sash window. Inside the house is an inglenook.	II
Midland Bank; 53.29238°N 3.00673°W		Late 17th century	Originating as a house, and later used as a bank, this is built in brick on a sandstone plinth, and has a slate roof with coped gables. It is in two storeys with an attic, and has a two-bay front. The windows on the front are sashes, and on the left side is a blocked mullioned window.	II
Farm building behind The Farm; 53.29264°N 3.00668°W		Mid 18th century	The farm building is in partly rendered brick, and has a slate roof with coped gables. It is in a single storey, and extends for five bays. It contains arched openings, ventilators in a diamond pattern, and pitch holes.	II
Willaston Mill; 53.29832°N 3.01053°W		1805	The former windmill has been converted into a house. It is constructed in brick with a wooden cap, and consists of a tapering tower with a circular plan. The tower is in five stages on a basement, and has segmental-headed openings, French windows, and casements.	II
The Laburnums; 53.29229°N 3.00767°W		Early 19th century	A roughcast brick house with a slate roof and coped gables. It is in three storeys, and has a three-bay front, with single-storey extension at both ends. The windows are casements.	II
Christ Church; 53.29286°N 3.00868°W		1854	The church was designed by Fulljames and Walker, and a north aisle and vestry were added in 1926. It is built in sandstone with Westmorland slate roofs. The plan consists of a nave with a north aisle, a chancel with a north vestry, and a south porch. There is a bellcote on the east nave gable. The stained glass includes windows by William Wailes and by C. E. Kempe.	II
The Lydiate; 53.29644°N 3.02342°W		1857	A former manor house, it is built in brick with stone dressings and a slate roof in Italianate style. The entrance front is in two storeys, and has three bays, the centre bay protruding forward as a three-stage tower with a pyramidal roof. Also on this front are giant panelled pilasters, a round-headed entrance, and balustraded balconies. The garden front is in two storeys with an attic, and has four irregular bays.	II
Lydiate Lodge; 53.29757°N 3.02048°W		1857	A lodge to The Lydiate, later extended. It is in red sandstone with a slate roof. The lodge is in a single story, and has an entrance front of three bays. Flanking the pedimented entrance are round-headed slit windows, with sash windows in the lateral bays. The front facing the street is in four bays, the lateral bays projecting forwards under gables and containing sash windows. The central two bays contain casement windows.	II
Hadlow Road railway station 53.28862°N 3.00584°W		1866	A former railway station and stationmaster's house built for the Birkenhead, Lancs and Cheshire Junction Railway. It is constructed in brick on a stone plinth with stone dressings and a slate roof. The station is in a single storey, and has a four-bay front, and the house is in two storeys. The station closed to passengers in 1956, and closed altogether in 1962. The trackway was converted into a footpath, the Wirral Way, and the station turned into a museum and visitor centre.	II
War memorial 53.29255°N 3.00877°W		1921	The war memorial is in the churchyard of Christ Church. It is in Storeton sandstone, and consists of a square pillar with gabled angle buttresses, on a base of three steps, and has an octagonal domed turret surmounted by a bronze Latin cross. On the south front is a bronze plaque with inscriptions and the names of those lost in the two World Wars.	II
