= Dee Estuary =

River estuary between England and Wales

- Site of Special Scientific Interest
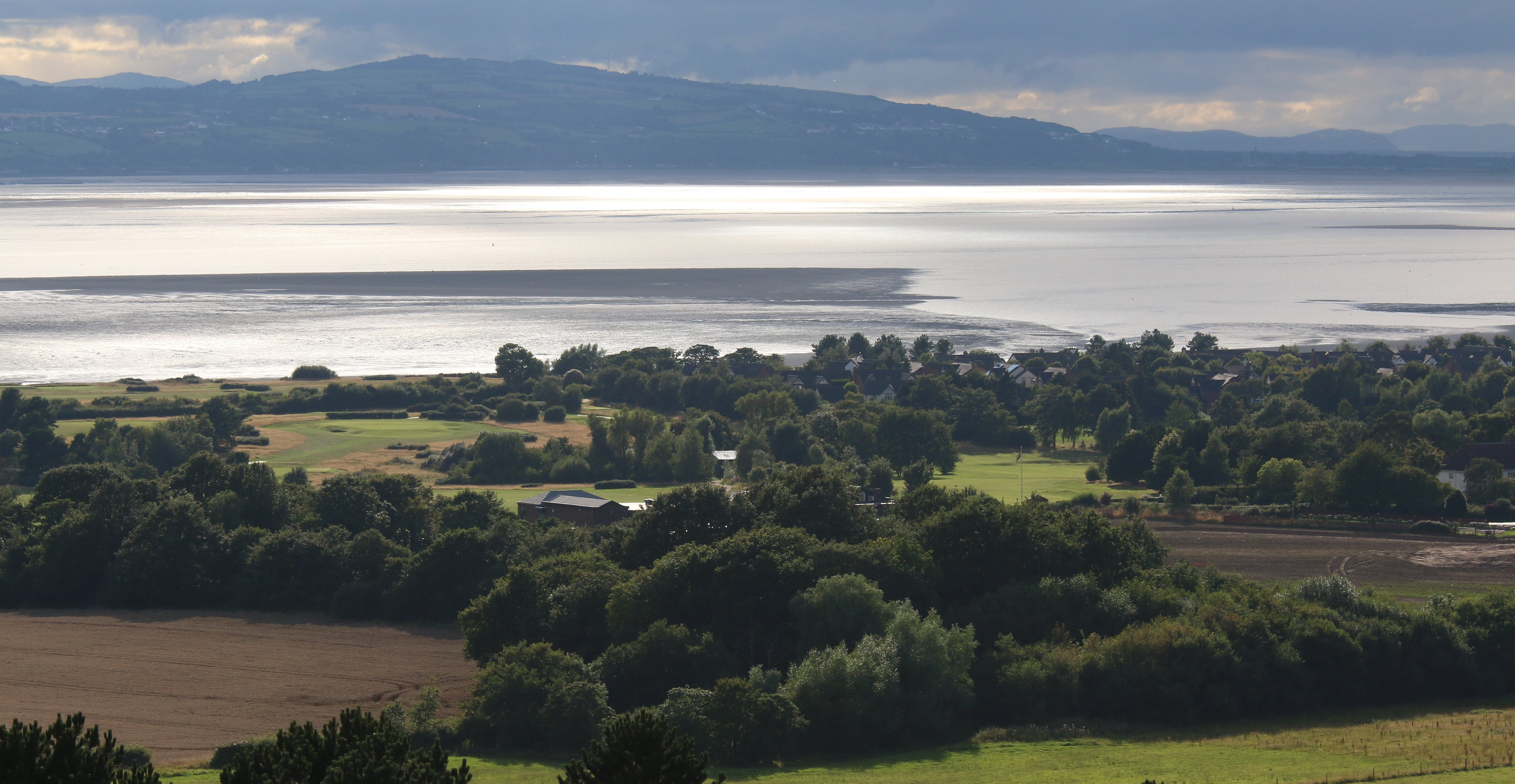
- Across the estuary towards North Wales from Thurstaston in Wirral

- Location within Flintshire
- Location of Dee Estuary.
- Area of search: Merseyside and Cheshire, England; Flintshire, Wales
- Grid reference: SJ200800
- Coordinates: 53.309°N 3.157°W
- Interest: Geological
- Area: 13,679.7 ha (33,803 acres)
- Notification date: 1954 /1984

Designations

Ramsar Wetland
- Official name: The Dee Estuary
- Designated: 17 July 1985
- Reference no.: 298

The Dee Estuary (Welsh: Aber Dyfrdwy) is a large estuary by means of which the River Dee flows into Liverpool Bay. Beginning near Shotton, a five-mile (8 km) canalised section widens to form the estuary, which serves as a boundary between England's Wirral Peninsula and Wales' Flintshire coast. Their respective coastlines are fronted by towns and villages.

== Geology ==
The estuary is unusual in that comparatively little water occupies so large a basin. One theory is that larger rivers such as the Severn and/or Mersey once flowed into the Dee. The current view is that the estuary owes its origin to the passage of glacial ice southeastwards from the Irish Sea during successive ice ages, eroding a broad and shallow iceway through the relatively soft Triassic sandstones and Coal Measures mudstones underlying the area. The inner parts of this channel were filled by glacially derived sands and gravels long ago, and infilling by mud and silt has continued since. It is also thought that before the ice ages, the estuary received larger river flows as the upper Severn flowed into the Dee near Chirk. For a period, the Mersey may also have flowed into the Dee by means of a channel which it cut through the base of the Wirral Peninsula.

== Conservation ==
The estuary is a major wildlife area and one of the most important estuaries in Britain, amongst the most important in Europe for its populations of waders and wildfowl. The Environment Agency is the Conservation Authority, and the estuary is protected or listed under several schemes:

- Site of Special Scientific Interest (SSSI)
- Special Protection Area (SPA)
- Sensitive Marine Area (SMA)
- Natura 2000 site
- Ramsar site

Large parts of the area are within the RSPB's Dee Estuary Nature Reserve.

== Fishery ==
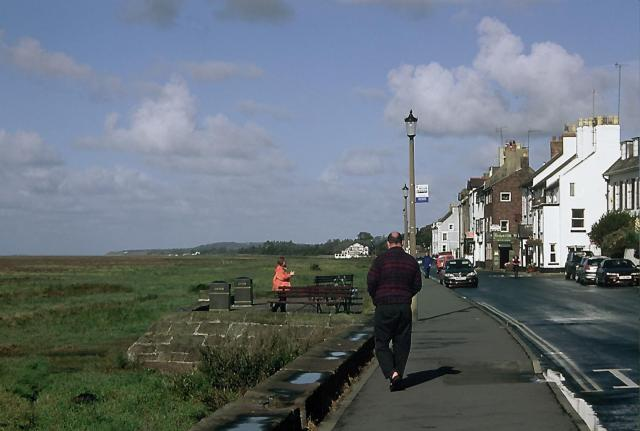
The Dee estuary at Parkgate, Wirral

The estuary supports some important natural fisheries, including salmon and trout on their way to and from the freshwater river, as well as sea-fisheries and shell-fisheries, especially cockles.

== Trade and industry ==
From earliest times, the Dee estuary was a major trading and military route, to and from Chester. From about the 14th century, Chester provided facilities for trade with Ireland, Spain, and Germany, and seagoing vessels would "lay to" in the Dee awaiting favourable winds and tides. As the Dee started to silt up, harbouring facilities developed on the Wirral bank at Shotwick, Burton, Neston, Parkgate, Dawpool, and "Hoyle Lake" or Hoylake. The excavation of the New Cut in 1737, to improve access to Chester, diverted the river's course to the Welsh side of the estuary, but failed to stem the silting up of the river, and Chester's trading function declined as that of Liverpool on the River Mersey grew. However, Chester was still a major port of passenger embarkation for Ireland until the early 19th century.

The Dee Estuary was industrialised from quite early on in the Industrial Revolution, and some industry remains today. Notable among these are Shotton Steel, formerly owned by John Summers & Sons, and now owned by Tata Steel; the gas-fired power station at Connah's Quay; three separate paper mills; a chemical manufacturing plant; and numerous smaller manufacturing industries. The estuary also receives the treated sewage effluent from Queensferry works and from Chester sewage treatment works. At the mouth of the estuary is the natural gas sweetening plant at Point of Ayr on the site of the former colliery. There are also commercial docks at Mostyn although their use is limited by the tide.

Signs of past industry are visible along the whole length of the estuary especially on the Welsh side. Large stretches of what now appear as flood embankments are long abandoned industrial waste heaps, some still containing highly reactive and caustic materials, including large heaps of galligu, a by-product of the LeBlanc process used at the James Muspratt alkali works at Flint.

The Dee estuary also supported industries concerned with the synthesis of PCBs and some pharmaceuticals and was also home to several industrial waste oil-reclamation industries.

As a consequence of its industrial heritage, there are extensive areas of contaminated ground along the shores of the estuary.

The estuary also plays a part in the most modern of industries as it provides the first stage of transport of Airbus A380 wings on their way to Toulouse via barge to Mostyn docks.
