= Neston High School =

British secondary school

Location
- Raby Park Road; Neston, Cheshire, CH64 9NH; England
- Coordinates: 53.29669°N 3.05514°W

Information
- Type: Academy
- Department for Education URN: 138318 Tables
- Ofsted: Reports
- Headteacher: Kirsty Cunningham.
- Gender: Coeducational
- Age: 11 to 18
- Enrolment: 1665 as of May 2013
- Capacity: 1750
- Website: nestonhigh.com

Neston High School is a coeducational secondary school and sixth form with academy status located in Neston on the Wirral Peninsula, in the English county of Cheshire.

Previously a community school administered by Cheshire West and Chester Council, Neston High School converted to academy status in July 2012. The school continues to coordinate with Cheshire West and Chester Council for admissions.

== Description ==
The school was opened as Neston Secondary School in 1958, in purpose-built buildings. Planning for the new school had started in 1950. The cost of the new school was £117,000. It was opened by Selwyn Lloyd. In his speech, he said that the new school "was one more step in carrying out the revolutionary promises of the Education Act of 1944". The first headteacher was Robert Hird, and the school opened with 320 pupils, with space for 360. In 1968 improvements were made to the school buildings to prepare for the raising of the school leaving age to 16. Hird remained head until 1979, when Geoffrey Sirett was appointed. From 1972, following the abolition of the eleven-plus, children in the local catchment area were automatically allocated a place at Neston, now called Neston Comprehensive School.

Neston High School converted to academy status in July 2012. it was tested by Ofsted in 2013 and designated a Good school.

In 2016 the school gained two national awards as part of the National Good Schools Guide scheme. The school was rated 'Good' overall by an Ofsted inspection in January 2017.

The school moved into new modern buildings in September 2017, built on the other side of Neston Recreation Centre to the original building. The original building has now been demolished and all-weather pitches have been installed along with a car-park and school drop off point. The school project cost £25m: the leisure centre refurbishment £2.2m.

== Buildings ==
The new buildings, completed in 2017, were a result of the Priority School Building Programme which took over where Building Schools for the Future had left off. The contractors were Morgan Sindall. It is a large three storey rectangle, with two three storey light wells at its heart. The classrooms, laboratories and workshops all face outwards and benefit from natural light. The new building provides an ICT rich library area, a learning resource centre and a Sixth Form Study area. As in every new build there are lettable areas. There are gyms and appropriate changing facilities.

== Academics ==
Neston operates an entitlement curriculum believing that students 'have a right to immerse themselves in studies that takes full account of their potential and capability.' The curriculum extends beyond the timetabled lessons, there are extensive 'Learning Outside The Classroom' (LOTC) programmes. In 2012 Ofsted published a research paper using Neston as the example of good practice. It remained current for four years.

Virtually all maintained schools and academies follow the National Curriculum, and are inspected by Ofsted on how well they succeed in delivering a 'broad and balanced curriculum'. Schools endeavour to get all students to achieve the English Baccalaureate (EBACC) qualification- this must include core subjects a modern or ancient foreign language, and either History or Geography.

Neston operates a three-year, Key Stage 3 where all the core National Curriculum subjects are taught. Each fortnight, years 8 9, study English (7 sessions), Maths (8), Science (6), PE (4), PRSE/RE (2). In addition they study Spanish (3), French (4) or German (4), RS, Art, Music, Drama, Technology and Computing. In year 7, there is food tech but only one language.

In Key Stage 4 all students study English (8), Maths (8), Science (10), PE (2), PSRE/RE (2) and four options (5 sessions each). One of the options must be History or Geography. Neston High School offers GCSEs and Cambridge Nationals. Students in the sixth form have the option to study from a range of A-levels and BTECs.

== Houses ==
The school has five Houses named for various contributors to the school. Members of each house are identified by different coloured stripes on the school tie from years 7 to 11.

Grenfell – named after Sir Wilfred Grenfell, a missionary doctor from Parkgate who worked in Canada.

Stewart – named after Mike Stewart, a young Science teacher at the school who died suddenly.

Talbot – named after the Talbot family and Earl of Shrewsbury, who were landowners in Neston in medieval times.

Summers – named after local landowners who at one time owned Shotton Steel Works.

Overton – named after the first Chair of Governors, Colonel Overton.

== Pastoral ==
The pastoral system in Key Stage 3 and Key Stage 4 is based on the house model. In addition to the inevitable sports competitions, the Head of House oversees a team of form teachers whose job is to monitor the pupils progress and wellbeing. The house has its own dedicated learning support assistants and runs its own mentoring programme. Students are involved as e-buddies, mentors and sports captains. Each house sponsors a charity that is selected by the students.

The houses are Grenfell, named after Sir Wilfred Grenfell who was a doctor and Medical Missionary, Overton who was the first Chair of Governors, Stewart named after Mike Stewart, a science teacher who died young and suddenly, Summers who built the Shotton steel works and Talbot the family name of the Earls of Shrewsbury.

Bushell House (retired) Bushell house was named after Christopher Bushell (1811 - 1887) Christopher Bushell was a Liverpool wine merchant, Bushell took great interest in Neston and gave generously including for the building of local schools and churches. This is the same person Bushell fountain in the town center was named after.

== Notable former pupils ==
- Simon Byrne, Chief Constable, Police Service of Northern Ireland, 2019.
