= Neston =

Town and civil parish in Cheshire, England

Coordinates: 53.289°N 3.074°W

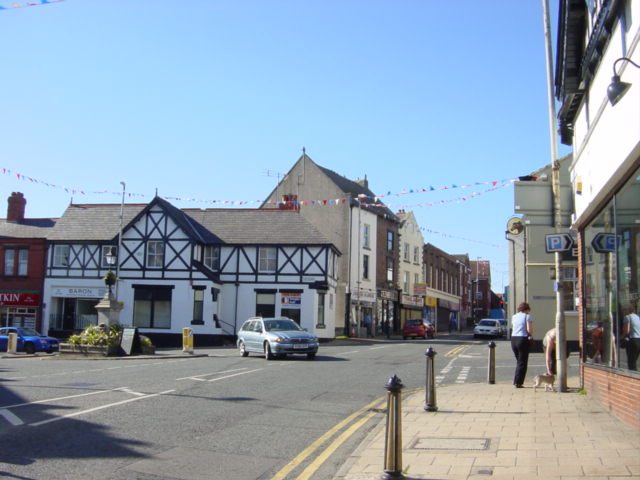
- The Cross, Neston Town Centre

- Location within Cheshire
- Population: 15,392 (Parish, 2021); 14,960 (Built up area, 2021)
- OS grid reference: SJ285775
  - London: 175 mi (282 km) SE
- Civil parish: Neston
- Unitary authority: Cheshire West and Chester
- Ceremonial county: Cheshire
- Region: North West
- Country: England
- Sovereign state: United Kingdom
- Post town: NESTON
- Postcode district: CH64
- Dialling code: 0151
- Police: Cheshire
- Fire: Cheshire
- Ambulance: North West
- UK Parliament: Chester North and Neston

Neston is a market town and civil parish on the Wirral Peninsula, England. It is part of the unitary authority of Cheshire West and Chester within the county of Cheshire. Its built-up area includes the nearby villages of Parkgate to the north-west, and Little Neston and Ness to the south according to the Office for National Statistics. At the 2021 census, the parish population was 15,392 whilst that of the immediate built-up area was 14,960.

== Toponymy ==
The town's name is of Viking origin, derived from the Old Norse Nes-tún, meaning 'farmstead or settlement at/near a promontory or headland'. Another Nesttun town can be found near Bergen, Norway.

It was also mentioned in the Domesday Book of 1086, as Nestone under the ownership of a William Fitznigel, with a population of eight households.

== History ==
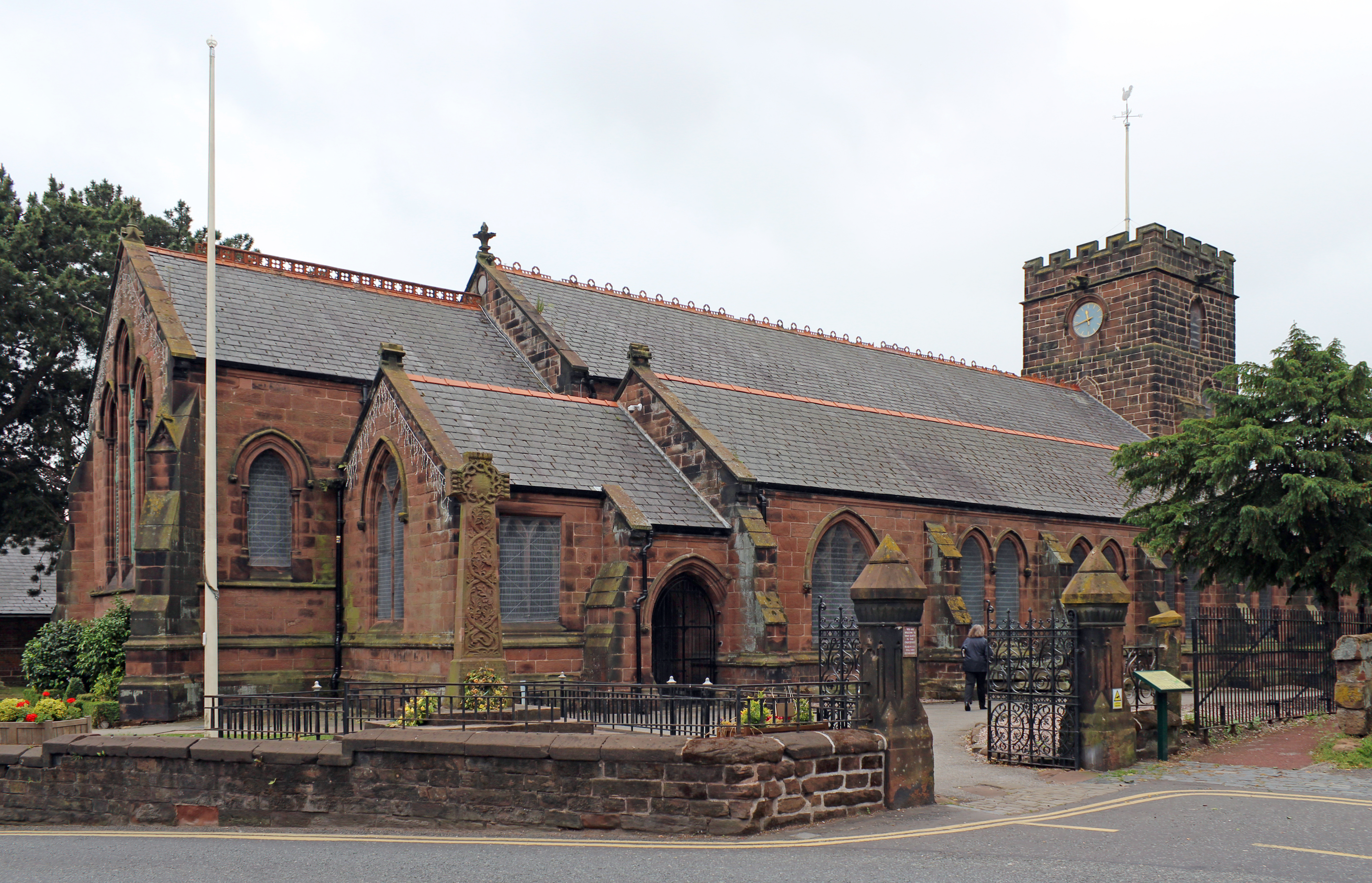
St Mary's and St Helen's Church

=== Architecture ===
Neston features over 75 buildings with Grade II and II* status, including many Georgian merchant houses, 17th-century sandstone barns and a 14th-century church, which was rebuilt in later centuries using its original materials with the addition of stained glass added by the pre-Raphaelite designer William Morris.

=== Maritime history ===
Neston was a major shipping port for the North West, serving as the main departure port for ships travelling to Ireland, Spain and France. During the 16th and 17th centuries, horse-drawn coaches transported upper-class travellers from across the country to Neston to embark on their trip. When the River Dee silted up, the port was relocated further downstream to the nearby village of Parkgate. However, by the early 19th century, most traffic had transferred to Liverpool.

=== Development ===
During the 18th century, Neston became fashionable with merchants and professionals, who settled in the area. Lady Emma Hamilton was born in the nearby village of Ness to a local blacksmith. Famously the mistress of Lord Nelson, she also became a muse for the painter George Romney.

British painter J. M. W. Turner stayed in Neston, during which time he was inspired by the sunsets on the Dee Estuary for his landscape paintings.

Neston was granted a market charter in 1728, permitting the town to hold weekly markets and annual fairs.

=== Colliery ===
Between 1759 and 1855, Ness Colliery operated at the southern edge of the town, as a small extension of the Flintshire Coalfield. Opened by John Stanley Massey, the mineshafts near the Harp Inn famously used underground canals beneath the Dee Estuary to transport coal. Rivalry and sabotage by the Stanley family eventually forced another mine out of business, before Ness Colliery itself closed in 1855 after exhausting many of the coal seams and finding difficulty in transporting coal.

In 1875, a second period of mining began, carried out by Neston Colliery (later Wirral Colliery). This operation exploited deeper northern seams and thrived by connecting directly to the newly built Chester and Birkenhead Railway network. Following a brief period of government control during the First World War, the colliery ultimately closed in 1927 because of increasing competition from other mines.

== Governance ==
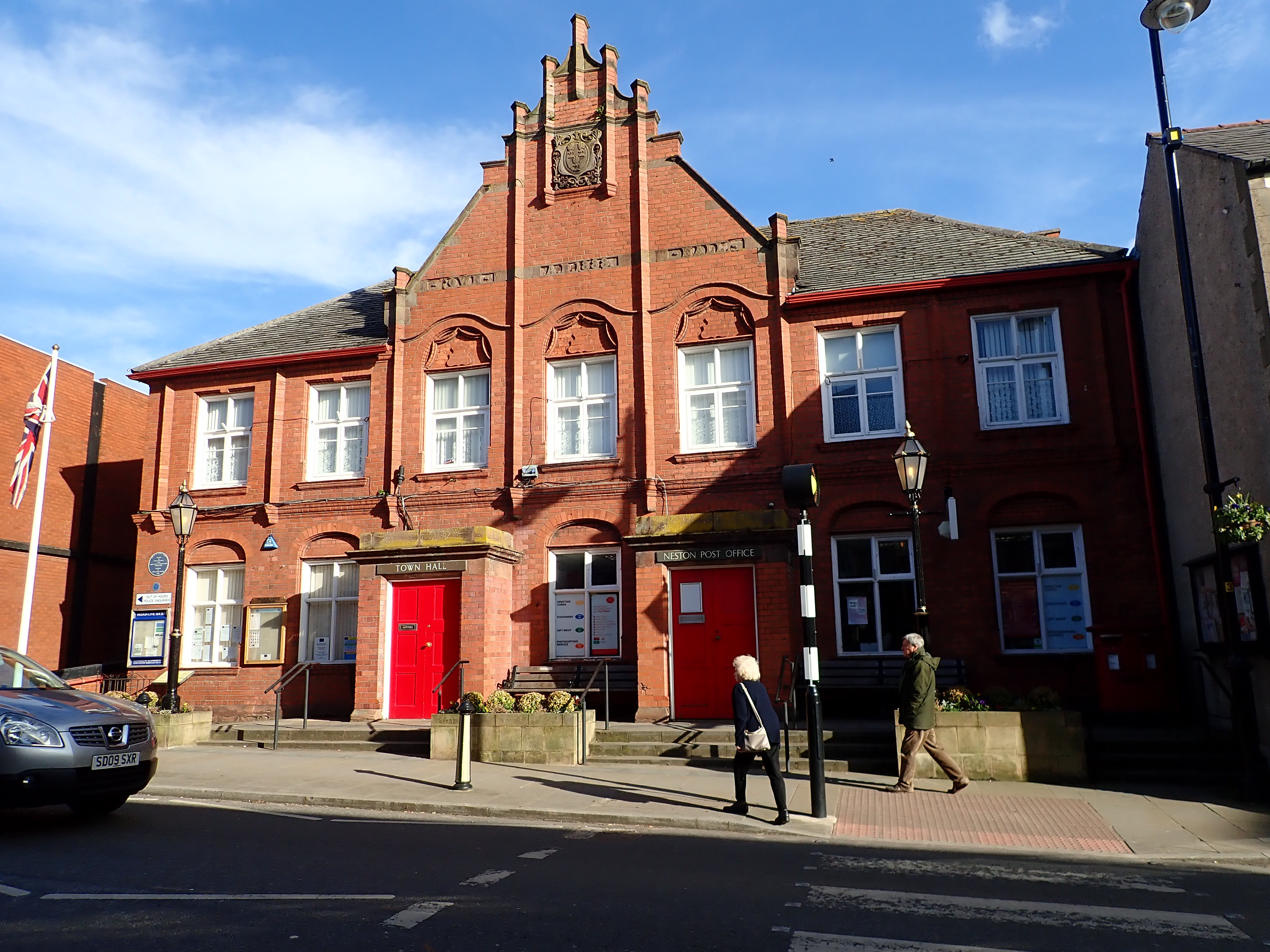
The town council is based at Neston Town Hall

There are two tiers of local government for Neston at both civil parish and unitary authority levels, carried out by Neston Town Council and Cheshire West and Chester Council respectively.

Neston forms part of the parliamentary constituency of Chester North and Neston.

=== Administrative history ===
Neston was an ancient parish in the Wirral Hundred of Cheshire. The parish was subdivided into eight townships: Great Neston, Ledsham, Leighton, Little Neston, Ness, Raby, Thornton Hough and Willaston, with the town of Neston and the parish church of St Mary's and St Helen's located in the Great Neston township. During the 17th century, parishes became responsible for multiple civil functions. In some cases, including Neston’s, functions were exercised by each township separately. In 1866, the surrounding townships also became civil parishes.

The local government district of Neston and Parkgate was created in 1867, covering the townships of Great Neston, Little Neston (Note: With the exception of three detached parcels of Little Neston township near Raby, which were subsequently transferred to Raby in the 1880s.) and Leighton. These became urban districts under the Local Government Act 1894. The Neston and Parkgate district and its parishes combined to become Neston-cum-Parkgate in 1894. By 1933, it included the parishes of Burton, Ness and Willaston, and was renamed Neston.

Neston Urban District was abolished in 1974, under local government reorganisation. Now part of Cheshire West and Chester Council, established in 2009.

== Geography ==
Neston lies at the southern end of the Wirral Peninsula, on the eastern bank of the Dee Estuary.

== Economy ==
=== Local area ===
Neston is a sought-after residential area with a selection of independent shops, cafés and bars. It is near to the historic village of Parkgate, and has immediate links to countryside walks such as the 'Wirral Way' of Wirral Country Park. One of the main local attractions is Ness Botanic Gardens, opened in 1898 and administered by the University of Liverpool.

A weekly market is held every Friday, offering fresh local produce including fruit and vegetables, meat, fish, cheese and baked and prepared goods.

On the first Thursday of June, the town celebrates Ladies' Day, a marching day that has links to the Neston Female Friendly Society during the Napoleonic War.

=== Market Town Initiative ===
From 2006, an assessment to attract more tourists and income to the town culminated in the creation of the Neston Market Town Initiative (NMTI). Following the launch of a new community website, the NMTI made improvements to the town centre's aesthetic, including new shop fronts, landscaping and a new supermarket on the site of Brook Street car park. Work for the Sainsbury's supermarket began in March 2009, with a full archaeological dig at the site, followed by the construction of a multi-storey car park in August 2009. The store was completed and opened on 1 December 2010.

A new town council website replaced the NMTI project pages after the initiative was completed in 2008.

== Sport ==
=== The Neston Club ===
The Neston Club offers both sporting and social facilities. It is home to Neston Cricket Club, who compete in the Cheshire County Cricket ECB Premier League, as well as Neston Hockey Club. Members of the club have access to specialised playing courts for tennis, squash, racquetball and bowls, alongside the clubhouse bar, function rooms and fitness suite, which offers classes including yoga and pilates.

=== Football clubs ===
Neston Nomads football club, established 1983, play their home games at the fields adjacent Neston High School that are part of the school premises. The first team currently play in the West Cheshire third division.

Parkgate Saint Germain football club, established 2020, play their home games at Ness village hall, in the Houlihan's Birkenhead Sunday League third division.

== Education ==
Neston is served by several local primary schools including Neston Primary School, Parkgate Primary School and Woodfall Primary School. Neston High School serves the local secondary age students.

== Demography ==
The 2001 census reported the local demography as:

Ethnic group	Percentage
White British	98.5%
White Irish	0.1%
White Other	0.5%
Mixed	0.2%
Asian	0.1%
Black	0.1%
Chinese	0.3%
Other	0.2%

The 2001 census reported the local population's religious beliefs as:

Religion	Percentage
Christianity	82.6%
No religion	10.7%
None specified	6.1%
Muslim	0.2%
Jewish	0.1%
Buddhism	0.2%
Sikh	0.1%
Other	0.1%

== Transport ==
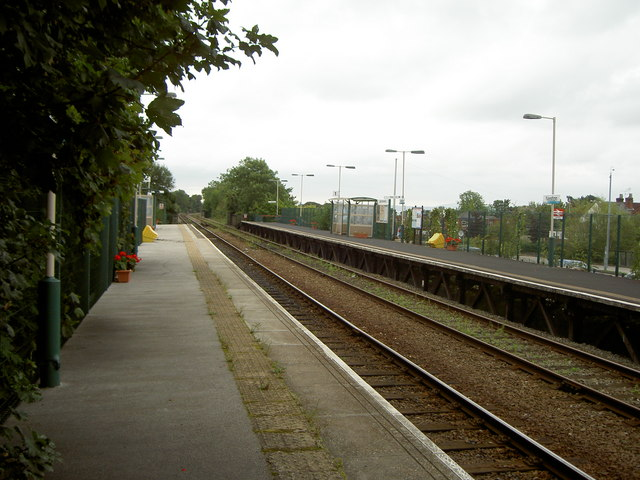
Neston railway station

The A540 road links Neston with Heswall and West Kirby to the north, and Chester and North Wales to the south. Neston is also within easy reach of both the M53 and M56 motorways, providing access to Liverpool, Manchester and the wider M6 motorway network

Neston railway station is on the Borderlands Line, with services operated by Transport for Wales. It offers direct services southbound to Wrexham Central and northbound to Bidston, enabling connections to the Wirral Line on the Merseyrail network between West Kirby and Liverpool Central.

Bus services are operated primarily by Arriva Merseyside, Stagecoach Merseyside and Al's Coaches; key routes connect the town with Liverpool, Heswall, Chester and West Kirby.

== Media ==
Local news and television programmes are provided by BBC North West and ITV Granada. Television signals are received from the Winter Hill TV transmitter. With its close proximity to North Wales, BBC Wales and ITV Cymru Wales can also be received from the Moel-y-Parc TV transmitter.

Local radio stations are BBC Radio Merseyside on 95.8 FM, Capital North West & Wales on 97.1 FM, Heart North West on 105.4 FM, Smooth Radio North West on 100.4 FM, and Dee Radio on 106.3 FM.

The town is served by the local newspapers Wirral News and Chester and District Standard.

== Notable residents ==
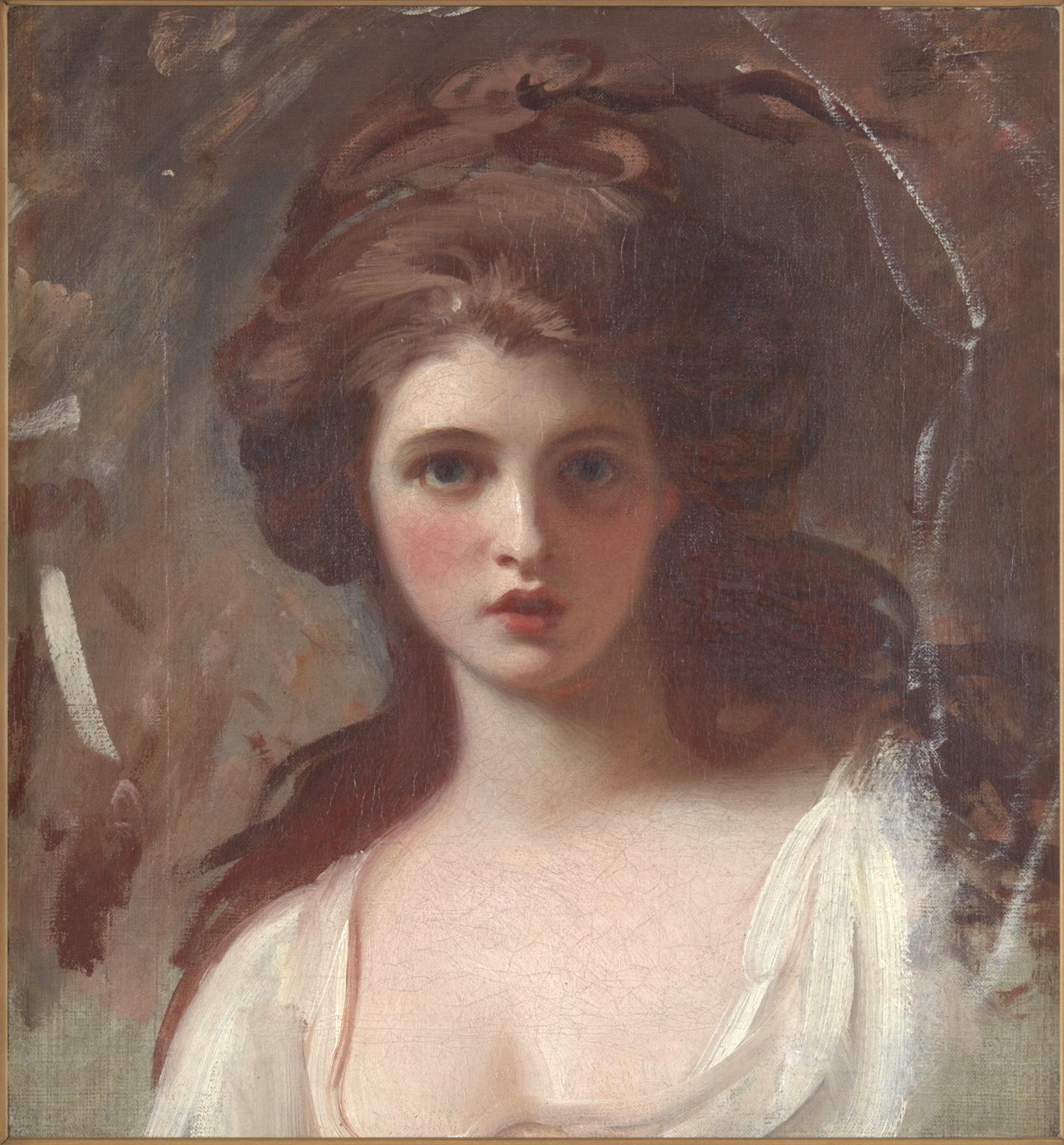
Emma, Lady Hamilton, by George Romney, 1782

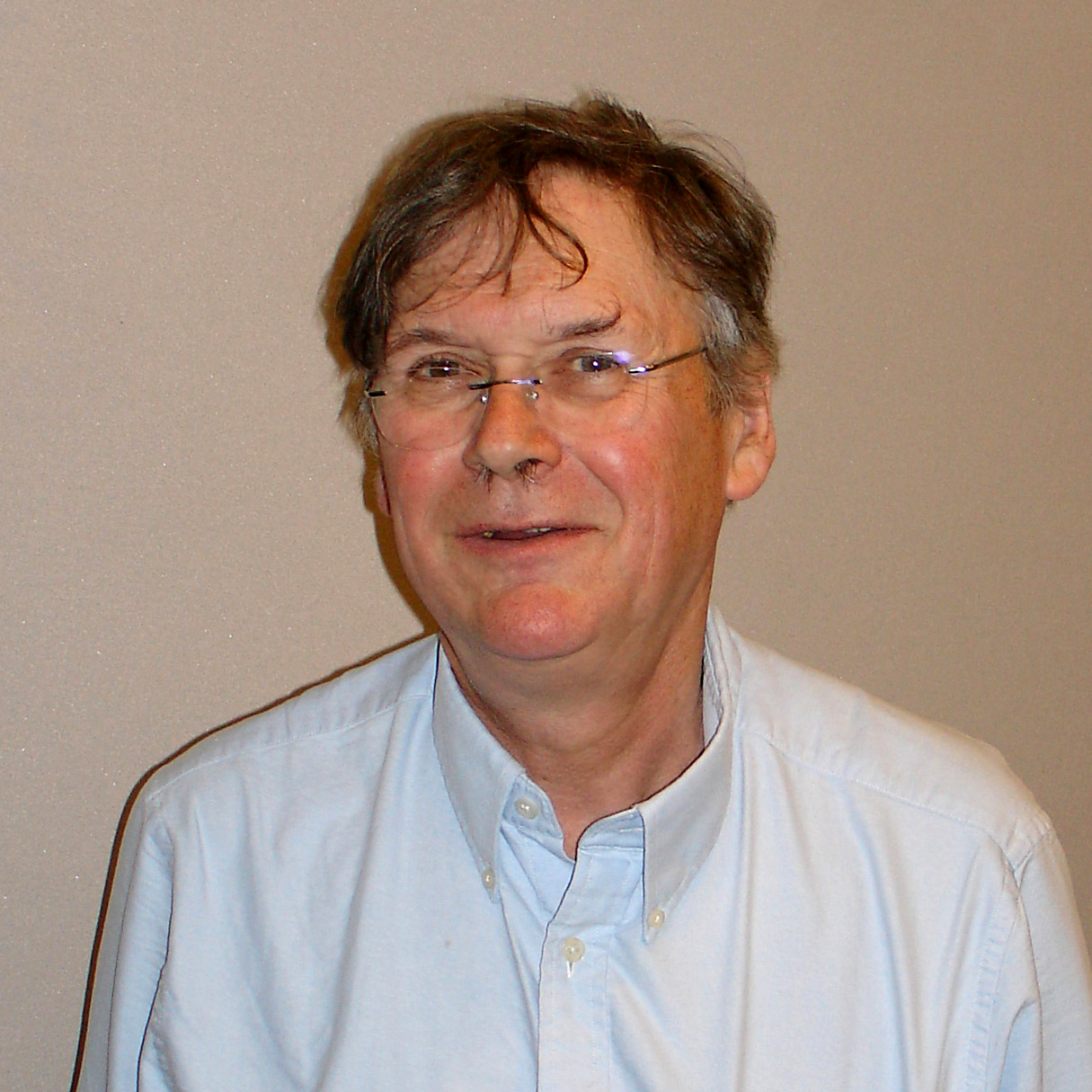
Tim Hunt, 2009

- Thomas Wilson (1663 in Burton and Ness – 1755), Bishop of Sodor and Man between 1697 and 1755; eponym of Bishop Wilson CE Primary School
- Emma, Lady Hamilton (1765 in Swan Cottage, Ness – 1815), model and actress, mistress of Lord Nelson and muse of the portrait artist George Romney, eponym of Romney Close and Way.
- Sir Wilfred Grenfell (1865 in Neston–1940), medical missionary to Newfoundland
- Lieutenant Colonel Christopher Bushell (1888 in Neston–1918 in Morlancourt, France), recipient of the Victoria Cross
- Billy Congreve (1891 in Neston – 1916 in Longueval, France), recipient of the Victoria Cross
- Rosalind Hill (1908 in Neston-cum-Parkgate – 1997), historian in ecclesiastical and medieval history
- George Ward Gunn (1912 in Neston – 1941 in Sidi Rezegh, Libya), recipient of the Victoria Cross, eponym of Gunn Grove
- Ralph Millington (1930 in Neston – 1999), footballer who played 357 games for Tranmere Rovers F.C.
- Sir Tim Hunt (born 1943 in Neston), biochemist and molecular physiologist, jointly awarded the 2001 Nobel Prize in Physiology or Medicine for discoveries about protein molecules
- Teresa Helena Higginson (1844–1905), Catholic mystic and teacher; her family lived in Neston, she stayed intermittently there and she was buried in the village churchyard.
- Patrick Wormald (1947 in Neston – 2004), historian and academic
- Cyril Edwards (1947 in Neston – 2019), medievalist, senior research fellow in German studies.

== See also ==
- Listed buildings in Neston
- St Mary's and St Helen's Church, Neston
