= Hadlow Road railway station =

Heritage railway station in Cheshire, England

Hadlow Road
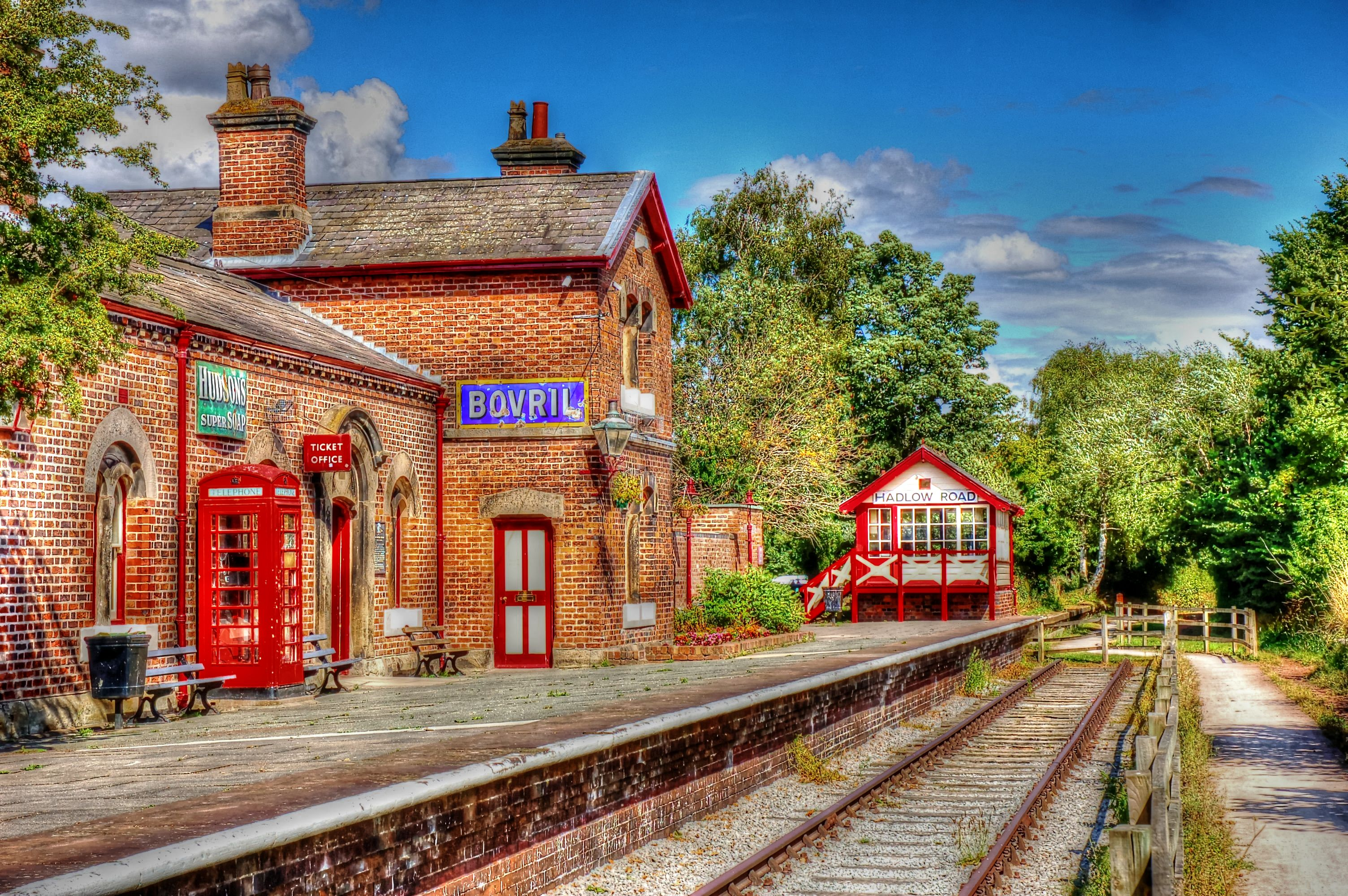
- The restored eastbound platform

General information
- Location: Willaston, Cheshire West and Chester, England
- Coordinates: 53.2884°N 3.0050°W
- Grid reference: SJ331773
- Platforms: 2

Other information
- Status: Disused

History
- Pre-grouping: Birkenhead Railway
- Post-grouping: Birkenhead Railway; London Midland Region of British Railways

Key dates
- 1 October 1866: Opened
- 17 September 1956: Closed to passenger services
- 7 May 1962: Closed to goods services
Location

Hadlow Road is a Grade II listed heritage railway station and museum in Willaston, on the Wirral Peninsula, in Cheshire, England. It was a station on the single tracked Hooton to West Kirby branch of the Birkenhead Railway between 1866 and 1962.

It has since been restored to have the look and feel of the time it was closed, with authentic facilities. The station is owned by Cheshire West and Chester Council; the Friends of Hadlow Road Station (FHRS) help to maintain and develop the station as a community resource. The former trackbed of the line has been converted to the Wirral Way rail trail.

== History ==
The Birkenhead Railway, owned jointly by the Great Western Railway (GWR) and London and North Western Railway (LNWR), opened a single-tracked branch line from Hooton to Parkgate on 1 October 1866; it included a station at Willaston with a passing place. An extension to West Kirby was completed twenty years later.

It was named Hadlow Road because another village called Willaston had already claimed the name for its own station by the time of Hadlow Road's opening.

The main station building is on the eastbound platform towards Hooton, whereas a smaller waiting shelter stands on the westbound platform towards West Kirby. At the western end of both platforms was a level crossing with rather large gates; this was due to the angle at which the road crossed the railway lines.

Hadlow Road was closed to passengers on 17 September 1956. The track continued to be used for goods and driver training for another six years, finally closing on 7 May 1962. The tracks were lifted two years later.

Preceding station	Disused railways	Following station
Hooton	Birkenhead Railway; Hooton to West Kirby branch	Neston South

== Wirral Country Park ==
The former trackbed became part of the Wirral Way rail trail and the Wirral Country Park in 1973, which was the first designated country park in Britain. It lies in both the Metropolitan Borough of Wirral and the borough of Cheshire West and Chester, which share responsibilities for the park's upkeep in their respective areas.

A second visitor centre is sited on the Wirral Way at Thurstaston; beside Thurstaston railway station's extant platforms.

== Museum ==
The station is now a museum that is open to the public; it has been preserved, excluding the westbound platform. There is a restored ticket office, telephone box, vintage signs and luggage carriers; a short section of track has been relaid by the FHRS in front of the eastbound platform.

The signal box and crossing gates are not the originals, having previously been located at Hassall Green on the North Staffordshire Railway. The station is recorded in the National Heritage List for England as a designated Grade II listed building. Car parking, a café, seating and public toilets are available.

== Friends of Hadlow Railway Station ==
The Friends of Hadlow Road Station, a community organisation, has helped to restore and maintain the site. FHRS has installed a model railway of the station, as it was in the 1950s, in the signal box, viewable from the signal box platform. There have been various plans to restore and upgrade the facilities; in 2018, it expressed interest in placing carriages at the station from which themed meals could be served.

The organisation won The King's Award for Voluntary Service for 2025.

== Gallery ==
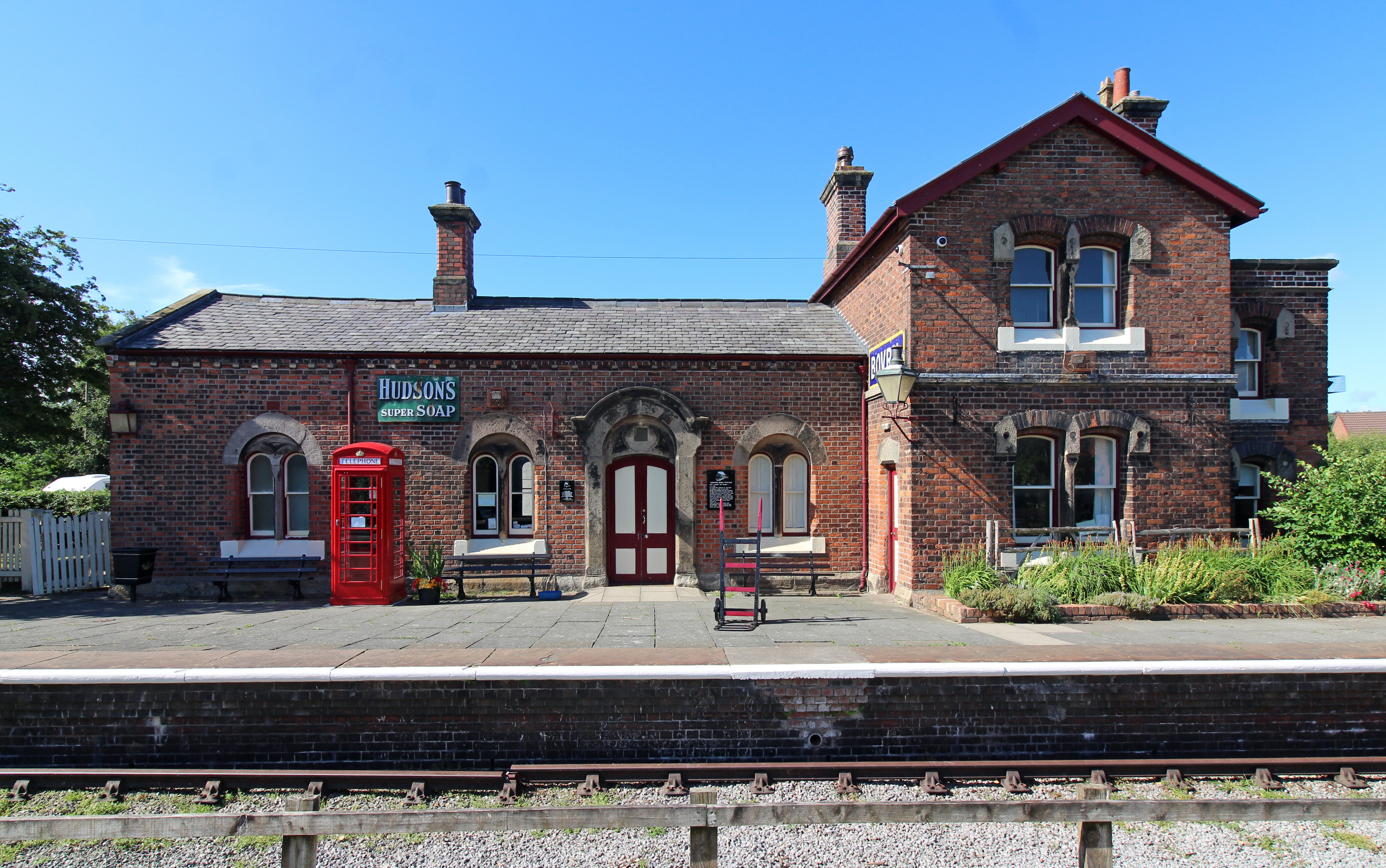
Ticket office and station master's house

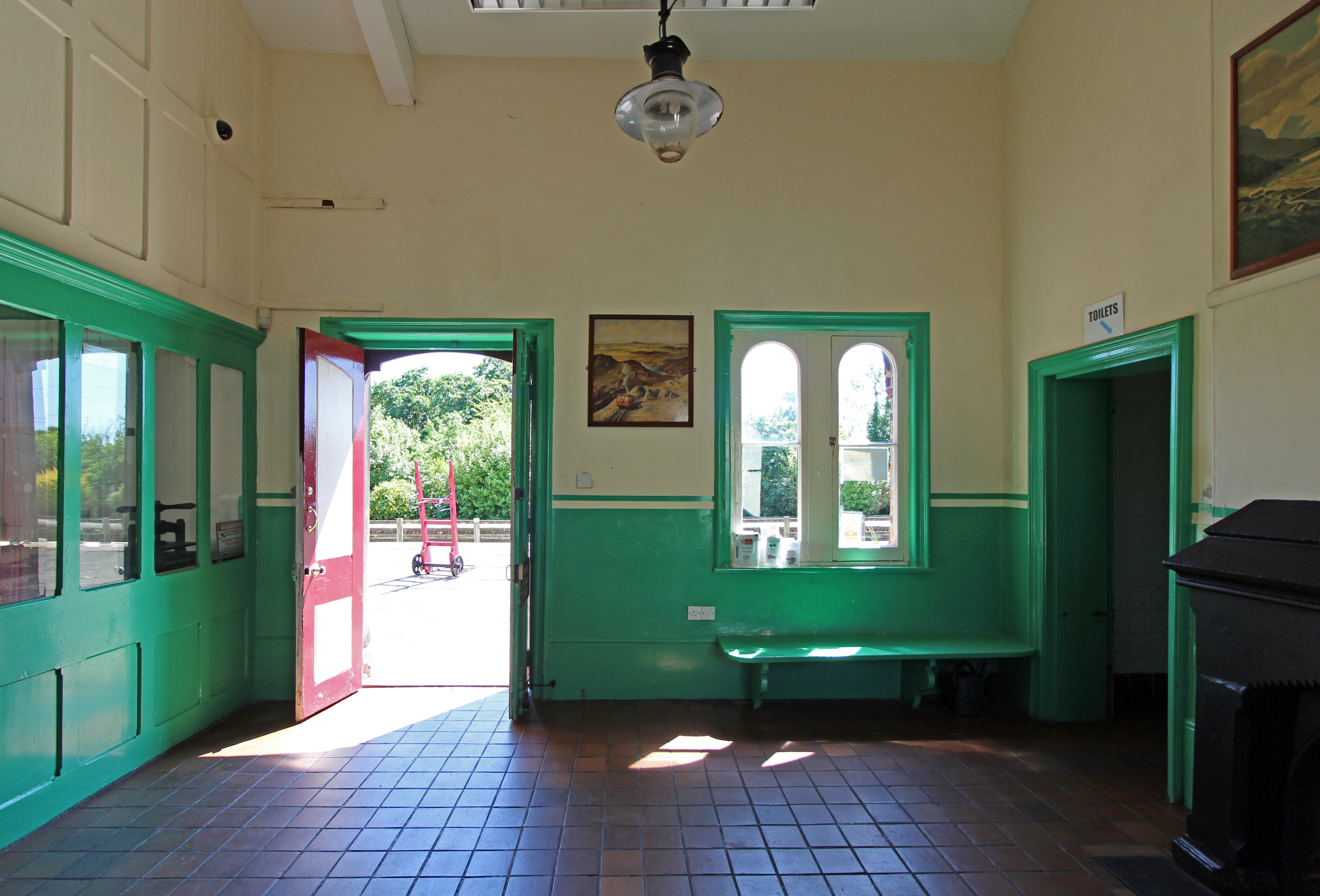
The ticket office (left) and waiting room

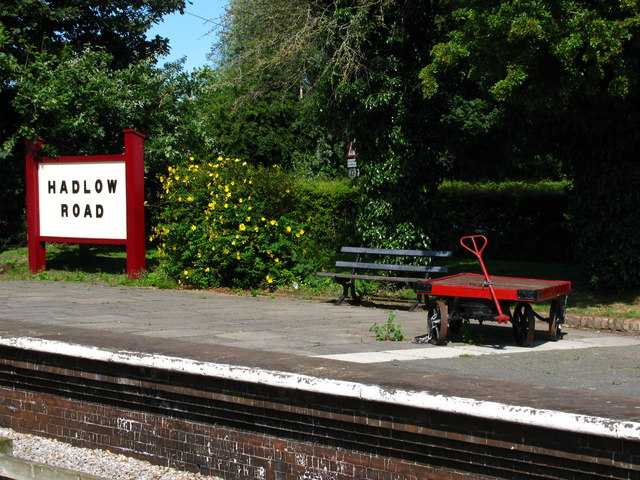
The platform with a luggage trolley

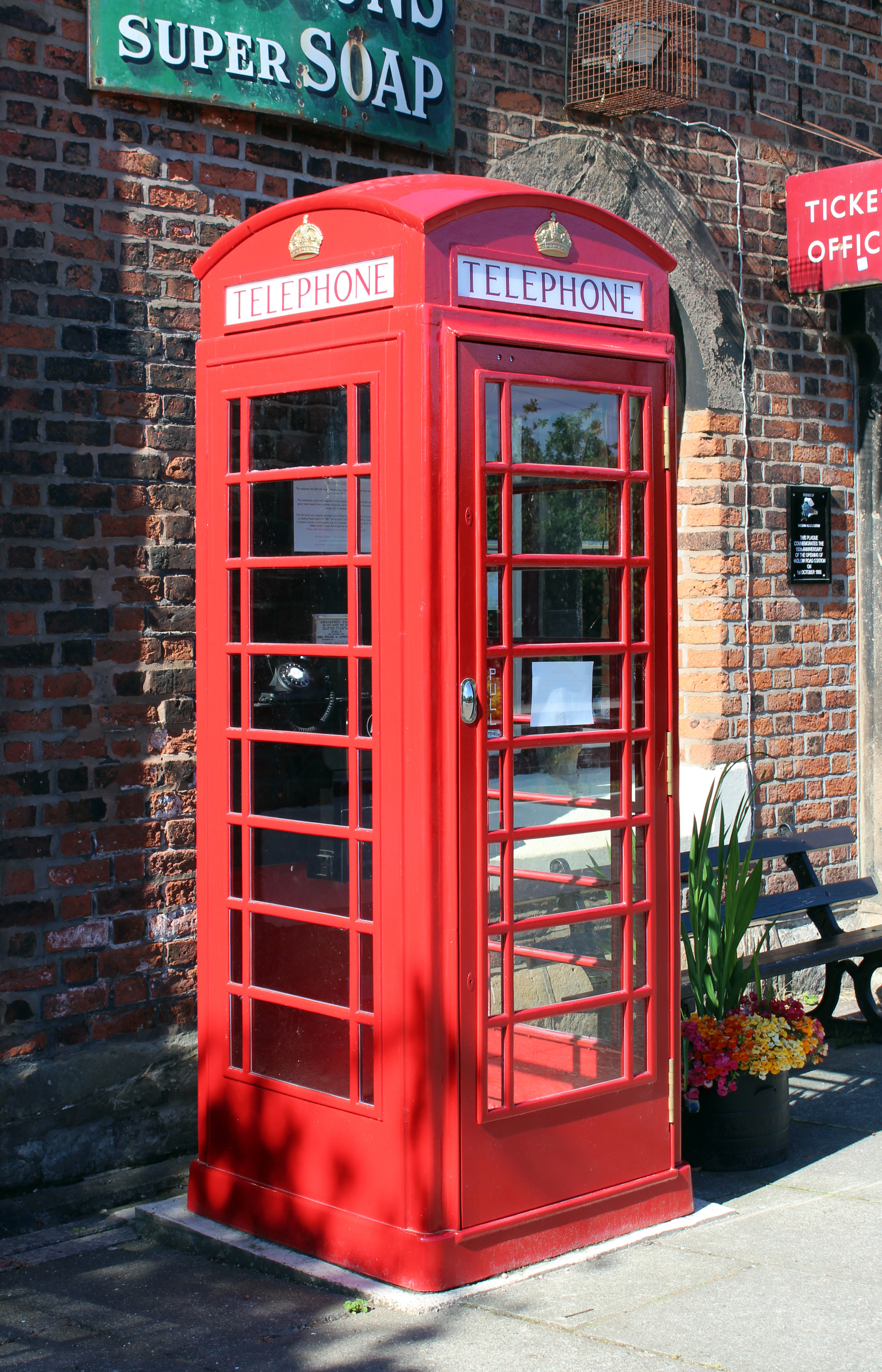
Preserved K6 phone box, with original telephone equipment with A/B push buttons

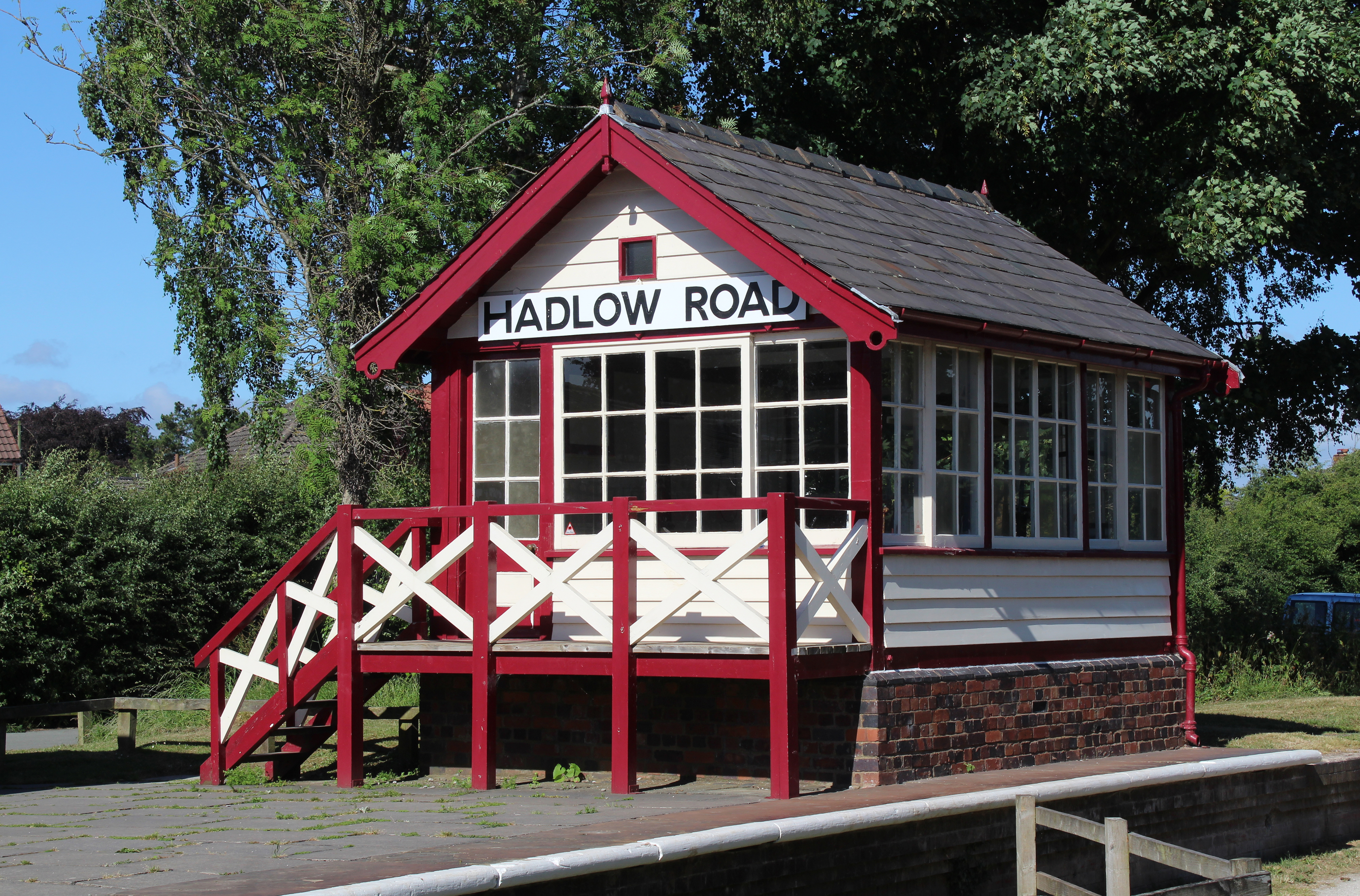
The signal box on the eastbound platform

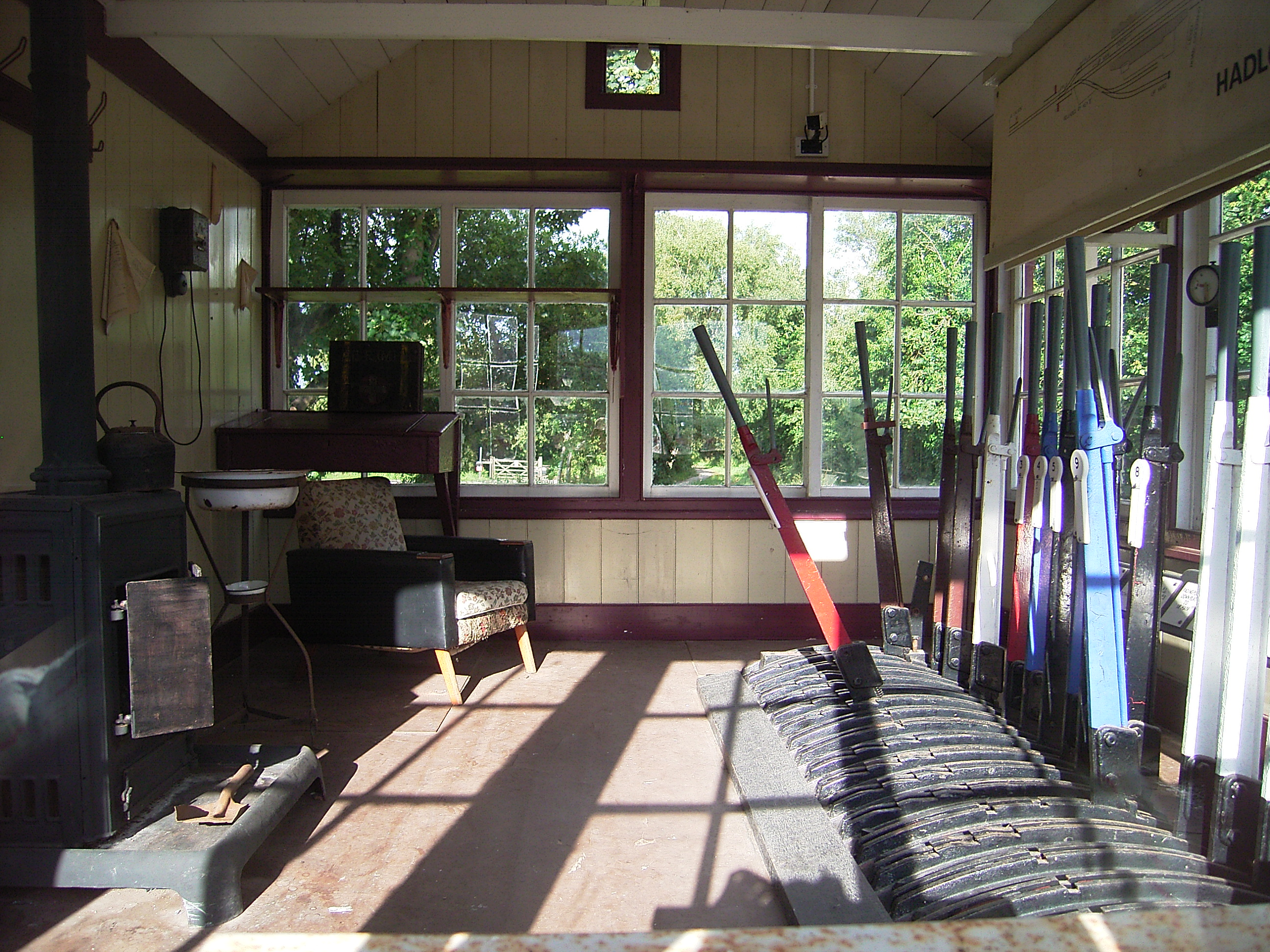
Signal box interior

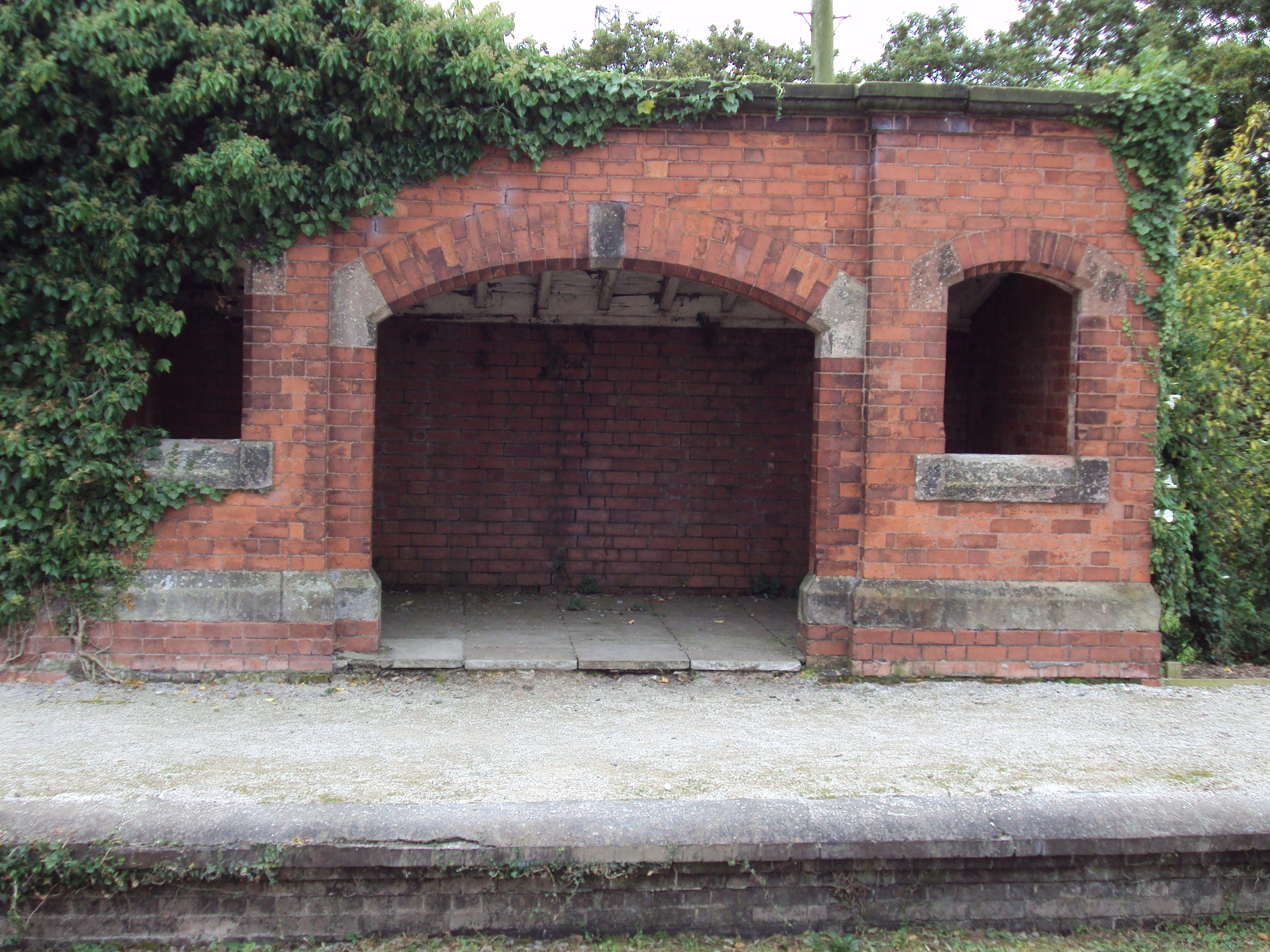
The shelter on the westbound platform.

== See also ==
- Listed buildings in Willaston, Cheshire West
- List of museums in Cheshire.
