= Caldy =

Village in the Wirral, England

Coordinates: 53.359°N 3.164°W

- Village
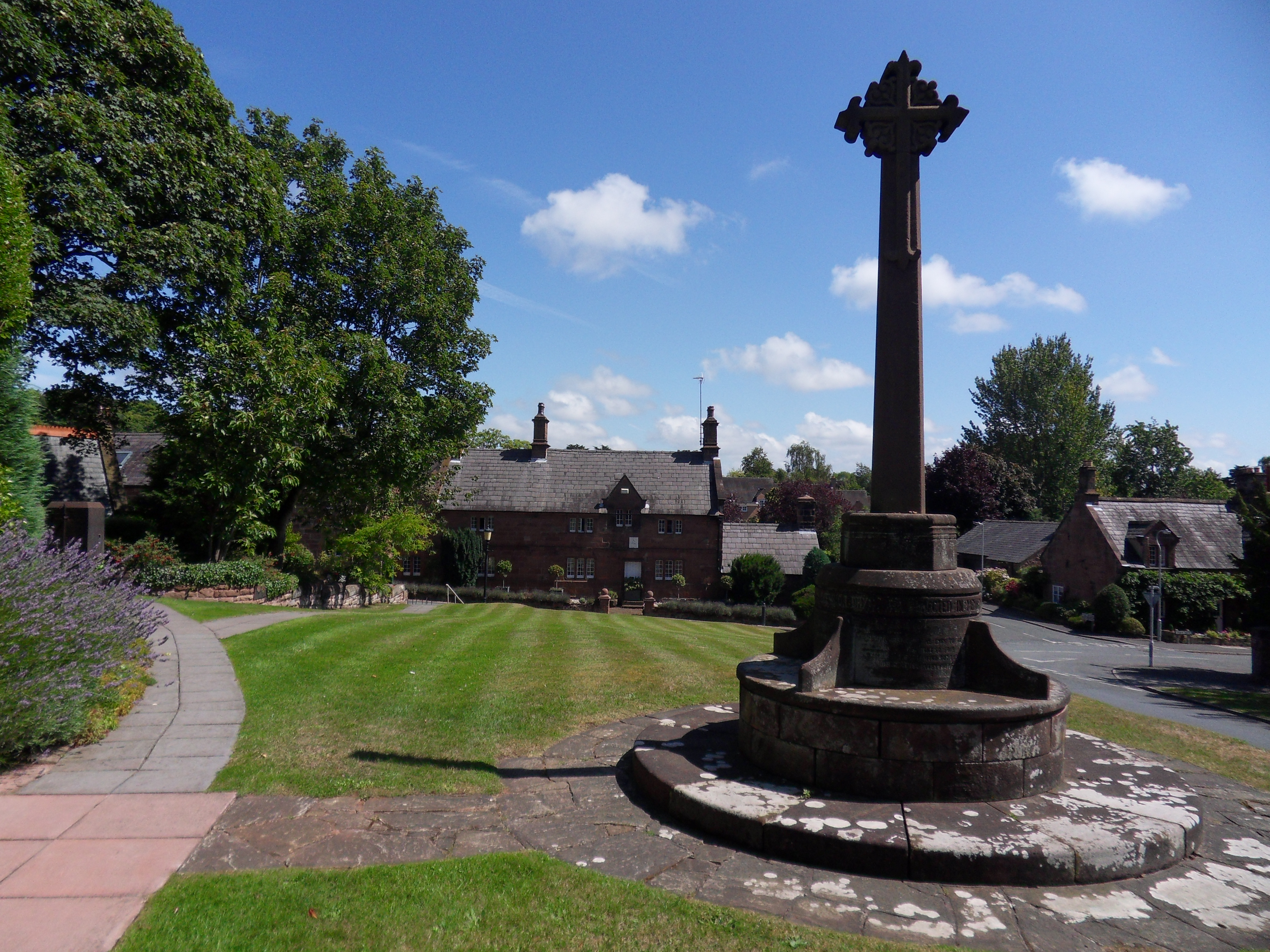
- The village green in Caldy

- Location within Merseyside
- Population: 1,290 (2001 Census)
- OS grid reference: SJ226854
  - London: 181 mi (291 km) SE
- Metropolitan borough: Wirral
- Metropolitan county: Merseyside
- Region: North West
- Country: England
- Sovereign state: United Kingdom
- Post town: WIRRAL
- Postcode district: CH48
- Dialling code: 0151
- ISO 3166 code: GB-WRL
- Police: Merseyside
- Fire: Merseyside
- Ambulance: North West
- UK Parliament: Wirral West

Caldy (historically spelt Calday) is a small village on the Wirral Peninsula, England. It is part of the Metropolitan Borough of Wirral in the county of Merseyside. Situated to the south-east of West Kirby, it is within the electoral Ward of West Kirby and Thurstaston and the parliamentary constituency of Wirral West. At the time of the 2001 Census, Caldy had 1,290 inhabitants, of a total ward population of 12,869.

== History and development ==
=== Early History ===
It was first mentioned in the Domesday Book in 1086 as being owned by Hugh of Mere and being named ‘Calders’. Nearby is a large area of National Trust land called Caldy Hill. Historically within Cheshire, Caldy was a township in the West Kirby parish of the Wirral Hundred. The population was 92 in 1801, 142 in 1851, 202 in 1901 and 607 in 1951. Many houses and walls in the village centre are built from local red sandstone.

=== Caldy Manor ===
Caldy Manor, a Grade II listed country house located near the village centre, dates back to the 17th Century when a much smaller farmhouse once occupied the site. Richard Watson Barton purchased the property and its accompanying 600 acres in the early 19th Century. After his death, the property was significantly extended into a Jacobean revival-style manor house by Barton’s eldest son Richard, who inherited the estate from his father. By the end of the 19th Century, the property was inherited by the younger of the Barton sons, Alfred, and later by Rev. E.A. Waller. In 1906 the estate was sold to Alexander Eccles, who commissioned further renovations to the sum of £40,000. The majority of the estate’s land was sold separately to The Caldy Manor Estates Company, founded by German-born David Benno Rappart ahead of his plans to develop Caldy into a desirable residential suburb. The land was subdivided into large plots and sold for the construction of individual residences and a golf course, subsequently attracting wealthy families and businessmen to Caldy. Today, the village remains notable for its wealth, with large private plots and low-density executive housing still de rigueur for the area.

Caldy Manor itself remained a privately-owned home before it was requisitioned and adapted as a heart hospital after World War II. In 1985, it was sold again, reopening as a retirement home which continues to operate today. Part of the manor house has also been converted into several private flats.

=== Administrative History ===
In 1866 Caldy became a separate civil parish. Between 1894 and 1933, it was part of Wirral Rural District, then subsequently Wirral Urban District. On 1 April 1974 the parish was abolished and local government reorganisation in England and Wales resulted in most of the Wirral Peninsula’s geographic area, including Caldy, transferring from the county of Cheshire to the then-newly-established Metropolitan County of Merseyside. Most of Caldy became a conservation area in 1974 to preserve the quiet residential character of the village.

Caldy railway station was on the Hooton to West Kirby branch of the Chester and Birkenhead Railway. The station closed in 1954 and the trackbed is now the 'Wirral Way' of Wirral Country Park.

== Geography ==
Caldy is on the western side of the Wirral Peninsula, on the eastern side of the Dee Estuary. The village is approximately 3.5 km (2.2 mi) south-south-east of the Irish Sea at Hoylake and about 11 km (6.8 mi) west-south-west of the River Mersey at Woodside. The centre of the village has an elevation of about 44 m (144 ft) above sea level.

== Education ==
Calday Grange Grammar School is between Caldy and West Kirby, with West Kirby Grammar School and Hilbre High School nearby.

== Sport ==
=== Caldy R.F.C. ===
Caldy Rugby Football Club, a rugby union club, play at Paton Field on Telegraph Road. The team currently compete in the Championship, the second tier of the rugby union pyramid in England.

=== Caldy Golf Club ===
Located at the end of Links Hey Road, Caldy Golf Club is home to an 18-hole championship golf course on the Dee Estuary coastline.

=== Caldy Cricket Club ===
Caldy Cricket Club also play at Paton Field in the summer months. They currently field four Saturday teams in the Liverpool and District Cricket Competition.

== Transport ==
=== Road ===
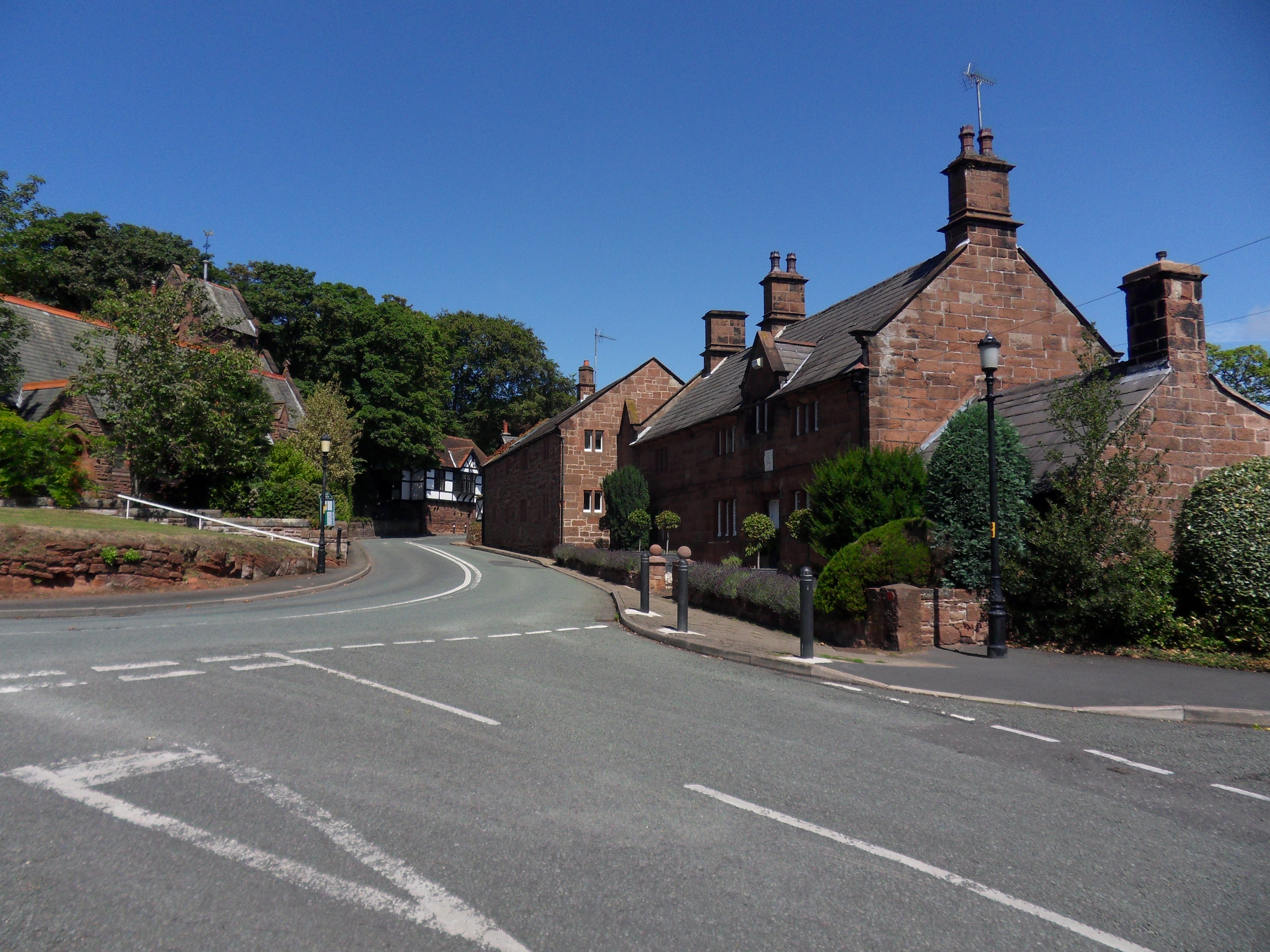
The B5140 Caldy Road at the junction with Croft Drive

Caldy is at the junction of the B5140 and B5141 roads, close to the A540 which runs from West Kirby to Chester. Both the M53 and M56 motorways are close by and provide access to Liverpool, Manchester and the wider M6 motorway.

=== Rail ===
The closest station is West Kirby station, which is on the Wirral Line of the Merseyrail network. It offers direct train services to Liverpool, enabling further nationwide connections.

The former Caldy railway station was closed in 1954.

== Notable residents ==
Caldy is noted for having many well-known residents, particularly those connected to professional football, namely Robbie Fowler and Rafael Benítez who once referred to "John the milkman" on the Wirral, while launching a cryptic attack on previous Liverpool club owner Tom Hicks and managing director Christian Purslow during a press conference.

Other famous football players who have lived in Caldy include Ian Rush and Jerzy Dudek.

The poet and novelist Malcolm Lowry lived in Caldy as a child, as did his brother, Wilfrid Lowry, the England rugby player.

Science-fiction author Olaf Stapledon lived in Caldy from 1940 until his death in 1950.

Sir Cyril Clarke KBE, FRCP, FRCOG, (Hon) FRC Path, FRS, physician, geneticist and lepidopterist, lived in Caldy for many years until his death in November 2000.

== See also ==
- Listed buildings in Hoylake

== Bibliography ==
- Mortimer, William Williams (1847). The History of the Hundred of Wirral. London: Whittaker & Co. pp270-273.
