= Heswall railway station (Birkenhead Railway) =

Former railway station in Merseyside, England

Heswall
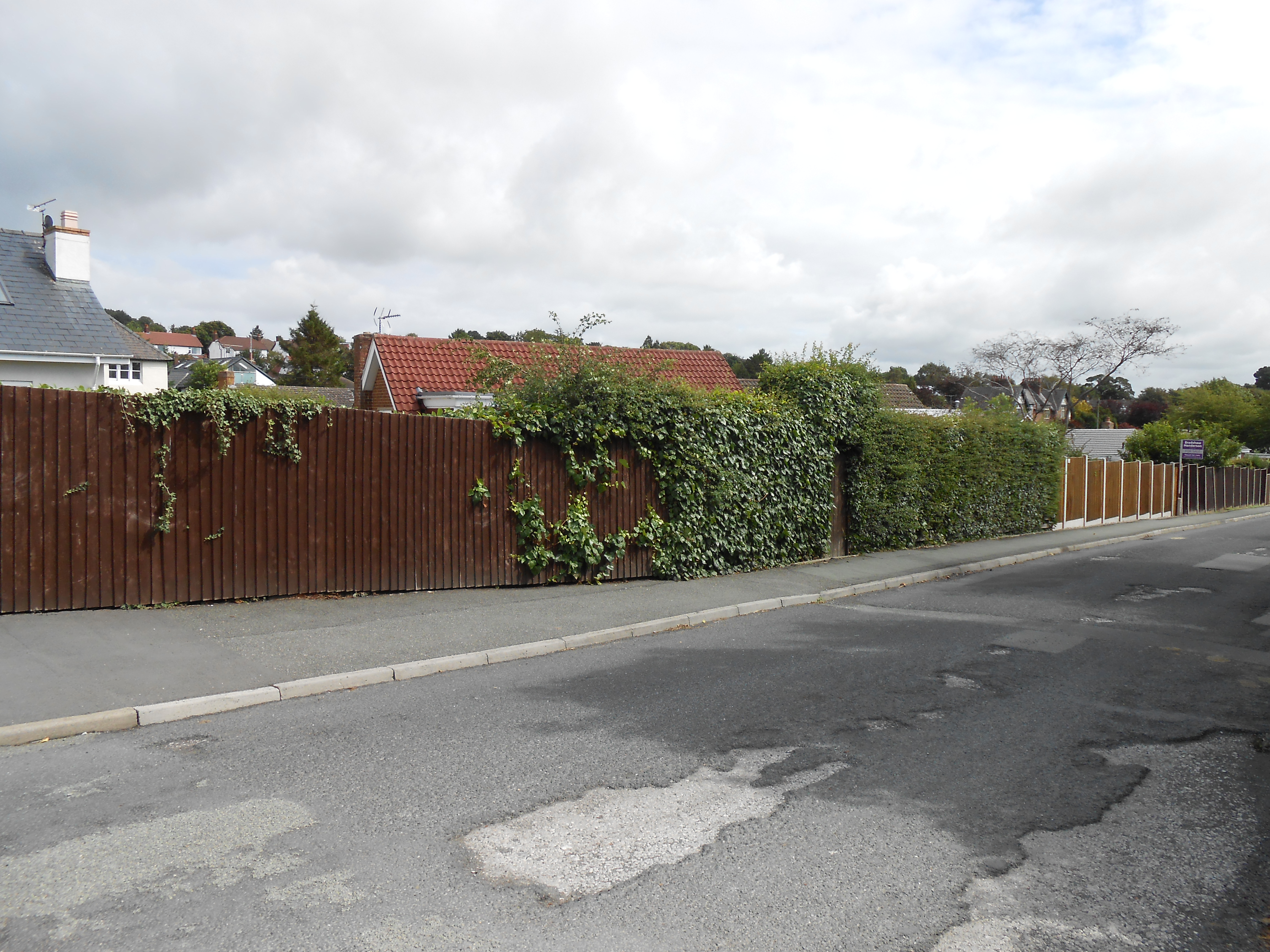
- The site of the station in 2013

General information
- Location: Heswall, Wirral; England
- Coordinates: 53.3195°N 3.1041°W
- Grid reference: SJ265808
- Platforms: 2

Other information
- Status: Disused

History
- Original company: Birkenhead Railway
- Pre-grouping: Birkenhead Railway
- Post-grouping: Birkenhead Railway; London Midland Region (British Railways)

Key dates
- 19 April 1886: Station opened
- 17 September 1956: Station closed
Location

Heswall railway station was a stop on the Birkenhead Railway route between Hooton and West Kirby. It served the town of Heswall, in Merseyside, England, between 1886 and 1956.

== History ==
This station opened on 19 April 1886, on the Birkenhead Railway's branch line from Hooton to West Kirby. This line passed through the western side of Heswall, alongside the River Dee. The station closed to passengers on 17 September 1956 and closed completely in 1962.

The site was razed and built over in the 1960s. The original station house was sold into private ownership in the early 1970s and then subsequently sold on for development.

| Preceding station | Disused railways | Following station |
|---|---|---|
| Parkgate; Line and station closed | Birkenhead Railway; Hooton to West Kirby Branch | Thurstaston; Line and station closed |

== The site today ==
The station site and the nearby trackbed continue to be occupied by housing. The length of the West Kirby-Hooton trackbed has been converted into the Wirral Way, a shared-use path; a short detour, marked by signage, is required to circumvent the site.

Part of the retaining wall that supported the booking office is extant, forming a property's garden wall.

The site is approximately 1.5 miles (2.4 km) south-west of the existing Heswall railway station, which is a stop on the Borderlands line linking Bidston with Wrexham Central.
