= Parkgate railway station =

Former railway station in Cheshire, England

Parkgate
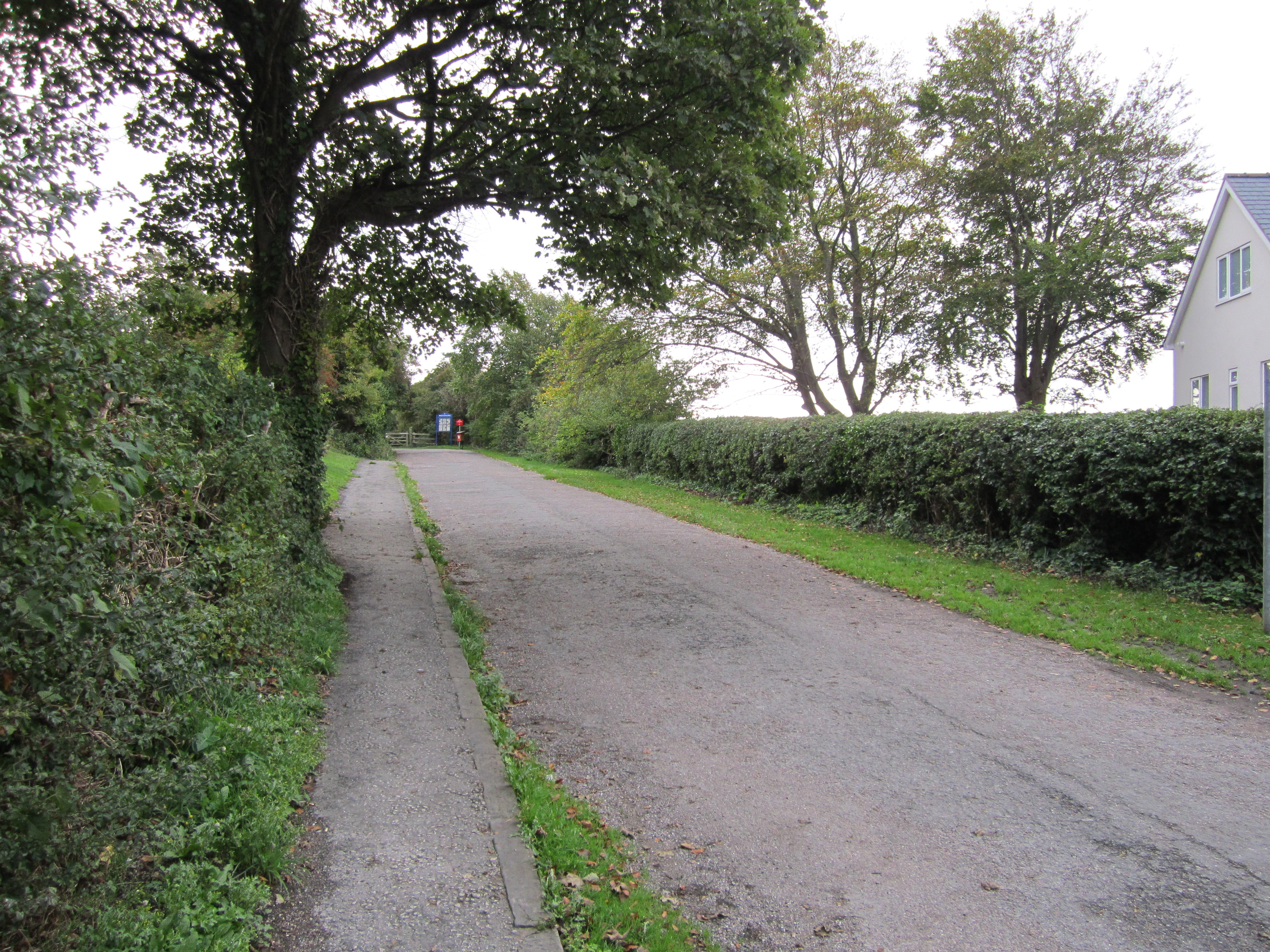
- The Wirral Way passes through the site of the former station (2013)

General information
- Location: Parkgate, Cheshire West and Chester, England
- Coordinates: 53.2944°N 3.07670°W
- Grid reference: SJ283781
- Platforms: 2

Other information
- Status: Disused

History
- Pre-grouping: Birkenhead Railway
- Post-grouping: Birkenhead Railway; London Midland Region of British Railways

Key dates
- 1 October 1866: First station opened
- 19 April 1886: Second station opened
- 17 September 1956: Closed to passengers
- 7 May 1962: Closed to goods
Location

Parkgate railway station served the village of Parkgate, on the Wirral Peninsula, in Cheshire, England. It was a stop on the single tracked Hooton to West Kirby branch of the Birkenhead Railway.

== Opening ==
The Birkenhead Railway, owned jointly by the Great Western Railway and London and North Western Railway, opened a branch line from Hooton to Parkgate on 1 October 1866. An extension to West Kirby was completed twenty years later. The original station at Parkgate was a temporary wooden structure, as a possible future extension to West Kirby had been taken into consideration. For this purpose, a second station was built which opened on 19 April 1886; the old buildings were retained as a goods yard.

Preceding station	Disused railways	Following station
Neston South	Birkenhead Railway; Hooton to West Kirby branch	Heswall

== Closure ==
Once motor transport reached the area, passenger numbers dwindled and the station was closed to passengers on 17 September 1956. The track continued to be used to transport goods and driver training for another six years, finally closing on 7 May 1962; it was lifted two years later. The station buildings have since been demolished.

== The site today ==
The station master's house remains as a private residence.

The former trackbed became part of the Wirral Way rail trail and the Wirral Country Park in 1973, which was the first such designated site in Britain.
