= Caldy railway station =

Disused railway station in England

Coordinates: 53.35613°N 3.17038°W

Caldy
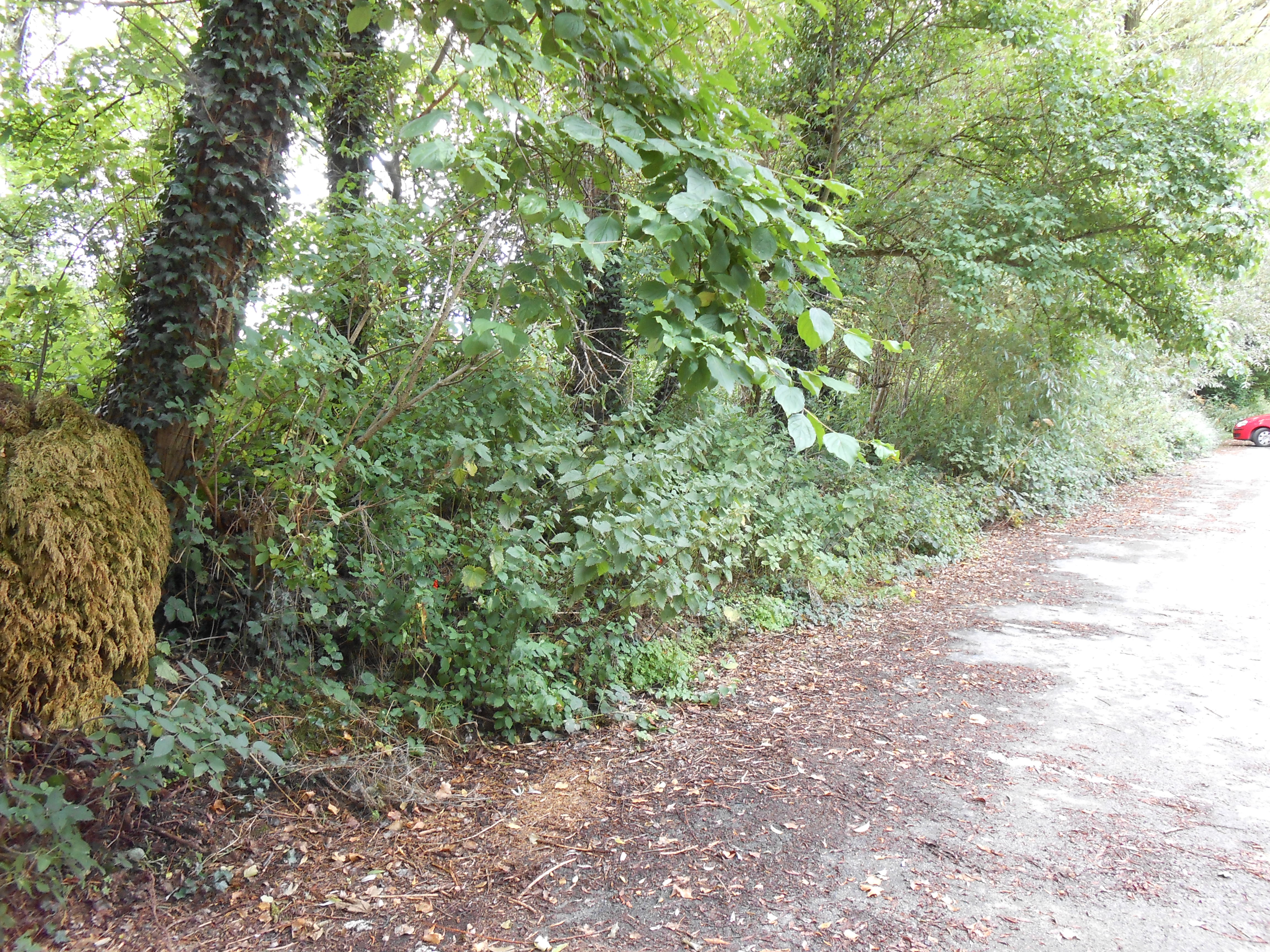
- The site of the station in 2013

General information
- Location: Caldy, Wirral; England
- Grid reference: SJ226852
- Platforms: 1

Other information
- Status: Disused

History
- Pre-grouping: Birkenhead Railway.
- Post-grouping: Birkenhead Railway; London Midland Region (British Railways)

Key dates
- 1 May 1909: Opened
- 1 February 1954: Closed to passengers
- 7 May 1962: Closed to freight
Location

Caldy railway station was a station on the single track Hooton to West Kirby branch of the Birkenhead Railway, on the Wirral Peninsula, England.

== History ==
The Birkenhead Railway, owned jointly by the Great Western Railway (GWR) and London and North Western Railway (LNWR), had initially opened a branch line from Hooton to Parkgate in 1866. An extension to West Kirby was completed twenty years later although Caldy station did not open until 1 May 1909.

The station was located to the west of the village of Caldy and situated on top of a high embankment. This was due to a local landowner objecting to the original intended course of the line; which resulted in the station being much closer to the coast of the River Dee than was planned. The site consisted of a single platform on a single track section of the line. The station building was constructed from corrugated iron and consisted of a ticket office, waiting room and male & female toilets.

=== Closure ===
On 1 February 1954 the station was closed to passengers, although the line itself remained open to passenger trains for another two years. The track continued to be used for freight transportation and driver training for another eight years, closing on 7 May 1962. The line was lifted two years later with the station building and platform completely demolished.

=== Wirral Country Park ===
The route became the Wirral Way footpath and part of Wirral Country Park in 1973, which was the first such designated site in Britain.

Preceding station	Disused railways	Following station
Thurstaston	Birkenhead Railway; Hooton to West Kirby branch	Kirby Park
