= Neston South railway station =

Former railway station in Cheshire, England

Neston South
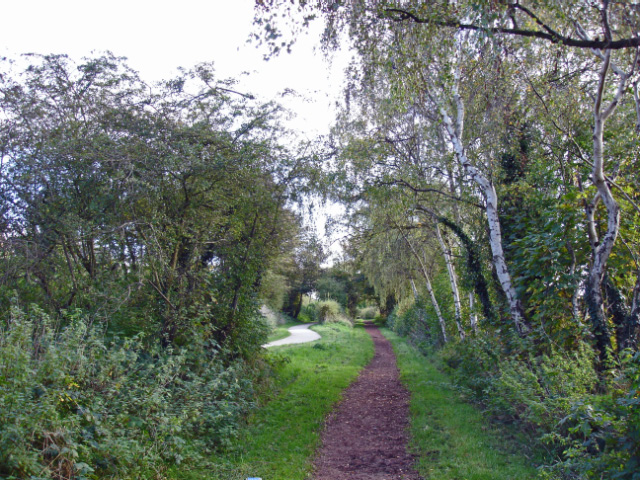
- Approaching the former site of the station; the trackbed now forms part of the Wirral Way.

General information
- Location: Neston, Cheshire West & Chester, England
- Coordinates: 53.2879°N 3.0561°W
- Grid reference: SJ297773
- Platforms: 2

Other information
- Status: Disused

History
- Pre-grouping: Birkenhead Railway
- Post-grouping: Birkenhead Railway; London Midland Region of British Railways

Key dates
- 1 October 1866: Station opened as Neston
- 15 September 1952: Station renamed Neston South
- 17 September 1956: Closed to passengers
- 7 May 1962: Closed to freight
Location

Neston South was one of two railway stations that served the town of Neston, on the Wirral Peninsula, in Cheshire, England. It was a stop on the single tracked Hooton to West Kirby branch of the Birkenhead Railway between 1866 and 1956.

== Opening ==
The Birkenhead Railway, owned jointly by the Great Western Railway (GWR) and London and North Western Railway (LNWR), opened a branch line from Hooton to Parkgate on 1 October 1866; this was to serve the colliery near Neston, and the residential area and bathing resort of Parkgate. The railway was extended to West Kirby in 1886.

== Name and location ==
From its opening in 1866 until 1952, it was known as Neston. Consisting of brick station buildings and two platforms, it was situated 0.5 miles (0.8 km) south-east of Neston North station, now Neston. A factor which affected Neston South during its existence was being sited some distance away from the town centre, which was due to a dispute between the railway company and the local landowner the Earl of Shrewsbury.

== Closure ==
The station was closed to passengers on 17 September 1956. The track continued to be used to transport goods and driver training for another six years, closing on 7 May 1962; it was lifted two years later.

== The site today ==
The station buildings and platforms were demolished and the site was redeveloped for housing.

The former trackbed became part of the Wirral Way rail trail and the Wirral Country Park in 1973, which was the first such designated site in Britain.
