= Birkenhead Railway =

Former railway company in the UK

Overview
- Locale: Cheshire; Merseyside
- Successor: British Railways

Technical
- Track gauge: 4 ft 8 1/2 in (1,435 mm) standard gauge
Route map
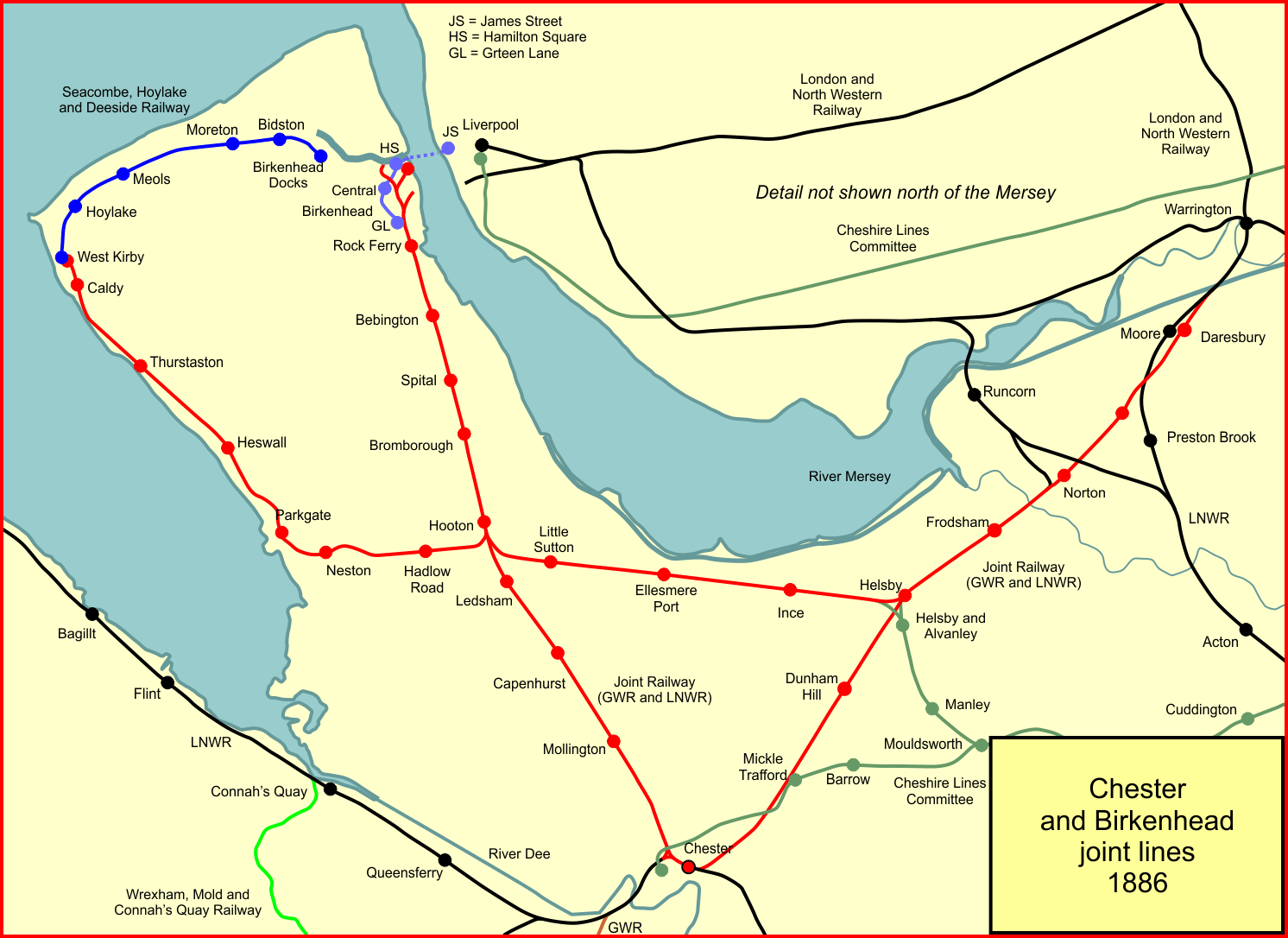

The Birkenhead Railway was a railway company in North West England. It was incorporated as the Birkenhead, Lancashire and Cheshire Junction Railway (BL&CJR) in 1846 to build a line connecting the port of Birkenhead and the city of Chester with the manufacturing districts of Lancashire by making a junction near Warrington with the Grand Junction Railway. The BL&CJR took over the Chester and Birkenhead Railway in 1847, keeping its own name for the combined company until it shortened its name to the Birkenhead Railway in 1859. It was taken over jointly, on 1 January 1860, by the London and North Western Railway (LNWR) and the Great Western Railway (GWR). It remained a joint railway until nationalisation of the railways in 1948.

Apart from the Hooton–West Kirby line which closed in 1962 almost the whole BL&CJR network is still in mainline use. Part of the railway is now used by the Chester branch of the Wirral Line, one of the two urban electric commuter rail services operated by Merseyrail on Merseyside.

== History ==
=== Early history ===
Birkenhead, Lancashire and Cheshire Junction Railway Act 1846
- Act of Parliament
- Parliament of the United Kingdom
- Long title: An Act for making a Railway from the Chester and Birkenhead Railway to the Manchester and Birmingham Railway, with Branches therefrom, to be called "The Birkenhead, Lancashire, and Cheshire Junction Railway."
- Citation: 9 & 10 Vict. c. xci

Dates
- Royal assent: 26 June 1846

Other legislation
- Repealed by: Birkenhead, Lancashire and Cheshire Junction Railway Act 1852

Status: Repealed

Interests in the Birkenhead docks were aware that they needed a railway connection towards Manchester and the Lancashire manufacturing districts, to enable them to compete with the Port of Liverpool, served by the busy Liverpool and Manchester Railway (L&MR). The Birkenhead, Lancashire and Cheshire Junction Railway was incorporated by the Birkenhead, Lancashire and Cheshire Junction Railway Act 1846 (9 & 10 Vict. c. xci) on 26 June 1846 with capital of £1,500,000, to build a line from Chester to Walton Junction, near Warrington, where it would connect with the Grand Junction Railway (GJR), leading to Manchester. The London and North Western Railway (LNWR) was formed by merging the GJR, the L&MR, and others on 16 July 1846. This left the BL&CJR out on its own, and its attempts to negotiate for access at Warrington and beyond were frustrated for some time.

=== Acquisition of the Chester and Birkenhead Railway ===
Birkenhead, Lancashire and Cheshire Junction Railway and Chester and Birkenhead Railway Amalgamation Act 1847
- Act of Parliament
- Parliament of the United Kingdom
- Long title: An Act to incorporate the Chester and Birkenhead Railway with the Birkenhead, Lancashire, and Cheshire Junction Railway.
- Citation: 10 & 11 Vict. c. ccxxii

Dates
- Royal assent: 22 July 1847

Other legislation
- Repealed by: Birkenhead, Lancashire and Cheshire Junction Railway Act 1852

Status: Repealed

Text of statute as originally enacted

In late 1846 negotiations for a merger of the Chester and Birkenhead Railway and the Birkenhead, Lancashire and Cheshire Junction Railway were finalising. A parliamentary bill authorising the merger was submitted, and it was passed as the Birkenhead, Lancashire and Cheshire Junction Railway and Chester and Birkenhead Railway Amalgamation Act 1847 (10 & 11 Vict. c. ccxxii) on 22 July 1847, but provisions for leasing by other companies, chiefly the LNWR, were removed because of concerns about interests other than development of the docks. Nevertheless the BL&CJR now controlled the Birkenhead line.

=== 1848–1854 ===
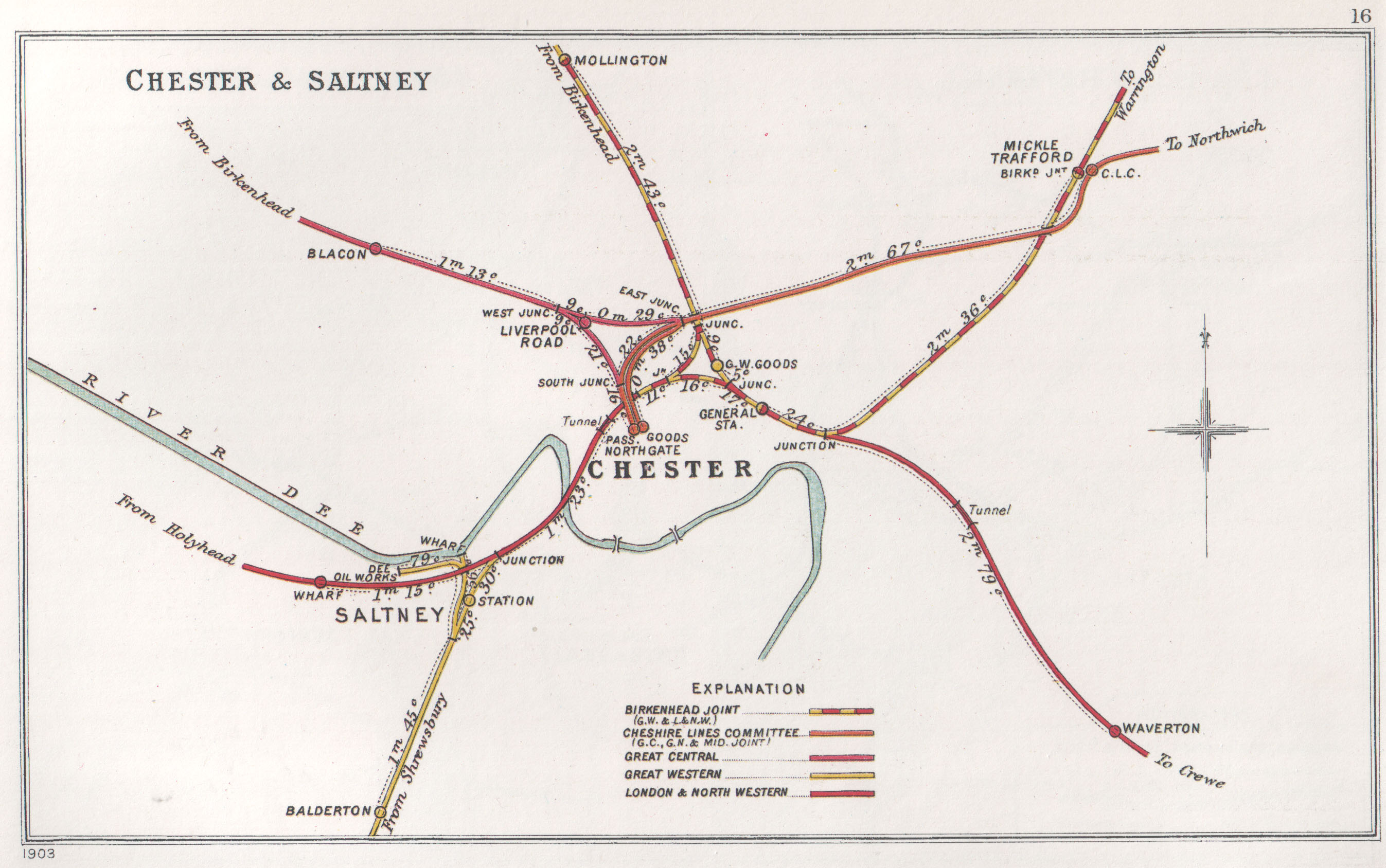
A 1903 Railway Clearing House map showing railways in Chester. The Birkenhead Railway is shown in yellow and red.

A joint station was opened at Chester on 1 August 1848; it cost £55,000 and was to be jointly operated and accessible to the LNWR, Chester and Holyhead Railway, Shrewsbury and Chester Railway (S&CR), and Birkenhead, Lancashire and Cheshire Junction Railway.

The Shrewsbury and Chester Railway had emerged from the North Wales Mineral Railway, and brought considerable volumes of minerals, chiefly coal, from Flintshire to Birkenhead; there was a triangle of lines at Chester station, enabling these trains to avoid the station. The LNWR felt threatened by this traffic, which it considered should come to it. Moreover the Shrewsbury and Chester Railway was aligning itself with the Great Western Railway (GWR) as a possible through route to London via Shrewsbury. The LNWR started upon hostile acts towards the Birkenhead line and the Shrewsbury and Chester line, and these escalated in aggression and illegality.

The BL&CJR directors were supine in the face of these acts until a shareholders' meeting on 23 October 1850, when shareholder dissatisfaction motivated the board to take a firmer line with the LNWR. The Shrewsbury and Chester Railway (Birkenhead Station) Act 1851 (14 & 15 Vict. c. cxxxi) gave the Shrewsbury and Chester Railway running powers to Birkenhead greatly increasing the traffic.

On 30 April 1851 the Sutton Tunnel railway accident took place near Frodsham on the line to Warrington. Nine people died. The collision was caused by a loosely managed time-interval system which was in operation; the directors were heavily criticised for their lax management of the line.

In January 1854 there was renewed hostility against the Shrewsbury and Chester Railway, and the matter went to arbitration; the arbitrator found in favour of the S&CR and awarded them running powers which gave them access to Manchester and Liverpool, as well as other important benefits.

=== Joint railway of GWR and LNWR ===
Birkenhead Railway Act 1859
- Act of Parliament
- Parliament of the United Kingdom
- Long title: An Act to authorize the Birkenhead, Lancashire, and Cheshire Junction Railway Company to make a Railway from Hooton to Helsby, with a Branch to Tranmere Pool; and for other Purposes.
- Citation: 22 & 23 Vict. c. lxxiv

Dates
- Royal assent: 1 August 1859

Birkenhead Railway (Vesting) Act 1861
- Act of Parliament
- Parliament of the United Kingdom
- Long title: An Act for vesting the Birkenhead Railway in the London and North-western Railway Company and the Great Western Railway Company, and for other Purposes.
- Citation: 24 & 25 Vict. c. cxxxiv

Dates
- Royal assent: 11 July 1861

In 1851 negotiations for a lease of the BL&CJR to the GWR were started, but the idea fell through. Soon the rival LNWR attempted a lease of the BL&CJR, but the Birkenhead Town and Dock Commissioners successfully objected, because of the LNWR commitment to Liverpool.

From 1 September 1854 the GWR and the Shrewsbury and Chester Railway amalgamated, and the GWR was given running powers to Birkenhead, and was able to take advantage of the Manchester and Liverpool powers.

The hostility between the companies waned a little and in 1858 the BL&CJR suggested joint ownership by the LNWR and GWR of their company. By the Birkenhead Railway Act 1859 (22 & 23 Vict. c. lxxiv) on 1 August 1859 the BL&CJR company changed its name to the Birkenhead Railway, and the transfer of ownership took effect as a working arrangement on 1 January 1860; it was ratified by Parliament in the Birkenhead Railway (Vesting) Act 1861 (24 & 25 Vict. c. cxxxiv) and formalised with retrospective effect from 20 November 1860.

=== 1868–1898 ===
The LNWR opened the direct line over the Mersey at Runcorn on 1 February 1868, allowing London to Liverpool trains to avoid Warrington. In 1873 this was followed by their opening of the Halton Curve between Frodsham Junction and Helsby Junction. This considerably shortened the transit time between Chester and Liverpool and abstracted nearly all of the passenger traffic that had gone via Birkenhead and the Mersey ferries.

On 20 January 1886 the Mersey Railway opened between Liverpool James Street and Green Lane Junction in Birkenhead, where it entered on the Chester–Birkenhead line. The Mersey Railway was steam operated through steeply graded tunnels under the River Mersey. The section of the Joint Line at Green Lane Junction was already very congested, and it was agreed to make an interchange station at Rock Ferry, about 1 mile (1.6 km) south of the junction, with the Mersey Railway providing its own separate tracks to get there. The Mersey Railway extension to Rock Ferry opened on 15 June 1891.

For a short time there was a through service from Liverpool Central to London Paddington, via the Mersey Railway, starting in 1898.

=== After Grouping ===
In 1923 most of the railway companies of Great Britain were formed into one or other of four large new companies, in a process called the "grouping", following the Railways Act 1921. The GWR was largely unchanged in this part of the country; the LNWR joined the Midland Railway and others to form the new London Midland and Scottish Railway (LMS). The Mersey Railway remained independent but was broadly aligned to the LMS. The Joint Railway continued to be joint, now between the GWR and the LMS.

Road competition, especially for local passenger journeys, increased in intensity at this period, chiefly because of the roundabout nature of railway journeys from branch line settlements and the inconvenient location of many stations.

During World War II Liverpool suffered from heavy enemy bombing, but although the railway suffered damage, there was no strategic disruption. Birkenhead docks was heavily used for military purposes. A connection was laid in at Mickle Trafford between the Joint Line and the Cheshire Lines Committee route there, so as to divert goods traffic via Bidston, avoiding Chester General station.

=== Nationalisation ===
At the beginning of 1948 British Railways was established as a state-owned organisation. Little initiative was taken to rationalise the formerly competing facilities, such as the wasteful multiple goods depots. Much continued as before, but the transfer of bulk goods to containers, and the increasing use of road transport abstracted from the railway, which declined, as did passenger business.

== Network ==
=== Chester–Birkenhead line ===
The Chester and Birkenhead Railway was authorised on 12 July 1837, with capital of £250,000. It was to be a single line; no intermediate stations had been planned at this stage. George Stephenson was the engineer. It opened in 1840.

=== Chester–Warrington line ===
The Chester–Warrington line opened in 1850 and runs from Chester to a junction with the West Coast Main Line, south of Warrington.

=== Hooton–Helsby line ===
As much of the goods and mineral traffic to and from Birkenhead had Manchester as its terminal, the joint companies decided to build the Helsby branch, a straight route of nearly 9 miles (14 km). It intersected the Shropshire Union Canal at Ellesmere Port, then a very busy dock, but no railway connection was made there. The branch opened on 1 July 1863, shortening the transit to Manchester by 11 miles (18 km).

=== Hooton–West Kirby line ===
A branch from Hooton to Parkgate was planned, chiefly to access collieries at Neston, and potentially to develop a residential district. It opened on 1 October 1866 as a single line, with provision for later doubling and extension beyond Parkgate.

In 1881, the Joint Line directors decided to extend the railway from Parkgate to West Kirby, along a developing residential strip. This was authorised by an Act of 12 July 1882. It was hoped to agree a joint station with the Seacombe, Hoylake and Deeside Railway, (Note: At this stage the Seacombe, Hoylake and Deeside Railway was isolated in the North Wirral; much of its business was passenger travel from Liverpool arriving at Seacombe by ferry. Opening of the Mersey Railway and subsequent developments connected the company's line to the network in 1888.) proprietors of the existing West Kirby station, fed from the Birkenhead end via Hoylake, but this proved impossible and a separate station was built. The line opened on 19 April 1886 and the passenger train service ran from Birkenhead Woodside to West Kirby, via Hooton. In fact, the two stations at West Kirby were combined in 1896.

The Hooton–West Kirby line had never realised its potential; it was closed to passengers on 17 September 1956 and to freight traffic in May 1962. The track bed of this route is now the Wirral Way, a shared-use path forming part of the Wirral Country Park.

==== Stations ====
- Hooton: opened October or November 1840; still open for Wirral and Ellesmere Port Line services
- Hadlow Road: opened 1 October 1886 and closed 17 September 1956; station extant and restored
- Neston South: opened 1 October 1866, renamed Neston South in 1952 and closed 17 September 1956
- Parkgate: opened 1 October 1866 and closed 17 September 1956
- Heswall: opened 19 April 1886 and closed 17 September 1956
- Thurstaston: opened 19 April 1886 and closed 1 February 1954; platforms extant
- Caldy: opened 1 May 1909 and closed 1 February 1954
- Kirby Park: opened 1 October 1894 and closed 5 July 1954; schools' use continued until 17 September 1956
- West Kirby: opened 19 April 1886; the line's platforms closed on 17 September 1956, but the station remains open for Wirral Line services.
