= Thurstaston railway station =

Former railway station in Merseyside, England

Coordinates: 53.3427°N 3.1452°W

Thurstaston
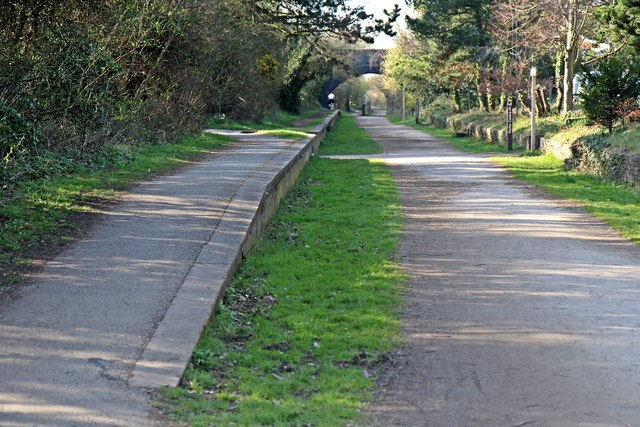
- The site of Thurstaston station as it appears today, now part of Wirral Country Park.

General information
- Location: Thurstaston, Wirral; England
- Grid reference: SJ238835
- Platforms: 2

Other information
- Status: Disused

History
- Pre-grouping: Birkenhead Railway
- Post-grouping: Birkenhead Railway; London Midland Region (British Railways)

Key dates
- 19 April 1886: Opened
- 1 February 1954: Closed to passengers
- 7 May 1962: Closed to freight
Location

Thurstaston railway station was a stop on the single tracked Hooton to West Kirby branch of the Birkenhead Railway, on the Wirral Peninsula, England. It served the village of Thurstaston, which lies to its north-east.

== History ==
The Birkenhead Railway, owned jointly by the Great Western Railway (GWR) and London and North Western Railway (LNWR), had initially opened a branch line from Hooton to Parkgate in 1866. An extension to West Kirby was completed twenty years later, including Thurstaston station which opened on 19 April 1886. Station Road was constructed from land donated by local landowners Thomas Ismay and the Glegg family to provide access from the village to the station.

Preceding station	Disused railways	Following station
Heswall	Birkenhead Railway; Hooton to West Kirby branch	Caldy

=== World War II ===
During the Second World War, the line was used for the transportation of munitions. Heavy anti-aircraft gun emplacements were built on land to the west of the station, which have since been grassed over.

=== Closure ===
Despite regular seasonal tourist use of the station, passenger numbers generally remained low. On 1 February 1954, the station was closed to passengers, although the line itself remained open to passenger trains for another two years. The track continued to be used for freight transportation and driver training for another eight years, closing on 7 May 1962. The tracks were lifted two years later.

=== Wirral Country Park ===
The route became the Wirral Way footpath and part of Wirral Country Park in 1973, which was the first such designated site in Britain.

== The site today ==
Unlike most of the stations on the line, the two platforms are still in situ, though the southbound platform is largely obscured by undergrowth; the Wirral Way continues to pass between them. The station buildings have been demolished.

One of two visitor centres for the Wirral Country Park is located on the station site.
