= Kirby Park railway station =

Former railway station in England

Coordinates: 53.3659°N 3.1766°W

Kirby Park
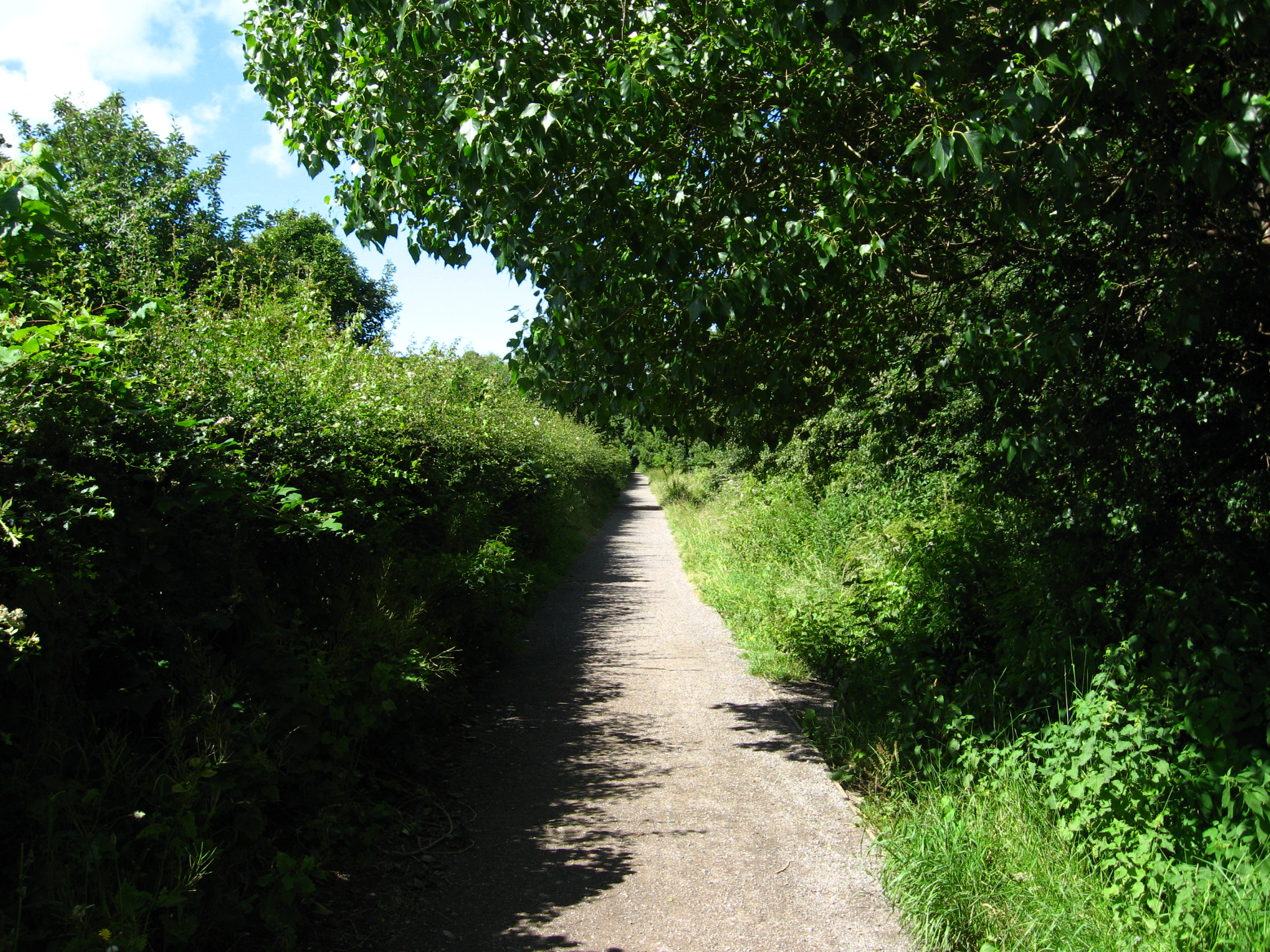
- The site of Kirby Park station on the Wirral Way.

General information
- Location: West Kirby, Wirral; England
- Grid reference: SJ217860
- Platforms: 1

Other information
- Status: Disused

History
- Pre-grouping: Birkenhead Railway
- Post-grouping: Birkenhead Railway; London Midland Region (British Railways)

Key dates
- 1 October 1894: Opened
- 5 July 1954: Closed to passengers
- 17 September 1956: Closed to school traffic
- 7 May 1962: Closed to freight
Location

Kirby Park railway station was a station on the single track Hooton to West Kirby branch of the Birkenhead Railway, on the Wirral Peninsula, England.

== History ==
The Birkenhead Railway, owned jointly by the Great Western Railway (GWR) and London and North Western Railway (LNWR), had initially opened a branch line from Hooton to Parkgate in 1866. An extension to West Kirby was completed twenty years later although Kirby Park station did not open until 1 October 1894. It was named after Kirby Park, the area surrounding the house Kirbymount, formerly the summer residence of John Hurleston Leche XV of Carden.

Originally considered an experimental station, it was constructed primarily of timber 800 m (870 yd) to the south of the current West Kirby railway station and served largely as a school stop for the nearby Calday Grange Grammar School.

=== Closure ===
Kirby Park railway station closed before most of the stations on the line on 5 July 1954, however for school purposes it remained open until 1956. The track continued to be used for freight transportation and driver training for another six years, closing on 7 May 1962. The line was lifted two years later with the station building and platform completely demolished. The only evidence that a station stood on this site is the entrance on Sandy Lane in West Kirby.

=== Wirral Country Park ===
The route became the Wirral Way footpath and part of Wirral Country Park in 1973, which was the first such designated site in the United Kingdom.

Preceding station	Disused railways	Following station
Caldy	Birkenhead Railway; Hooton to West Kirby branch	West Kirby
