= Wirral Country Park =

Country park on the Wirral Peninsula, England

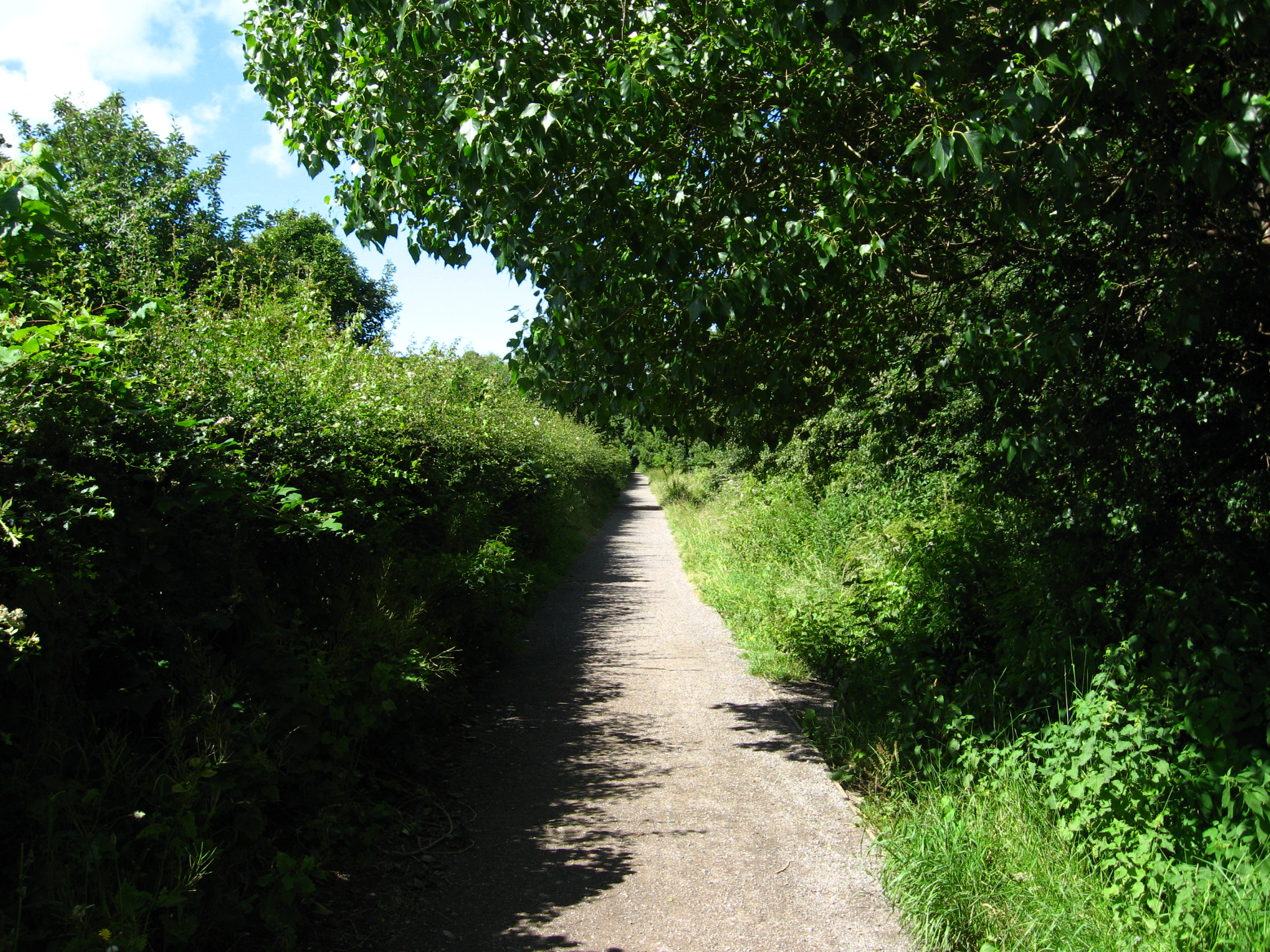
- The site of Kirby Park railway station, now given over to the Wirral Way.

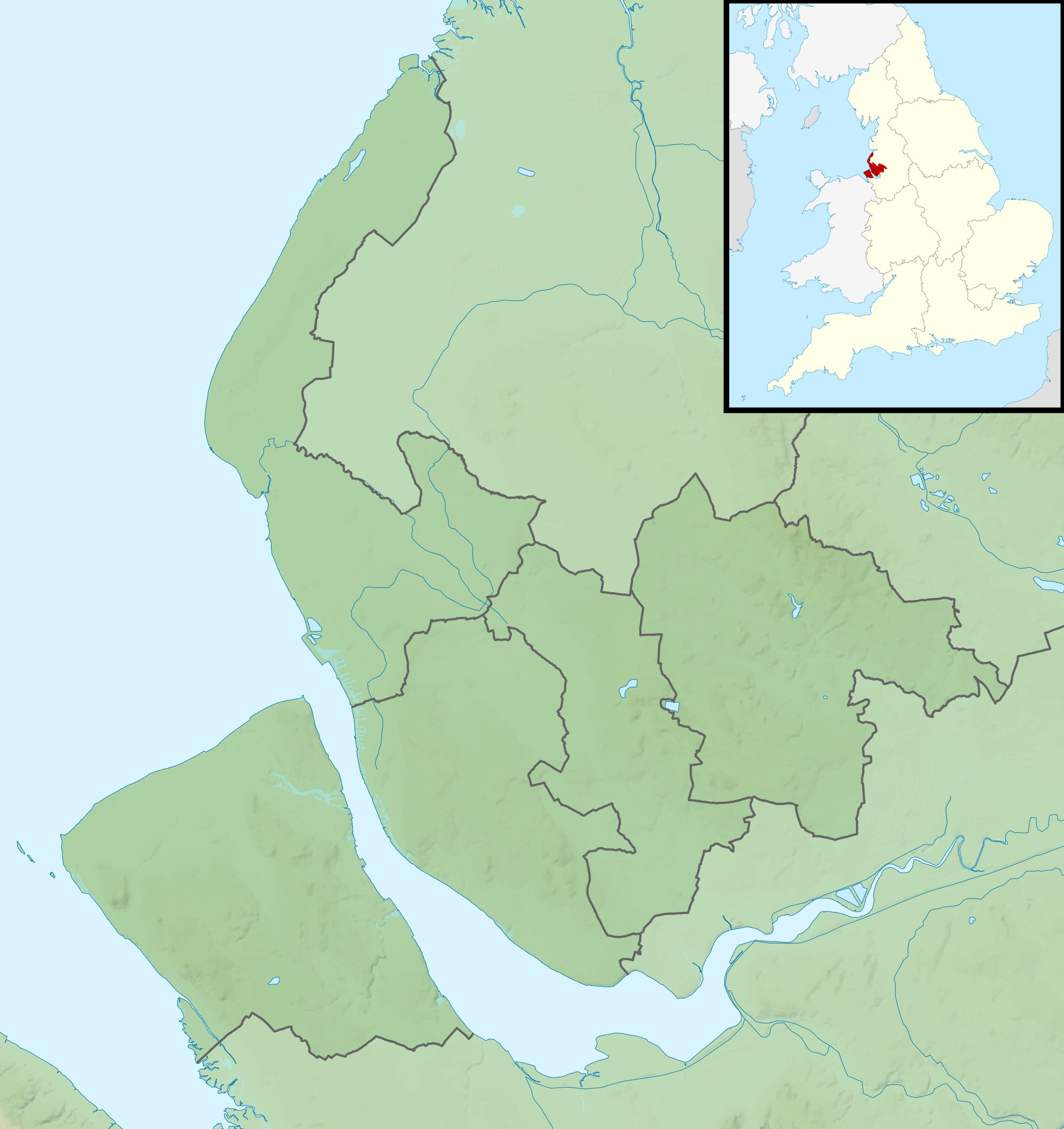
- Location within Merseyside
- Type: Public park
- Location: Station Road; Thurstaston; Merseyside; CH61 0HN
- Coordinates: 53°20′33″N 3°8′44″W
- Created: 1973
- Operator: Metropolitan Borough of Wirral, Cheshire West & Chester
- Open: All year
- Status: Open

Wirral Country Park lies on the Wirral Peninsula, England; it is split between the Metropolitan Borough of Wirral in the county of Merseyside and in the borough of Cheshire West & Chester in Cheshire. It was the first designated country park in Britain, opening in 1973.

The park lies along the Wirral Way, which follows the trackbed of part of the former Birkenhead Railway route from West Kirby (Note: The Wirral Way entrance lies just to the east of the station on the A540; location: 53.3732°N 3.109°W) to Hooton. (Note: The Wirral Way entrance is on the B5133 bridge, which crosses over the railway line; location: 53.2976°N 2.9774°W) The old line, which closed in 1962, follows the estuary of the River Dee for 7 miles (11 km) between West Kirby and Parkgate then heads inland, across the Wirral peninsula, to Hooton.

There are two visitor centres along the Wirral Way: one near the site of Thurstaston railway station, at Thurstaston, and the other at the preserved Hadlow Road railway station, in Willaston.

== History ==
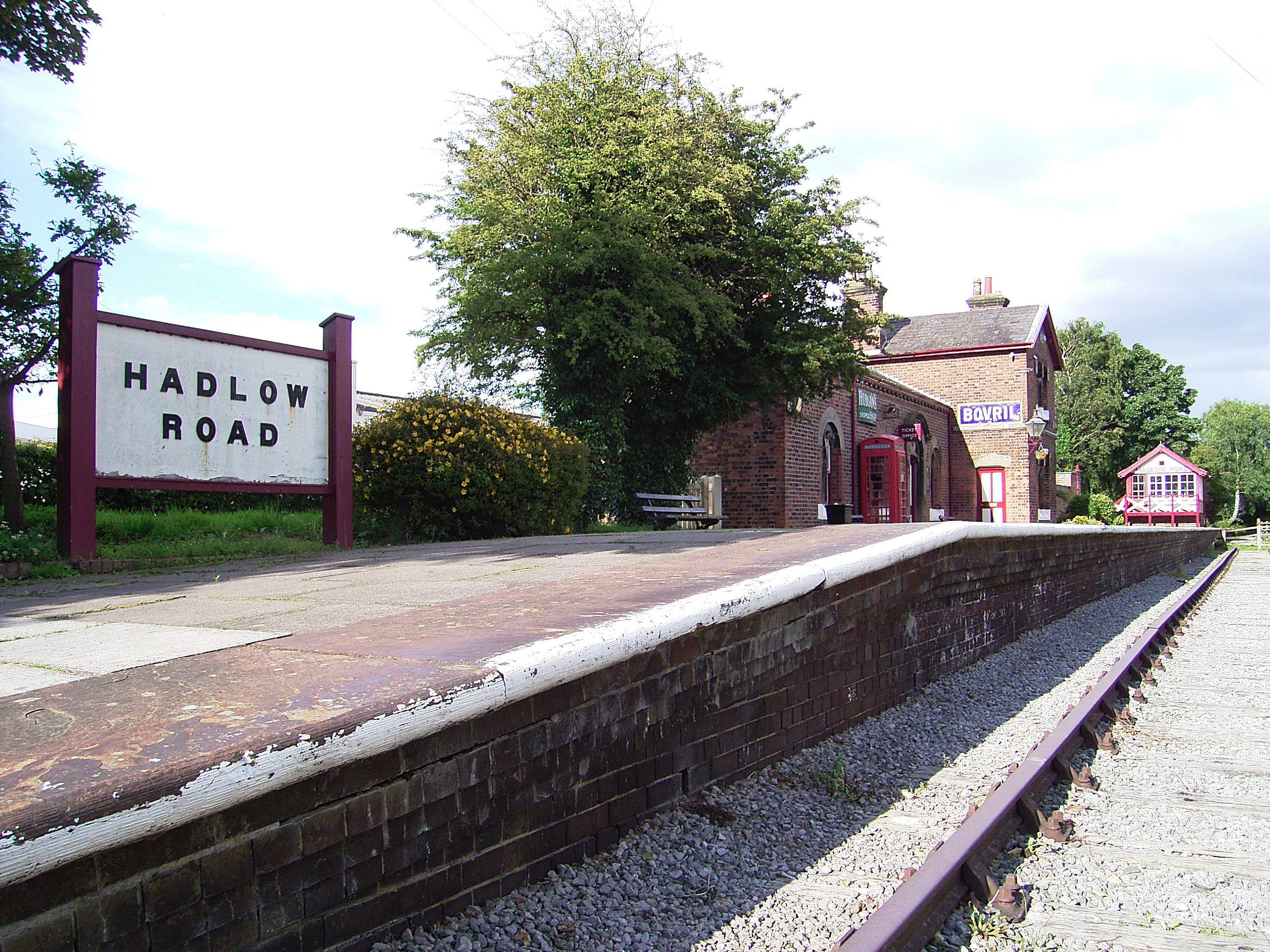
The preserved Hadlow Road station, on the Wirral Way at Willaston

Work began on the park in 1969 and the park was opened formally by Lord Leverhulme in 1973. The park's creation followed a successful campaign by Captain Lawrence Beswick DSM, which prompted the necessary investment from the Countryside Commission.

Construction of the park required the removal of 30 miles (48 km) of railway track and accompanying sleepers, the digging and forming of drainage channels, levelling and consolidation of thousands of tons of gravel or ballast, and the removal of some brick-built road bridges. Some of the few remains of the original railway line are the old platforms at Thurstaston, the preserved 1950s-era station at Hadlow Road, a number of bridges and occasional railway incline signs indicating the degree of climb or descent.

== Wildlife ==
The park is home to badgers, foxes and ten species of butterfly. The Dee estuary is home to populations of ragworm, lugworm and cockles, which support various species of bird in the area, including common redshanks, common shelducks, northern lapwings, skylarks, meadow pipits and common terns. During high spring tides, visitors may also catch a glimpse of certain birds of prey such as peregrines, hen harriers and day-hunting short-eared owls.

== Sport and recreation ==
Wirral Country Park is popular with ramblers and offers numerous walks; three are of particular note:

- The stretch of shoreline running a couple of miles from Thurstaston beach to Heswall beach, a popular route for horse riders.
- The Wirral Way, a 12-mile (19 km) shared-use path from West Kirby to Hooton. The country park itself lies along the Wirral Way towards the middle of this route.
- A 3.5-mile (5.6 km) circular Heswall Dales and fields walk, via a small valley known as The Dungeon.

The Wirral Coastal Walk is a well-known route within Merseyside, passing through Wirral Country Park and encompassing some of the aforementioned walks. It is organised as an annual event by the Rotary Club, with over 5,000 taking part in 2008. The walk follows the Wirral coastline from Seacombe Ferry on the River Mersey to Thurstaston Country Park on the River Dee, a distance of 15 miles (24 km). The annual event has become a popular way for local charities and organisations to raise money for their cause.

Wirral Country Park is popular not only for its wildlife and country walking, but also cycling, horse riding, kite flying, quad biking and paragliding. Part of the Wirral Endurance Ride, a horse-riding event in the Endurance GB National Championship, is held along the Wirral Way.

== Gallery ==
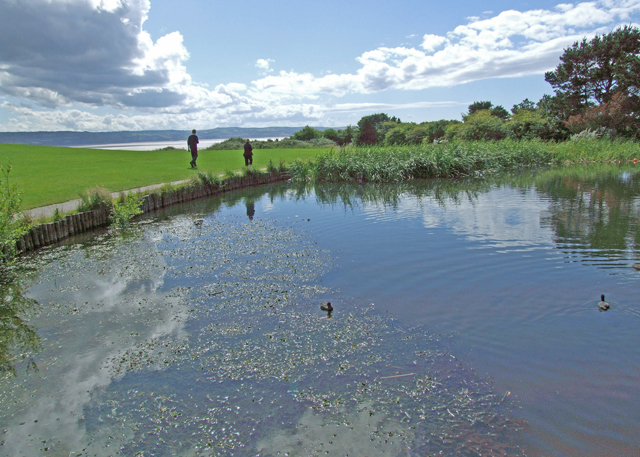
The pond at Thurstaston Visitor Centre

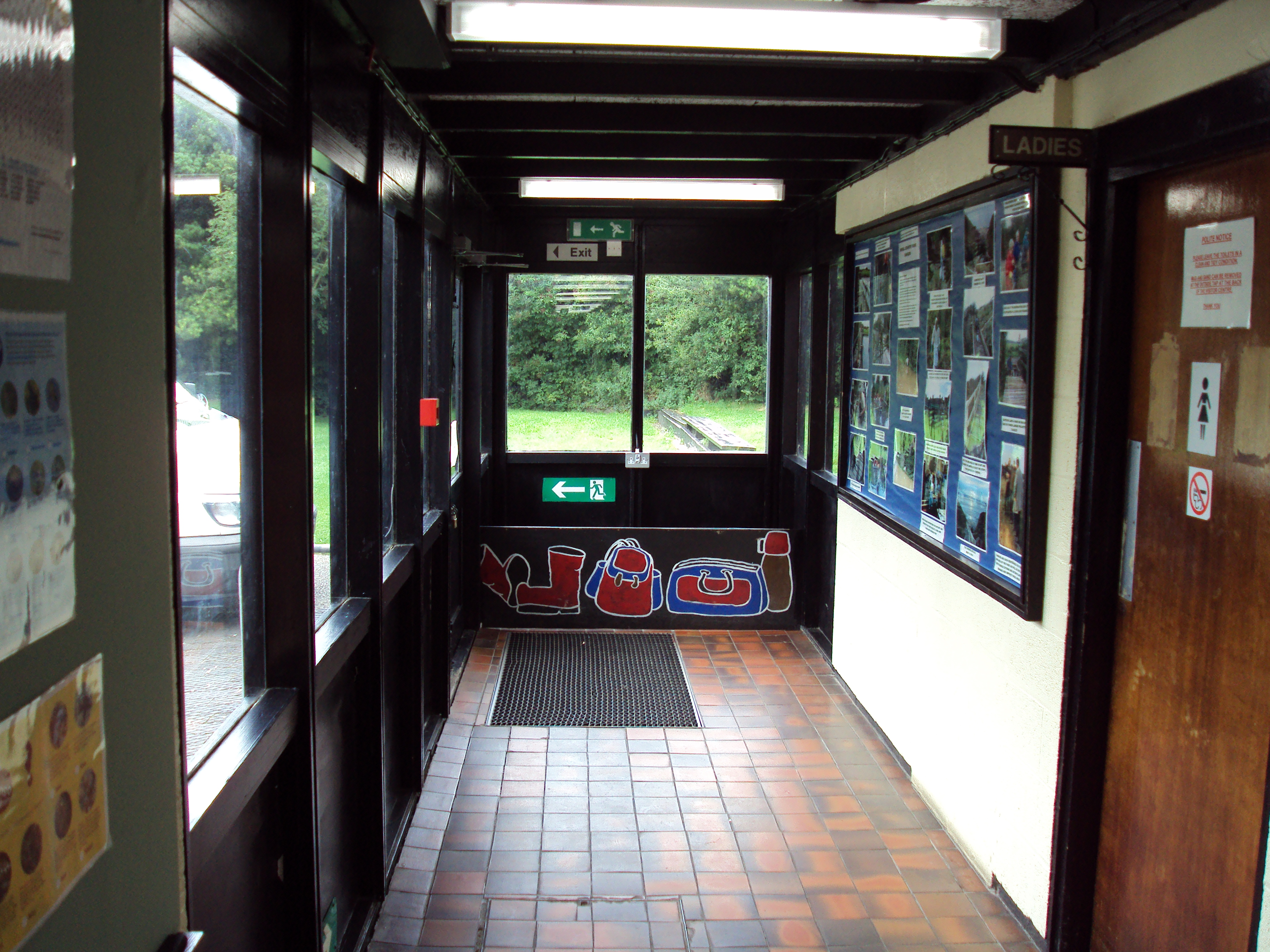
Inside Thurstaston Visitor Centre

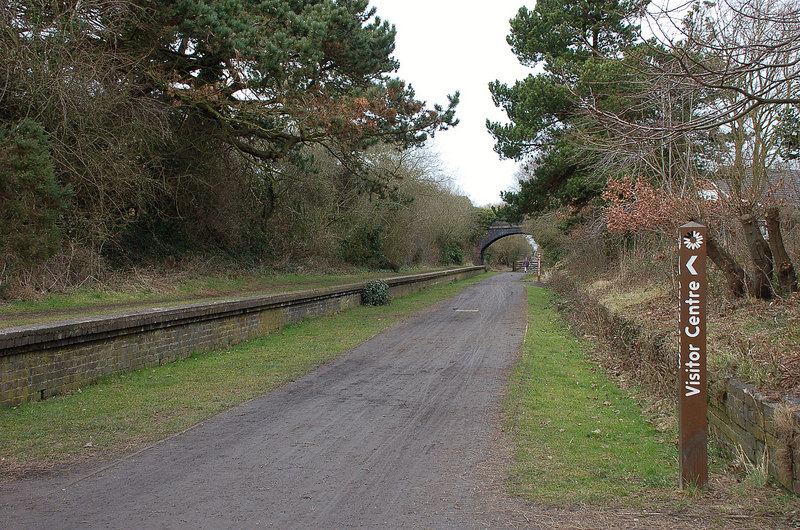
The former Thurstaston railway station

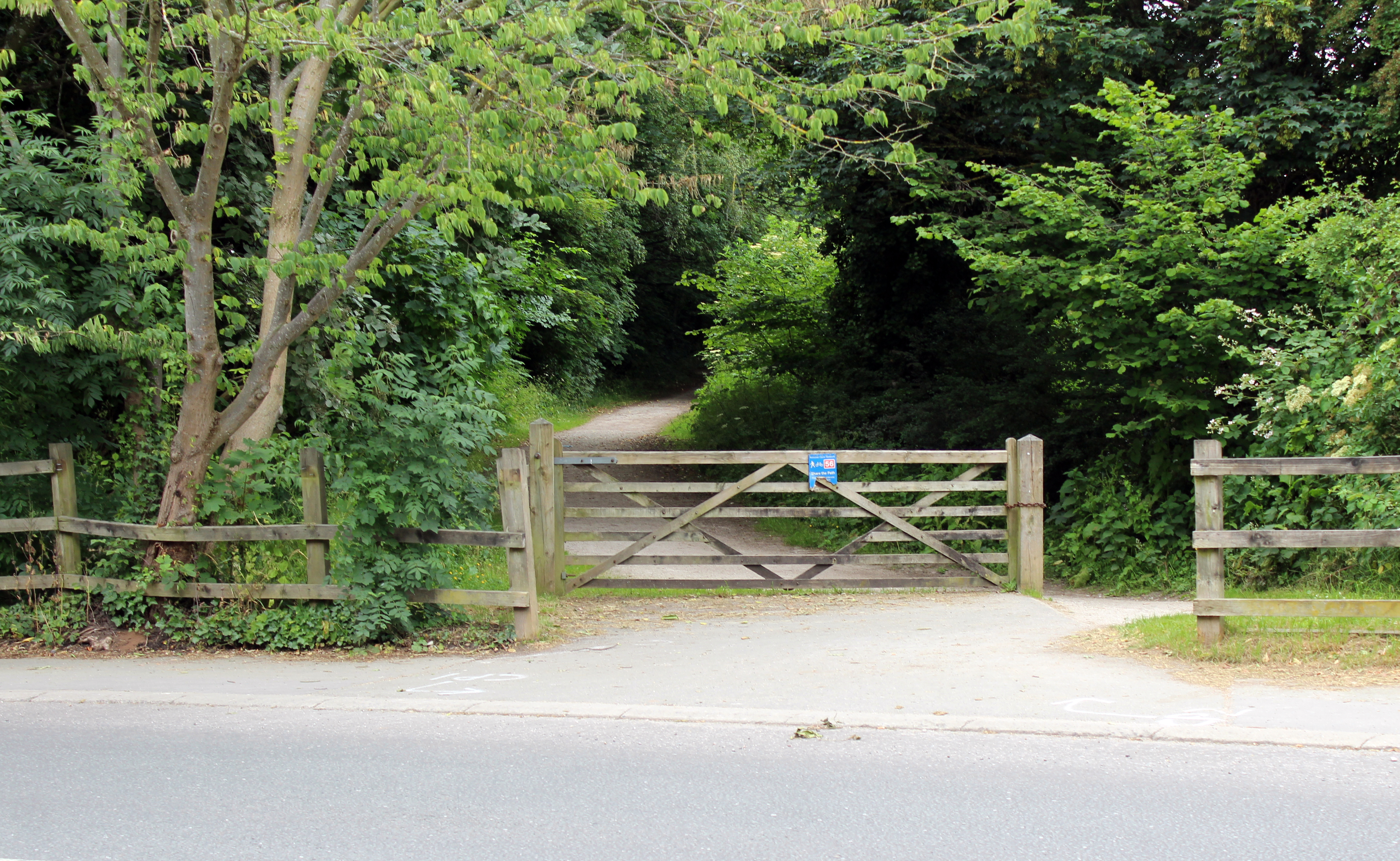
Wirral Country Park at Station Road in Parkgate

== See also ==
- List of rail trails
- List of recreational walks in Cheshire
