= West Kirby railway station =

Railway station in Merseyside, England

West Kirby
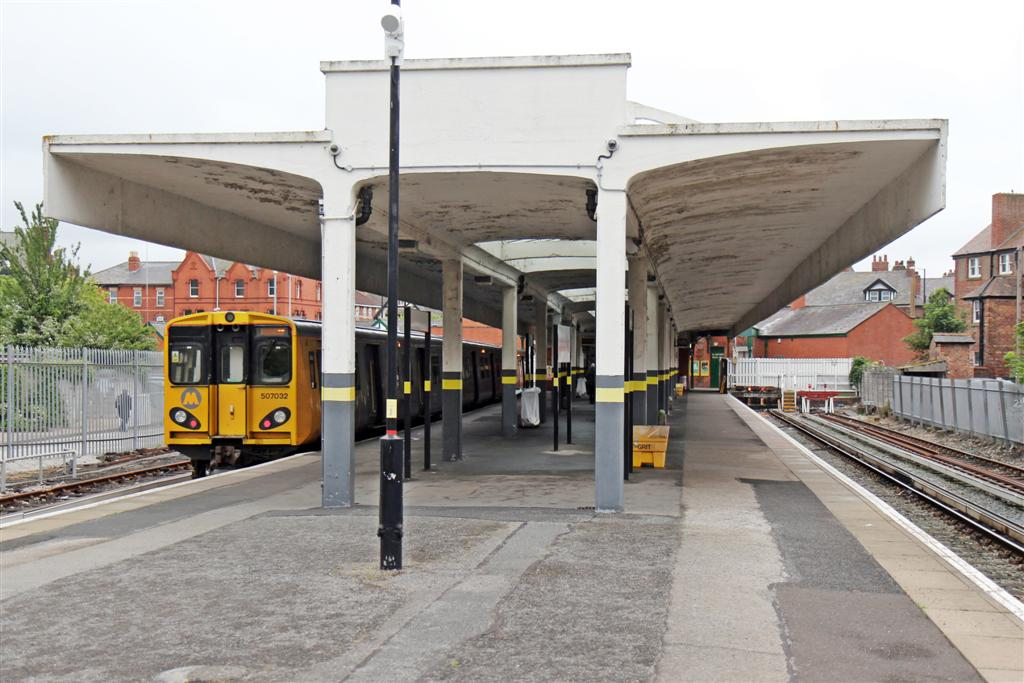
- The station in 2012

General information
- Location: West Kirby, Metropolitan Borough of Wirral, England
- Coordinates: 53.373°N 3.184°W
- Grid reference: SJ213869
- Manager: Merseyrail
- Transit authority: Merseytravel
- Platforms: 2

Other information
- Station code: WKI
- Fare zone: B2
- Classification: DfT category E

Key dates
- 1878: Opened
- 1938: Electrified

Passengers
- 2021/22: ▲0.891 million
- 2022/23: ▲0.959 million
- 2023/24: ▲1.018 million
- 2024/25: ▲1.236 million
- 2025/26: ▲1.495 million
Location
Notes
- Passenger statistics from the Office of Rail and Road

West Kirby railway station serves the town of West Kirby, in Merseyside, England. It is the terminus of the West Kirby branch line, one of the two branches of the Wirral Line on the Merseyrail network. There is a central island platform between two terminus tracks and two parallel sidings for out-of-use electric multiple units (EMUs). A second station lay just to the east of the Wirral Line station, which was the northern terminus of a branch line to Hooton; it was closed in 1962 and the former trackbed now forms part of the Wirral Way rail trail.

== History ==
=== Wirral line ===
In 1873, the Hoylake and Birkenhead Railway was authorised to construct two extensions to its lines. One was a short connecting section near to Birkenhead docks and the other was the 1.225 mi (1.971 km) extension from Hoylake to West Kirby. The station and the extension were opened on 1 April 1878 as the terminus of the Wirral Railway's route from Birkenhead Park. The station's original signal box was built in 1886, to a London and North Western Railway (LNWR) design. This signal box was removed and replaced in 1932.

After the opening of the Mersey Railway Tunnel in 1886, carriages were operated through Birkenhead Park every half-hour, all the way to Liverpool James Street. As traffic increased, the line into West Kirby was doubled from a single track in 1896. After a board meeting on 28 October 1895, it was decided to extend the line from Hooton into West Kirby. The station was relocated on the western side of the original station, with an enlarged island platform and rebuilt, in 1898–9, in red brick, with a turreted clock tower and mock Tudor frontage.

A further platform was constructed for the Hooton line, on the eastern side of the original station. The site of the original station was used for goods sidings. In the present day, this is the site of The Concourse, a community building operated by Wirral Metropolitan Borough Council.

In 1932, the London Midland and Scottish Railway (LMS) constructed a new signal cabin, used jointly with the Great Western Railway (GWR), which was installed on the western side of the tracks, just beyond the end of the platform; this replaced the earlier signal box in the same place. It was closed on 17 September 1994 and was demolished a week later.

Until 1964, there was an active freight depot on the eastern side of the station. It occupied the triangular area between the former Wirral Railway station, which received the electrified lines, and the former Birkenhead Joint branch station. The depot was mainly used to receive coal for domestic distribution. The area occupied by the freight depot was later used for the construction of The Concourse. The West Kirby goods depot was served principally by a daily goods train along the electric line from Birkenhead, which also served goods depots at Hoylake, Moreton and the Cadbury factory near Leasowe.

=== West Kirby to Hooton line ===
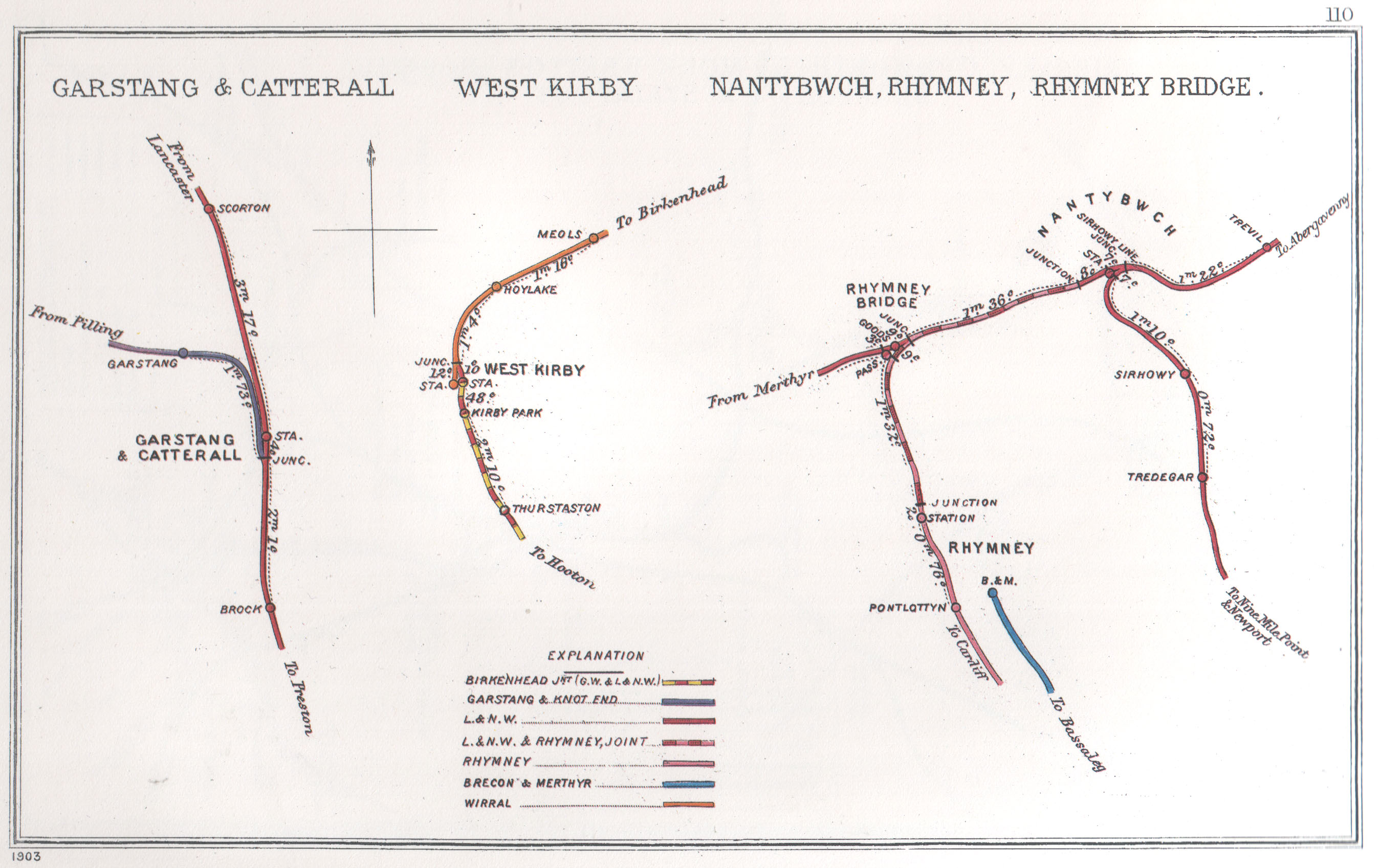
A 1903 Railway Clearing House junction diagram showing (centre) railways in the vicinity of West Kirby; the present station is on the left, the C&BR station is on the right)

West Kirby's station for services from Hooton opened on 19 April 1886

The station for the Hooton line was sited to the east of the existing station, along the alignment of what is now Orrysdale Road, between Bridge Road and Grange Road; it was equipped with a small turntable. The station was single-platformed and a single-storey building provided passenger and parcels facilities; it also had steam locomotive watering facilities at the southern end of the platform and a passing loop.

The only significant train along this route was a once-daily through service, often just one or two coaches, which ran until 1939. This service was from New Brighton to Hooton and Chester, via Bidston. The coaches were then attached to a train bound for London Euston. A principal traffic on the short-distance local trains was scholars travelling from stations along the route to the secondary schools in West Kirby.

The Birkenhead Joint branch station was effectively a separate facility to the main station on the electric lines. There was a junction between the two lines, underneath the Bridge Road overbridge; however, very few train movements connected between them.

In its final years, the almost-unused line was employed for the training of diesel multiple unit crews operating from Birkenhead and Chester, via Hooton. The station was closed to passengers on 17 September 1956 and closed completely on 7 May 1962.

The station site is now the location for several civic buildings and the route all the way to Hooton is now a shared-use path, known as the Wirral Way, which forms part of the Wirral Country Park.

=== Electrification ===
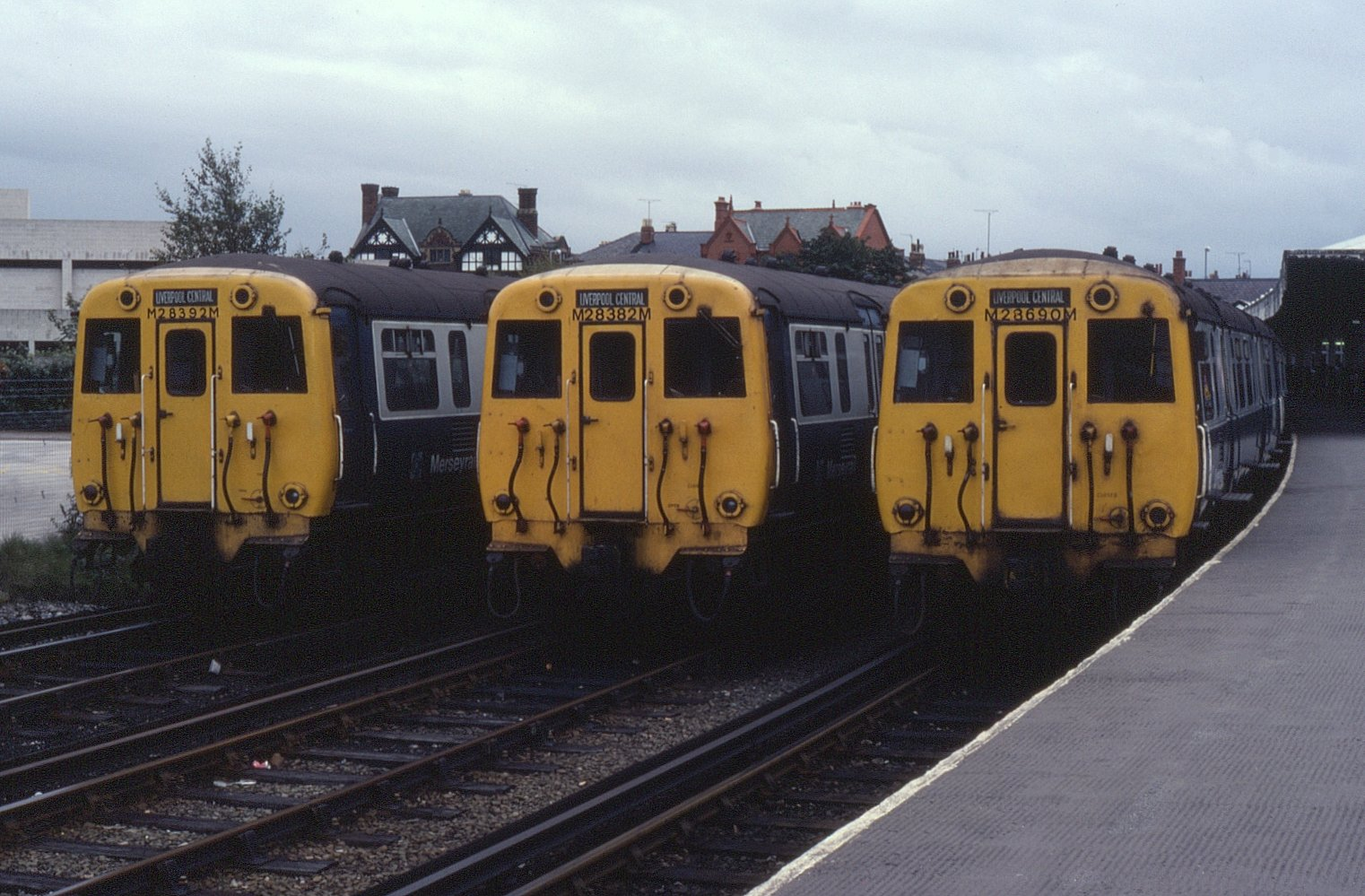
Class 503 EMUs at the station, September 1982

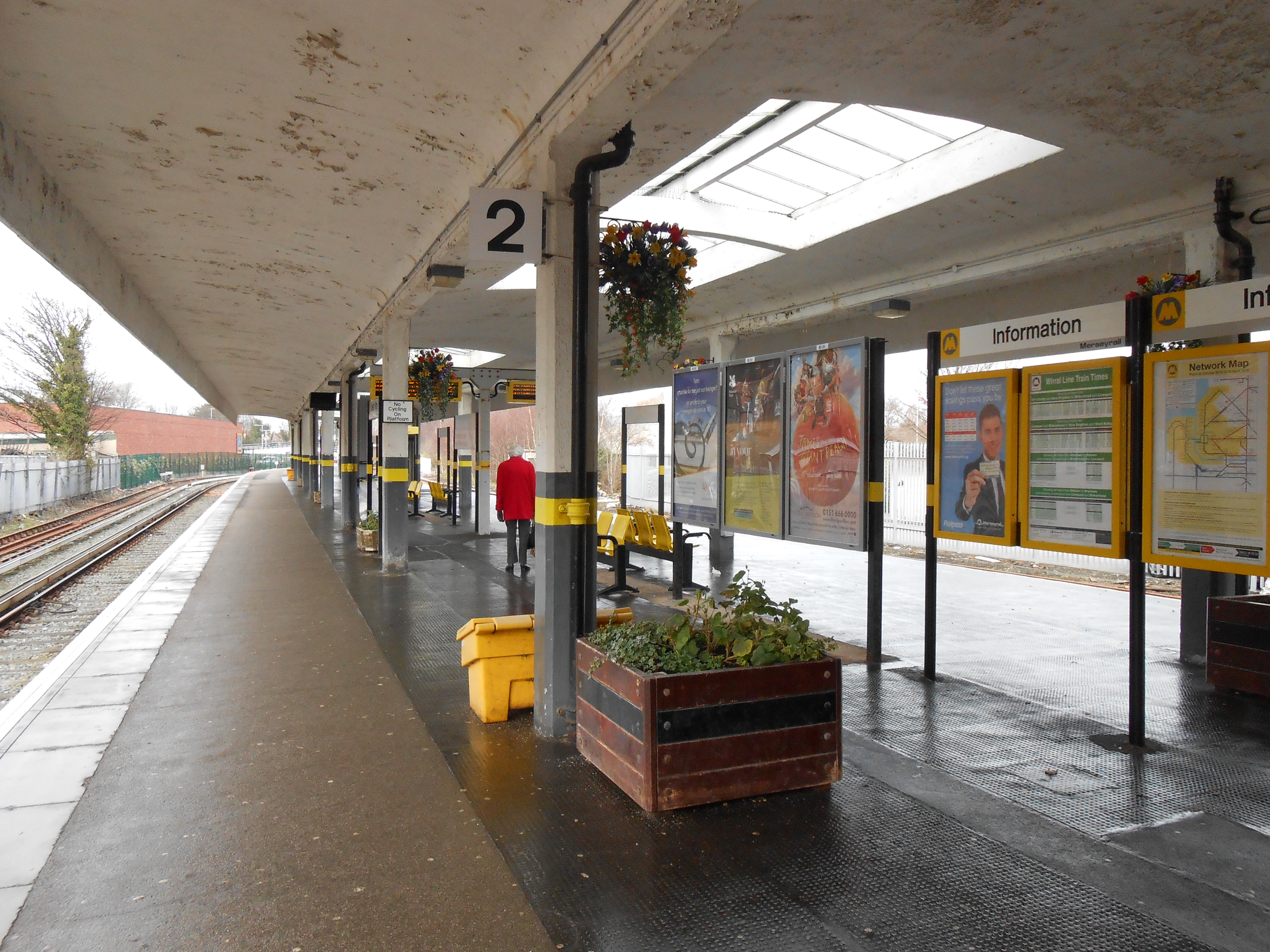
Beneath the Art Deco platform canopy, which was installed in 1938

Through electric services commenced on 13 March 1938, when the LMS electrified the lines from Birkenhead Park to West Kirby. The service was provided by the then-new Class 503 EMUs. However, on Sunday mornings, the service was provided by the older Mersey Railway electric units which, up until that point, had only ever run from Liverpool to Birkenhead Park. The 230 ft (70 m) concrete platform awning was erected, at the time of the 1938 electrification, along with a similar structure at New Brighton. However, the station building, across the end of the tracks, was left untouched from Victorian times.

=== Service disruptions ===
During July 2006, when the Open Golf Championship was held at the Royal Liverpool Golf Club, situated between West Kirby and Hoylake, services terminated at Hoylake. This was to allow competitors to cross the tracks from the practice course on one side to the championship course on the other. This caused some controversy locally, especially given the large increase in passengers during the championship.

== Facilities ==
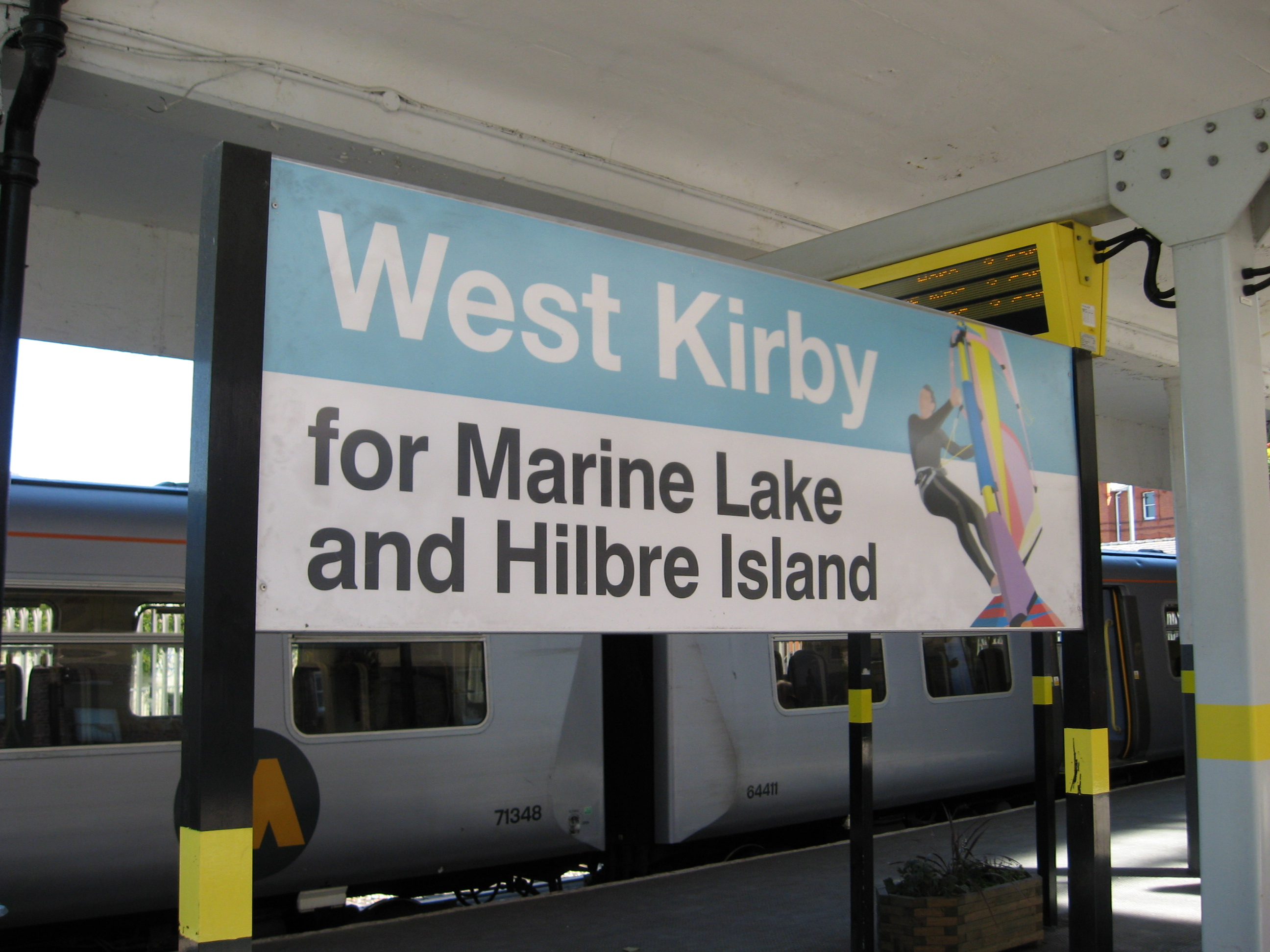
A station sign

The station has a booking office and a drop-off point for cars, with a 16-space bicycle rack and secure storage for ten. The station is staffed at all times during opening hours; it has screens for passenger information and platform CCTV.

The terminus island platform has open-air seating, a platform canopy and two payphones on the platform. Wheelchair and pram access to the platform is straightforward, being step-free.

Much of the station building has been rented out as retail units, which are accessed from the public road rather than from the railway premises.

== Services ==
Merseyrail operates services on the Wirral line to Liverpool Central, via Birkenhead Hamilton Square, every 15 minutes during daytime hours.

West Kirby on the Wirral Line

Preceding station	National Rail	Following station
Terminus	Merseyrail; Wirral Line; West Kirby branch	Hoylake towards Liverpool Central
	Disused railways	
Kirby Park	Chester and Birkenhead Railway; Hooton to West Kirby branch	Terminus

== Gallery ==
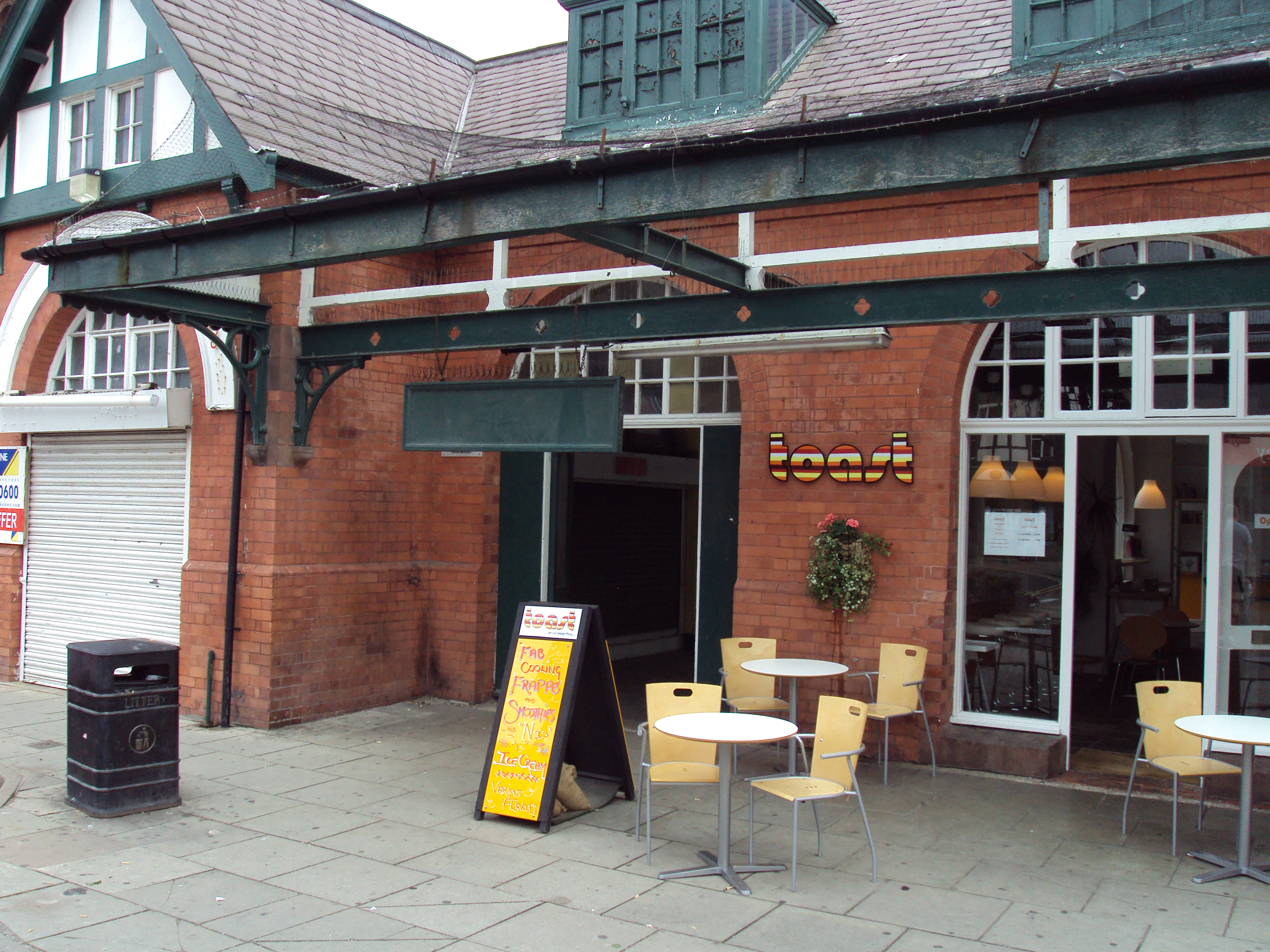
The station entrance

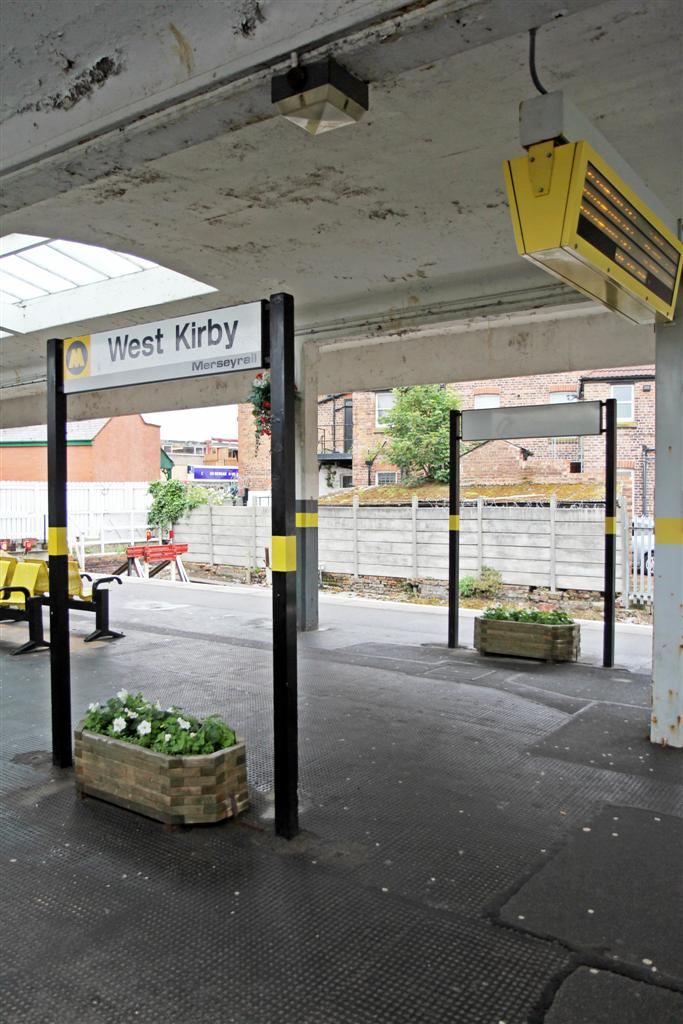
Beneath the station canopy

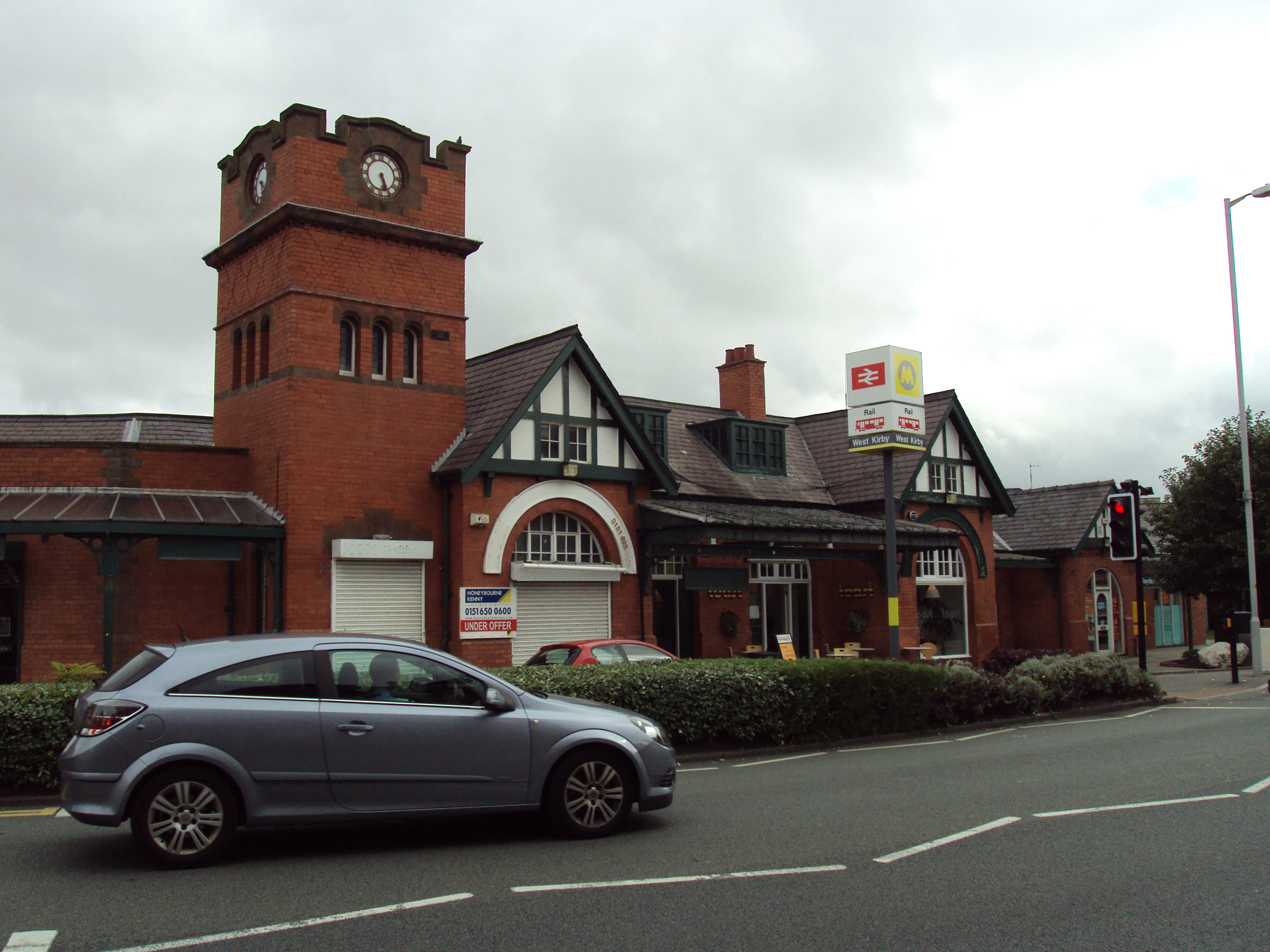
The station building, viewed from the main road

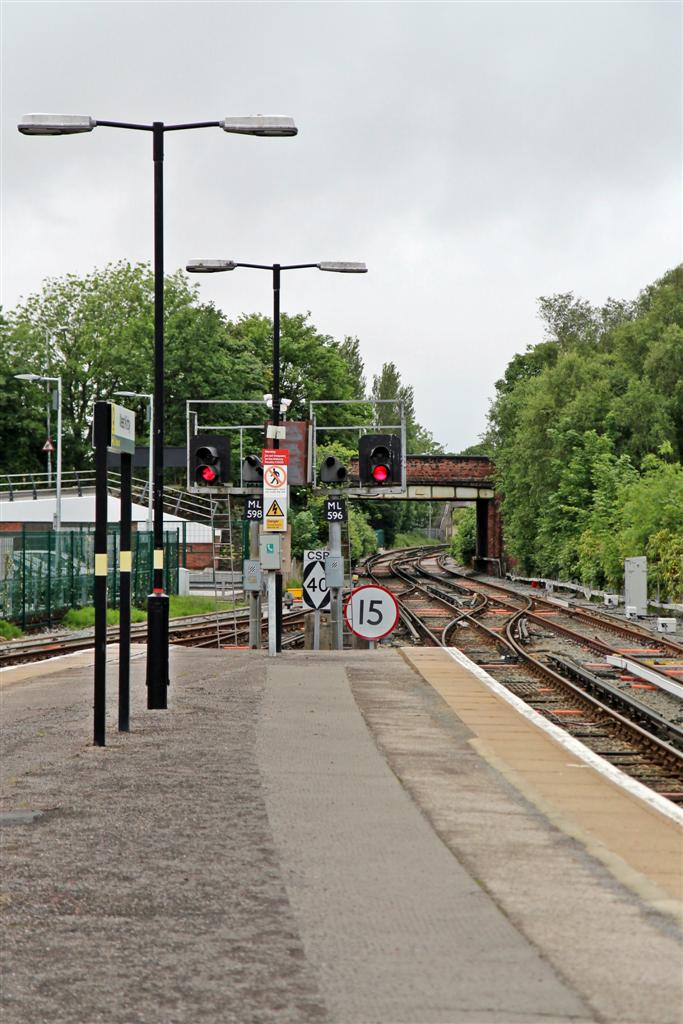
The end of the platform, looking towards Hoylake
