= Listed buildings in Hoylake =

Hoylake is a seaside town in Wirral, Merseyside, England. It contains 41 buildings that are recorded in the National Heritage List for England as designated listed buildings. Of these, two are listed at Grade II*, the middle of the three grades, and the others are at Grade II, the lowest grade. The list includes listed buildings in the town of Hoylake, and in the surrounding villages and areas of West Kirby, Caldy, Frankby, Meols, Grange, and Hilbre Island. In the list are houses and churches with associated structures, a telegraph station, a well house, a lighthouse, a village hall, banks, a drinking fountain, a war memorial, and a railway station.

== Key ==
Grade	Criteria
II*	Particularly important buildings of more than special interest
II	Buildings of national importance and special interest

== Buildings ==
Name and location	Photograph	Date	Notes	Grade
St Bridget's Church, West Kirby; 53.36875°N 3.17640°W		14th century	The tower was added between 1492 and 1530, and the rest of the church was restored and virtually rebuilt in 1869–70 when a south aisle was added. There was a further restoration and addition of a porch in 1876. The church is built in stone with a slate roof, and consists of a nave, aisles with porches, a chancel with a north chapel and vestry, and a west tower. The tower has buttresses, a west entrance, a Perpendicular west window, and an embattled parapet.	II
Greasby Old Hall; 53.37724°N 3.12409°W		Late 16th to early 17th century	The house is partly in stone, and partly in brick with stone dressings, the rear is roughcast, and the roof is slated. It has two storeys and an attic, and is in four bays, the fourth bay consisting of a cross-wing. The second bay forms a two-storey porch and has a lean-to outshut on the left, and the fourth bay is gabled with an attic. In the porch is a mullioned window, and the other windows contain casements.	II
New House, Grange; 53.38505°N 3.14266°W	—	Early to mid-17th century	A stone farmhouse with a hipped roof in two storeys with five bays. The windows on the ground floor are mullioned, and those on the upper floor also have transoms. On the front is an armorial plaque. The roof was originally gabled.	II
Caldy Manor; 53.35940°N 3.16352°W		17th century	A country house later used as a care home. The oldest part is the wing facing the street, but most of the building results from extensions and alterations in 1864 and 1907. It is in stone with a slate roof, and has a garden front of seven bays. On this front is a bowed oriel window and a canted bay window with a balustrade. Also incorporated in the house is a clock tower with a timber-framed upper stage that was designed by C. E. Kempe, and built for a chapel, the rest of which has been demolished.	II
Little Dene, Caldy; 53.35834°N 3.16674°W	Little_Dene,_Caldy,_Wirral	17th century	Extensions were added later to the house and it was restored in the 1830s. It is in stone with a slate roof and is stuccoed at the rear. The house has two storeys, with two bays facing the road and three bays on the right side. Some windows are sashes, some are casements, and there is a canted oriel window at the rear.	II
2 & 4 The Nook, Frankby; 53.37227°N 3.13522°W		1675	Formerly a public house, later converted into two houses. They are in brick with some timber-framing, and have a slate roof. The houses have one storey and an attic, and a three-bay front with a later extension on the right. The third bay projects forward and is gabled. The windows are casements, and there are two flat-topped dormers on the upper floor.	II
Corner Cottage, Caldy; 53.35861°N 3.16368°W		Late 17th century (probable)	Originally a cow house, it was later converted into a house and altered in the 1830s. The house has timber-framed cladding and a tiled roof, it is in a single story and has four bays. The entrance is at the rear and is approached by stone steps. The windows are casements. Inside, there is an exposed cruck truss.	II
Dee Haven, Caldy; 53.35871°N 3.16356°W	Dee_Haven_02	Late 17th century (probable)	A house, restored in the 1830s, with timber-framed cladding at the front, probably on stone, stone at the rear, and with a slate roof. It has two storeys and a three-bay front. The windows on the ground floor are casements, and on the upper floor they are horizontally-sliding sash windows.	II
The Nook and Nook Cottage, West Kirby; 53.36838°N 3.17307°W		Late 17th century	A pair of stone cottages on a bedrock base with a thatched roof. They have one storey with an attic, and are in six irregular bays. There are two mullioned windows, the others on the ground floor are casements, and there is an eyebrow dormer. To the right is a later two-bay extension.	II
The Manor, Greasby; 53.37706°N 3.12320°W		1680	Originally a farmhouse, later used as a bank, and then as a restaurant, it is in brick on a stone base, with stone dressings and a tiled roof. The building has two storeys and three bays, the central bay forming a two-storey gabled porch. The windows on the ground floor are casements, and on the upper floor they are horizontally-sliding sashes. Above the ground floor windows, the doorway, and the upper floor window of the porch are plaster tympani in segmental heads, and on the porch is a diamond-shaped datestone.	II
Gate piers, The Manor, Greasby; 53.37688°N 3.12317°W		c. 1680	The gate piers are in stone. They are fluted and have square stone caps.	II
Manor Farmhouse, Caldy; 53.35908°N 3.16281°W	Manor_Farmhouse,_Caldy_Road_01	1683	The farmhouse, renovated in the 1830s, is in brick and stone, and has a slate roof. It has two storeys, and a two-bay front, with a one-bay single-storey extension to the right. The front has a gabled porch, and mullioned windows containing casements. In the extension is a horizontally-sliding sash window. The rear is partly stuccoed, and it contains sash windows.	II
Sunnyfold, Caldy; 53.35886°N 3.16342°W	96_Caldy_Road_01	1698	A house, renovated in 1830, that has been used in the past as a public house and as a post office. It is in stone with a slate roof, and has one storey with an attic, and a front of three bays. The central bay protrudes forward, it is gabled and forms a porch. The windows are mullioned and contain casements, and there are two gabled dormers. At the rear is a wing containing a shop window.	II
Banks Farmhouse, Caldy; 53.35827°N 3.16368°W	Banks_Farmhouse,_Caldy_2020	1702	A stone house with a slate roof, in two storeys with a three-bay front, a one-storey one bay extension to the left, and a one-bay extension to the right. Most windows are mullioned with casements, and there is a horizontally-sliding sash window in the right bay. On the front are a doorway with a decorated lintel, a datestone, also decorated, and a gabled half-dormer.	II
Yew Tree Farmhouse, Frankby; 53.37271°N 3.13662°W		1710	A brick farmhouse on a stone base with stone dressings and a slate roof, it has two storeys with an attic, and two bays. Most windows are sashes, and there are two gabled dormers with casements. Also on the front is a diamond-shaped datestone.	II
Gate piers, Yew Tree Farmhouse, Frankby; 53.37265°N 3.13630°W		c. 1710	The gate piers are in stone. They are rusticated, and have cornices and ball finials.	II
Barn, The Manor, Greasby; 53.37734°N 3.12333°W		Early 18th century (possible)	The barn is mainly in stone, with some brick, and has a slate roof. It has five bays and a single-bay extension. The south front has two entrances, there are ventilation slits on the north side, an external staircase leading to a first-floor entrance on the east gable end, and on the west end is an entrance with a pitching hole above.	II
Well House Farmhouse, Frankby; 53.37244°N 3.13590°W		1730	A stuccoed house with a slate roof. It has two storeys with an attic, and is in two bays, with a later extension to the left. On the front is a datestone. The windows are 20th-century casements.	II
Garden wall, Well House Farmhouse, Frankby; 53.37237°N 3.13599°W		c. 1730 (probable)	The garden wall is in stone and has coping with roll moulding.	II
Old Post Office, Frankby; 53.37217°N 3.13597°W		1740	A stuccoed house, formerly a post office, with a slate roof. It has two storeys and two bays, with a datestone on the front. The casement windows and the door date from the 20th century.	II
Redstone Farm, Meols; 53.39974°N 3.16616°W		18th century	A house in whitewashed brick with a slate roof, in two storeys and four bays, and with a lean-to bay on the left. The porch has a pediment, and above the paired doors is a fanlight. Most of the windows are sashes, there is one casement window in the lean-to bay, and at the rear the windows are horizontally-sliding.	II
Rose Cottage, Meols; 53.40068°N 3.16464°W		18th century	A stone house with a thatched roof in a single storey with six irregular bays. Most of the windows are casements, and there is one horizontally-sliding sash window.	II
House and store, Hilbre Island; 53.38259°N 3.22688°W		c. 1836	The house and store are roughcast with a slate roof, and have an L-shaped plan. The house has two storeys and three bays, with a single-bay extension to the left. Above the entrance is a fanlight, and most of the windows are sashes.	II
Telegraph station Hilbre Island; 53.38284°N 3.22790°W		1841	The telegraph station is in painted stone with a slate roof. It is in a single storey with a bowed north end containing small-paned glazing and four brass gimbals for telescopes. On the east side is a timber platform and an entrance.	II
Well house, Grange, West Kirby; 53.36701°N 3.16412°W		Mid-19th century	The well house is in stone, it has a rectangular plan, and a hipped stone roof. The entrance has a four-centred arch with a hood mould, and the door has studs and strap hinges. On the roof are triangular vents.	II
Church of St John the Divine, Frankby; 53.37472°N 3.13323°W		1861–62	The church was designed by W. and J. Hay. It is built in stone and has a slate roof with bands of different colours. It consists of a nave with a south porch, a north aisle, and a chancel with a north vestry. There is a bellcote on the east gable of the nave. It contains stained glass windows designed by Edward Burne-Jones.	II
Hoylake Lighthouse; 53.39202°N 3.18249°W		1865	The lighthouse and keeper's house are in brick with stone dressings. The lighthouse consists of a tapering octagonal tower with a recessed octagonal lantern, a conical roof, and a weathervane. The keeper's house has two storeys, a central porch, and flanking two-storey bay windows. The windows are casements with segmental heads.	II
Church of the Resurrection and All Saints, Caldy; 53.35845°N 3.16404°W		1868	Built originally as a school designed by G. E. Street, it was extended and converted into a church in 1906–07 by Douglas and Minshull. It is constructed in stone with a slate roof and a tiled crest, and consists of a nave, a chancel, a north aisle, and a northeast saddleback tower.	II
Hill Bark Farmhouse, Frankby; 53.36450°N 3.13065°W		1875	The farmhouse was designed by John Douglas as part of a model farm. It has five bays, three of which have two storeys and the others are in a single storey. The ground floor is in stone, the upper floor is timber-framed, and there is a tiled roof. In the fourth bay is a two-storey gabled porch. The windows are mullioned with casements, and there are two gabled half-dormers.	II
Outbuildings, Hill Bark Farm; 53.36424°N 3.13056°W		1875	The outbuildings were designed by John Douglas as part of a model farm. They are in stone with some timber-framing and a tiled roof. The outbuildings have an L-shaped plan, and are in two storeys. Their features include various openings, including gabled dormers, and pitch holes.	II
Village Hall, Caldy; 53.35875°N 3.16387°W		1883	Built as a village reading room, the hall is half-timbered and jettied on a high stone base with a tiled roof. It has one storey and a basement, and a three-bay front. In the centre is a five-light under a gable, and flanking it are two-light casement windows. On the right side is a gabled porch.	II
St Andrew's Church, West Kirby; 53.37618°N 3.18585°W		1889–91	The church was begun by Douglas and Fordham, and completed in 1907–09 by Douglas and Minshull. It is in stone with a slate roof, and has a cruciform plan. The church consists of a nave with a clerestory, aisles, a crossing, transepts, and a chancel. Above the crossing is a slate-hung spire set diagonally.	II
Hill Bark, Frankby; 53.36377°N 3.13464°W		1891	A large house designed by Edward Ould for Robert William Hudson, originally on Bidston Hill. It was dismantled and rebuilt on its present site in 1929–31, and has since been used as a hotel. The building has a U-shaped plan, it is timber-framed on a stone base, and it has a stone-slate roof. Features include gables, decorative panels, mullioned and transomed windows, and oriel windows. Inside is a great hall containing an organ gallery.	II*
St Hildeburgh's Church, Hoylake; 53.39100°N 3.18360°W		1897–99	The church was designed by Edmund Kirby. It is built with brick and terracotta with a tiled roof. The church consists of a nave with a clerestory, aisles, a northwest porch, a west baptistry, and a chancel with a north vestry and a south chapel.	II
Drinking fountain, Hoylake; 53.39906°N 3.17665°W		1901	The drinking fountain has a cast iron openwork canopy on four columns with plaques of Queen Victoria on the sides, dragons on the corner, and a finial. Inside is a bowl with a water jet from a jet; this is carried on four columns. All the ironwork is decorated.	II
Barclays Bank, Hoylake; 53.39237°N 3.17711°W		1904–05	The bank was originally the Bank of Liverpool, and was designed by Willink and Thicknesse. It stands on a corner site, is built in brick with stone dressings and a Westmorland slate roof, and has two storeys and attics. There is one bay on Market Street and two on Alderley Road, with a canted entrance bay on the corner between them. The entrance is flanked by Tuscan columns, and the windows are sashes. On top of the corner bay is an octagonal turret with festoon decoration, and a shallow roof with a lead finial.	II
Congregational Church, Hoylake; 53.39003°N 3.18056°W		1905–06	The church was designed by Douglas and Minshull. It is in brick on a sandstone plinth, with sandstone dressings and a Westmorland slate roof. The church consists of a nave with a clerestory, aisles, transepts, and a polygonal apse. The west end contains a six-light Perpendicular window, it is flanked by buttresses rising to crocketed pinnacles. Inside the church is a hammerbeam roof.	II
Barclays Bank, West Kirby; 53.37307°N 3.18450°W		1906–07	The bank was originally the Bank of Liverpool, and was designed by Edmund Ware. It stands on a corner site, is built in stone and in brick with stone dressings, and has a Westmorland slate roof. The entrance is on the corner, and is flanked by paired Doric columns. Above it is a segmental pediment, and a square two-stage domed tower. Other features include mullioned and transomed windows flanked by columns, a balustrade, and gabled dormers.	II
War memorial, Grange Hill; 53.37538°N 3.17538°W		1922	The war memorial was designed by Hall and Glover, and sculpted by Charles Sargeant Jagger. The memorial consists of a tall shouldered obelisk in Cornish granite with a rounded top standing on steps, which in turn stand on a T-shaped pedestal in red sandstone. At the base of the obelisk are two standing figures in bronze. On the west side is a woman representing Humanity with chains hanging from her wrists and holding a wreath. On the opposite side is a soldier in full battle dress. Also on the obelisk are inscriptions, including the names of those who were lost in the World Wars.	II*
War memorial, St Bridget's Church; 53.36864°N 3.17613°W		1923	The war memorial stands in the churchyard of St Bridget's Church. It is in granite, and consists of a wheel-head cross on a tapering shaft carved with a sword, and at the base is a knot-work cross. The shaft stands on a square slightly tapered inscribed plinth with a base of two hexagonal steps.	II
Hoylake Railway Station; 53.38991°N 3.17895°W		1938	The railway station has a concrete frame with brick cladding, and is in Modernist style. It is in a single storey, and has a ten-bay front, the third to fifth bays being recessed. The flat roof extends to form a canopy. The entrance is in the seventh bay, and leads to the tiled booking hall, above which is a round drum. The windows have iron frames wit horizontal glazing bars.	II
