= Listed buildings in Stretton, Warrington =

Stretton is a civil parish in the Borough of Warrington in Cheshire, England. It contains nine buildings that are recorded in the National Heritage List for England as designated listed buildings, all of which are listed at Grade II. This grade is the lowest of the three gradings given to listed buildings and is applied to "buildings of national importance and special interest". The M56 motorway runs through the parish in an east–west direction, and the A49 road runs in a north–south direction. The northern part of the parish is residential, and the rest is mainly rural. Apart from St Matthew's Church and a milestone, the listed buildings are related either to houses or to farming.

Name and location	Photograph	Date	Notes
Stretton Hall; 53.3320°N 2.5718°W	—	1664	This originated as a timber framed hall with brick nogging. It was restored and extended in brick during the 19th century. The roofs are in slate-stone. The front is timber-framed in two storeys, with a two-storey porch, and projecting gables on each side. The windows are mullioned.
Tanyard House; 53.3334°N 2.5662°W	—	Early 18th century	A farmhouse, constructed in pebbledashed brick with slate roofs. It has two storeys and attics, with casement windows. Inside the house are oak purlins, beams, and a dog-leg staircase.
Former Barn, Stretton House; 53.3291°N 2.5671°W	—	1769	Originally a barn this has been converted into a garage. It is in brick with tiled roofs. Its features include doorways, one of which is blocked, casement windows, and a circular pitch hole.
Firtree House; 53.3360°N 2.5769°W	—	Late 18th century	A farmhouse, this is in brick on a stone plinth with rusticated quoins and slate roofs. It in three storeys and three bays. The windows are sashes with keystone heads. The door has a Doric case, an open pediment, and a fanlight.
Stable, Wallspit; 53.3330°N 2.5753°W	—	Late 18th century (probable)	This is a small stable with a hayloft, constructed in sandstone with a slate roof. Its features include a divided stable door, a small-pane window, and rectangular vents.
Stretton House; 53.3295°N 2.5673°W	—	1788	Alterations and additions were made to the house between 1800 and 1830, and in about 1945. It is constructed in brick, and has projecting gables and a variety of windows. Above the door is a fanlight.
Wallspit; 53.3334°N 2.5751°W	—	1791	A country house, later altered and extended. It is in brick on a stone plinth with rusticated quoins and stone-slate roofs. The front is symmetrical, in three storeys and three bays. The windows are sashes, and the porch is recessed with a rusticated surround.
St Matthew's Church; 53.3404°N 2.5717°W		1870	Designed by George Gilbert Scott, the church replaced an earlier, smaller Commissioners' Church by Philip Hardwick. It is constructed in sandstone, with Westmorland slate roofs, in Gothic Revival style, The church includes a west tower and an octagonal northwest turret. The east window contains stained glass of 1939 by Trena Cox.
Milestone; 53.34532°N 2.57604°W	—	1896	A triangular milepost in cast iron on the east side of the A49 road. Its cast-iron lettering indicates the distances to Great Budworth, Northwich, Stockton Heath, and Warrington.
