= St Andrew's Church, West Kirby =

Coordinates: 53.3761°N 3.1858°W

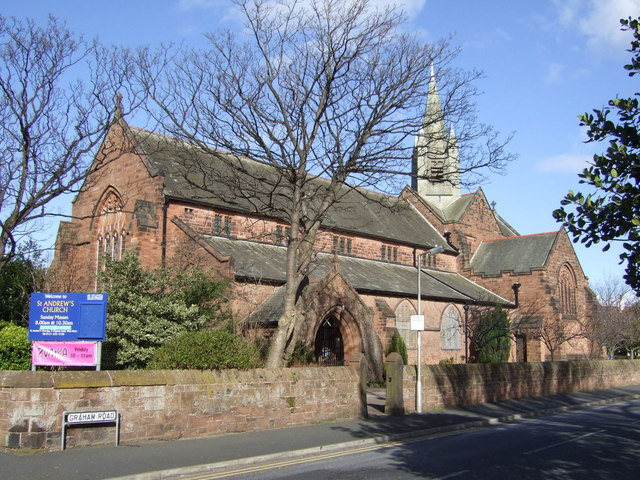
- St Andrew's Church, West Kirby, from the southwest

- Location in Merseyside
- OS grid reference: SJ 212,872
- Location: West Kirby, Wirral, Merseyside
- Country: England
- Denomination: Anglican
- Churchmanship: Traditional Catholic

History
- Status: Parish church
- Dedication: Saint Andrew

Architecture
- Functional status: Active
- Heritage designation: Grade II
- Designated: 20 January 1988
- Architect(s): Douglas and Fordham; Douglas and Minshull
- Architectural type: Church
- Style: Gothic Revival
- Groundbreaking: 1889
- Completed: 1909

Specifications
- Materials: Sandstone, slate roof Slate-hung spire and pinnacles

Administration
- Province: York
- Diocese: Chester
- Archdeaconry: Chester
- Deanery: Wirral North
- Parish: St Andrew, West Kirby

Clergy
- Bishop: The Rt Revd Stephen Race (AEO)
- Vicar: Fr Brian Bell SSC

St Andrew's Church is in Meols Drive, West Kirby, Wirral, Merseyside, England. It is an active Anglican parish church in the diocese of Chester, the archdeaconry of Chester, and the deanery of Wirral North. The church is recorded in the National Heritage List for England as a designated Grade II listed building.

== History ==
This was originally from 1891 a chapel of ease to St Bridget's Church and became a separate parish in 1920. Building of the church began in 1889–91 by Douglas and Fordham and was completed in 1907–09 by Douglas and Minshull.

=== Present day ===
The parish stands in the Traditional Catholic tradition of the Church of England. As it rejects the ordination of women, it receives alternative episcopal oversight from the Bishop of Beverley (currently Stephen Race).

== Architecture ==
=== Exterior ===
The church is built in snecked sandstone with ashlar dressings and has a slate roof. It is cruciform in shape, and its plan consists of a five-bay nave, with a clerestory, north and south aisles, a crossing, north and south transepts, and a chancel. Above the crossing is a tower which is set diagonally on which is a slate-hung spire and four slate-hung pinnacles. The south transept forms a chapel and the north transept holds the organ chamber. At the west end is a four-light window and at the east end a five-light window flanked by niches containing statues. The chancel has embattled parapets.

=== Interior ===
The columns of the arcade are octagonal. The font is also octagonal and it has a timber cover with crocketed pinnacles. In the crossing are the choirstalls, and the chapel to the south has a parclose screen. On the south wall of the chancel are a piscina and a sedilia.The reredos is by Geoffrey Webb, is dated 1911, and contains canopied figures. It is painted and gilded, and described by the authors of the Buildings of England series as "magnificent". In 1928, Arthur Barbosa designed the organ case, pew fronts and six-foot candlesticks. At the west end of the church, dating from 1952, is a canopy forming a baptistry. The stained glass in the south transept, the north aisle and the east window is by Herbert Bryams, a pupil of Kempe. There are also two windows dating from the 1990s by Septimus Waugh.

== See also ==
- Listed buildings in Hoylake
- List of new churches by John Douglas
