= Trena Cox =

British stained glass artist (1895–1980)

Trena Mary Cox
- Born: Emma Trina Cox; 3 March 1895; Bebington, UK
- Died: 11 February 1980 (aged 84); Chester, UK
- Occupation: Stained glass artist

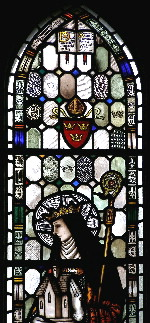
St Etheldreda, a work by Trena Cox in St Stephen, Prenton, Birkenhead

Trena Mary Cox (1895–1980) was an English stained glass artist.

She was born Emma Trina Cox on 3 March 1895, in the Lower Bebington Urban District (i.e. not Bebbington), on the Wirral Peninsula and grew up around Birkenhead. She trained at the Laird School of Art. In 1924 she moved to Chester and set up her studio in Victoria Road Chester, Cheshire, either adjacent to, or within, the Kaleyard works of Williams, Gamon & Co., with whom she remained associated until the Second World War. (Note: Cox's first known stained glass window is in the Chester College (now University) chapel and was installed in October 1924 (Minutes of the Joint Committee, Chester Training College, 15 October 1924). This window has Trena Cox's monogram on it, yet the window was contracted to Williams, Gamon & Co. (The Collegian, Vol 38, No 1, 1925).) In about 1945, Trena Cox moved to 96 Watergate Street, Chester, (Note: Cox exhibited several times in the Walker Gallery Autumn Exhibitions in Liverpool. In the exhibition catalogue for the 1923 Autumn Exhibition, her home address is given as her parents' address in Birkenhead, as it also is for her 1924 exhibit at the Royal Academy in London. However, in the 1924 Walker Gallery Autumn Exhibition catalogue her address is given as being in Chester. Trena Cox moved to 96 Watergate Street at some time around the Second World War. During the years up to and including 1939, electoral registers confirm that she was living at other addresses in Chester. However, by the time of the first electoral register after the war, in May 1945, she had moved to 96 Watergate St. However, she apparently continued using the Victoria Road studio alongside or within the Williams, Gamon & Co. works during the war and until at least 1946, with evidence including, for example, the Kelly's Directory of Cheshire, 1939 (p. 94, p. 584), the Kelly's Chester Directory of 1940 (p. 112) and Chester Area telephone directories in January – February 1945 and March 1946. This suggests that she may not have used her new home as a studio immediately. By the time of the January 1947 telephone directory, however, the only telephone number for Trena Cox is at the Watergate Street address, suggesting a break from the Victoria Road studio.) which remained her home and, at least later, her studio, until she retired in 1972 (at the age of 77) and died, on 11 February 1980 (not in 1977, as frequently quoted). Most of her works are in churches in the old counties of Cheshire and Lancashire. She was a fellow of the British Society of Master Glass Painters. The authors of the Buildings of England series comment that "her windows are usually small, her figures modest, often with small-scale detail in the quarries" (small pieces of square or diamond-shaped glass set diagonally).

Until the publication of Jones (2012), there was very little coherent information available about the life of Trena Cox and errors in some earlier references, concerning, for example, the year of her death, have unfortunately been perpetuated by later authors.

== Selected works ==
Building	Location	Date	Subject, notes and references
Chester College Chapel	Chester, Cheshire; 53.1989°N 2.8966°W	1923, 1933, 1962	A number of windows in the chapel and in its corridor.
Cloister, Chester Cathedral	Chester, Cheshire; 53.1919°N 2.8905°W	1925–27	Eight figures in the southwest corner of the cloister.
Slype, Chester Cathedral	Chester, Cheshire; 53.1919°N 2.8905°W	1927	Saint Christopher.
Church of St Mary and All Saints	Whalley, Lancashire; 53.8241°N 2.4041°W	1928	East window in the north chapel, depicting Saint George, Saint Nicholas, and King Arthur.
Trevor Church	Trevor, Wrexham, Wales; 52.9723°N 3.1065°W	1930	Crucifixion.
St Stephen's Church	Prenton, Birkenhead, Merseyside; 53.3691°N 3.0415°W	1932	Several small windows.
St Michael's Church	Blundellsands, Merseyside; 53.4946°N 3.0433°W	1932; 1933	Annunciation; Saint Christopher.
Church of the Resurrection and All Saints	Caldy, Wirral, Merseyside; 53.3584°N 3.1641°W	1933; 1946	Saint George, Saint Werburgh, Saint Bridget, and Saint Martin.
St Michael's Church	Huyton, Merseyside; 53.4140°N 2.8400°W	1933	Simeon with Jesus; Mary sitting at Jesus' feet.
St Bartholomew's Church	Thurstaston, Wirral. Merseyside; 53.3485°N 3.1321°W	1934; 1951	Two windows.
St Werburgh's Church	Chester, Cheshire; 53.1911°N 2.8824°W	1936	A set of eight small windows in the narthex.
Holy Trinity Church	Lower Beeding, West Sussex; 51.0332°N 0.2610°W	1936	Good Shepherd.
St Michael's Church	Shotwick, Cheshire; 53.2388°N 2.9951°W	1938	Saint Michael.
Chapel of St Mary de Castro, Chester Castle	Chester, Cheshire; 53.1854°N 2.8918°W	1939	A small version of the Mother and Child.
St Matthew's Church	Stretton, Cheshire; 53.3404°N 2.5717°W	1939	West window.
Holy Trinity Church	Bickerton, Cheshire; 53.0769°N 2.7327°W	c. 1940	
Christ Church	Crowton, Cheshire; 53.2664°N 2.6312°W	1946	Mother and Child.
St Oswald's Church	Bidston, Birkenhead, Merseyside; 53.4024°N 3.0671°W	1947	Epiphany.
St Ambrose Church	Widnes, Cheshire; 53.3725°N 2.7123°W	1947	A window given by German prisoners of war, depicting Saint Boniface.
St Matthew's Church	Buckley, Flintshire, Wales; 53.1745°N 3.0726°W	1948	Christ in Glory as a Child in the south wall of the south aisle.
St Lawrence's Church	Stoak, Cheshire; 53.2534°N 2.8654°W	1948	Saint Christopher and Saint George moved here from Christ Church, Chester, in 1997.
St James' Church	Leyland, Lancashire; 53.6900°N 2.7325°W	1949	Saint Michael; Saint George.
St John the Evangelist's Church	Norley, Cheshire; 53.2496°N 2.6579°W	1949	The west window of the north aisle.
Emmanuel Church	Buckley, Flintshire, Wales; 53.1678°N 3.0882°W	1950; 1962	Scenes from the birth and early life of Christ on the south wall.
All Saints Church	Bubwith, East Yorkshire; 53.8170°N 0.9206°W	1951	Te Deum.
Shrine of Our Lady of Walsingham	Walsingham, Norfolk; 52.8947°N 0.8758°E	1955	Annunciation.
St Aiden's Church	Wheatley Hills, Doncaster, South Yorkshire; 53.5364°N 1.0990°W	1957	Vision of St. John on Patmos.
Shrewsbury Cathedral	Shrewsbury, Shropshire; 52.7053°N 2.7540°W	1960	A window with armorial items in the porch.
All Saints' Church	Daresbury, Cheshire; 53.3406°N 2.6312°W	c. 1960	Two windows.
St John the Baptist's Church	Chester, Cheshire; 53.1890°N 2.8856°W	1969	Aethelred and the Hind, in the narthex.
St Mary Magdalen's Church	Tallern Green, Wrexham, Wales; 52.9920°N 2.8273°W	1970	An Angel Greets the Three Women at the Empty Tomb in the south wall of the nave.
Wrexham Cathedral	Wrexham, Wales; 53.0473°N 2.9989°W	1970	Saint Michael and angels on the east wall of the south transept.
The Priory and Parish Church of Saint Mary (Beddgelert)	Beddgelert, Gwynedd, Wales; 53.0111°N 4.1017°W	Undated	Virgin and Child and David on the north wall of the nave.
St Peter's Church	Chester, Cheshire; 53.1904°N 2.8918°W	Undated	On the west side of the church.
St Chad's Church	Farndon, Cheshire; 53.0840°N 2.8774°W	Undated	Three windows.
St James' Church	Ince, Cheshire; 53.2813°N 2.8266°W	Undated	Saint Francis and Saint Werburgh.
St Michael and All Angels Church	Little Leigh, Cheshire; 53.2790°N 2.5783°W	Undated	
St Stephen's Church	Moulton, Cheshire; 53.2227°N 2.5168°W	Undated	Two west windows and two in the north aisle.
Holy Trinity Church	Northwich, Cheshire; 53.2577°N 2.5188°W	Undated	Christmas scenes.
St Trillo's Chapel	Rhos-on-Sea, Conwy, Wales; 53.3144°N 3.7406°W	Undated	Saint Elian in the south wall.
Holy Cross Church	Woodchurch, Birkenhead, Merseyside; 53.3725°N 3.0892°W	Undated	A window in the north aisle.
