= Hill Bark Farmhouse =

Coordinates: 53.3645°N 3.1307°W

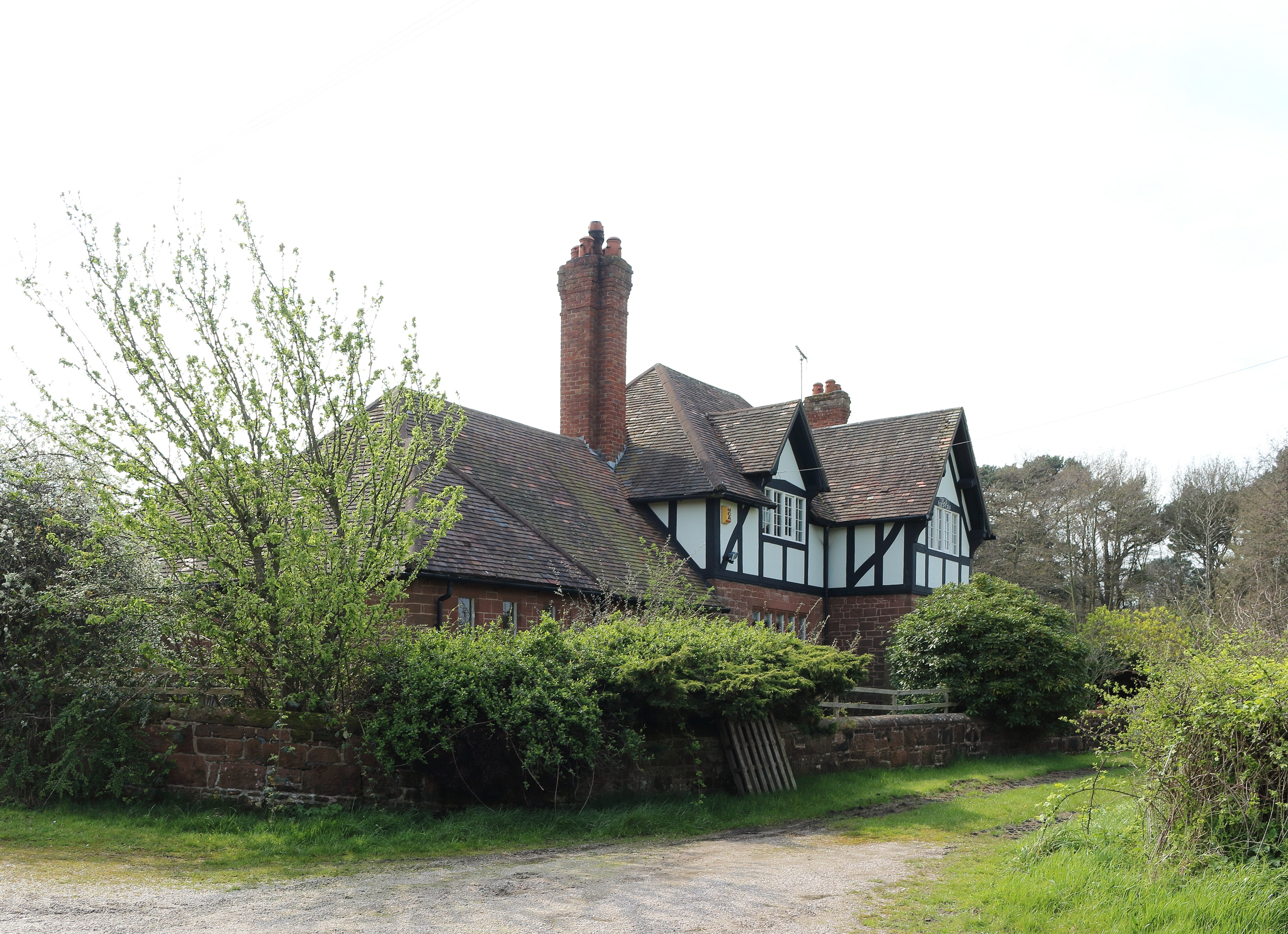
View from the southwest

Hill Bark Farmhouse is to the east of the house of Hill Bark, and south of the hamlet of Frankby, Wirral, England. It is recorded in the National Heritage List for England as a designated Grade II listed building.

The farmhouse was built in 1875 for Septimus Ledward and designed by the Chester architect John Douglas. It was part of a model farm for Hill Bark. The house is constructed in stone with some timber-framing and has a tiled roof. It is built in five bays, three of which have two storeys and the other two are single-storey. At the rear is a round-ended projecting bay. Outbuildings constructed at the same time, designed by Douglas, are also listed at Grade II.

== See also ==
- Listed buildings in Hoylake
- List of houses and associated buildings by John Douglas
