= Listed buildings in Prenton =

Prenton is a suburb of Birkenhead, Wirral, Merseyside, England. It contains seven buildings that are recorded in the National Heritage List for England as designated listed buildings, all of which are listed at Grade II. This grade is the lowest of the three gradings given to listed buildings and is applied to "buildings of national importance and special interest". Originally a rural area, since the 1920s it has been developed for residential use. Four of the listed buildings are former farmhouses and farm buildings that have been adapted for other uses, and the others are a church and two war memorials.

Name and location	Photograph	Date	Notes
Prenton Hall (West); 53.36498°N 3.05145°W		17th century	Part of a former farmhouse that was remodelled in the 18th century and later divided. It is in stone with a roughcast left side, and has a Welsh slate roof. The house is in two storeys, with two gables, each containing an oculus, facing the road. The entrance is on this front, above it is an entablature, and to the right is a four-light mullioned window. The other windows are sashes.
Lower Farmhouse; 53.36428°N 3.05227°W		Late 18th century	Originally a farmhouse, the house is in painted brick with a Welsh slate roof. It has 2 1/2 storeys and three bays. The central doorway has an entablature on brackets, and the windows are sashes.
Barn, Lower Farm; 53.36442°N 3.05246°W		Late 18th century	Originally a barn and stable, later converted into a public house and restaurant. It is in stone with a Welsh slate roof. The entrance bay projects forward, and to the right is an added gabled porch. Further to the right are the former stables, containing three doors, two windows, and ventilation slots.
Prenton Hall (East); 53.36504°N 3.05129°W		Late 18th century	Part of a former farmhouse, later divided, in stone with a Welsh slate roof, it is in two and three storeys. The main block has a pedimented gable with an oculus facing the road, and attached to it is a lower block containing a doorway, a sash window, and a blind window. The main block also has sash windows and at its rear is a lower roughcast extension.
St Stephen's Church; 53.36910°N 3.04145°W		1896–97	The church was designed by C. E. Deacon in Gothic style, and was completed in 1908–09 by Deacon and Horsburgh. It is in stone, with brick internally, and has a tiled roof. The church consists of a nave, aisles, a chancel, and projecting east chapels. The windows are lancets, some of which are stepped and grouped under pointed arches.
Prenton War Memorial; 53.36798°N 3.04402°W		1920	The war memorial is set in a garden and is in Yorkshire sandstone. It has a two-stepped coped plinth on which is an octagonal structure with three tiers diminishing in size and with elaborate carving. On the top is a Celtic cross and urns on the corners. On the bottom tier are slate plaques with inscriptions and the names of those lost in the First World War. The middle tier contains panels with open tracery, and the top tier has panels containing bas-relief.
Mercantile Marine War Memorial; 53.36772°N 3.04414°W		1930s	The war memorial is in granite and is in the form of a drinking fountain. It consists of four blocks of stone, the bottom one being a shaped plinth. The other blocks have carved rope moulding on the corners, and on the south face is a bowl in the form of a ship's prow. On the rear is an inscription commemorating the service of the Mercantile Marine in the First World War, above which is a carved roundel. In recognition of that service 'rendered to the Empire for many centuries, both in peace and in war', HM King George V conferred upon the Mercantile Marine the title 'Merchant Navy' on 14 February 1928 in appointing HRH Edward, Prince of Wales, as the first Master of the Merchant Navy and Fishing Fleets.

== See also ==
- Listed buildings in Noctorum (defined by postcode (only) as being in Prenton; otherwise within Birkenhead)
