= Prenton Brook =

Brook in Wirral, England

Coordinates: 53.3623°N 3.065°W

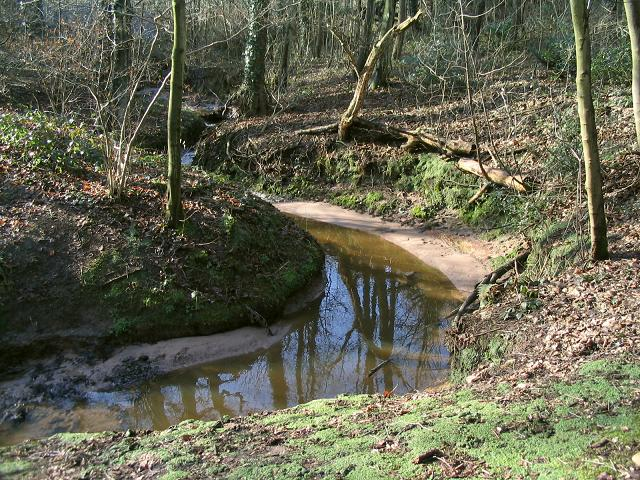
Prenton Brook at Barnston Dale.

Prenton Brook is a tributary of the River Fender, in Wirral, Merseyside. The brook starts as field drainage east of Thingwall and flows through Barnston Dale. Prenton Brook joins the River Fender at Prenton. The River Fender then joins the Birket at Leasowe. The Birket discharges into the West Float at the site of the former Wallasey Pool, which itself discharges into the River Mersey. Prenton Brook is about 2 miles (3.2 km) long.
