= St Matthew's Church, Stretton =

Coordinates: 53.3404°N 2.5717°W

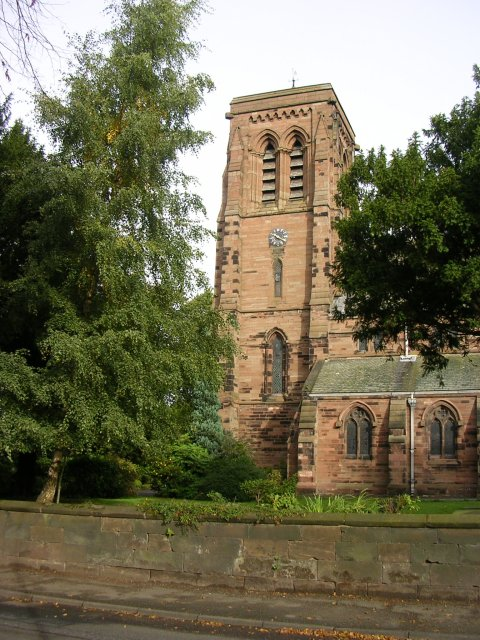
- Tower of St Matthew's Church, Stretton

- Location in Cheshire
- OS grid reference: SJ 620 827
- Location: Stretton, Cheshire
- Country: England
- Denomination: Anglican
- Website: St Matthew, Stretton

History
- Status: Parish church
- Dedication: St Matthew

Architecture
- Functional status: Active
- Heritage designation: Grade II
- Designated: 8 January 1970
- Architect: Sir George Gilbert Scott
- Architectural type: Church
- Style: Gothic Revival
- Completed: 1870

Specifications
- Materials: Red sandstone, Westmorland slate roofs

Administration
- Province: York
- Diocese: Chester
- Archdeaconry: Chester
- Deanery: Great Budworth
- Parish: Stretton

Clergy
- Vicar: Rev Alan David John JEWELL

St Matthew's Church is in the village of Stretton, Cheshire, England. The church is recorded in the National Heritage List for England as a designated Grade II listed building. It is an active Anglican parish church in the diocese of Chester, the archdeaconry of Chester and the deanery of Great Budworth. Its benefice is combined with that of St Cross, Appleton Thorn.

== History ==
From the reign of Henry II, the village of Stretton was owned by the Starkey family and it is likely that a chapel was built for the family during the 13th or 14th century. In a will dated 1527 the chapel is referred to as the Oratory of St Saviour. In Leycester's history of Cheshire it is stated that in 1666 the "ancient chapel of Stretton" was "ruinous and in decay". In 1826–27 a Commissioners' Church was built as a chapel of ease to Great Budworth. It was designed by Philip Hardwick and accommodated 250 people. In 1859 Richard Greenall, vicar and Archdeacon of Chester, commissioned George Gilbert Scott to build a chancel, which he did. Richard Greenall died suddenly in 1867, and following this the rest of the church was rebuilt as a memorial to him, Scott again being the architect.

== Architecture ==
=== Exterior ===
The church is built in red sandstone with Westmorland slate roofs. The plan consists of a five-bay nave with a clerestory, north and south aisles, a two-bay chancel, a north vestry and a west tower. The tower is in three stages with angle buttresses, an octagonal northeast turret, paired bell-openings and a corbelled plain parapet.

On the west and south sides of the tower are clock faces which since 1963 have letter mottoes rather than numbers. The Vicar, the Reverend Thomas E. N. Pennell, asked his Churchwarden, Mr Wallace Miln, to think up a few twelve letter mottos that might be suitable. Mr Miln produced over 80. They chose “Time is not all” and “Forget not God”.

There was originally a ring of six bells which were dated 1850. They were re-hung in 1920 and again in 1987. In 2003 two additional bells were cast, making a total ring of eight. The original bells were made by Charles and George Mears at the Whitechapel Bell Foundry, and the later bells were cast by John Taylor Bellfounders.

=== Interior ===
The west door screen, dated 1982, is made of oak and is by Hayes and Finch of Liverpool. The roof of the nave is of red deal and the pews are oak. The font, which dates from 1867, is in stone with a carved oak canopy. The pulpit was designed by Scott and installed in 1859. The tiles in the sanctuary are thought to be Minton encaustic tiles; the tiles elsewhere in the church are black and red.

The organ was built by Henry Willis and installed in 1876. Additional stops were added to the organ in the early 1920s. The frontal of the altar and the reredos were made of carved oak by E. H. Sankey in 1957. The east window was designed and made by Trena Cox and dedicated in 1939. Much of the rest of the stained glass in the church is by Clayton and Bell.

== External features ==
In the churchyard is a war memorial which consists of a stone cross, approximately 15 feet (5 m) high, on an octagonal base which was consecrated in 1923. The churchyard also contains the war graves of three soldiers of World War I, and an airman of World War II. The lych gate dates from 1889. The cross on its roof was cut off in 1961 because of an infestation of death watch beetle.

== See also ==
- List of new churches by George Gilbert Scott in Northern England
- Listed buildings in Stretton, Warrington
