= Benjamin Dabbs =

English footballer

Ben Dabbs
Personal information
- Date of birth: 17 April 1909
- Place of birth: Oakengates, England
- Date of death: 30 December 2000 (aged 91)
- Position: Left-back

Senior career*
Years	Team	Apps	(Gls)
1930–32	Oakengates Town		
1932–38	Liverpool	56	(0)
1938–46	Watford		
- * Club domestic league appearances and goals

Benjamin Edwin Dabbs (17 April 1909 – 30 December 2000) was an English footballer who played as a full-back defender for Liverpool in The Football League.

Born at Oakengates, Shropshire, Dabbs started his career at Oakengates Town in 1926 before he signed for Liverpool in 1932. During his first two seasons at the latter club he only made 3 appearances, however the following two seasons saw him play 45 times. After these two seasons he was unable to establish himself in the first team and moved to Watford in 1938.

Although he was on the Watford books until 1946, his last play was in three Southern League appearances in the incomplete 1939–40 season which was cut short by the Second World War. In 1949-50 he was team coach with Rickmansworth Town.

Dabbs, who lived at Prenton, Birkenhead, at the time of his transfer to Watford, made his lifelong home at Croxley Green, Hertfordshire, until he moved into a care home shortly before his death at Chelmsford, Essex, in December 2000, aged 91.
