= Congregational Church, Hoylake =

Coordinates: 53.3900°N 3.1805°W

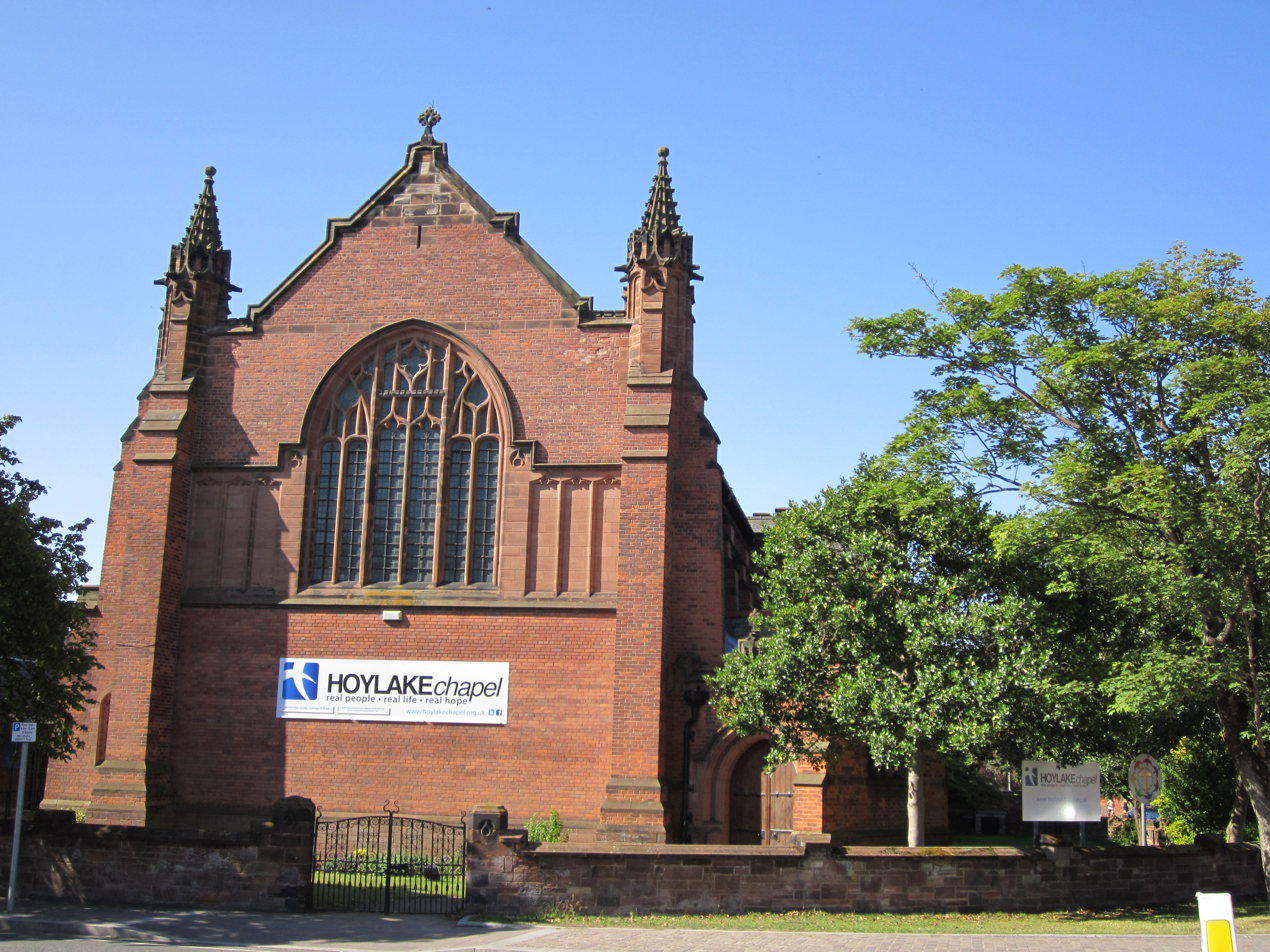
- West end of the Congregational Church, Hoylake

- Location in Merseyside
- OS grid reference: SJ 216 888
- Location: Station Road, Hoylake, Wirral, Merseyside
- Country: England
- Denomination: Independent Evangelical
- Website: Hoylake chapel

History
- Status: Independent

Architecture
- Functional status: Active
- Heritage designation: Grade II
- Designated: 28 January 1991
- Architect: Douglas and Minshull
- Architectural type: Church
- Style: Gothic Revival
- Groundbreaking: 1905
- Completed: 1906

Specifications
- Materials: Brick and sandstone Slate roofs

The Congregational Church is in Station Road, Hoylake, Wirral, Merseyside, England. It is recorded in the National Heritage List for England as a designated Grade II listed building.

== History ==
The church was built in 1905–06, and designed by the Chester architects Douglas and Minshull. It was originally a Congregational church. As of 2017 it is an independent evangelical church now known as Hope Church Wirral.

== Architecture ==
=== Exterior ===
Constructed in red brick with sandstone dressings and standing on a sandstone plinth, the church is roofed with Westmorland slates. Its plan consists of a five-bay nave with a clerestory, north and south aisles, a southwest porch, north and south transepts, and an apse at the east end. It originally had a flèche over the crossing, but this was damaged in the Second World War, and has not been replaced. At the west end is a six-light window containing Perpendicular tracery. This is flanked by buttresses, and on the corners are crocketed pinnacles. The clerestory contains three-light windows, and along the sides of the aisles are lancet windows. In the apse are two and three-light windows.

=== Interior ===
The interior of the church is clad in sandstone, and has a hammerbeam roof. The floor at the east end of the church is in black and white marble. The font consists of a curved bowl on four large buttresses. The furnishings were made by James Merritt, and include simple benches and an elaborate pulpit. The stained glass in the windows at the east end, dating from 1922, is by H. G. Hiller, and there are two windows in the aisles by A. J. Davies dating from the 1920s. The three-manual pipe organ was made by Hope-Jones, and subsequently cleaned and altered by Norman and Beard.

== See also ==
- Listed buildings in Hoylake
