= Church of St John the Divine, Frankby =

Coordinates: 53.3747°N 3.1332°W

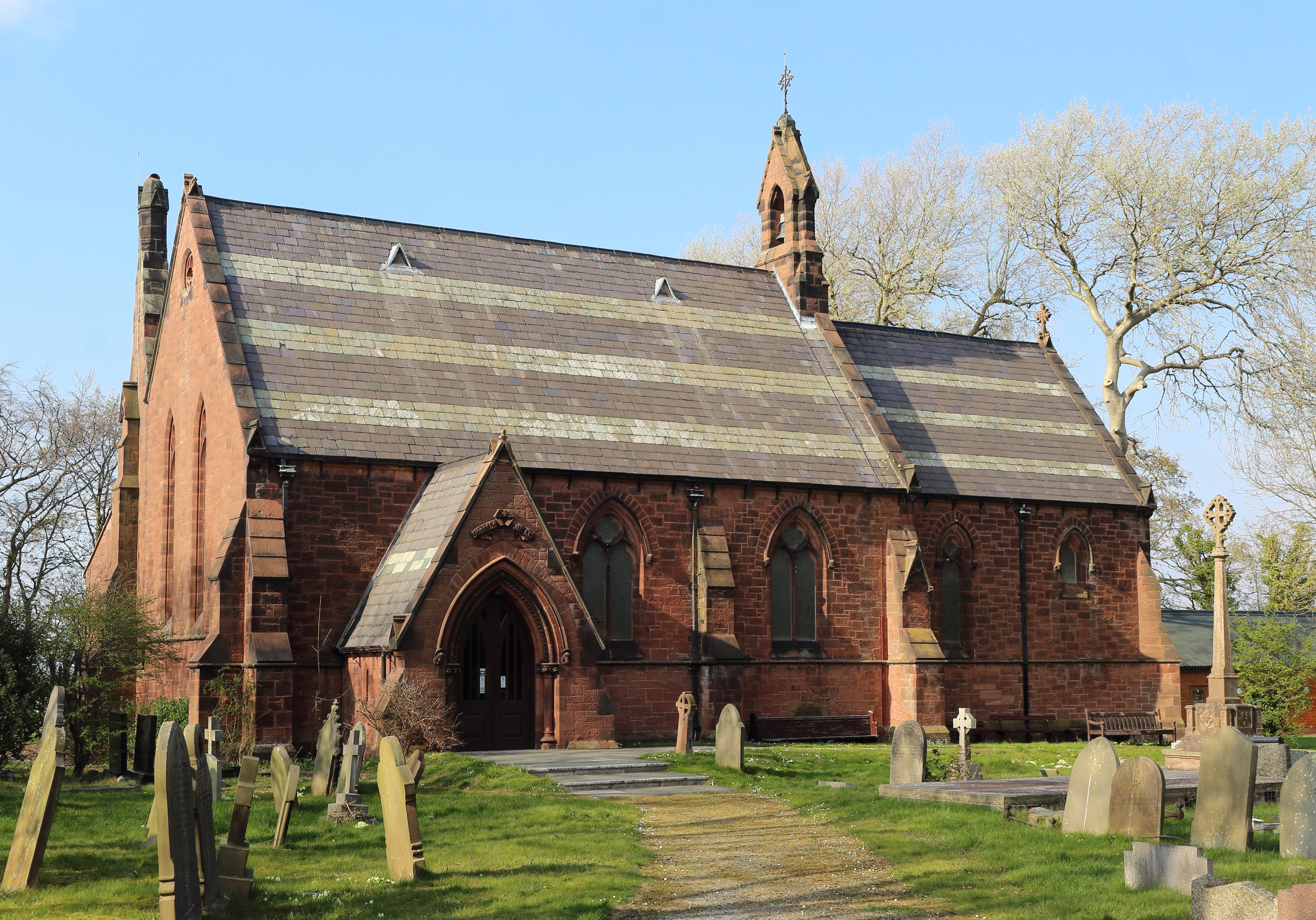
- Church of St John the Divine, Frankby, from the south

- Location in Merseyside
- Location: Frankby Road, Frankby, Wirral, Merseyside
- Country: England
- Denomination: Anglican
- Churchmanship: Evangelical
- Website: St John The Divine, Frankby

History
- Status: Parish church

Architecture
- Functional status: Active
- Heritage designation: Grade II
- Designated: 20 January 1988
- Architect(s): W. and J. Hay
- Architectural type: Church
- Style: Gothic Revival
- Groundbreaking: 1861
- Completed: 1862

Specifications
- Materials: Stone, slate roof

Administration
- Province: York
- Diocese: Chester
- Archdeaconry: Chester
- Deanery: Wirral, North
- Parish: St John the Divine, Frankby, with St Nicholas, Greasby

Clergy
- Vicar: Revd Simon Stride

The Church of St John the Divine, is in Frankby Road, Frankby, Wirral, Merseyside, England. It is a lively and active Anglican parish church in the deanery of Wirral North, the archdeaconry of Chester and the diocese of Chester. It is informal and evangelical in worship style combining some elements of tradition, contemporary music and culture. Its benefice is united with that of St Nicholas, Greasby. The church is recorded in the National Heritage List for England as a designated Grade II listed building.

== History ==
The church was built in 1861–62, and was designed by W. and J. Hay.

== Architecture ==
=== Exterior ===
St John's is built in stone and has slate roofs with bands of different colours. It consists of a three-bay nave with a south porch, a north aisle, a chancel, and a north vestry. There is a bellcote on the east gable of the nave. Along the walls of the nave are buttresses and two-light windows containing Geometric tracery, and along the wall of the aisle are paired windows. The east window has three lights.

=== Interior ===
Inside the church the arcade is carried on round columns. The chancel arch has corbels, one of which is carved with a sower. There are four chandeliers. The font is round with interlaced blind tracery. On the wall is a dole cupboard. The pulpit has canted ends and it contains a canopied niche. The organ case and pipes are painted, as is the panelled chancel ceiling. On the east wall of the chancel is panelling, and to the south is a double sedilia. In the north aisle are three windows with stained glass of 1873 depicting Old Testament figures. These were made by Morris & Co., and were designed by Edward Burne-Jones. There are two windows by C. E. Kempe dated 1870 and 1871, and the rest are by Clayton and Bell. The two-manual pipe organ was made by H. Wedlake of London.

== See also ==
- Listed buildings in Hoylake
