= Church of the Resurrection and All Saints, Caldy =

Coordinates: 53.3584°N 3.1641°W

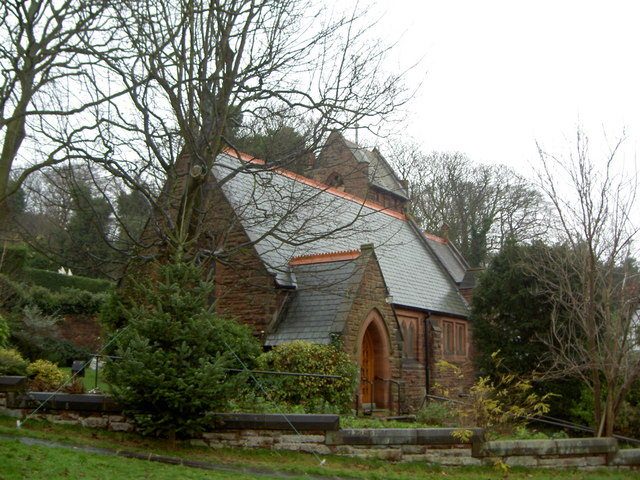
- Church of the Resurrection and All Saints, Caldy

- Location in Merseyside
- OS grid reference: SJ 226,853
- Location: Caldy, Wirral, Merseyside
- Country: England
- Denomination: Anglican
- Churchmanship: Liberal Modern Catholic
- Website: St Bridget, West Kirby

History
- Status: Daughter church
- Consecrated: 1907

Architecture
- Functional status: Active
- Heritage designation: Grade II
- Designated: 20 January 1988
- Architect(s): G. E. Street; Douglas and Minshull
- Architectural type: Church
- Style: Gothic Revival
- Groundbreaking: 1868
- Completed: 1907

Administration
- Province: York
- Diocese: Chester
- Archdeaconry: Chester
- Deanery: Wirral North
- Parish: West Kirby

Clergy
- Rector: Revd Alex Williams

The Church of the Resurrection and All Saints is in the village of Caldy, Wirral, Merseyside, England. The church is recorded in the National Heritage List for England as a designated Grade II listed building. It is an active Anglican church in the diocese of Chester, the archdeaconry of Chester and the deanery of Wirral North. It is a daughter church of St Bridget's Church, West Kirby.

== History ==
This was built originally as a school to a design by G. E. Street in 1868 at the expense of Elizabeth Barton. It was converted to a church, with the addition of a chancel, a north aisle and a saddleback tower in 1906–07 by Douglas and Minshull. The church was refurbished in the 1960s.

== Architecture ==
=== Exterior ===
The church is built in rock-faced stone with ashlar dressings. The roof is of slate with tiles on the crest. The plan consists of a nave with a north aisle, a baptistry and a south porch, a chancel with a north vestry and a saddleback tower at the northeast.

=== Interior ===
Many of the furnishings are by Kempe and were taken from the chapel of Caldy Manor which was dismantled when the church was built. These include the choir stalls and the reredos. The reredos has panels of marquetry depicting the crucifixion. Some of the stained glass in the church is by Kempe and the southwest window is by A. J. Davies of the Bromsgrove Guild. The west window is by Trena Cox. The church contains many memorials to the Barton family. In the vestry is a fireplace with a coat of arms dated 1868. The two-manual organ was built by Henry Willis & Sons.

== See also ==
- Listed buildings in Hoylake
- List of church restorations, amendments and furniture by John Douglas
