= Teddy Barton =

English footballer

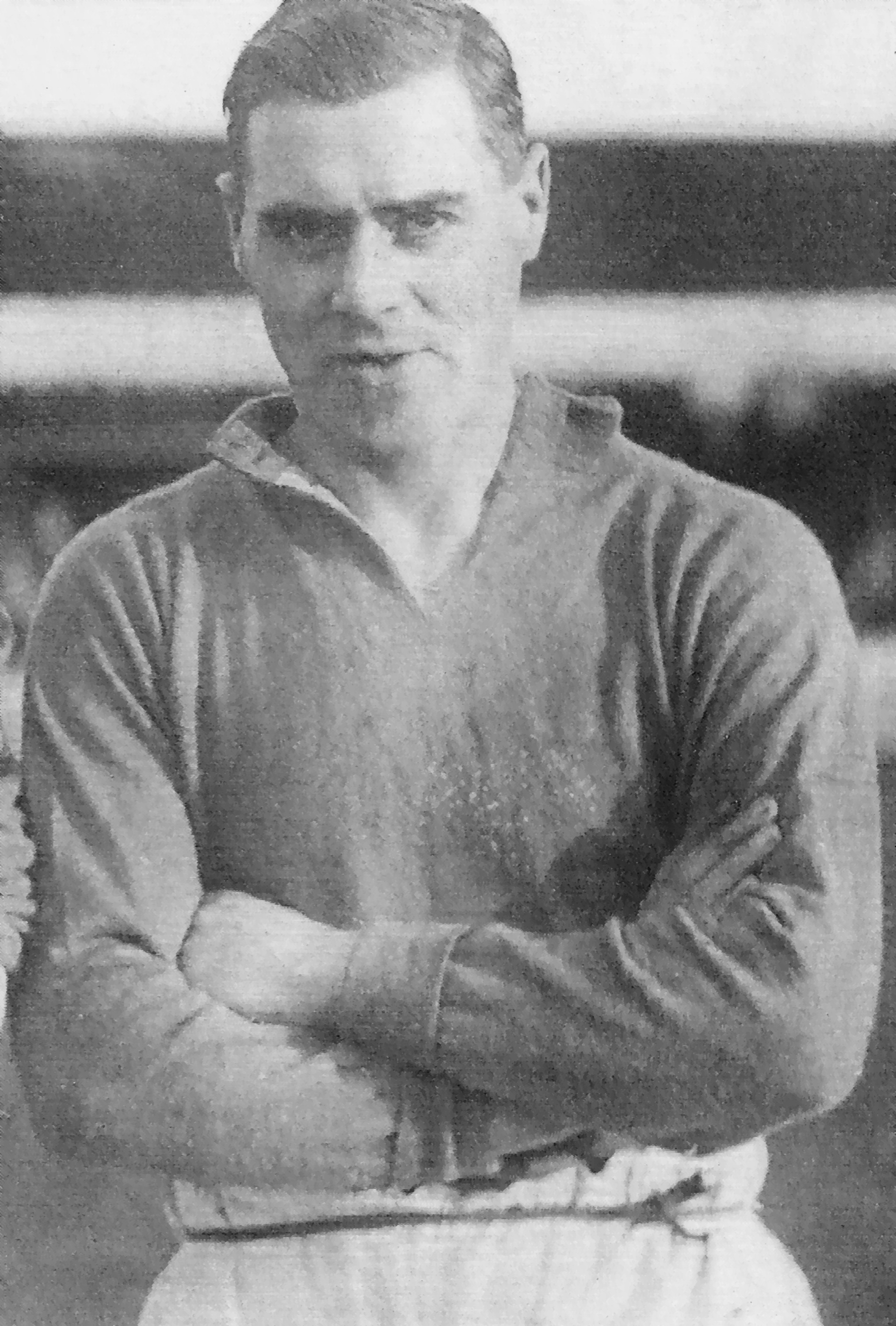
- Barton in 1935

Personal information
- Full name: Edward Victor Barton
- Date of birth: 1 January 1904
- Place of birth: West Derby, Liverpool, Lancashire, England
- Date of death: 13 November 1941 (aged 37)
- Place of death: Thingwall, Cheshire, England
- Position: Right half

Senior career*
Years	Team	Apps	(Gls)
?–1925	Everton	?	(?)
1925–1935	Tranmere Rovers	237	(5)
- * Club domestic league appearances and goals

Edward Victor Barton (1 January 1904 – 13 November 1941) was an English footballer who played as a right half for Everton and Tranmere Rovers.

He was most remember for his long career at Tranmere, making 260 appearances for the club and scoring 5 goals.

Barton later lived in Prenton, Cheshire, and was survived by his wife, Alice Elizabeth. He died in 1941 at only 37 years old, after suffering from an illness for several months.
