= St Stephen's Church, Prenton =

Coordinates: 53.3691°N 3.0415°W

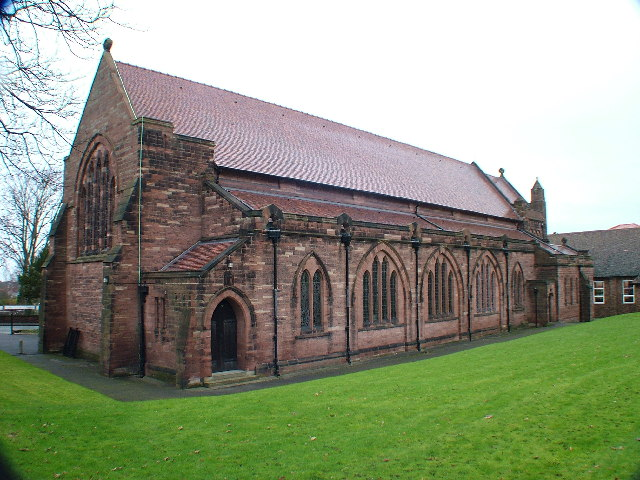
- St Stephen's Church, Prenton, from the southwest

- Location in Merseyside
- OS grid reference: SJ 308 863
- Location: Prenton Lane, Prenton, Birkenhead, Wirral, Merseyside
- Country: England
- Denomination: Anglican
- Churchmanship: Evangelical

History
- Status: Parish church

Architecture
- Functional status: Active
- Heritage designation: Grade II
- Designated: 28 March 1974
- Architect(s): C. E. Deacon; Deacon and Horsburgh
- Architectural type: Church
- Style: Gothic Revival
- Groundbreaking: 1896
- Completed: 1909

Specifications
- Materials: Sandstone, tiled roofs

Administration
- Province: York
- Diocese: Chester
- Archdeaconry: Chester
- Deanery: Birkenhead
- Parish: St Stephen, Prenton

Clergy
- Vicar: Revd Matt Graham

St Stephen's Church is in Prenton Lane, Prenton, Birkenhead, Wirral, Merseyside, England. It is an active Anglican parish church in the deanery of Birkenhead, the archdeaconry of Chester, and the diocese of Chester. The church is recorded in the National Heritage List for England as a designated Grade II listed building.

== History ==
The church was built in two phases. The first phase was in 1896–97, it was designed by C. E. Deacon, and comprised the four western bays of the nave and the porches. The second phase came in 1908–09, by Deacon and Horsburgh, when another bay was added to the nave, and the chancel and vestries were built. A tower and spire were planned above the west bay of the chancel, but these were never built.

== Architecture ==
=== Exterior ===
St Stephen's is constructed in sandstone, and is in Gothic Revival style. The internal walls are in brick, and the roofs are tiled. Its plan consists of a nave with north and south aisles under lean-to roofs, projecting chapels at the east of the aisles, a chancel, and vestries. The west window has five lights. Along the walls of the aisles are groups of stepped lancet windows, two in the west and east bays, and four in the intermediate bays, and doorways towards the western ends. At the east end are buttresses with pyramidal roofs, and the east window consists of five stepped lancets.

=== Interior ===
Inside the church the four-bay arcades are carried on square chamfered piers with capitals carved with foliage. The arches are plain and chamfered. The chancel arch is sharply pointed, and its capitals are carved with angels. In the chancel is a brick sedilia with putti in terracotta. The southeast chapel has a painted ceiling and fittings dating from 1970 designed by Dykes Bower. The reredos, altar, stalls, and pulpit were designed by Deacon and carved by Harry Hems. The chapel screen of 1949 was designed by Bernard Miller and painted by Martin Bell. The stained glass in the east window is in the form of a war memorial; it dates from 1926 and is by Powells. There is also a window of 1927 by Powells in the chapel. In the south aisle are windows by Trena Cox, one of 1970 by A. V. Holloway, and a Millennium window by J. Lawson. The glass in the west window dates from 1973. The pipe organ was made in 1899 by P. Conacher, and restored in 1909 by Gray and Davison. This has been superseded by a Makin electronic organ.

== Appraisal ==
The church was designated as a Grade II listed building on 28 March 1974 Grade II is the lowest of the three grades of listing and is applied to "buildings of national importance and special interest". Hartwell et al. in the Buildings of England series comment that it is a "grand church, noble in size, original in design and excellent in its fitting-out".

== See also ==
- Listed buildings in Prenton
