= St Bridget's Church, West Kirby =

Coordinates: 53.3687°N 3.1763°W

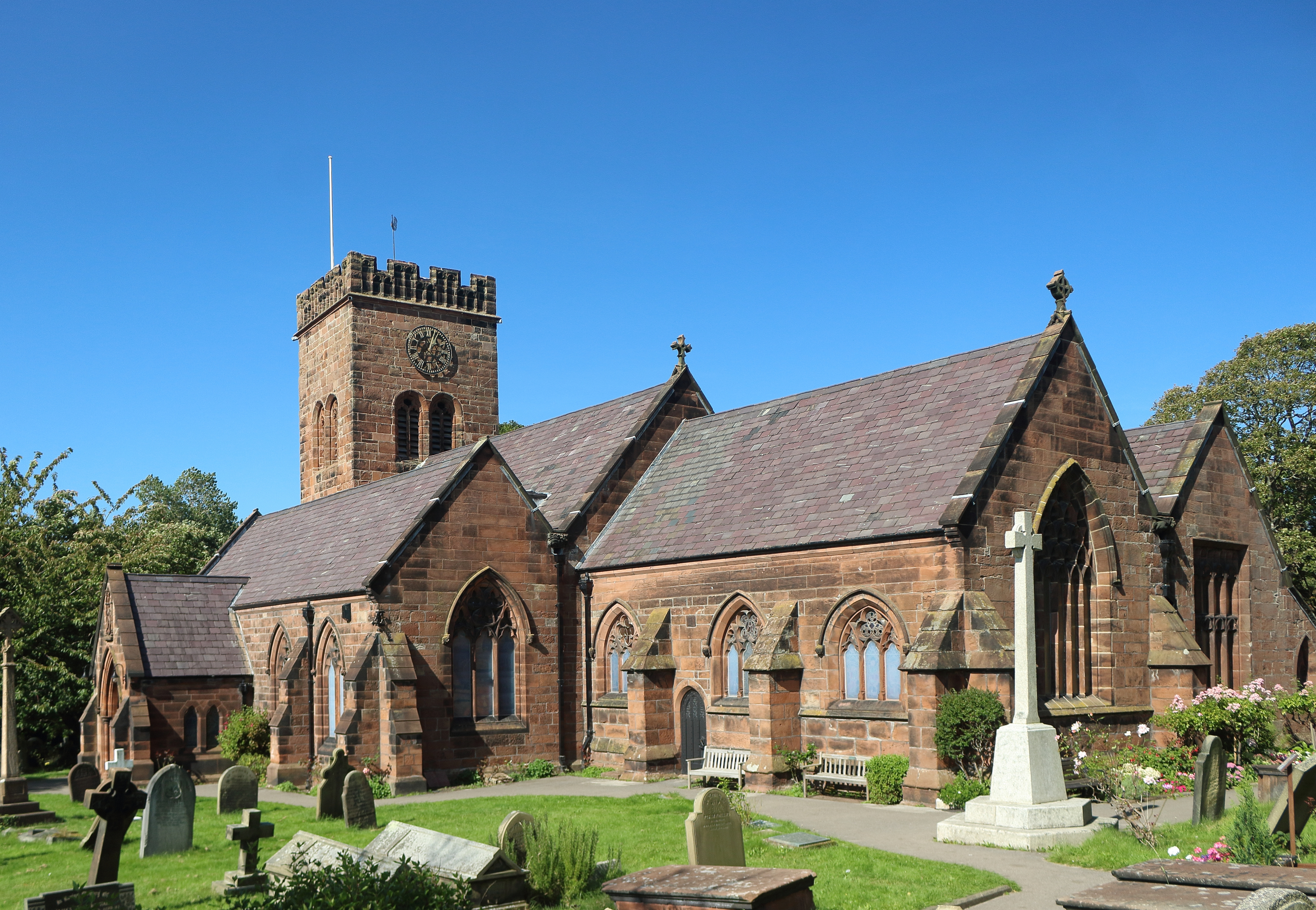
- St Bridget's Church, West Kirby, from the southeast

- Location in Merseyside
- OS grid reference: SJ 218 864
- Location: West Kirby, Wirral, Merseyside
- Country: England
- Denomination: Anglican
- Churchmanship: Liberal Modern Catholic
- Website: stbridgetschurch.org.uk

History
- Status: Parish church

Architecture
- Functional status: Active
- Heritage designation: Grade II
- Designated: 5 June 1953
- Architect(s): Kelly and Edwards
- Architectural type: Church
- Style: Gothic Revival
- Completed: 1876

Specifications
- Materials: Stone, slate roof

Administration
- Province: York
- Diocese: Chester
- Archdeaconry: Chester
- Deanery: Wirral North
- Parish: West Kirby

Clergy
- Rector: Revd Alexandra Williams

St Bridget's Church is in the town of West Kirby, Wirral, Merseyside, England. It is an active Anglican parish church in the diocese of Chester, the archdeaconry of Chester and the deanery of Wirral North. Its benefice includes the daughter Church of the Resurrection and All Saints, Caldy. The church is recorded in the National Heritage List for England as a designated Grade II listed building.

== History ==
It is likely that there was a church on the site before the Norman Conquest. The first stone church was built around 1150–60. In the 13th century there were alterations or a rebuilding. Around 1320 the present chancel was built, followed by the north chapel and vestry. In 1493 the tower was erected and the north aisle was widened. By 1788 the church was "in a dilapidated state" and repairs were carried out. A major restoration took place in 1869–70 by Kelly and Edwards which amounted almost to a rebuilding. A north porch was added in 1876.

=== Present day ===
The church falls into the Anglo-Catholic tradition of the Church of England, being described as "moderate catholic" and "Liberal Modern Catholic". The parish is a member of Inclusive Church.

== Architecture ==
=== Exterior ===
The church is built in sandstone with a slate roof. Its plan consists of a west tower, a nave, north and south aisles, a chancel, a north chapel and a vestry. The chancel is not in line with the nave and it inclines to the north. The tower has a west door above which is a three-light Perpendicular window. The bell openings are paired and have two lights. A clock face is on the east side. The summit is embattled and has a gilded weathervane dated 1757. The porch has head-stops which represent Queen Victoria and Bishop William Jacobson. At the west end of the north aisle is a gargoyle representing Gladstone and Disraeli.

=== Interior ===
In the south wall of the chancel are a sedilia and a piscina. The chancel arch has a low wrought iron screen by Kempe and above the arch is a painting also by Kempe. The circular font dates from the 19th century. The altar and the timber reredos are made from re-used wood from the roof of Chester Cathedral. The organ loft is by Douglas and Fordham. The organ was built in 1893 by Henry Willis & Sons and improved by the same firm in 1950. The east window of the chancel is dated 1833. 19 of the 23 windows in the church are by Kempe, and are dated between 1870 and 1906–07. In the church are a number of ancient stones, one of which is known as the Hogback stone. This dates from the early 11th century, the name Hogback referring to its curving shape. It consists of hard grey sandstone, not a type of stone found locally. There is a ring of eight bells. Four of these are dated 1719 by Abraham Rudhall II, one dated 1854 is by Bathgate & Wilson and the other three, dated 1889, are by John Taylor & Co. The parish registers date from 1561 but are incomplete. The churchwardens' accounts start in 1754.

== External features ==
The churchyard contains the war graves of eleven Commonwealth service personnel, nine of World War I and two of World War II.

== See also ==
- Listed buildings in Hoylake
