= Prenton =

Suburb of Birkenhead, Merseyside, England

Coordinates: 53.3721°N 3.0385°W

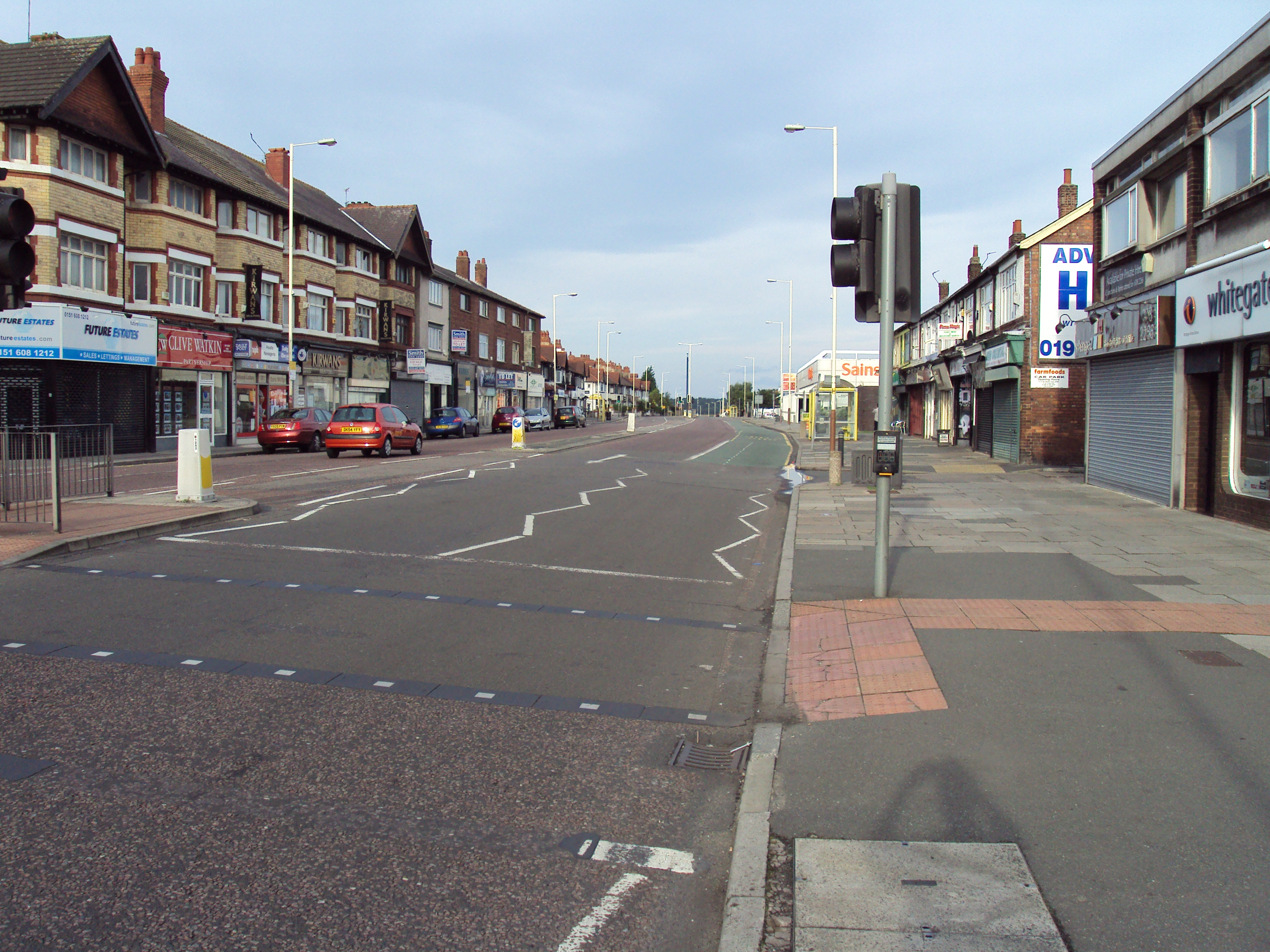
- Shops on the A552 road in Prenton

- Location within Merseyside
- Population: 14,488 (2011 census Ward population)
- OS grid reference: SJ310866
  - London: 178 mi (286 km) SE
- Metropolitan borough: Wirral
- Metropolitan county: Merseyside
- Region: North West
- Country: England
- Sovereign state: United Kingdom
- Post town: PRENTON
- Postcode district: CH43
- Dialling code: 0151
- ISO 3166 code: GB-WRL
- Police: Merseyside
- Fire: Merseyside
- Ambulance: North West
- UK Parliament: Birkenhead

Prenton is a suburb of Birkenhead, Merseyside, England. Administratively, it is also a ward of the Metropolitan Borough of Wirral. Before local government reorganisation on 1 April 1974, it was part of the County Borough of Birkenhead, within the county of Cheshire. Situated in the east of the Wirral Peninsula, the area is contiguous with Oxton to the north, Tranmere and Rock Ferry to the east and Higher Bebington to the south east. The M53 motorway marks the western boundary.

At the 2001 census, the population of Prenton was 14,429. The population of the ward increased slightly to 14,488 in the 2011 census.

== History ==
Prenton appears as Prestune in the Domesday Book of 1086, with the name Pren-ton persisting despite the Norman-French accented spelling. Domesday records the presence of a water mill at Prenton, and this has been provisionally identified at Prenton Dell. The Domesday survey also describes Prenton as having a one-league square woodland - which is 9 sq mi (23 km^{2}), if the league is taken in its old English measurement of 3 mi (4.8 km).

The size and importance of the wood may reflect the name of the settlement. Pren is Welsh (British) for the material 'wood' and in the name Prenton there is the Saxon suffix tún for a settlement, which suggests a settlement in a wood. The Welsh/British name for Prenton would thus be Prentre which could easily have changed into Prenton following Anglian penetration of the area in the early seventh century. Note that Landican (one mile distant from Prenton) retained its Welsh/British name even through Anglian and subsequent Norse occupation. Another explanation for the origins of the name is Praen is an Old English personal noun, with Praen-tún meaning "Praen's farm/settlement".

The name has been variously spelt over time as Prenton (1260), Prempton (1620) and Printon (1642).

Until significant residential development from the beginning of the twentieth century, Prenton remained a rural hamlet centred around Prenton Hall, in the south west of the current suburban area. This was the seat of the former lords of the manor, a title which has passed through several families since the reign of Edward III. It was described as being "in a sheltered dingle, surrounded with trees of large growth". The former Prenton Hall was eventually abandoned and replaced by a large farmhouse of the same name in the seventeenth century.

In August 1940, during the Second World War, a house maid working in Prenton became the first fatality of a bombing raid on the Merseyside area.

=== Civic history ===
Previously a township in Woodchurch parish, Wirral Hundred, Prenton was a civil parish from 1866 to 1 April 1933 when it was added to Birkenhead civil parish. The population was recorded at 81 in 1801, 99 in 1851, 412 in 1901 and 2032 in 1931. By 1928 local government responsibility for Prenton changed from Wirral Rural District to the County Borough of Birkenhead. On 1 April 1974, local government reorganisation in England and Wales resulted in most of the Wirral Peninsula, including Prenton, transfer from Cheshire to the nascent county of Merseyside.

== Geography ==
Prenton is situated on the eastern side of the Wirral Peninsula, about 2.5 km (1.6 mi) west of the River Mersey at Tranmere Oil Terminal. The area is approximately 6.5 km (4 mi) south-south-east of the Irish Sea at Wallasey and about 7.5 km (5 mi) east-north-east of the Dee Estuary at Thurstaston. Prenton is at an elevation of between 17–80 m (56–262 ft) above sea level; the highest point being near the junction of Pine Walks and Burrell Road, with the Halfway House crossroads at an elevation of 50 m (160 ft) above sea level.

Prenton Brook merges with the River Fender, at Prenton, within the North Cheshire Trading Estate.

== Governance ==
Prenton is within the parliamentary constituency of Birkenhead. The current Member of Parliament is Mick Whitley, a Labour representative. He has been the MP since 2019.

At local government level, the area is incorporated into the Prenton Ward of the Metropolitan Borough of Wirral, in the metropolitan county of Merseyside. It is represented on Wirral Metropolitan Borough Council by three councillors. The most recent local elections took place on 6 May 2021.

== Community ==
Housing is mostly private, and ranges from terraced properties nearer Birkenhead, to large detached villas in the Mountwood conservation area. The major roads were mostly laid out in the early part of the 20th century. Much of the housing is from the Edwardian era and the 1930s, though there are some late Victorian buildings and some modern property. The post-war housing development, the Mount Estate, is in the south east of Prenton near to the boundary with Higher Bebington.

The main shopping area is on Woodchurch Road (A552), which includes the Sainsbury's and Aldi supermarkets. However, there are many small shops in other locations such as The Dell housing estate or in nearby Oxton.

Prenton Golf Club is to the south of the suburb.

Prenton Rugby Club is off Prenton Dell Road and runs two senior teams and has a recently refurbished clubhouse for community use.

== Education ==
Prenton includes the all-girls' secondary Prenton High School for Girls and the mixed Prenton Primary School.

== Landmarks ==
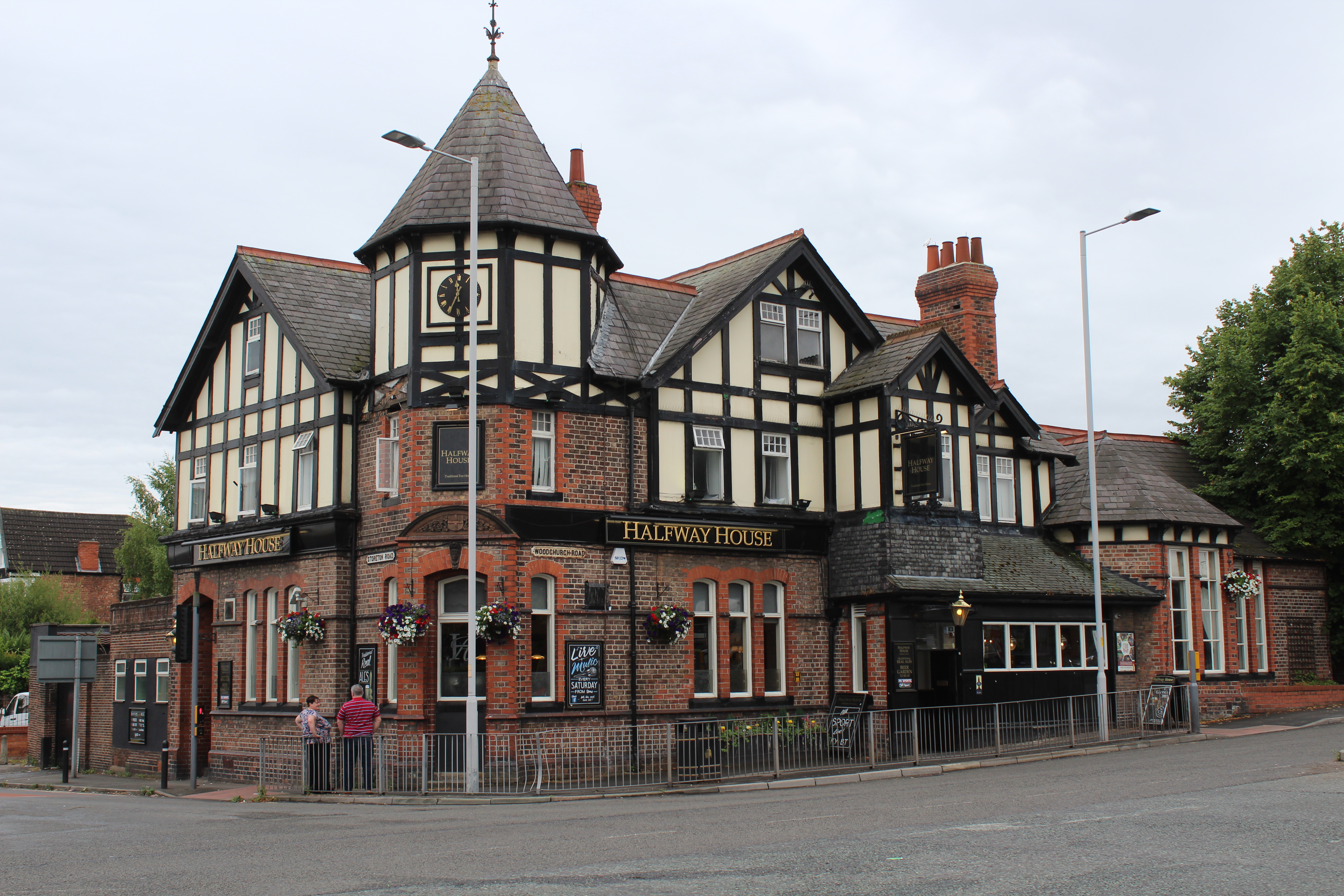
Halfway House pub

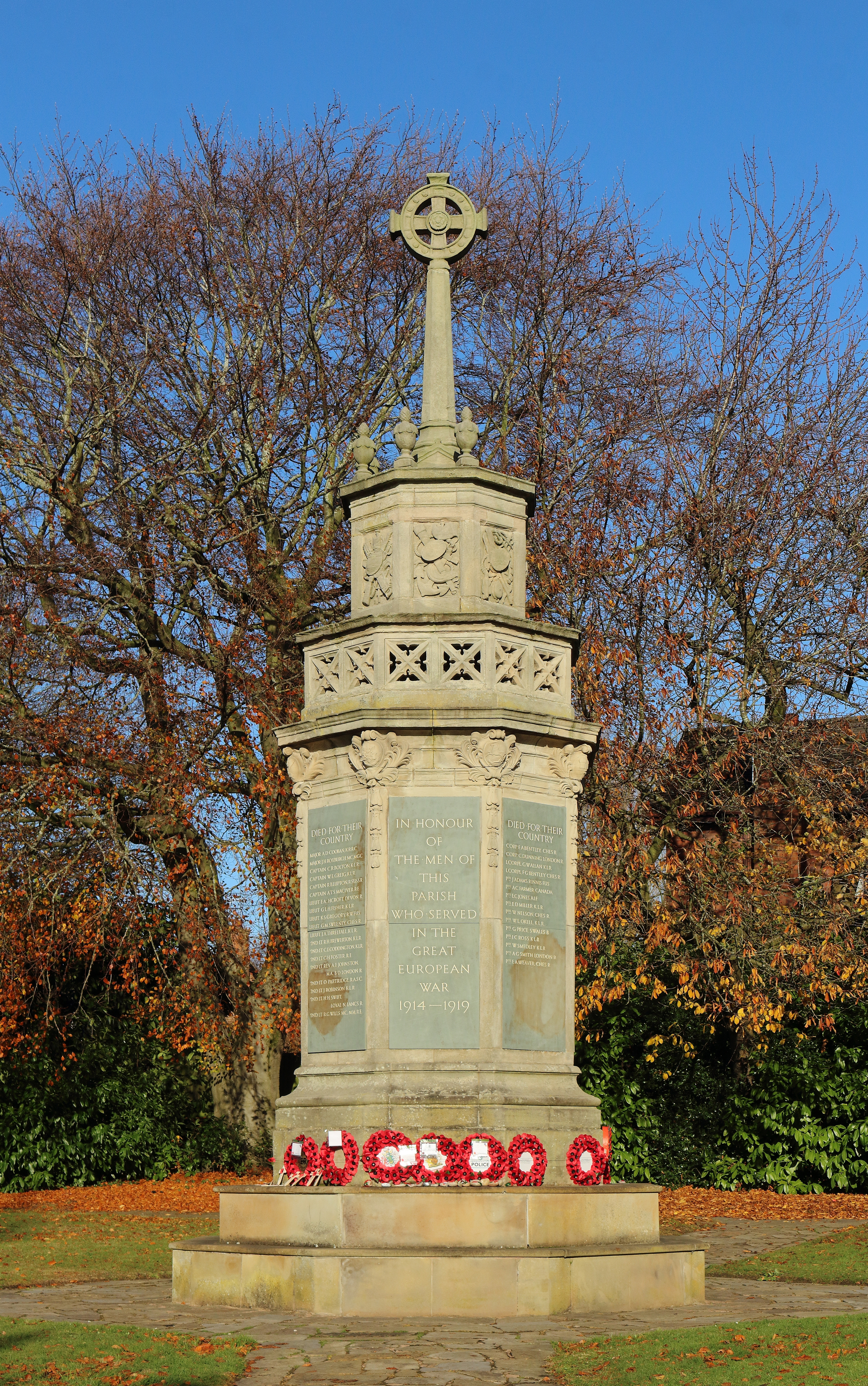
Prenton War Memorial

Prenton Hall is a former farmhouse, constructed from sandstone with slate roofing. The hall is primarily divided into two parts and both are Grade II listed buildings.

Sited on the junction of Woodchurch Road and Storeton Road is the 'Halfway House' public house. It is believed to be so named as it was approximately halfway between Woodside ferry and the village of Woodchurch. The original inn, with a licence dating back to at least 1879 was replaced at the end of the nineteenth century with the current, much larger building. Several nearby brewery-owned houses, built at the same time and in the same architectural style, were demolished when Woodchurch Road was widened. The site of the pub is now thought of as Prenton but actually was in Oxton township.

The Prenton War Memorial, near the junction where Prenton Lane and Osmaston Road converge, was constructed in 1919 and unveiled on 6 August 1920. It was rebuilt due to bomb damage sustained in the May Blitz and is now inscribed with the names of soldiers who died in both World Wars. The structure has been restored and was given Grade II listed status in 2018.

== Notable people ==
- Benjamin Dabbs, English footballer, lived in Prenton.
- Eric Nixon, English footballer, worked in Prenton.
- Louis Page, English footballer, died in Prenton.
- Julie Paulding, English cyclist, born in Prenton.
- Henry Pelling, historian, born in Prenton.
- Teddy Barton, English footballer, lived in Prenton.

== See also ==
- Listed buildings in Prenton
- St Stephen's Church, Prenton

== Bibliography ==
- Mortimer, William Williams (1847). The History of the Hundred of Wirral. London: Whittaker & Co. pp288-289.
