= Stretton, Warrington =

Village in Cheshire, England

Coordinates: 53.3381°N 2.5775°W

Stretton
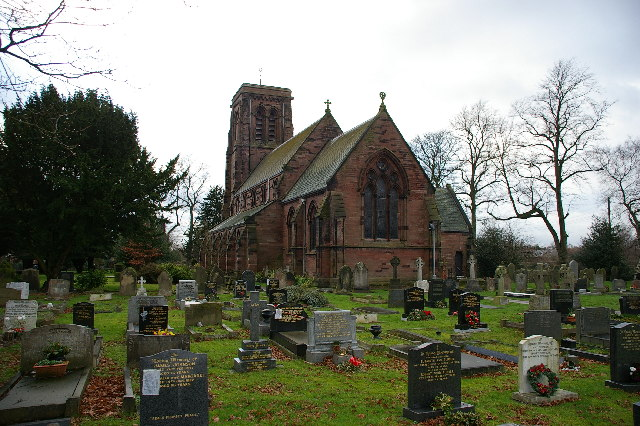
- St. Matthew's Church, Stretton

- Location within Cheshire
- Population: 1,009 (2001)
- OS grid reference: SJ615825
- Unitary authority: Warrington
- Ceremonial county: Cheshire
- Region: North West
- Country: England
- Sovereign state: United Kingdom
- Post town: Warrington
- Postcode district: WA4
- Dialling code: 01925
- Police: Cheshire
- Fire: Cheshire
- Ambulance: North West
- UK Parliament: Warrington South

Stretton is a village and civil parish in the Borough of Warrington, Cheshire, England. The parish includes the village of Lower Stretton. It is at the very southern tip of Warrington, about 4 miles (6.4 km) south of the town centre. It has a large hotel (Park Royal Hotel) and is the site of Warrington's private hospital, run by Spire Healthcare. The village is near junction 10 of the M56 motorway.

The Royal Navy Air Station HMS Blackcap existed at Stretton between June 1942 and November 1958.

Stretton means "settlement on a Roman Road" (from the Old English stræt and tun). In this case the road ran Northwich to Warrington.

== See also ==
- Listed buildings in Stretton, Warrington
- St Matthew's Church, Stretton
