= Charles Eamer Kempe =

English designer and manufacturer of stained glass

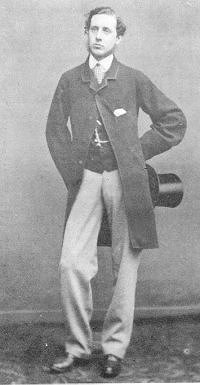
- Kempe in 1860
- Born: 29 June 1837; Ovingdean Hall, East Sussex, England
- Died: 29 April 1907 (aged 69); Nottingham Place, London, England
- Education: Pembroke College, Oxford
- Known for: Designer and manufacturer of stained glass

Charles Eamer Kempe (29 June 1837 – 29 April 1907) was a British Victorian era designer and manufacturer of stained glass. His studios produced over 4,000 windows and also designs for altars and altar frontals, furniture and furnishings, lychgates and memorials that helped to define a later nineteenth-century Anglican style. The list of English cathedrals containing examples of his work includes: Chester, Gloucester, Hereford, Lichfield, Wells, Winchester and York. Kempe's networks of patrons and influence stretched from the Royal Family and the Church of England hierarchy to the literary and artistic beau monde.

== Early life ==
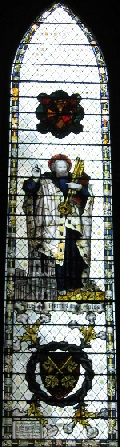
R. W. B. Hornby memorial window at York Minster

Charles Kempe was born at Ovingdean Hall, near Brighton, East Sussex in 1837. He was the youngest son of Nathaniel Kemp (1759–1843), a cousin of Thomas Read Kemp, a politician and property developer responsible for the Kemptown area of Brighton (Note: Kempe added the 'e' to his name in adult life) and the maternal grandson of Sir John Eamer, who served as Lord Mayor of London in 1801. The fact that Kempe's father was almost eighty when he was born coloured his life and attitudes.

=== Studying with William Morris ===
After attending Twyford School and Rugby, he attended Pembroke College, Oxford where he was influenced by the Anglo-Catholic Tractarian revival and considered a vocation to the priesthood. It was at Oxford that Kempe was inspired by seeing William Morris design the Debating Chamber at the Oxford Union. When he realised he was unable to manage his stammer, Kempe decided that "if I was not permitted to minister in the Sanctuary I would use my talents to adorn it", and subsequently went to study architecture with the firm of a leading ecclesiastical architect George Frederick Bodley. His first task, on leaving Oxford, was to gain some work experience. With the help of his well-connected father, Kempe was able to persuade Bodley to take him on as an assistant, and thus he found himself in Cambridge just at the time when Bodley was beginning the building and decoration of All Saints Church, Cambridge. Here he was able to learn from both Bodley and Morris and to develop his sense of how to colour a church. With Morris and Bodley, Kempe learned the aesthetic principles of medieval church art, particularly stained glass. During the 1860s Kempe collaborated with Bodley on the internal painting of two churches, All Saints, Jesus Lane in Cambridge and St John's, Tuebrook in Liverpool. Later, in 1892, Bodley and Kempe would work together once more on All Saints at Danehill, East Sussex.

== Kempe Studios ==
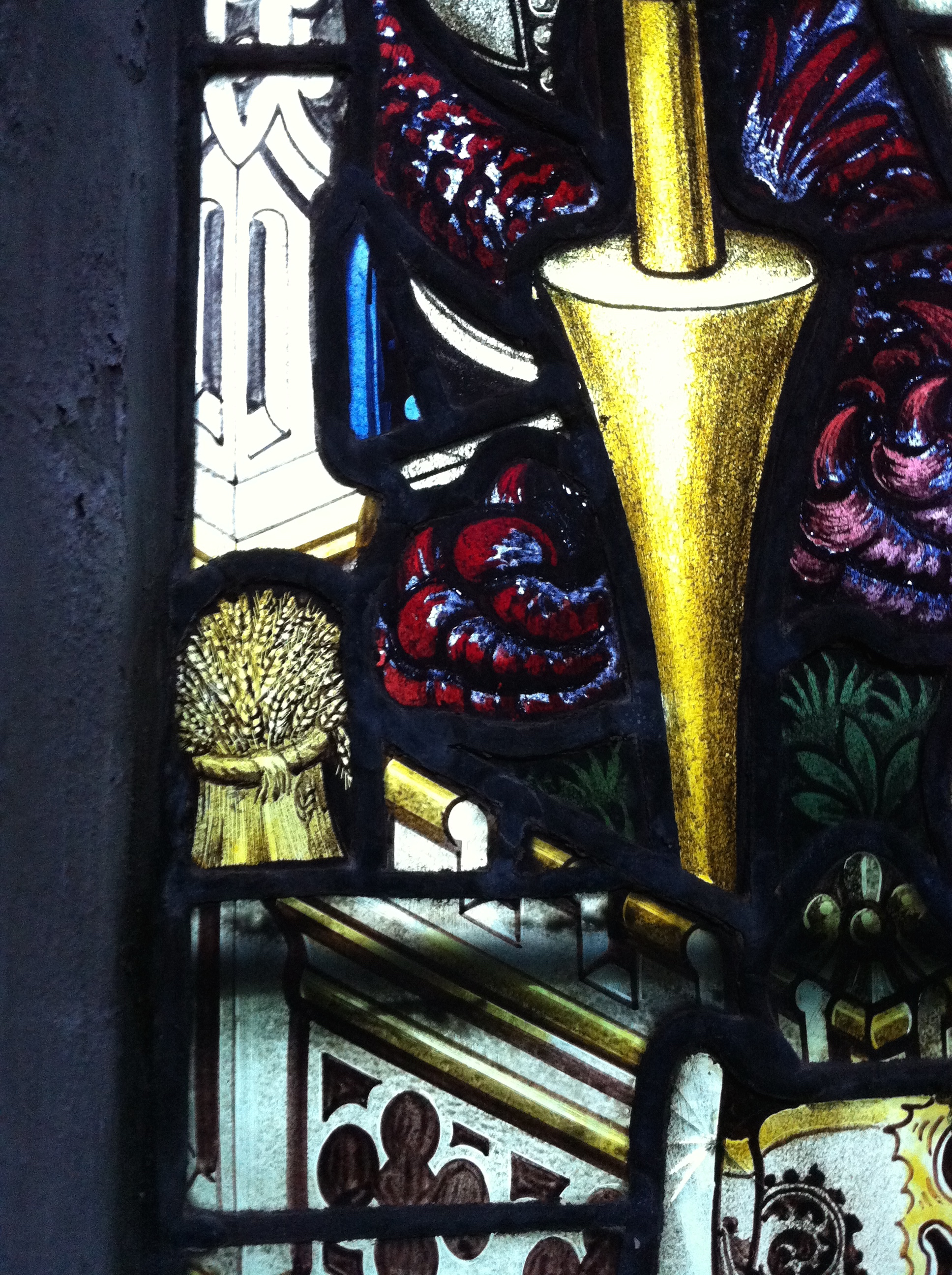
Kempe's maker's mark, the wheatsheaf, on a window in St Mary's Church, Nottingham

In 1866 he opened a studio of his own in London, supplying and creating stained glass and furnishings and vestments. The firm prospered and by 1899 he had over fifty employees. As a trademark, the firm used a golden 'garb' or heraldic wheatsheaf, taken from Kempe's own coat of arms. The mid-Victorian period were important years in the history of the design of English churches and Kempe's influence is found in numerous examples, many in his home county of Sussex which has 116 examples of his work. The works at St Mark's, Staplefield near Horsham, West Sussex dating from 1869 are regarded as especially important, representing the earliest of three known examples of Kempe's wall painting. They contain key elements of Kempe's figurative work. The angels holding the scroll are magnificently apparelled and the borders of their cloaks are embellished with pearls, each individually highlighted although they do not contain a design of peacock feathers, a well used embellishment in later works.

Kempe was a friend of George Granville Bradley, who, like him, had been educated at Rugby and had returned to teach there while Kempe was a pupil. Bradley later became Headmaster of Marlborough College (1858–1870), the school for which, in 1872, Kempe had consulted Bodley regarding renovations of its chapel (1872–73). A possible short-lived "fall out" saw Bodley partner with Thomas Garner; consequently any input from Kempe for the Marlborough commission was restricted. In 1875, William Morris's firm, Morris & Co., also provided stained-glass windows in the chapel, Morris himself having attended the school (1848-1851).

Rosalie Glynn Grylls, Lady Mander, whose home Wightwick Manor, near Wolverhampton, contains many pieces of Kempe's stained glass, wrote in 1973: "Kempe's work has a unique charm; its colours shine out from jewels that cluster on the mitres or the crowns his figures wear and from their peacocks' feathers, while angels playing their instruments are drawn with tender delicacy and scattered above the main windows informally but making a pattern of precision. Above all, the prevailing yellow wash is literally translucent, for it lets through the rays of the full or the setting sun...". Kempe's memorial windows and paintings on the reredos at Newton Park (1879), near Leeds, are fine examples of his work and his stained glass remained much in demand in England well into the 20th century. One of Kempe's last pieces of work can be seen in the Chapel at the Duke of York's Royal Military School, Dover, Kent.

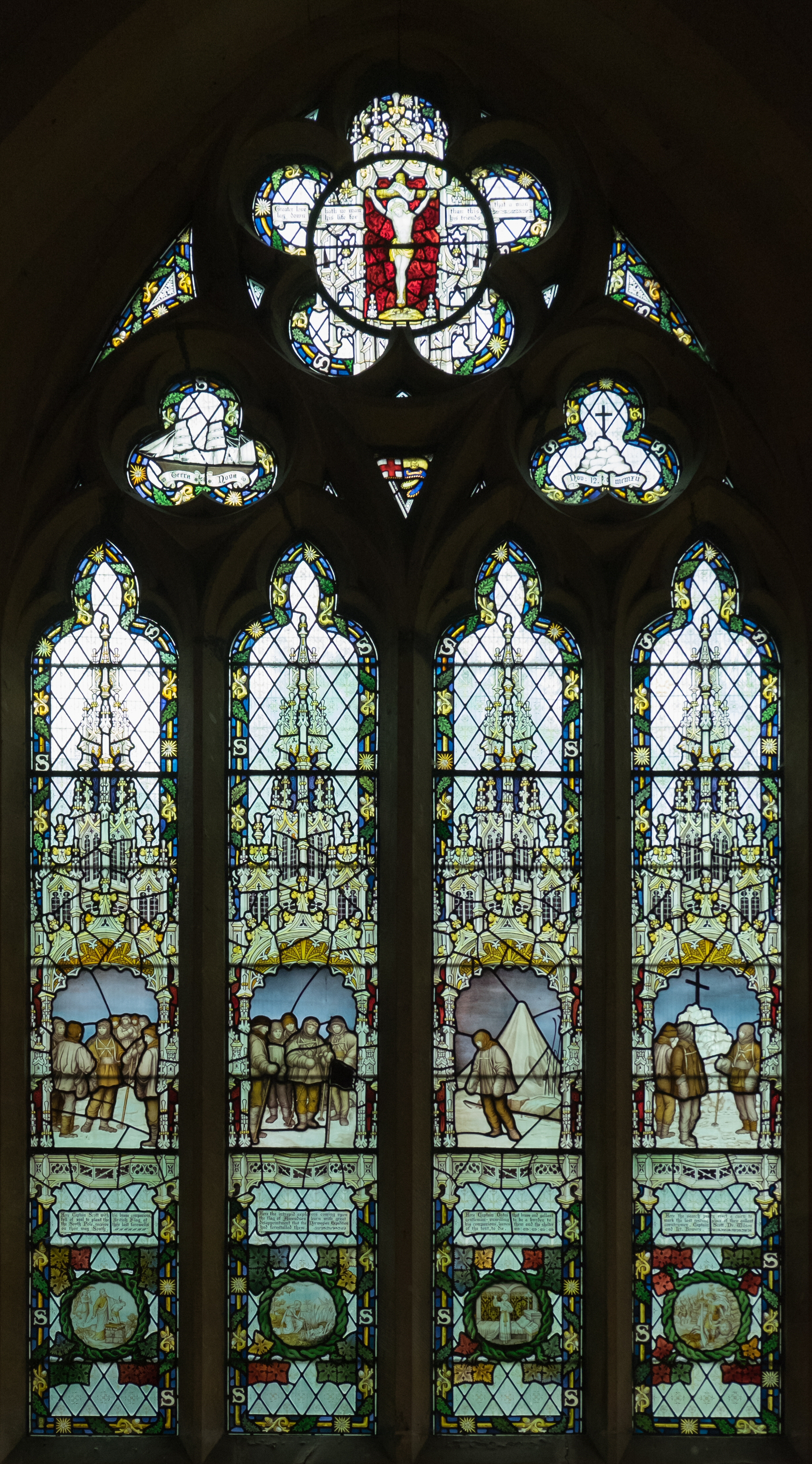
The Scott Memorial Window in St Peter's Church, Binton

Kempe's students include Charles Edward Tute (1858 – 4 November 1927), who was born in Ripon. Many of his windows, signed "CET", show influence of the master. In 1906 he migrated to Australia, where he was also known for his bookplates. He died in Brisbane.

On Kempe's death in 1907 in accordance with his will the firm was reformed as C. E. Kempe & Co. Ltd and Kempe's distant cousin, Walter Ernest Tower (1873–1955), was appointed chairman. The company thenceforth used a black tower above the golden garb as its mark. A lack of orders caused by the Great Depression ended the firm in 1934.

== Personal life ==
Kempe was a rather shy person, who never married. He continued to live in Sussex most of his life and in 1875 he bought and renovated an Elizabethan house at Lindfield, near Haywards Heath in West Sussex. Kempe would entertain his clients and professional colleagues from his home enjoying the role of a country squire.

Kempe died suddenly on 28 April 1907 aged 69, at 28 Nottingham Place, London, refusing to get medical help after catching a cold that led to congestion of the lung. He is buried in the churchyard at St Wulfran's Church, Ovingdean. Most of Kempe's records were disposed of after the firm shut in 1934.

== Books on Kempe ==
Charles Eamer Kempe remains a widely studied designer and artist. Author Adrian Barlow produced two books in 2018 and 2019 which discuss Kempe's life and the artists that surrounded him: Kempe: The Life, Art and Legacy of Charles Eamer Kempe published by The Lutterworth Press in August 2018 and Espying Heaven: The Stained Glass of Charles Eamer Kempe and his Artists in January 2019.

== Locations of Kempe's stained-glass windows ==
England
- St Andrew's Church, Biggleswade, Bedfordshire
- All Saints' Church, Leighton Buzzard, Bedfordshire
- St Mary's Church, Woburn, Bedfordshire
- St Mary's Church, Aldermaston, Berkshire
- St Bernard's Church and Parish House, Bernardsville, New Jersey, USA
- All Saints' Church, Compton Street, Compton and Shawford
- All Saints' Church, Ascot, Berkshire
- St Mark's Church, Cold Ash, Berkshire
- St Mark's Church, Reading, Berkshire
- Bristol Cathedral, Bristol
- Holy Trinity Church, Stapleton, Bristol
- St John's Church, Ashley Green, Buckinghamshire
- St Michael's Church, Chenies, Buckinghamshire
- St Mary the Virgin's Church, Edlesborough, Buckinghamshire
- St Michael and All Angels' Church, Waddesdon, Buckinghamshire
- Queens' College Chapel, Cambridge
- St Giles' Church, Cambridge, Cambridgeshire
- All Saints' Church, Cambridge, Cambridge, Cambridgeshire
- St Mary's the Lesser, Cambridge, Cambridgeshire
- St Mary the Virgin's Church, Godmanchester, Cambridgeshire
- All Saints' Church, Wittering, Cambridgeshire
- St. Mary's Church, St.Neots Cambridgeshire
- St Mary's Chapel, Arley, Cheshire
- Chester Cathedral, Chester, Cheshire
- St Thomas of Canterbury Church, Chester, Cheshire
- St Thomas the Great's Church, Ince, Cheshire
- St Oswald's Church, Malpas, Cheshire
- St Mary's Church, Nantwich, Cheshire
- St Mary and St Helen's Church, Neston, Cheshire
- St Peter's Church, Oughtrington, Cheshire
- All Saints' Church, Scholar Green, Cheshire
- St Alban's Church, Tattenhall, Cheshire
- St Chad's Church, Tushingham, Cheshire
- St John the Evangelist's Church, Weston, Cheshire
- Christ Church, Willaston, Cheshire
- St Michael's Church, Barton, Cumbria
- St Oswald's Church, Ashbourne, Derbyshire
- All Saints' Church, Bakewell, Derbyshire
- St John the Baptist Church, Buxton, Derbyshire
- St Edmund's Church, Castleton, Derbyshire
- St Werburgh's Church, Derby, Derbyshire
- St Alkmund's Church, Duffield, Derbyshire
- St Michael and All Angels' Church, Hathersage, Derbyshire
- St James the Lesser's Church, New Mills, Derbyshire
- St Andrew's Church, Ashburton, Devon
- St Andrew's Church, Coryton, Devon
- Holy Trinity Church, Ilfracombe, Devon
- St Andrew's Church, Ipplepen, Devon
- St Peter's Church, Shirwell, Devon
- St Eustachius' Church, Tavistock, Devon
- St Sabinus' Church, Woolacombe, Devon
- The Great Hall, Durham Castle, Durham, England
- St Mary and St Cuthbert, Chester-le-Street, County Durham
- St Mary the Virgin, Seaham, County Durham
- Gloucester Cathedral, Gloucester, Gloucestershire
- St George's Church, Nailsworth, Gloucestershire
- St Mary's Church, Prestbury, Gloucestershire
- St Peter's Church, Ealing, Greater London
- Holy Trinity Church, Eltham, Greater London
- St Peter and St Paul's Church, Harlington, Greater London
- St Leonard's Church, Heston, Greater London
- St Alban's Church, Holborn, Greater London
- St Mary's Church, Kennington, Kent
- St John the Divine, Kennington, Greater London
- St John the Baptist's Church, Kensington, Greater London
- St Gabriel's Church, Pimlico, Greater London
- St Alban's Church, Teddington, Greater London
- St Philip and St James Church, Whitton, Greater London
- St John the Evangelist's Church, Greater Manchester
- St Andrew's Church, Eccles, Greater Manchester
- St Michael and All Angels' Church, Howe Bridge, Greater Manchester
- St Mary the Virgin's Church, Leigh, Greater Manchester
- John Rylands Library, Manchester, Greater Manchester
- St Luke's Church, Pendleton, Greater Manchester
- Holy Trinity Church, Ashe, Hampshire
- St Mary's Church, Liss, Hampshire
- St Michael and All Angels' Church, Lyndhurst, Hampshire
- St Mary's Church, Overton, Hampshire
- Winchester Cathedral, Winchester, Hampshire
- St James the Great's Church, Colwall, Herefordshire
- St Mary the Virgin's Church, Baldock, Hertfordshire
- St Peter's Church, Berkhamsted, Hertfordshire
- All Saints' Church, Hertford, Hertfordshire
- St Katharine's Church, Ickleford, Hertfordshire
- St Peter and St Paul's Church, Little Gaddesden, Hertfordshire
- St Andrew's Church, Chale, Isle of Wight
- St Paul's Church, Newport, Isle of Wight
- St Peter's Church, Bredhurst, Kent
- St Mary and St Eanswythe's Church, Folkestone, Kent
- St John the Evangelist's Church, Groombridge, Kent
- St Luke's Church, Matfield, Kent
- St Margaret's Church, Hothfield, Kent
- St Mary the Virgin's Church, Riverhead, Kent
- St Bartholomew's Hospital, Rochester, Kent
- St Mary's Church, Riverhead, Kent
- St John the Baptist's Church, Atherton, Lancashire
- St Peter and St Paul's Church, Bolton-by-Bowland, Lancashire
- St Cuthbert's Church, Lytham, Lancashire
- St Simon and St Jude Church, Earl Shilton, Leicestershire
- All Saints' Church, Gilmorton, Leicestershire
- St Mark's Church, Leicester, Leicestershire
- All Saints' Church, Thorpe Acre, Leicestershire
- St Oswald's Church, Crowle, Lincolnshire
- St Peter's Church, Great Limber, Lincolnshire
- All Saints' Church, Saxby All Saints, Lincolnshire
- Church of the Resurrection and All Saints, Caldy, Merseyside
- All Saints' Church, Childwall, Merseyside
- St John the Divine's Church, Frankby, Merseyside
- Christ Church, Higher Bebington, Merseyside
- Liverpool Cathedral, Liverpool, Merseyside
- St John the Baptist's Church, Liverpool, Merseyside
- St Saviour's Church, Oxton, Merseyside
- St Agnes and St Pancras' Church, Toxteth Park, Merseyside
- St Andrew's Church, West Kirby, Merseyside
- St Bridget's Church, Merseyside
- St Peter's Church, Woolton, Merseyside
- St Mary the Virgin's Church, Bessingham, Norfolk
- Church of St Andrew and St Peter, Blofield, Norfolk
- St Lawrence's Church, Brundall, Norfolk
- St Nicholas' Church, Dersingham, Norfolk
- St Mary's Church, Ellingham, Norfolk
- Holy Trinity Church, Great Hockham, Norfolk
- St Michael's Church, Aynho, Northamptonshire
- St James' Church, Newbottle, Northamptonshire
- St Anne's Chapel, Shutlanger, Northamptonshire
- St Mary's Church, Belford, Northumberland
- St Jude's Church, Knarsdale, Northumberland
- St Matthew's Church, Newcastle upon Tyne, Northumberland
- All Saints' Church, Babworth, Nottinghamshire
- St Peter's Church, Clayworth, Nottinghamshire
- St Mary the Virgin's Church, Clumber Park, Nottinghamshire
- St Mary's Church, East Leake, Nottinghamshire
- St Mary Magdalene's Church, Hucknall, Nottinghamshire
- St Mark's Church, Mansfield, Nottinghamshire
- St Laurence's Church, Norwell, Nottinghamshire
- High Pavement Chapel, Nottingham, Nottinghamshire
- St Mary's Church, Nottingham, Nottinghamshire
- St Saviour's Church, Retford, Nottinghamshire
- St Peter and St Paul's Church, Shelford Nottinghamshire
- St Swithun's Church, Woodborough, Nottinghamshire
- The Grundy Library, Abingdon School, Abingdon-on-Thames, Oxfordshire
- St Mary's Church, Bloxham, Oxfordshire
- St Mary's Church, Broughton, Oxfordshire
- St John the Baptist's Church, Burford, Oxfordshire
- St Mary's Church, Crowell, Oxfordshire
- All Saints' Church, Cuddesdon, Oxfordshire
- St Peter and St Paul's Church, Deddington, Oxfordshire
- Christ Church Cathedral, Oxford, Oxfordshire
- St Edward's School, Oxford, Oxfordshire
- Jesus College, Oxford, Oxfordshire
- St John's Chapel, Oxford, Oxfordshire
- St John the Evangelist Church, Oxford, Oxfordshire
- University Church of St Mary the Virgin, Oxford, Oxfordshire
- St Paul's Church, Oxford, Oxfordshire
- Pembroke College Chapel, Oxford, Oxfordshire
- Church of St Philip and St James, Oxford, Oxfordshire
- St Thomas the Martyr's Church, Oxford, Oxfordshire
- All Saints' Church, Broseley, Shropshire
- St Mary's Church, Hopesay, Shropshire
- St Martin's Church, Great Ness, Shropshire
- St Mary's Church, Market Drayton, Shropshire
- St Peter's Church, Melverley, Shropshire
- St Mary's Church, Shrewsbury, Shropshire
- St Bartholomew's Church, Tong, Shropshire
- All Saints' Church, Ashcott, Somerset
- St Michael's Church, Blackford, Somerset
- St Mary's Church, Buckland St Mary, Somerset
- Holy Trinity Church, Burrington, Somerset
- St Mary's Church, Compton Pauncefoot, Somerset
- St John the Baptist's Church, Frome, Somerset
- St John the Baptist's Church, Horsington, Somerset
- St John the Baptist's Church, Midsomer Norton, Somerset
- St Mary the Virgin's Church, Whitelackington, Somerset
- All Saints' Church, Wraxall, Somerset
- All Saints Church, Ecclesall, Sheffield, South Yorkshire
- All Saints Church, Alrewas, Staffordshire
- St Peter's Church, Broughton, Staffordshire
- All Saints' Church, Chebsey, Staffordshire
- St Editha's Church, Church Eaton, Staffordshire
- Lichfield Cathedral, Lichfield, Staffordshire
- Christ Church, Lichfield, Staffordshire
- St Mary's Church, Mucklestone, Staffordshire
- St Mary's Church, Rolleston on Dove, Staffordshire
- St Chad's Church, Slindon, Staffordshire
- St Bartholomew's Church, Wednesbury, Staffordshire
- St Mary's Church, Wheaton Aston, Staffordshire
- Wightwick Manor, Wolverhampton, Staffordshire
- St Benedict Biscop Church, Wombourne, Staffordshire
- St Catherine's School, Bramley, Surrey
- St John the Evangelist's Church, North Holmwood, Surrey
- Christ Church, Ottershaw, Surrey
- St Augustine's Church, Brighton, East Sussex
- St Michael's Church, Brighton, East Sussex
- St Nicholas Church, Brighton, East Sussex
- St Peter's Church, Brighton, East Sussex
- St Mary's Church, Hampden Park, Eastbourne, East Sussex
- St Philip's Church, Hove, East Sussex
- St Wulfran's Church, Ovingdean, East Sussex
- St Luke's Church, Queen's Park, Brighton, East Sussex
- Church of St Thomas of Canterbury and English Martyrs, St Leonards-on-Sea, East Sussex
- St John the Baptist's Church, Sedlescombe, East Sussex
- St Peter's Church, Ardingly, West Sussex
- St John the Baptist's Church, Clayton, West Sussex
- St Peter's Church, Cowfold, West Sussex
- Holy Trinity Church, Cuckfield, West Sussex
- St Mary's Church, Fittleworth, West Sussex
- St Benedict's Chapel, Haywards Heath, West Sussex
- St Peter's Church, Henfield, West Sussex
- All Saints Church, Highbrook, West Sussex
- St Giles' Church, Horsted Keynes, West Sussex
- St John the Baptist's Church, Kirdford, West Sussex
- St Michael and All Angels Church, Partridge Green, West Sussex
- St Michael and All Angels Church, Southwick, West Sussex
- St Mary Magdalene's Church, Tortington, West Sussex
- St Leonard's Church, Turners Hill, West Sussex
- St Margaret's Church, West Hoathly, West Sussex
- All Hallows' Church, Woolbeding, West Sussex
- St Andrew's Church, Worthing, West Sussex
- St Peter's Church, Binton, Warwickshire
- St George's Church, Edgbaston, Warwickshire
- St Mary Magdalene's Church, Lillington, Warwickshire
- St Alphege Church, Solihull, Warwickshire
- St James the Great's Church, Dauntsey, Wiltshire
- St James' Church, Devizes, Wiltshire
- St Peter's Church, Pitton, Wiltshire
- St Mary & St Lawrence's Church, Stratford Tony, Wiltshire
- St Nicholas' Church, Bawtry, South Yorkshire
- St Michael and All Angels' Church, Beckwithshaw, North Yorkshire
- St Anne's Church, Catterick, North Yorkshire
- St Leonard's Church, Thornton-le-Street, North Yorkshire
- All Saints' Church, Pavement, York, North Yorkshire
- Holy Trinity Church, Micklegate, York, North Yorkshire
- St Sampson's Social Centre, York, North Yorkshire
- St James' Church, Lissett, East Riding of Yorkshire
- St Leonard's Church, Dinnington, South Yorkshire
- St Lawrence's Church, Hatfield, South Yorkshire
- St James' Church, High Melton, South Yorkshire
- Holy Trinity Church, Wentworth, South Yorkshire
- All Saints' Church, Harewood, West Yorkshire
- All Souls' Church, Blackman Lane, Leeds, West Yorkshire
- St Paul's Church, Mirfield, West Yorkshire
- St Giles' Church, Pontefract, West Yorkshire
- Wakefield Cathedral, Wakefield, West Yorkshire
- St Anne's Church, Wrenthorpe, West Yorkshire
- St Margaret of Antioch, Leiston, Suffolk

Isles of Scilly

- St Mary's Church, St Mary's
- St Nicholas's Church, Tresco

Scotland

- St Ninian's Chapel, Braemar, Aberdeenshire
- St John's Church, Moffat, Dumfriesshire
- Dunblane Cathedral, Dunblane, Perthshire
- Govan Old Parish Church, Govan, Glasgow

Wales

- St John the Baptist's Church, Old Colwyn, Clwyd
- * St Giles' Church, Wrexham, Clwyd
- St Cadoc's Church, Llangattock Vibon Avel, Monmouthshire
- St Mary's Priory Church, Monmouth, Monmouthshire
- Church of St Michael and All Angels, Llanvihangel-Ystern-Llewern, Monmouthshire
- St Michael and All Angels Church, Kerry, Powys

Australia

- Christ Church Cathedral, Newcastle, New South Wales

Canada

- Cathedral of St John the Baptist, St John's, Newfoundland and Labrador

South Africa

- St Mark's Cathedral, George, Western Cape

Turkey

- St John the Evangelist's Anglican Church, İzmir, İzmir Province

United States

- Christ Church, New Haven, Connecticut
- Emmanuel Episcopal Church, Boston, Massachusetts
- St Barnabas' Church, Omaha, Nebraska
- Church of the Incarnation, Manhattan, New York
- St Mark's Church, Philadelphia, Pennsylvania
- St Timothy's Episcopal Church, Roxborough, Pennsylvania
- St Luke’s Episcopal Church, East Hampton, New York
- Trinity Episcopal Church, Baraboo, Wisconsin

Mexico

- Christ Church, Mexico City

== Gallery ==
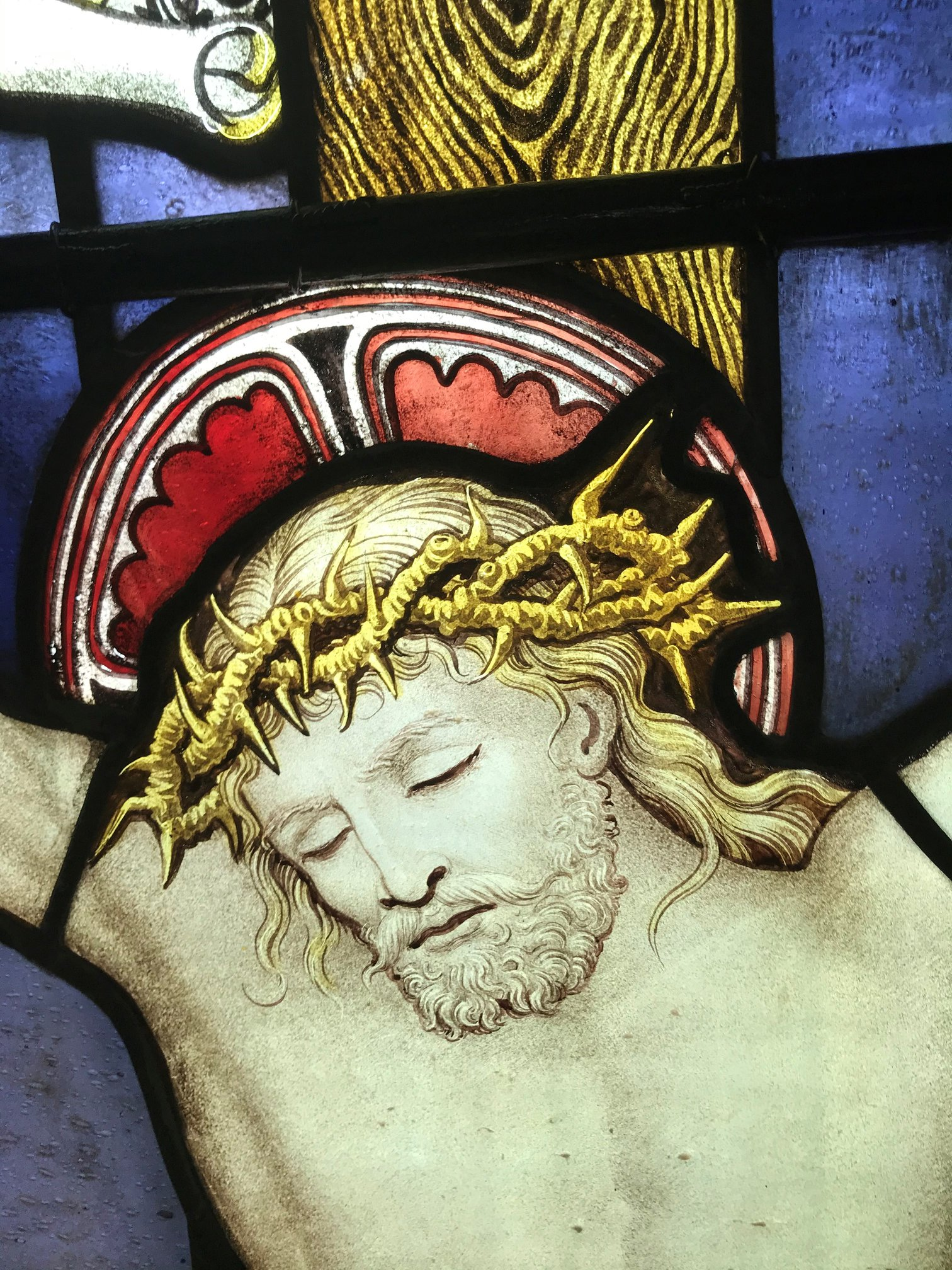
Central chapel window at the Duke of York's Royal Military School

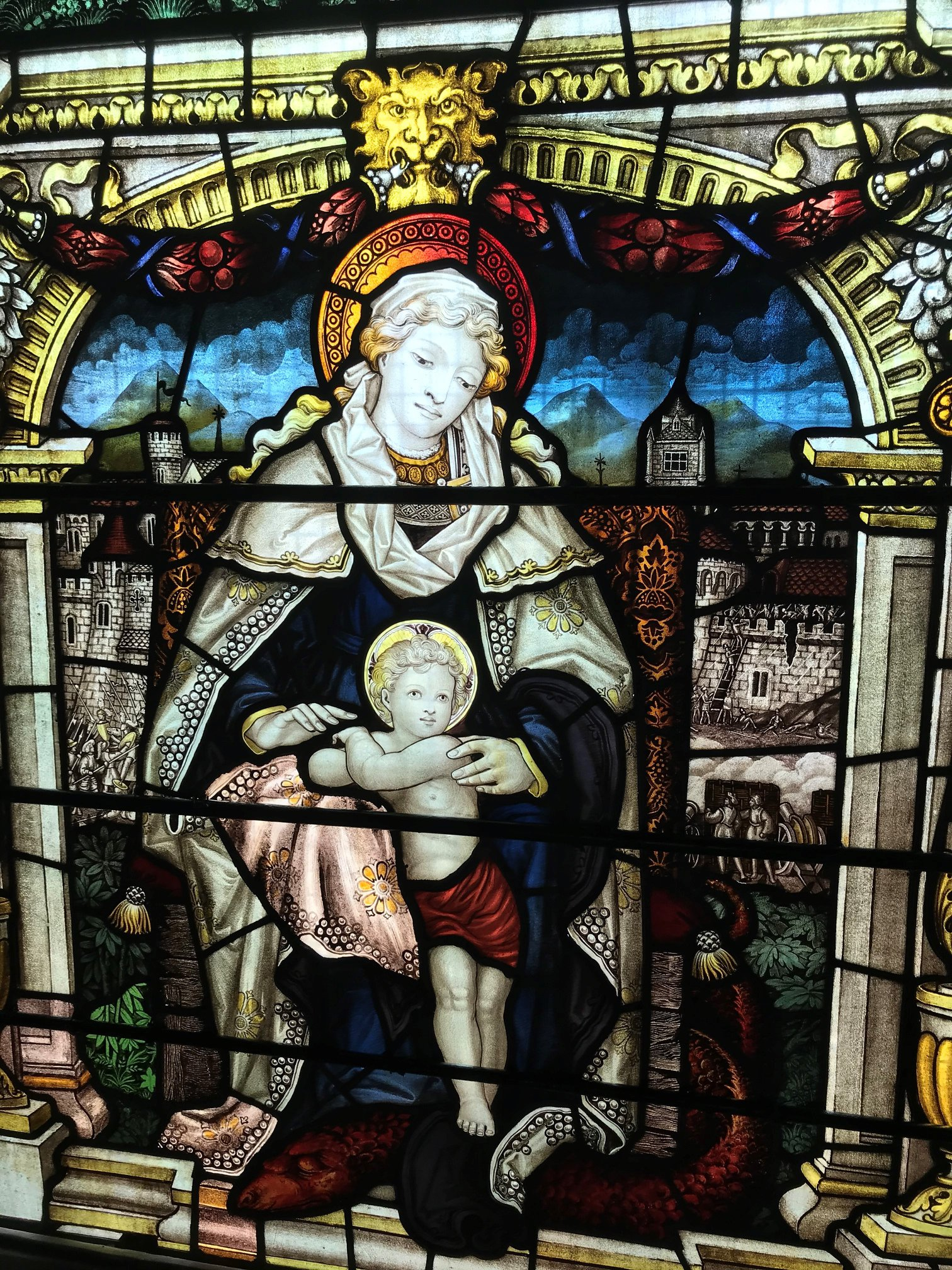
Chapel window at the Duke of York's Royal Military School

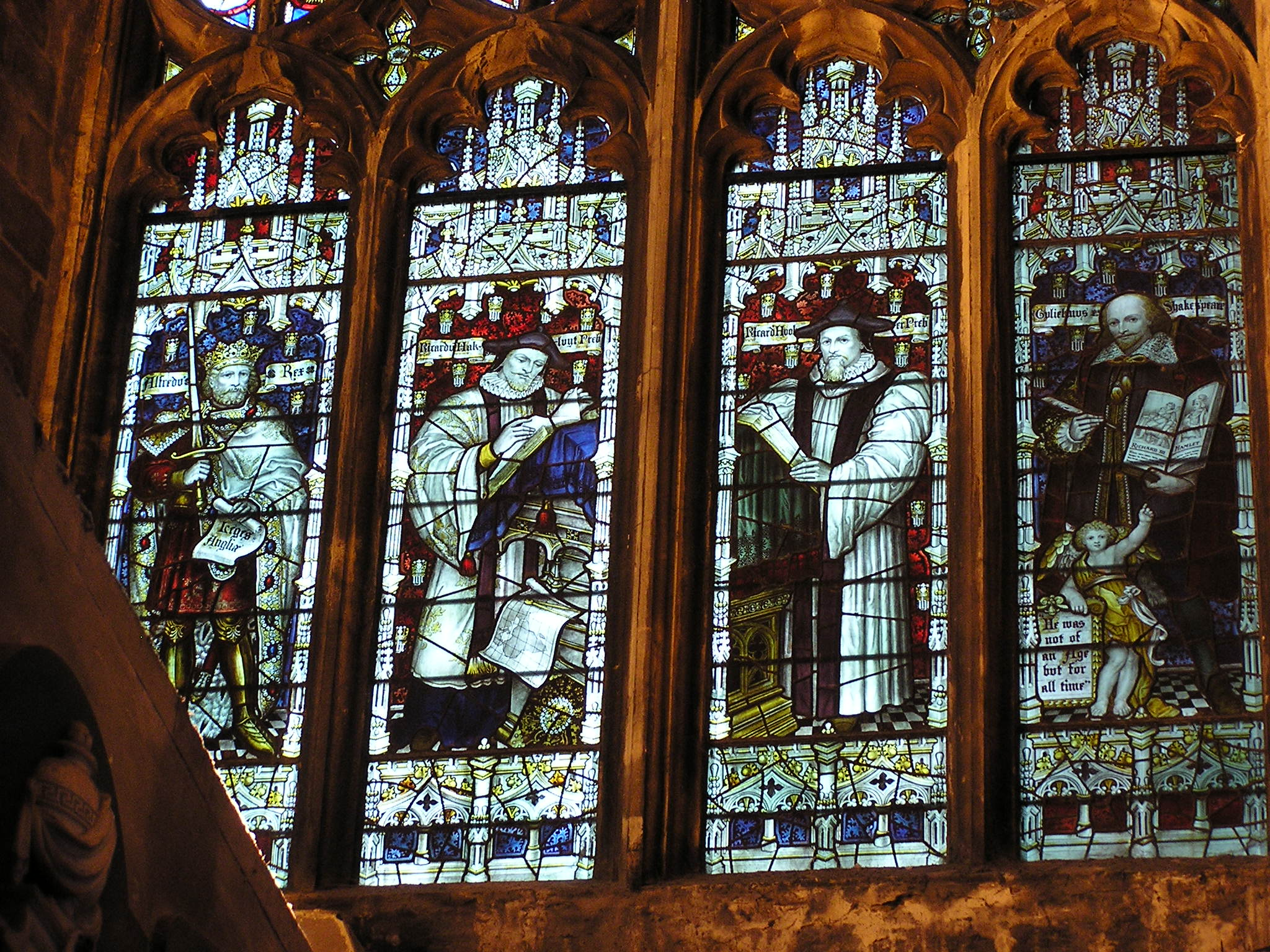
Window in Bristol Cathedral: King Alfred, Richard Hakluyt, Richard Hooker & William Shakespeare

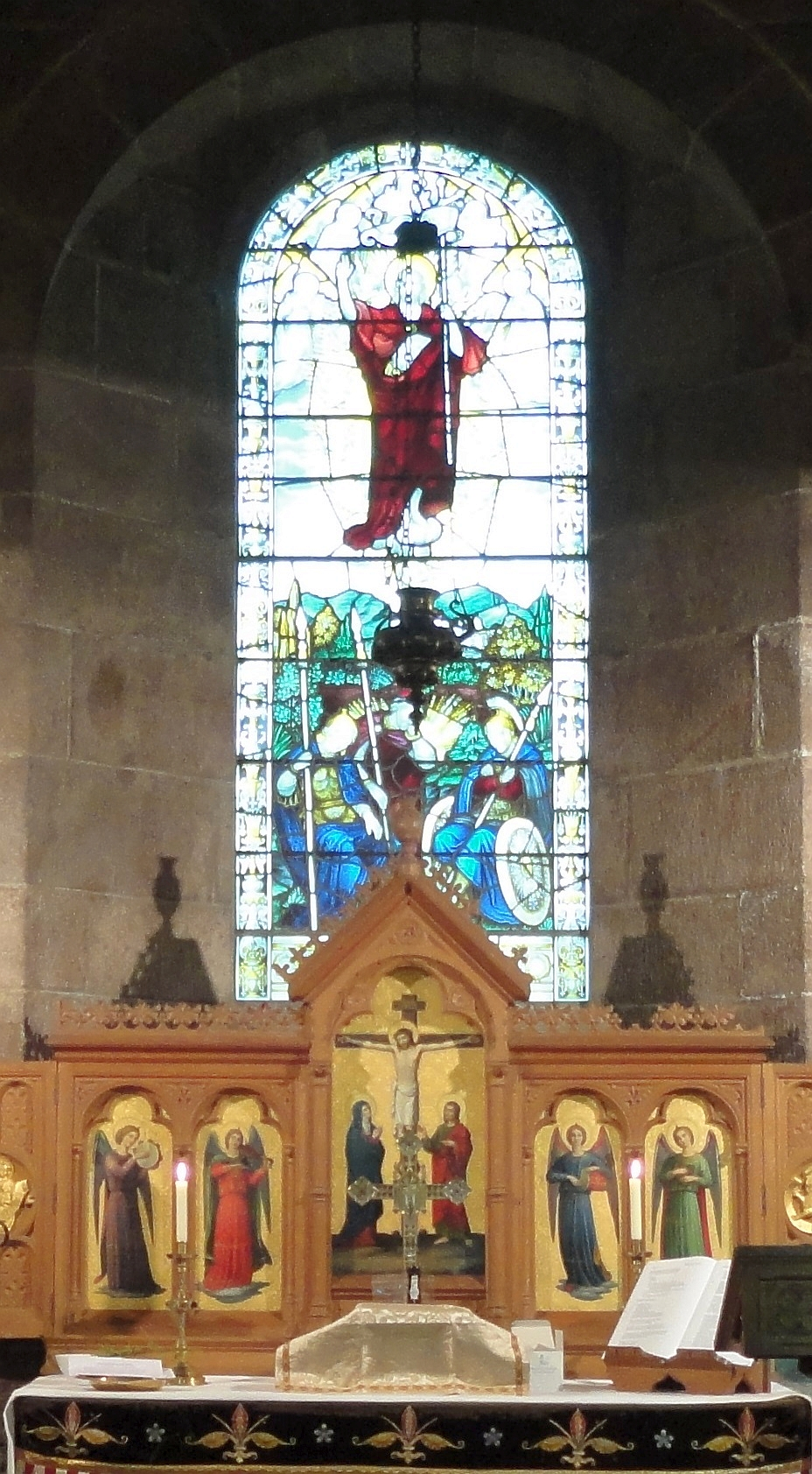
Window in St Ninian's Chapel, Braemar

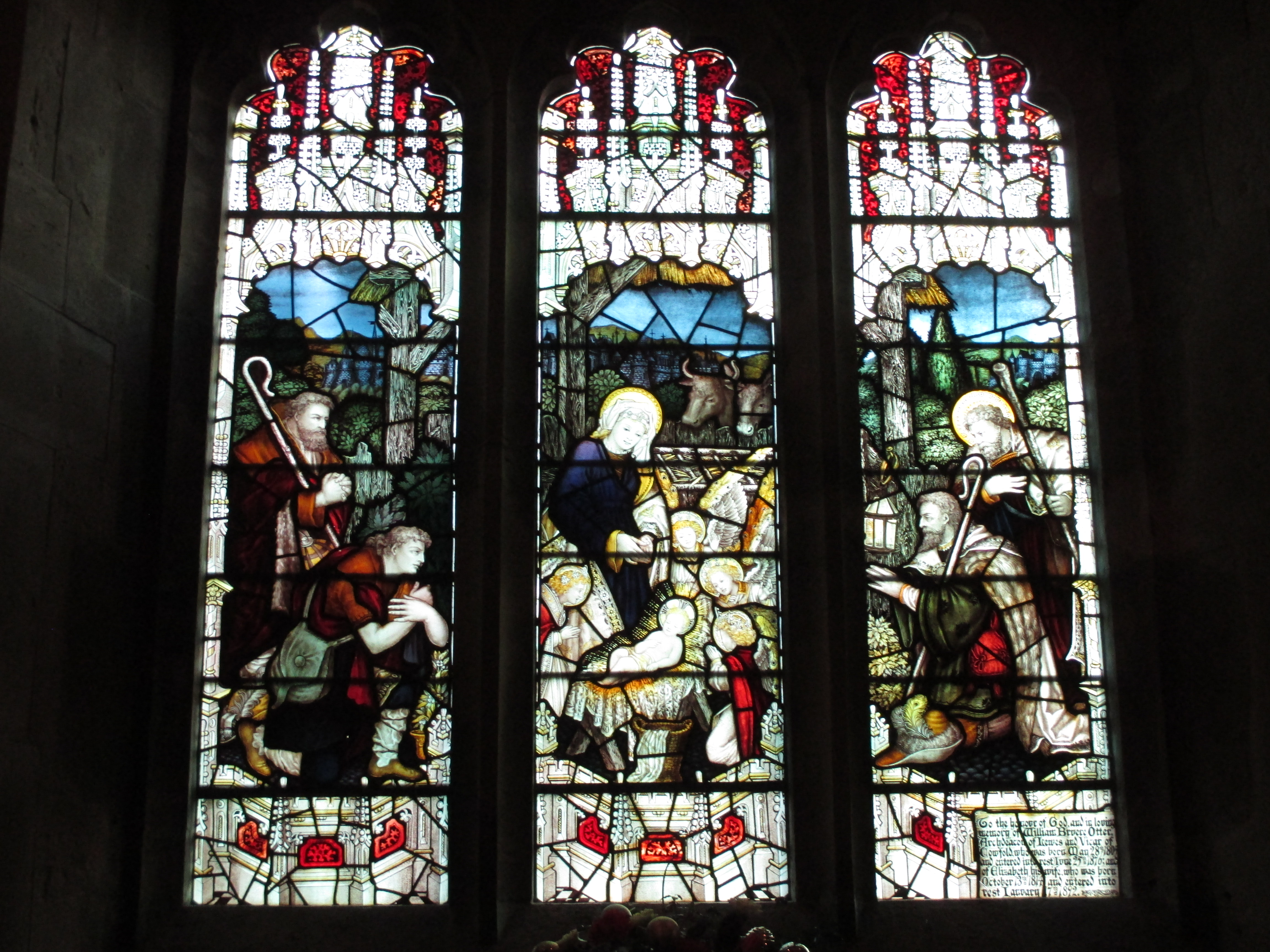
St Peter's Church, Cowfold, West Sussex

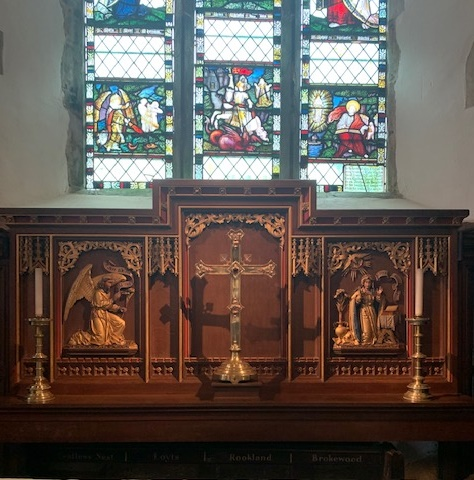
Reredos at St.George's, West Grinstead, West Sussex (1912)

== See also ==
- British and Irish stained glass (1811–1918)
- Victorian Era
- Gothic Revival
