= List of parks and commons in Wirral Borough =

This is a list of parks and commons in the Metropolitan Borough of Wirral.

- Arrowe Country Park
- Ashton Park
- Barnston Dale
- Bidston Hill
- Bidston Moss
- Birkenhead Park
- Caldy Hill
- Central Park
- Coronation Gardens
- Dibbinsdale
- Eastham Country Park
- Flaybrick Cemetery
- Heswall Dales
- Hilbre Island
- Mayer Park
- Meols Park
- Mersey Park
- North Wirral Coastal Park
- River Park
- Royden Park
- Thurstaston Common
- Upton Meadow
- Upton Park
- Vale Park
- Victoria Park
- Walker Park
- Warwick Park
- Wirral Country Park
