= Moreton, Merseyside =

Town in Merseyside, England

Coordinates: 53.401°N 3.111°W

Moreton
- Town
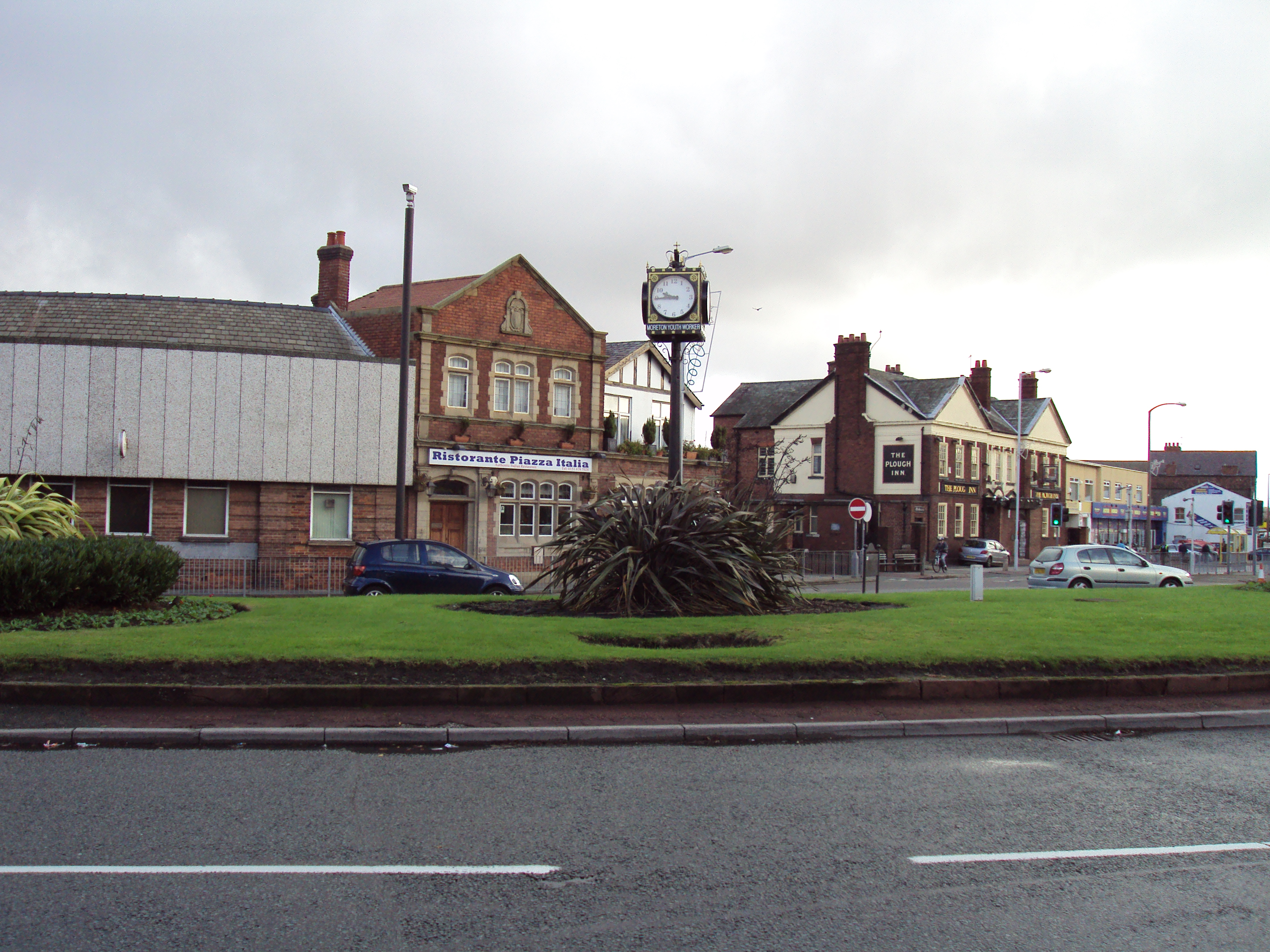
- The clock on Moreton Cross roundabout, at the junction of the A551 and A553 roads

- Location within Merseyside
- Population: 17,670 (2001 Census)
- OS grid reference: SJ261899
  - London: 181 mi (291 km) SE
- Metropolitan borough: Wirral
- Metropolitan county: Merseyside
- Region: North West
- Country: England
- Sovereign state: United Kingdom
- Post town: WIRRAL
- Postcode district: CH46
- Dialling code: 0151
- ISO 3166 code: GB-WRL
- Police: Merseyside
- Fire: Merseyside
- Ambulance: North West
- UK Parliament: Wallasey

Moreton is a town in the Metropolitan Borough of Wirral in Merseyside, England. Located on the north coast of the Wirral Peninsula, it is approximately 3 mi (4.8 km) to the west of Wallasey. Historically part of Cheshire and now within the Metropolitan Borough of Wirral, the town was divided in 2004 between the local government wards of Leasowe & Moreton East and Moreton West & Saughall Massie. Moreton is also part of the parliamentary constituency of Wallasey. In the 2001 census, it had a population of 17,670.

== Toponymy ==
The name Moreton was first recorded in 1278, as Meretun; it derives from Anglo-Saxon words meaning a settlement (tun) beside a lake (mere).

== History ==
Prior to the Norman conquest, the Lingham area of Moreton was a possible location for Dingesmere, mentioned with regard to the Battle of Brunanburh, in Egil's Saga.

It was in the Wirral Hundred, the ancient administrative area for the Wirral Peninsula. In the twelfth century, it formed part of the estates of Hamo de Mascy.

The village joined with neighbouring Lingham to form the parish of Moreton-cum-Lingham in the late nineteenth century. Moreton was formerly a township and chapelry in the parish of Bidston; in 1866, Moreton became a separate civil parish.

On 1 April 1928, the parish was abolished and merged with Wallasey, becoming part of the County Borough of Wallasey.

== Geography ==
The town is located between Great Meols to the west, and Bidston and Upton to the south and east. Before the sea embankment was constructed, the area included 3000 acres of tidal lagoon, at between one and two metres below sea level, with most of the remainder little more than one metre above.

The coast at Moreton is part of a stretch of sand that runs from Meols to Leasowe; it is known as Mockbeggar Wharf, named after Mockbeggar Hall, otherwise known as Leasowe Castle. Mockbeggar Hall is also the name of Moreton's former Wetherspoons pub; the name Mockbeggar being an old sailors' term for a lone house. The North Wirral Coastal Park also runs for four miles along this coast, including public open space, common land, natural foreshore and sand dunes. The park provides a wide variety of recreational activities; some of the more popular being sailing, sea angling, swimming, cycling, picnicking, walking, jogging, ball games, bird watching and horse riding.

The low-lying land behind the coast is protected by a large concrete embankment. Some of the coastal land is in the Moreton Conservation Area and provides important natural habitat. The embankment gives a good view at low tide to see a variety of wading birds. There are also good views of Bidston Hill and Caldy Hill. Further afield, Winter Hill is often visible beyond Liverpool and, in the opposite direction, much of North Wales can be seen from the embankment, including Moel Famau, Snowdonia, the Great Orme and Anglesey. On clear days, Black Combe in Cumbria can also be seen.

Arrowe Brook merges with the Birket at Moreton. The Birket then continues towards West Float at the site of the former Wallasey Pool.

== Demography ==
The population was 210 in 1801, 350 in 1851, 597 in 1901 and 4029 in 1921.

At the 2001 census, the population was 12,532 (5,980 males, 6,552 females), although sharing split wards of the Metropolitan Borough of Wirral, encompassing a larger area, it was recorded as 13,735 (6,442 males, 7,293 females) for Leasowe and Moreton East, and 14,423 (6,879 males, 7,544 females) for Moreton West and Saughall Massie.

At the 2011 Census, the population is solely recorded as sharing split wards of the Metropolitan Borough of Wirral, being recorded as 14,640 (7,005 males, 7,635 females) for Leasowe and Moreton East, and 13,988 (6,732 males, 7,256 females) for Moreton West and Saughall Massie.

== Governance ==
Moreton is part of the Metropolitan Borough of Wirral, in the metropolitan county of Merseyside. Moreton is also part of the parliamentary constituency of Wallasey. The current Member of Parliament is Angela Eagle, a Labour representative who has held the seat since 1992. The previous incumbent of the post was Lynda Chalker of the Conservative Party.

The area is also split amongst two of the local government wards of the Metropolitan Borough of Wirral. These being Leasowe & Moreton East and Moreton West & Saughall Massie. Moreton is represented on Wirral Metropolitan Borough Council by six councillors: three from the Labour Party (Moreton East) and three from the Conservative Party (Moreton West).

== Economy ==
=== Food manufacturing ===
Moreton is also known for being the home of the Burton's factory, which is now owned by Duke Street Capital. This factory was also the producer of Cadbury's biscuits. Manor Bakeries is located in the town at Reeds Lane, near to Leasowe railway station; it was formerly Cadbury's cakes department, which now owned by Premier Foods Group,

Moreton is also home to Typhoo Tea, with the factory located next to the Burton's factory.

=== Pharmaceuticals ===
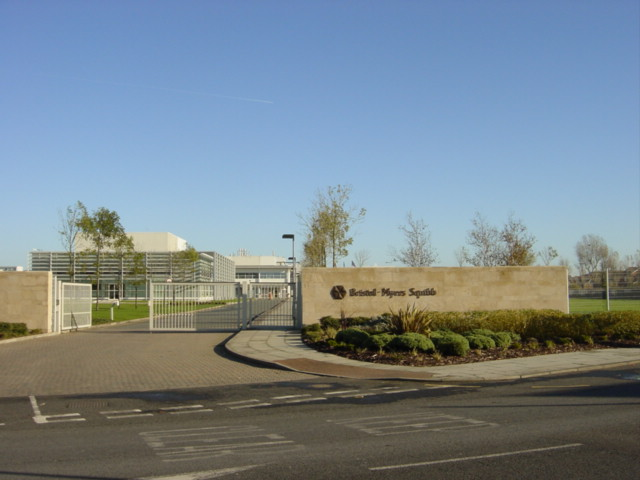
The Bristol-Myers-Squibb Pharmaceutical Research Institute

Until the 1990s, Bristol-Myers Squibb was also a major employer to the local workforce, with a large factory located on the opposite side of Reeds Lane to Burton's, next to Leasowe station. However, in the mid-90s, manufacturing was moved out of Moreton which led to the closure of the factory.

At the same time, there was heavy investment into modern drug development and research labs on the site, which are still operated by Bristol-Myers Squibb. In 2009, the company provided further investment into the site.

=== Tarran Way Industrial Estate ===
The estate is mainly home to various car repair facilities and other light industry businesses.

Dantec is the UK's biggest manufacturer of composite hoses, which are used in the transfer of petrochemicals. The company was established in 1969 and the business is situated on Tarran Way.

=== Former brickworks ===
Della Robbia Pottery used local red clay from Moreton. Barker and Briscoe Brickworks was situated on Carr Lane, 1 mile (1.6 km) west of the centre of the village.

== Transport ==
=== Railway ===
Two stations serve the town: these are Moreton and Leasowe; both are on the West Kirby branch of the Wirral Line. Merseyrail operates frequent electric services between West Kirby and Liverpool Central, via Birkenhead Park. Both Leasowe and Moreton offer park and ride facilities.

A third station, Town Meadow, has been proposed to serve the Town Meadow / Millhouse areas, but this is currently seen as a long term project by the Liverpool City Region Combined Authority.

=== Roads ===
Moreton is situated at the roundabout junction of roads from Bidston (the A553), Leasowe (the A551), Meols (the A553) and Upton (the A551). The A5027 Upton bypass continues into Junction 2a of the M53 motorway, known as Moreton Spur, to the south of Moreton.

=== Water ===
Moreton witnessed the world's first commercial passenger and mail hovercraft service. The experimental Rhyl to Wallasey Hovercoach service was operated by British United Airways and ran between Leasowe embankment and Rhyl in North Wales. The service commenced on 20 July 1962 and made its last trip on 14 September 1962.

== Community ==
=== Schools ===
Moreton Christ Church CofE Primary School, located on Upton Road, is a Church of England school that educates around 400 pupils in ages 4–11. It was opened, as the 'Moreton Church of England School' in 1861, in the centre of Moreton. It was established in its current location in 1974.

Other schools include Sacred Heart Primary School, Lingham Primary School, Eastway Primary School, Sandbrook Primary School, Foxfield School (formerly St Thomas Becket Catholic School demolished around 2012/13), Orrets Meadow Special School and Clare Mount Specialist Sports College (formerly Moreton Middle School).

=== Churches ===
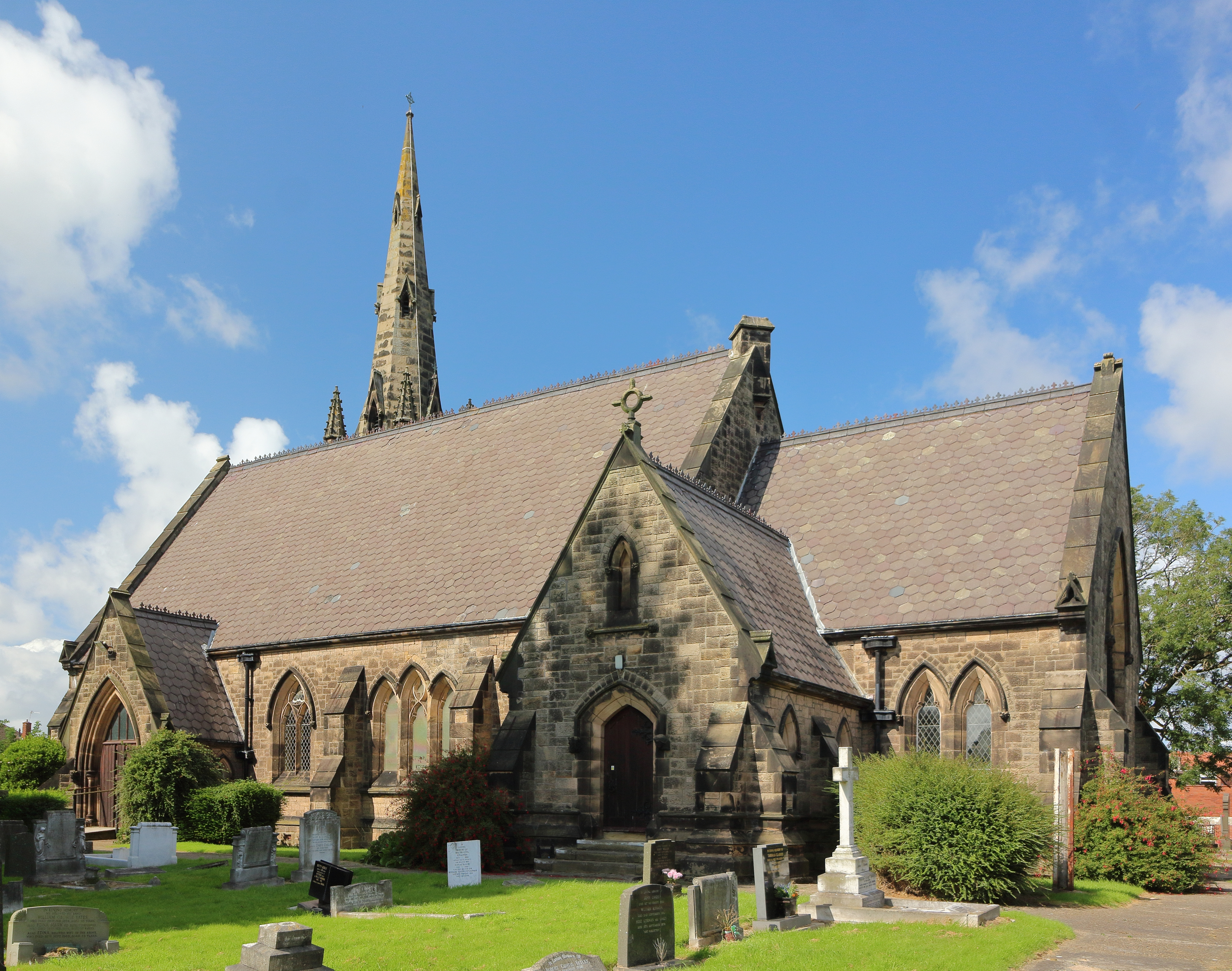
Christ Church, situated on Upton Road

Moreton has various religious establishments, though all of Christian denominations. The most substantial building is the Church of England's Christ Church on Upton Road, which was built in 1863; it replaced an earlier building known as a chapel-of-ease which had been pulled down by 1690 and was then within the parish of Bidston. The church, vicarage and school were built at a cost of £8,000, paid for by a donation from William Inman, with the church being designed by Cunningham and Audsley. The church has a spire and used to have a rectory which was demolished in 1922. Christ Church became a Grade II listed building in 1987.

The other significant churches include Sacred Heart Catholic Church and the Moreton Methodist Church. The smaller establishments include the Moreton Presbyterian Church, the Moreton Christian Assembly, the Moreton Baptist Church and a building belonging to the Church of Jesus Christ of Latter-day Saints.

=== Leisure ===
Moreton Library is situated on Pasture Road, with a nearby youth club and boxing club. A dance club is further along Pasture Road, near to Moreton Shore and the lighthouse. The 4th Moreton Scout Group is situated on Upton Road.

==== Public Houses ====
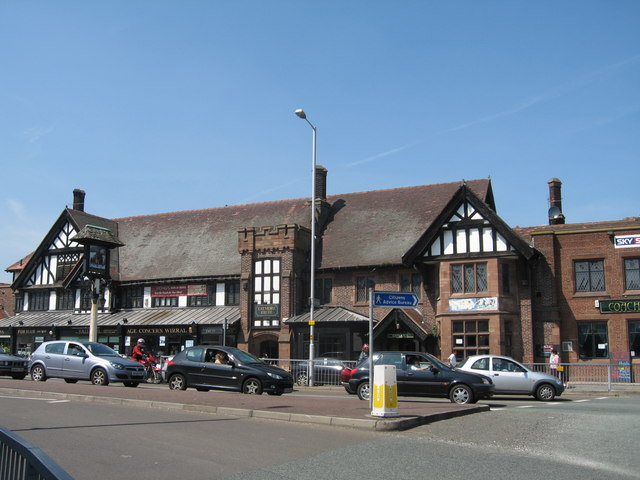
The Coach & Horses public house

Public houses include the Coach & Horses Inn which opened in 1928, The Grange, The Lottie Dod, named after local athlete Lottie Dod, The Farmers Arms, The Sandbrook and The Armchair (currently closed). Former pubs included the Morton Arms, noted for its incorrect spelling, although it is thought to be an external source and not intended as Moreton, the Millhouse (demolished 2018) and the Plough Inn (demolished).

==== Parks and Commons ====
Parks include Lingham Park and Upton Park; Ditton Lane Nature Reserve is sited towards the coast. In the North Wirral Coastal Park, Leasowe Lighthouse was built in 1763 and is the oldest brick-built lighthouse in Britain. The lighthouse was built because of the sandbanks just offshore. It has been restored and is open to the public at times.

=== Sport ===
The Moreton Hills Golf Centre has a driving range, which is situated adjacent to the Tarran Way Industrial Estate. Moreton Football Club was on Upton Road and is now based at Sandbrook Lane, as Sandbrook FC.

Moreton is also home to New Brighton Rugby Club.

== Notable people ==
- Lottie Dod, English sportswoman, established a ladies' golf club in Moreton, in 1894.
- Helen Forrester, English author, lived in Moreton during World War II.
- Daniel Ilabaca, founder of World Freerunning and Parkour Federation, born in Moreton.
- William Inman, English industrialist, buried in Moreton.
- Frank 'Titch' Mason, prize winning jockey, died in 1969. He used his prize money to help build many shops in the area.
- Paul Rutherford, English footballer, born in Moreton.
- Earnie Shavers (1944-2022) boxer, lived in Moreton between 1998-2008 when working in Liverpool.
- Jonathan Walters, Irish international footballer, born in Moreton.
