= Hoylake Open Championships =

Defunct tennis tournament
- Tour: ILTF Circuit
- Founded: 1930; 95 years ago
- Abolished: 1974; 51 years ago
- Location: West Kirby, Cheshire, England
- Venue: Ashton Park
- Surface: Grass/Clay

The Hoylake Open Championships also known as the Rothman's Hoylake Open Championships (for sponsorship reasons) was a men's and women's grass court tennis tournament founded in 1930 as the Hoylake and West Kirby Open. The event was staged annually at Ashton Park, West Kirby, Cheshire, England until 1974.

== History ==
On 25 August 1930 the Hoylake and West Kirby Open lawn tennis tournament was established. The tournament was unique in that it was played on public tennis courts at the Ashton Park, West Kirby, Cheshire. It began mainly as a local British event for the first couple of decades It then began to attract international players from the 1950s onward. The tournament continued under same the brand name until 1966. In 1967 the newspaper company the Liverpool Daily Post and Echo Ltd took over sponsorship of the event, and it was rebraded as Liverpool Daily Post and Echo Hoylake Open. In 1970 the tobacco company Rothmans International took over sponsorship of the tournament. It became a major stop on the ILTF Circuit in July just after Wimbledon until its demise in the mid-1970s.

In 1960 and from 1967 the tournament was also valid as North of England Championships with the winners succeeding to both titles. The tournament was predominantly played on grass courts except for the 1974 edition that was played on clay courts.

== Finals ==
=== Men's Singles ===
Incomplete roll includes:

Hoylake and West Kirby Open
Year	Winners	Runners-up	Score
1949	(United Kingdom) W. Devine	(United Kingdom) G.J. Chibbett	3-6, 9–7, 6-2
1950	(United Kingdom) T.A. Cowdy	(United Kingdom) G.J. Chibbett	4-6, 7–5, 6-4
1951	(South Africa) David Samaai	(Federation of Malaya) Chew Bee Ong	6-2, 9-7
1952	(Hong Kong) Koon Hung Ip	(Poland) Ignacy Tloczynski	6-2, 6-3
1953	(United Kingdom) Gerry Oakley	(Poland) Ignacy Tloczynski	6-4, 7-5
1954	(United Kingdom) Gerry Oakley (2)	(Hong Kong) Koon Hung Ip	6-2, 7-5
1955	(United Kingdom) Gerry Oakley (3)	(United Kingdom) Colin Hannam	7-5, 5–7, 6-3
1956	(Australia) John O'Brien	(Southern Rhodesia) Don Black	6-2, 6-4
1957	(Australia) Peter Frankland	(Southern Rhodesia) Don Black	6-3, 9–7, 6-2
1958	(Venezuela) Isaías Pimentel	(Southern Rhodesia) Roy Stillwell	10-8, 6-2
1959	(India) Ramanathan Krishnan	(India) Premjit Lall	6-2, 6-1
1960	(South Africa) Bertie Gaertner	(South Africa) David Samaai	6-1, 2–6, 6-4
1961	(Australia) John Hillebrand	(Australia) Martin Mulligan	6-3, 6-4
1962	(United Kingdom) Roger Becker	(United Kingdom) Billy Knight	6-3, 2–6, 6-4
1963	(Australia) Bob Howe	(Australia) Martin Mulligan	6-4, 8-6
1964	(Australia) John Hillebrand (2)	(Australia) Fred Stolle	divided title
1965	(United Kingdom) Mike Sangster	(South Africa) Bob Hewitt	6-4, 6-3
1966	(United Kingdom) Mike Sangster (2)	(South Africa) Bob Hewitt	6-1, 6-1
Hoylake Open
1967	(Australia) John Newcombe	(United Kingdom) Roger Taylor	7-5, 3–6, 6-3
1968	(United Kingdom) Mike Sangster (3)	(United States) Herb Fitzgibbon	2-6, 6–4, 12-10
Open era
1969	(Australia) Ray Ruffels	(New Zealand) Brian Fairlie	6-3, 6-3
Hoylake Open Championships
1970	(Australia) John Newcombe (2)	(Australia) Owen Davidson	4-6, 9–7, 6-4
1971	(Rhodesia) Andrew Pattison	(India) Jaidip Mukerjea	6-2, 5–7, 6-2
1972	(Rhodesia) Douglas Irvine	(Australia) Ray Keldie	divided title
1973	(Australia) Bob Giltinan	(Australia) Owen Davidson	1-6, 6–3, 6-2
1974	(South Africa) Bernie Mitton	(South Africa) John Yuill	6-4, 6-4

=== Women's singles ===
Incomplete roll includes.

Hoylake and West Kirby Open
Year	Winners	Runners-up	Score
1949	(United Kingdom) Mrs B. Dixon	(United Kingdom) Mrs P. Williams	6-4, 6-1
1950	(United Kingdom) Ann Layfield	(United Kingdom) Peggy Astill Knight	6-3, 1–6, 6-2
1951	(United Kingdom) Ann Layfield (2)	(United Kingdom) Elsie Hamilton Phillips	7-5, 1–6, 6-2
1952	(United States) Rosemary Walsh	(United Kingdom) Georgie Woodgate	2-6, 6–2, 6-3
1953	(United Kingdom) Mary Harris	(New Zealand) Evelyn Attwood	7-5, 5–7, 6-4
1954	(United Kingdom) Joan Curry	(United Kingdom) Georgie Woodgate	10-8, 6-1
1955	(United Kingdom) Shirley Bloomer	(United Kingdom) Rita Bentley	6-3, 6-0
1956	(United Kingdom) Shirley Bloomer (2)	(United Kingdom) Georgie Woodgate	6-0, 6-1
1957	(United Kingdom) Margaret R. O'Donnell	(Australia) Kay Newcombe	6-3, 6-4
1958	(United Kingdom) Margaret R. O'Donnell (2)	(New Zealand) Sonia Cox	6-1, 6-3
1959	(United Kingdom) Sheila Armstrong	(United Kingdom) Deidre Catt	5-7, 7–5, 6-2
1960	(South Africa) Renée Schuurman	(United Kingdom) Sheila Armstrong	6-3, 7-5
1961	(United Kingdom) Margaret R. O'Donnell (3)	(United Kingdom) Louise Grundy	6-0, 6-0
1962	(United Kingdom) Angela Mortimer	(Australia) Jill Blackman	6-4, 6-4
1963	(United Kingdom) Ann Haydon Jones	(Australia) Jill Blackman	6-2, 6-1
1964	(United Kingdom) Rita Bentley	(Australia) Madonna Schacht	divided the title
1965	(Australia) Margaret Smith	(Australia) Judy Tegart	6-4, 6-4
1966	(Australia) Margaret Smith (2)	(South Africa) Annette Van Zyl	3-6, 6–1, 6-4
Hoylake Open
1967	(United Kingdom) Virginia Wade	(Australia) Judy Tegart	6-3, 6-4
1968	(Australia) Margaret Smith Court (3)	(United Kingdom) Virginia Wade	6-2, 6-4
Open era
1969	(United Kingdom) Virginia Wade (2)	(United Kingdom) Christine Truman Janes	0-6, 6–4, 8-6
Hoylake Open Championships
1970	(Australia) Evonne Goolagong	(Australia) Kerry Melville	2-6, 6–2, 6-1
1971	(United States) Billie Jean Moffitt King	(United States) Rosie Casals	6-3, 6-3
1972	(Australia) Evonne Goolagong (2)	(Netherlands) Betty Stöve	divided the title
1973	(United States) Patti Hogan	(United States) Sharon Walsh	11-9, 4–6, 6-4
1974	(United Kingdom) Jackie Fayter	(United States) Patti Hogan	6-0, 7-5

== Event names ==
- Hoylake and West Kirby Open (1930-1966)
- Liverpool Daily Post and Echo Hoylake Open (1967-1969)
- Rothman's Hoylake Open Championships (1970-1974)

== Tournament records ==
=== Men's singles ===
- Most Men's Titles: (United Kingdom) Gerry Oakley & (United Kingdom) Mike Sangster (3)
- Most Men's Finals: (United Kingdom) Gerry Oakley & (United Kingdom) Mike Sangster (3)

=== Women's singles ===
- Most Women's Titles: (United Kingdom) Margaret O'Donnell & (Australia) Margaret Smith Court (3)
- Most Women's Finals: (United Kingdom) Georgie Woodgate & (United Kingdom) Margaret O'Donnell & (Australia) Margaret Smith Court (3)
