= Town Meadow railway station =

Proposed railway station in Wirral, England

Town Meadow

General information
- Location: Moreton, Metropolitan Borough of Wirral; England
- Coordinates: 53.4043°N 3.1354°W
- Grid reference: SJ246903
- Managed by: Merseyrail
Location

Town Meadow is a proposed railway station to serve the west of Moreton near Meols in the Wirral, England. The station would be situated on the West Kirby branch of the Wirral Line.

The planned station forms part of the wider Local Transport Plan for Merseyside and is included on page 139 of the 2011–2015 document among other proposed stations at Carr Mill, Beechwood, Woodchurch and Deeside.

Merseytravel found in a survey carried out in 2010 that support for the station was high. The proposed station would serve existing and new developments in Moreton.

The Under-Secretary of State for Transport, Paul Maynard MP, visited the site in April 2017 with local councillors, to back calls for the building of the station. It was revealed that Merseytravel already own the land, but neither they nor Wirral Council had applied for a grant from the government's New Stations Fund. Merseytravel defended their decision, claiming that their plans for the station were not sufficiently advanced to bid for funding. The October 2017 Liverpool City Region Combined Authority update to the Long Term Rail Strategy mentions that station as being built between Network Rail Control Periods CP5 and CP7.

As of September 2025, there are no active plans to develop the station but the project remains as a goal of Merseyrail's Long Term Rail Strategy.

The land for the station has been reserved by the Metropolitan Borough of Wirral's local planning authority, which considers the station to be justified by the size of the catchment population.

== See also ==
- Birkenhead Railway

Preceding station	Future services	Following station
Meols towards West Kirby	Merseyrail; Wirral Line; West Kirby Branch	Moreton towards Liverpool Central
