= Margaret O'Donnell =

Margaret O'Donnell may refer to:

- Margaret O'Donnell (poet), see 1963 in poetry
- Margaret H. O'Donnell (born 1935), Australian tennis player active from 1949 to 1956
- Margaret R. O'Donnell (born 1938), British tennis player active from 1956 to 1965
- Margaret O'Donnell, character in 17 Again (film)
