= Dantec (company) =

British composite hose manufacturer

- Company type: Private company
- Industry: Manufacturing
- Founded: 1967; 58 years ago
- Founder: Dan Davies
- Headquarters: Moreton, Wirral Peninsula, United Kingdom
- Area served: Worldwide
- Key people: John Laidlaw
- Products: Composite hoses
- Owner: Elaflex
- Number of employees: 48 (2012)
- Website: dantec.com

Dantec is a British manufacturers of composite hoses. It is one of the world's top three largest manufacturer of such industrial hoses and the biggest of its kind in the UK. The company was founded in 1969 in Moreton, Wirral. It has been owned by German manufacturer of refueling equipment, Elaflex since 2016.

Dantec hoses are used for the transfer of oil, liquefied gas and petrochemicals. Applications include ship to ship, ship to shore, ship to tank, plant to truck, truck to tank and the plant and rail car transfer of fuels and hazardous liquids.

Dantec's head office and manufacturing base is in Wirral, Merseyside. The firm employs 48 staff and its managing director is John Laidlaw. In 2012 Dantec's turnover rose to £5.6m and the firm doubled sales to the Middle East. As of 2012 70% of Dantec's sales came from exports.

== History ==
Dantec was initially founded as a gasket manufacturer by Dan Davies in 1969. The firm supplied its gaskets to the Vauxhall Motors car plant in Ellesmere Port. Dantec was also a distributor of third-party products, including composite hose. The firm began manufacturing composite hose in 1978.

In 2002 Dantec remodelled its business to focus on manufacturing and selling composite hoses. This process was managed by current managing director John Laidlaw who was brought into the firm in 2001 to help rationalise the business. Post 2002 the firm focused greater energy on exports which have increased from 25pc of product sales in 2001 to 70pc in 2011.

In 2004 Dantec founder Dan Davies sold the company to his brother Eric Davies. In 2010 John Laidlaw was joined by co-directors Jon Loach and Derek Connolly in a management buy-out of the company backed by private equity firm Maven Capital Partners. The purchase was completed in September 2011.

On March 1, 2016, the company was acquired by German manufacturer of refueling equipment, Elaflex.

== Products ==
Dantec manufactures a range of composite hoses. Each hose is designed and constructed specifically for its end use. The firm's products include the Danoil petrocarbon hose, the Danchem chemical hose, the Danflon ECTFE and FIRESAFE. Dantec composite hoses are a construction of inner wires, liners, sealing films, covers and an outer wire.

=== FIRESAFE ===
Dantec's FIRESAFE hose is fire resistant for in excess of 30 minutes at temperatures up to 1,200 °C. It is designed to carry highly flammable liquids in environments where there is increased risk of explosion.

FIRESAFE is made of a series of specially designed ceramic cloths and heat reflective films which counter the radiant heat effects of fire. This construction allows vapour to burn off slowly as the increased heat of the liquid inside the hose vaporises and seeks to escape. The fire retardant hose remains intact under fire attack and will not forcefully expel its contents. This construction retains the advantages of composite hose including flexibility and durability.

== Territories ==
Dantec currently exports to more than 50 countries worldwide and estimates the global composite hose sector to be worth approximately £45m. The firm operates through a network of local distributors. As of 2012, 70pc of the firm's sales came from exports.

=== UK ===
Dantec is currently the biggest composite hose manufacturer in the UK. The firm has supplied BP's fleet of tanker trucks for 14 years.

=== North America ===
In 2012 Dantec signed an agency partnership with True North Works in Texas to target the American market and work in conjunction with its master distributor, Accord International. The USA is a developed market which has more than 800 tank storage terminals compared to 650 in the whole European Union. Dantec also has two Canadian distributors Green Line Hose & Fittings in Alberta and Senior Flexonics Ltd in Ontario.

=== Middle East ===
Dantec currently targets the Middle East through a partnership with Flexiflo Corp. In 2012 the firm doubled its regional sales to £270,000.

== Marine ==
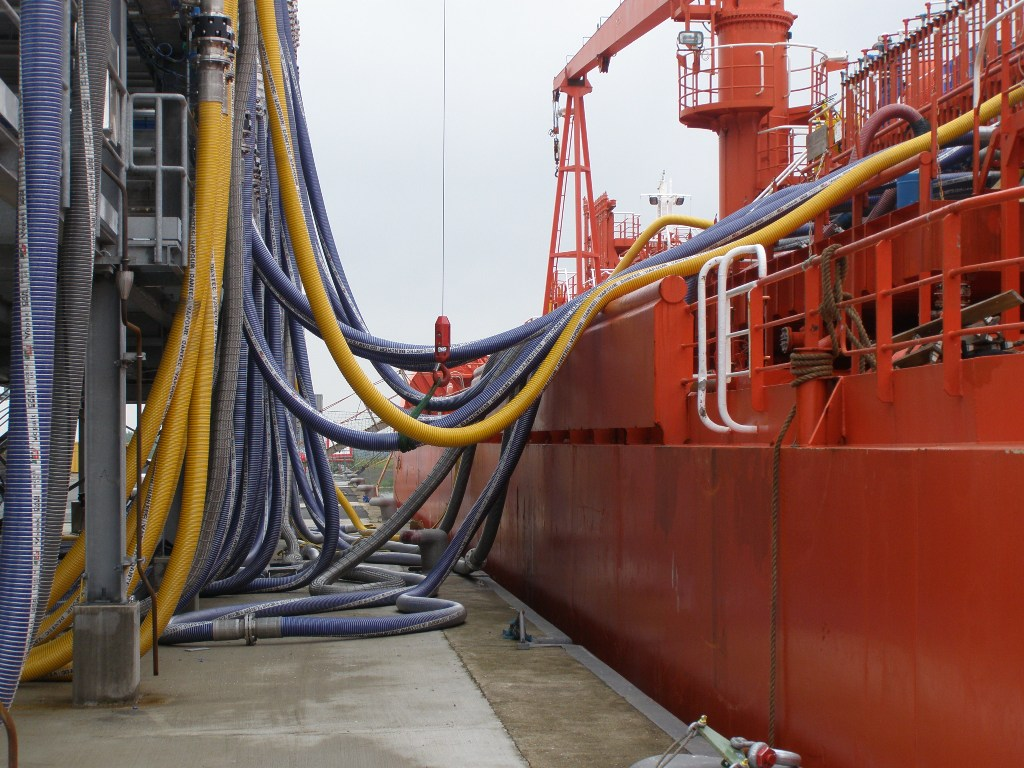
Dantec hoses as used in the ship to shore transfer of fuels and petrochemicals.

A major part of Dantec's work is in offshore and marine applications. Dantec is used in the ship to ship and ship to shore transfer of oil, liquefied gas and petrochemicals.

== Formula One ==
In 1994 Formula One driver Jos Verstappen stopped to refuel during the German Grand Prix in Hockenheim. Moments later he was engulfed in flames when the fuel loading hose ignited and breached its contents. After reviewing Dantec's FIRESAFE hose in action, which is designed not to disintegrate in a fire, Formula One contacted the company the following day. The order was pushed through in time for the next race. From that point on every Formula One team used the Dantec FIRESAFE hose for refuelling for 15 years. At present Formula One does not allow refuelling.
