= North of England Hard Court Championships =

Defunct tennis tournament
- Founded: 1913; 113 years ago
- Abolished: 1988; 38 years ago
- Location: Scarborough, North Yorkshire (1913–55); Southport, Merseyside (1956–88)
- Venue: Yorkshire Lawn Tennis Club; Southport Argyle Lawn Tennis Club
- Surface: Clay

The North of England Hard Court Championships, later known as the Wilson North of England Hard Court Tennis Championships for sponsorship reasons, was a combined men's and women's clay court tennis tournament established in 1913 and ran until 1988.

== History ==
The North of England Hard Court Championships was a combined men's and women's clay court tennis tournament first established in 1913 at the Yorkshire Lawn Tennis Club. Scarborough, Yorkshire, England. In 1956 the tournament changed location to the Argyle Lawn Tennis Club, Southport, England for the duration of its run until 1988.

In 1941 the Argyle Lawn Tennis Club established the Southport Easter Open tournament, and from 1956 that tournament was incorporated jointly with the North of England Hard Court Championships. From 1981 to 1984 the championships were sponsored by the paint company 'Weatherall' and was known as the Weatherall North of England Hard Court Championships. In 1985 the company Wilson Sporting Goods took over sponsorship of the event and was known as the Wilson North of England Hard Court Tennis Championships until 1988 then was discontinued.

== Finals ==
=== Men's singles ===
(Incomplete roll)

Year	Champion	Runner-up	Score
North of England Hard Court Championships
1920	(United Kingdom) Mark Hick	(United Kingdom) Ralph Douglas Watson	6–2, 7–5, 6–4
1922	(United Kingdom) Ernest Bisseker	(United Kingdom) Jack Hillyard	6–3, 5–7, 6–8, 6–2, 6–3
1931	(United Kingdom) Arthur W. Hill	(United Kingdom) Lionel Antrobus	6–1, 6–4
1933	(United Kingdom) John Colin Gregory	(United Kingdom) Donald MacPhail	6–4, 7–5
1934	(South Africa) Vernon Kirby	(United Kingdom) Alan Martin Wedd	6–3, 6–4
1935	(United Kingdom) Raymond Tuckey	(United Kingdom) Pat Sherwood	6–3, 6–3
1936	(United Kingdom) Raymond Tuckey (2)	(United Kingdom) Pat Sherwood	6–4, 8–6
1937	(United Kingdom) Raymond Tuckey (3)	(United Kingdom) Ronald Alfred Shayes	6–4, 2–6, 6–3
1938	(United Kingdom) Murray Deloford	(United Kingdom) Harold Hare	6–3, 4–6, 6–1
1939	(United Kingdom) George Godsell	(United Kingdom) Pat Sherwood	6–2, 6–2
1940/1945	Not held (due to world war two)		
1946	(Poland) Ignacy Tłoczyński	(Australia) Jack Harper	8–6, 3–6, 6–1
1947	(Poland) Ignacy Tłoczyński (2)	(United Kingdom) Tony Mottram	6–4, 6–3
1948	(Poland) Ignacy Tłoczyński (3)	(United Kingdom) George Godsell	7–5, 6–0
1949	(Poland) Ignacy Tłoczyński (4)	(United Kingdom) Bobby Meredith	6–0, 6–0
1950	(Poland) Ignacy Tłoczyński (5)	(United Kingdom) Derrick Leyland	6–0, 6–1
1951	(Poland) Czeslaw Spychala	(United Kingdom) Donald Butler	6–4, 4–6, 7–5
1952	(Sweden) Staffan Stockenberg	(Poland) Czeslaw Spychala	6–4, 6–4
1953	(United Kingdom) John Barrett	(Poland) Ignacy Tłoczyński	6–4, 6–4
1954	(Poland) Ignacy Tłoczyński (6)	(Iran) Matthew Farhang Mohtadi	6–3, 3–6, 6–1
1955	(United Kingdom) Ivor Warwick	(Australia) Ian A. Macdonald	6–2, 6–3
1956	(United Kingdom) John Horn	(United Kingdom) Mike Hann	7–5, 4–6, 6–4
1957	(Canada) Robert Bédard	(United Kingdom) Alan Mills	6–2, 6–3
1959	(United Kingdom) Alan Mills	(United Kingdom) Malcolm Gracie	6–1, 6–2
1960	(New Zealand) Lew Gerrard	(United Kingdom) Alan Mills	4–6, 6–2, 6–4
1961	(Australia) Tony Pickard	(United Kingdom) Mike Hann	6–4, 6–3
1962	(United Kingdom) Jimmy Tattersall	(United Kingdom) Trevor Adamson	4–6, 6–2, 6–1
North of England Hard Court Lawn Tennis Championships
1963	(United Kingdom) Jimmy Tattersall (2)	(United Kingdom) Malcolm Gracie	8–6, 6–2
1964	(United Kingdom) Clay Iles	(United Kingdom) Mark Cox	7–5, 6–2
1965	(United Kingdom) G.B. Jones	(United Kingdom) Geoff Stubbs	7–6, 6–2
1966	(United Kingdom) Billy Knight	(United Kingdom) John Roderick Mcdonald	6–1, 6–2
1967	(United Kingdom) Billy Knight (2)	(United Kingdom) John Roderick Mcdonald	6–3, 6–4
Open era
North of England Hard Court Open Championships
1968	(United Kingdom) Geoff Stubbs	(United Kingdom) David Gunson	6–3, 6–3
1969	(United Kingdom) Clay Iles (2)	(New Zealand) Robert G. Clarke	6–4, 6–3
1970	(Australia) Allan McDonald	(United Kingdom) Ken Weatherley	6–2, 4–6, 6–4
1972	(New Zealand) Robert G. Clarke	(United Kingdom) John Howarth	
1973	(United Kingdom) John Marnoch	(United Kingdom) Robert Armytage	6–4, 6–1
1974	(United Kingdom) Geoffrey Paish	(South Africa) Willem Prinsloo	6–1, 6–7, 7–5
1976	(United Kingdom) Roger Webb	(United Kingdom) Antony Fawley	7–6, 6–4
1977	(United Kingdom) Neil Rayner	(United Kingdom) Nigel Sears	6–2, 1–6, 6–2
1978	(United Kingdom) Andrew Jarrett	(United Kingdom) Trevor Heath	6-1, 6–0
1979	(United Kingdom) Harvey Becker	(United Kingdom) Kevin Harris	0–6, 7–6, 6–2
1980	(United Kingdom) Keith Gilbert	(United Kingdom) Nigel Sears	6–0, 6–2
Weatherall North of England Hard Court Tennis Championships
1981	(United Kingdom) Nick Brown	(United Kingdom) Simon Ickringill	
1982	(United Kingdom) Michael Appleton	(United Kingdom) Neil Rayner	6–3, 7–6
1983	(United Kingdom) Neil Rayner	(United Kingdom) Harvey Becker	6–4, 4–6, 6–1

=== Women's singles ===
(Incomplete roll)

Year	Champion	Runner-up	Score
North of England Hard Court Championships
1913	(United Kingdom) Mary Gray Welsh	(United Kingdom) Jessie Green	6–1, 6–1
1914	(United Kingdom) Mrs E. Wilkinson	(United Kingdom) Mary Gray Welsh	6–3, 3–6, 6–2
1915/1918	Not held (due to world war one)		
1919	(United Kingdom) Phyllis Satterthwaite	(United Kingdom) Mrs A. Wilkinson	6–1, 6–2
1920	(United Kingdom) Elsie Goodlass Holtby	(United Kingdom) Mrs Hobson	2–6, 6–2, 6–2
1921	(United Kingdom) Elsie Goodlass Holtby (2)	(United Kingdom) Mrs Hobson	6–4, 6–3
1922	(United Kingdom) Phyllis Satterthwaite (2)	(United Kingdom) Joan Austin	6–1, 6–3
1923	(United Kingdom) Norah Fosdick Middleton	(United Kingdom) Mary Gray Welsh	6–2, 5–7, 7–5
1924	(United Kingdom) Ruth Watson	(United Kingdom) Lesley Cadle	6–4, 7–9, 6–4
1925	(United Kingdom) Ruth Watson (2)	(United Kingdom) Elsie Goodlass Holtby	6–2, 6–1
1926	(United Kingdom) Ruth Watson (3)	(United Kingdom) Mrs Wormald	6–1, 5–7, 6–1
1927	(United Kingdom) Aurea Edgington	(United Kingdom) Eileen Connell	6–4, 6–2
1928	(United Kingdom) Elsie Goldsack	(United Kingdom) Aurea Edgington	6–3, 6–4
1929	(United Kingdom) Elsie Goldsack (2)	(United Kingdom) Dorothy Anderson	6–3, 8–6
1930	(United Kingdom) Dorothy Anderson	(United Kingdom) Janet Lawson	6–1, 6–2
1931	(United Kingdom) Dorothy Anderson (2)	(United Kingdom) R. Bray	6–2, 7–5
1932	(United Kingdom) Freda James	(United Kingdom) Janet Lawson Walker	6–2, 7–5
1933	(United Kingdom) Freda James (2)	(United Kingdom) Edie Rudd Luxton	6–3, 6–4
1934	(United Kingdom) Doris Bullock	(United Kingdom) Nancy Kidson	2–6, 6–2, 6–3
1935	(Australia) Joan Hartigan	(United Kingdom) Rosemary Smith	6–2, 6–2
1936	(United Kingdom) Nina Brown	(United Kingdom) Rosemary Smith	3–6, 6–2, 6–2
1937	(United Kingdom) Thelma Jarvis	(United Kingdom) Denise Huntbach	6–3, 6–2
1938	(United Kingdom) Gladys Southwell	(United Kingdom) Nina Brown	6–4, 4–0 ret.
1939	(Hungary) Suzy Kormoczy	(United Kingdom) Nora Maingay	6–3, 6–2
1940/1945	Not held (due to world war two)		
1946	(United Kingdom) Jean Quertier	(United Kingdom) Sheila Barraclough	6–1, 7–5
1947	(United Kingdom) Joan Curry	(United Kingdom) Joy Gannon	6–3, 6–2
1948	(United Kingdom) Joan Curry (2)	(United Kingdom) Peggy Dawson-Scott	6–0, 6–1
1949	(United Kingdom) Joan Curry (3)	(United Kingdom) Lesley Hunter Fulton	6–0, 6–1
1950	(Australia) Thelma Coyne Long	(United Kingdom) Jean Quertier	6–4, 7–5
1951	(United Kingdom) Susan Partridge	(United Kingdom) Helen Fletcher	6–3, 3–6, 10–8
1952	(United Kingdom) Jean Petchell	(United Kingdom) Valerie Lewis	6–3, 7–5
1953	(United Kingdom) Pat Harrison	(United Kingdom) Jean Petchell	6–3, 6–2
1954	(United Kingdom) Barbara Knapp	(United Kingdom) Jean Petchell	7–5, 6–3
1955	(United Kingdom) Georgie Woodgate	(United Kingdom) Barbara Knapp	6–1, 6–3
1956	(United Kingdom) Angela Buxton	(United Kingdom) Elaine Watson	6–0, 6–1
1958	(United Kingdom) Angela Buxton (2)	(United Kingdom) Margaret R. O'Donnell	6–2, 6–3
1959	(United Kingdom) Shirley Bloomer	(Australia) Margaret H. O'Donnell	6–3, 6–3
1960	(United Kingdom) Shirley Bloomer Brasher (3)	(United Kingdom) Elaine Shenton	6–3, 6–1
1961	(United Kingdom) Shirley Bloomer Brasher (4)	(United Kingdom) Margaret R. O'Donnell	7–5, 6–2
1962	(United Kingdom) Margaret Cooper	(United Kingdom) E. Smith	6–1, 6–4
North of England Hard Court Lawn Tennis Championships
1963	(United Kingdom) Margaret R. O'Donnell	(United Kingdom) E. Smith	4–6, 6–2, 6–4
1964	(United Kingdom) Nell Truman	(United Kingdom) Heather Allen	2–6, 6–2, 6–1
1965	(United Kingdom) Margaret R. O'Donnell (2)	(United Kingdom) J. Hope	7–5, 6–3
1966	(United Kingdom) Margaret R. O'Donnell (3)	(United Kingdom) Alex McAlpine	6–1, 5–7, 6–0
1967	(United Kingdom) Rita Bentley	(Czechoslovakia) Jitka Volavková	9–7, 6–3
Open era
North of England Hard Court Open Championships
1968	(United Kingdom) Janice Townsend	(United Kingdom) C. Penn	divided title
1969	(United Kingdom) Shirley Bloomer Brasher (5)	(United Kingdom) Janice Townsend	6–1, 3–6, 6–0
1970	(Australia) Evonne Goolagong	(United Kingdom) Joyce Barclay Williams	6–2, 6–3
1972	(United Kingdom) Veronica Burton	(United Kingdom) Shirley Bloomer Brasher	6–1, 6–3
1973	(United Kingdom) R. Allen	(United Kingdom) A. Morris	4–6, 6–0, 6–3
1974	(United Kingdom) Lindsey Beaven	(United Kingdom) Corinne Molesworth	6–0, 6–4
1976	(United Kingdom) Michelle Tyler	(United Kingdom) Corinne Molesworth	6–1, 6–1
1977	(United Kingdom) Anthea Cooper	(United Kingdom) Debbie Jevans	6–4, 3–6, 6–2
1978	(United Kingdom) Corinne Molesworth	(United Kingdom) Annette Coe	6–7, 7–6, 6–3
1979	(United Kingdom) Cathy Drury	(United Kingdom) Jane Plackett	7–5, 7–6
1980	(United Kingdom) Belinda Thompson	(United Kingdom) Joy Tacon	2–6, 6–1, 6–0
Weatherall North of England Hard Court Tennis Championships
1981	(United Kingdom) Lisa Pennington	(United Kingdom) Denise Parnell	6–1, 6–2
1982	(United Kingdom) Michelle Tyler (2)	(United Kingdom) Kate Brasher	3–6, 6–4, 6–2
1983	(United Kingdom) Kate Brasher	(United Kingdom) Sara Gomer	6–3, 2–6, 6–4

== Event name ==
- North of England Hard Court Championships (1913–1962)
- North of England Hard Court Lawn Tennis Championships (1963–1967)
- North of England Hard Court Open Championships (1968–1980)
- Weatherall North of England Hard Court Tennis Championships (1981–1984)
- Wilson North of England Hard Court Tennis Championships (1985–1988)

== Locations and Venues ==
The championships were held at the Yorkshire Lawn Tennis Club. Scarborough, Yorkshire, England from 1913 to 1955. In 1956 event was transferred to the Southport Argyle Lawn Tennis Club, Southport, Merseyside until 1988.

== Tournament records ==
=== Men's ===
- Most Singles Titles: (Poland) Ignacy Tłoczyński (6)
- Most Singles Finals: (Poland) Ignacy Tłoczyński (7)

=== Women's ===
- Most Singles Titles: (United Kingdom) Shirley Bloomer Brasher (5)
- Most Singles Finals: (United Kingdom) Shirley Bloomer Brasher (6)

== See also ==
- North of England Championships (grass court tournament)
