= Meols Park =

Public park in Wirral, England

- Meols Park
- Interactive map of Meols Park
- Type: Public park
- Location: Meols, Merseyside
- Coordinates: 53.40211°N 3.15660°W
- Operator: Metropolitan Borough of Wirral
- Open: All year
- Status: Open

Meols Park and Recreation Ground is located in Meols on the Wirral Peninsula, England. The park consists of a small playground area and a larger grassed area, with an area for playing football. The park is situated on School Lane and is bordered by Mumfords Lane, Greenwood Road and Dovepoint Road. The park is also near to the North Wirral Coastal Park. There is a community group, known as the Friends of Meols Park, formed in 2007 whose aim was to refurbish and look after the development of the park.

== Friends of Meols Park ==
The local community group was established in October 2007. The Friends of Meols Park work in partnership with the Wirral Council Parks Development Team. The group helps to organise community events every September and November. The Sparks In The Park event is a community firework display. The group also contribute to management of the park. The group also helps to raise funding for improvements and new facilities. The group chairperson is Esther Mcvey.

== Meols Park Celebration Day ==
The Liverpool band China Crisis made an appearance at the Meols Park Celebration Day, on 6 September 2009.

The occasion was to mark the success of the Friends of Meols Park community group, in raising funds to provide a new play area, within the park, with the assistance and guidance of Wirral Council. During the event, the park was filled with families enjoying the entertainment and activities. Entertainment was provided with donkey rides, horse & cart rides, a Punch and Judy show, a Viking show, children's rides and various novelty stalls. The Wirral Community Play Rangers were on hand to organise children's games, and there were mini soccer tournaments for children, with each participant receiving a souvenir medal. Church groups from St Andrew's URC and St Johns provided help with tea and coffee.

The 92.1FM 7Waves Community Radio Roadshow team hosted the event, and presented the entertainment. Local music artistes provided entertainment within a large marquee. A notable person, to make an appearance in the crowd, was Andy McCluskey, the frontman of OMD, who originated in Meols. Liverpool band China Crisis performed "Wishful Thinking", among other songs.
