= Meols railway station =

Railway station serving Meols in Wirral, Merseyside, England

Coordinates: 53.3992°N 3.1552°W

Meols
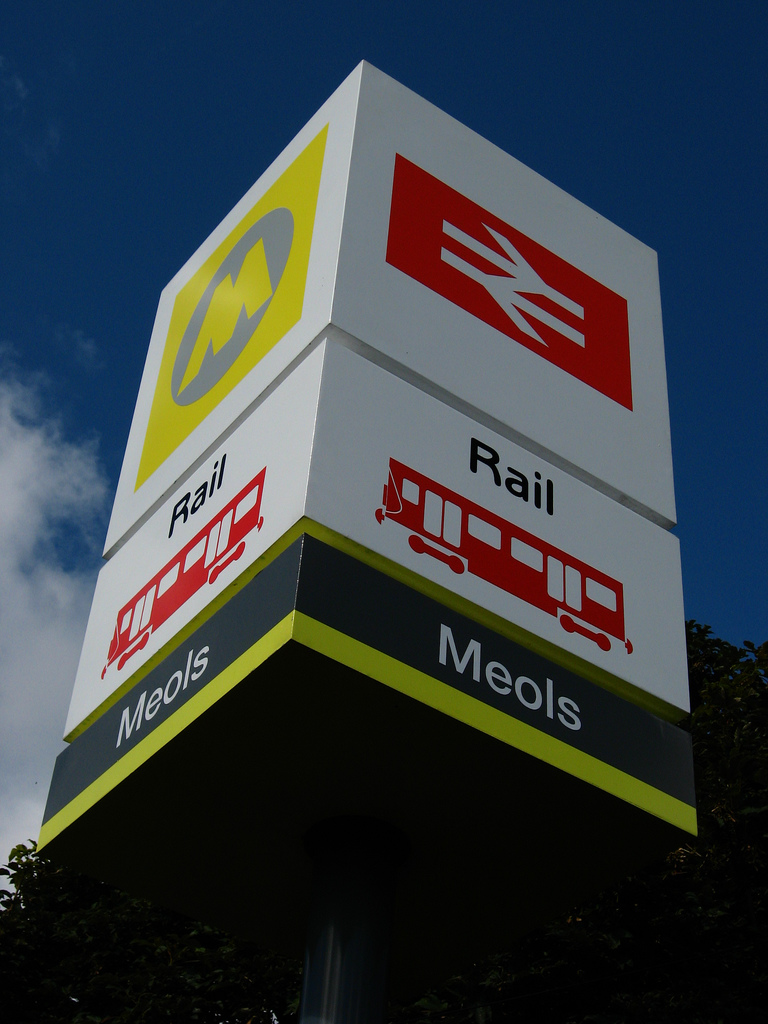
- Meols station sign outside entrance

General information
- Location: Meols, Wirral; England
- Grid reference: SJ233897
- Manager: Merseyrail
- Transit authority: Merseytravel
- Platforms: 2

Other information
- Station code: MEO
- Fare zone: B2
- Classification: DfT category E

Key dates
- 1866 1938: Opened; Rebuilt/Electrified

Passengers
- 2021/22: ▲0.271 million
- 2022/23: ▲0.337 million
- 2023/24: ▲0.370 million
- 2024/25: ▲0.414 million
- 2025/26: ▲0.447 million
Location
Notes
- Passenger statistics from the Office of Rail and Road

Meols railway station is a station serving the village of Meols, in Merseyside, England. It lies on the West Kirby branch of the Wirral Line, part of the Merseyrail network.

== History ==
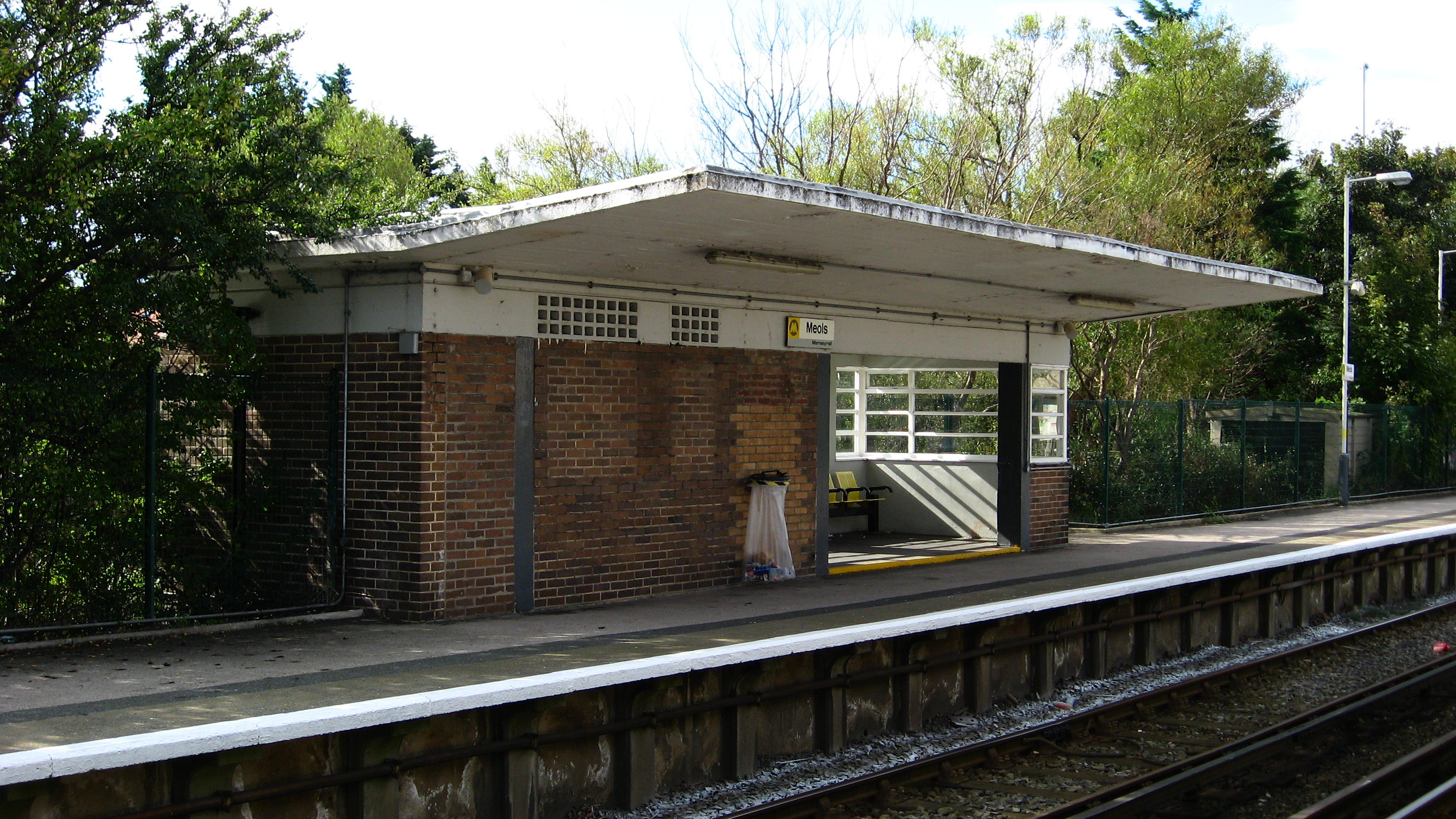
Meols station's art deco passenger shelter

Meols was one of the original stations on the Hoylake Railway, opening in 1866. The Hoylake Railway became part of the Wirral Railway in 1883, which subsequently became part of the London Midland and Scottish Railway in 1923. Through services to Liverpool began in 1938, when the line was electrified. The station was rebuilt to coincide with this.

In 1934 the signal box was closed and semaphore Intermediate Block Signals, controlled from Moreton and Hoylake boxes, were introduced, the only such signals on the Liverpool to West Kirby line. They broke the otherwise long distance between Moreton and Hoylake, the two signal boxes on either side. These semaphore signals remained until 1994 when the line was resignalled with colour-light signals. The station underwent refurbishment with work in 2010 which involved new glazing to the footbridge windows and staircase, redevelopment of existing buildings to provide enclosed passenger waiting shelters, a new passenger toilet and automatic entrance doors to the booking hall. Work began on installing lifts for both of the platforms in 2019 and the lifts opened for use in January 2020.

== Facilities ==
The station is staffed, 15 minutes before the first train and 15 minutes after the last train, and has platform CCTV. Each of the two platforms has a waiting room. There is a payphone, vending machine, booking office and live departure and arrival screens, for passenger information. The station has a free car park, with 62 spaces, as well as a 12-space cycle rack and secure indoor storage for 16 cycles. Lifts serve both platforms allowing for step free access from the ticket office and upper road level.

== Services ==
Current services are every 15 minutes (Monday to Saturday daytime) to West Kirby and Liverpool. At other times, trains operate every 30 minutes. These services are provided by Merseyrail's fleet of Class 777 EMUs.

Preceding station	National Rail	Following station
Manor Road towards West Kirby	Merseyrail; Wirral Line; West Kirby Branch	Moreton towards Liverpool Central
