= Frederick Aspinall =

English cricketer

Personal information
- Full name: Frederick Aspinall
- Born: 2 September 1859; West Kirby, Cheshire, England
- Died: Unknown
- Batting: Unknown

Career statistics
Competition	First-class
Matches	1
Runs scored	27
Batting average	27.00
100s/50s	–/–
Top score	16
Balls bowled	–
Wickets	–
Bowling average	–
5 wickets in innings	–
10 wickets in match	–
Best bowling	–
Catches/stumpings	–/–
- Source: Cricinfo, 29 May 2013

Frederick Aspinall (2 September 1859 – date of death unknown) was an English first-class cricketer. Aspinall's batting style is unknown. He was born at West Kirby, Cheshire.

A club cricketer for Birkenhead Park Cricket Club, Aspinall made a single first-class appearance for a combined Liverpool and District team against Yorkshire in 1892 at Aigburth Cricket Ground, Liverpool. In a match which Liverpool and District won by 6 wickets, Aspinall made scores of 16 in their first-innings, before he was dismissed by Louis Hall, while in their second-innings he ended the innings not out on 11.
