= Coronation Gardens, West Kirby =

Public park in the Wirral, England

Coronation Gardens
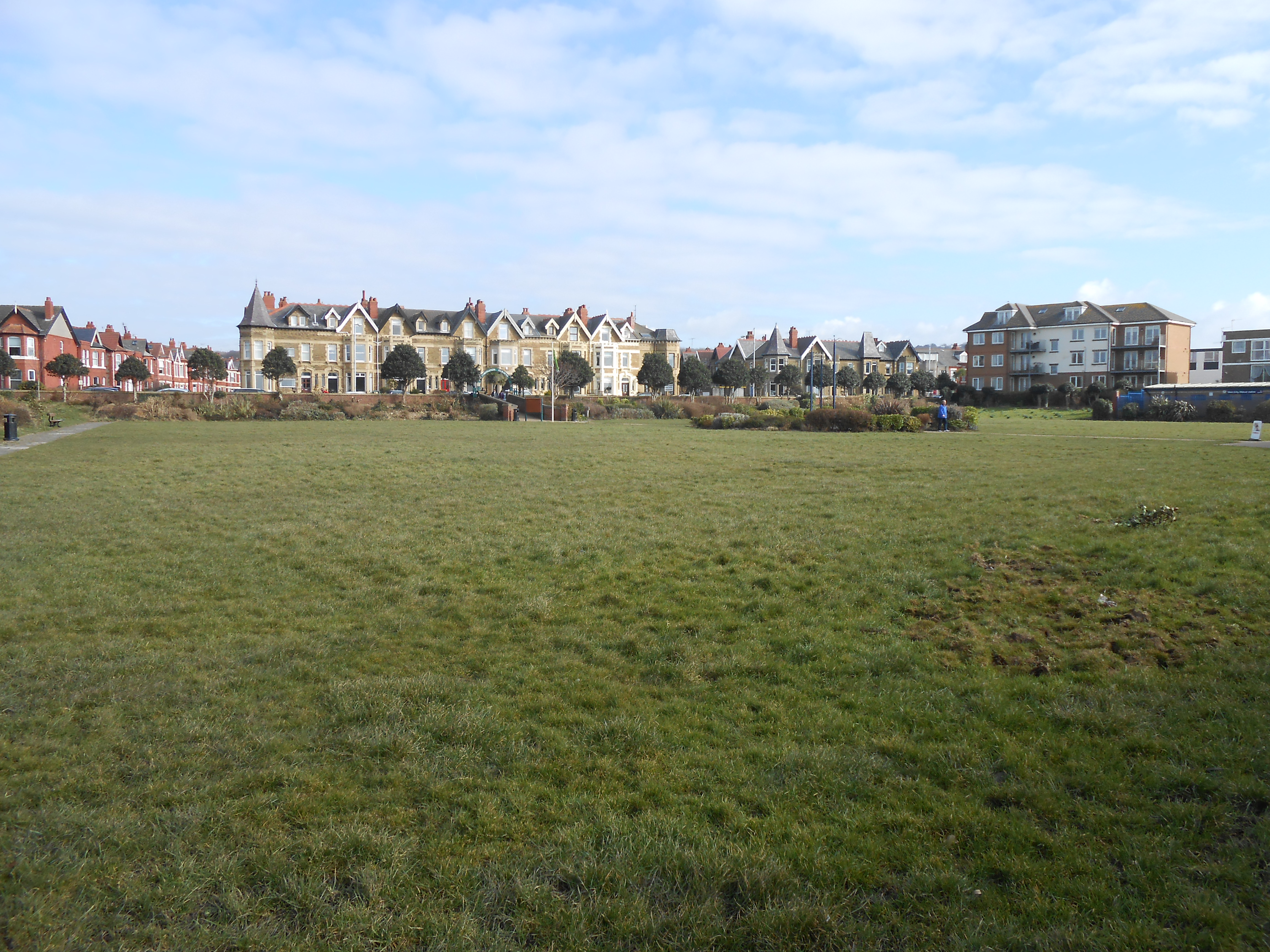
- Coronation Gardens
- Interactive map of Coronation Gardens
- Type: Public park
- Location: West Kirby, Merseyside
- Coordinates: 53.3665°N 3.1827°W
- Created: 1938
- Operator: Metropolitan Borough of Wirral
- Open: All year
- Status: Open

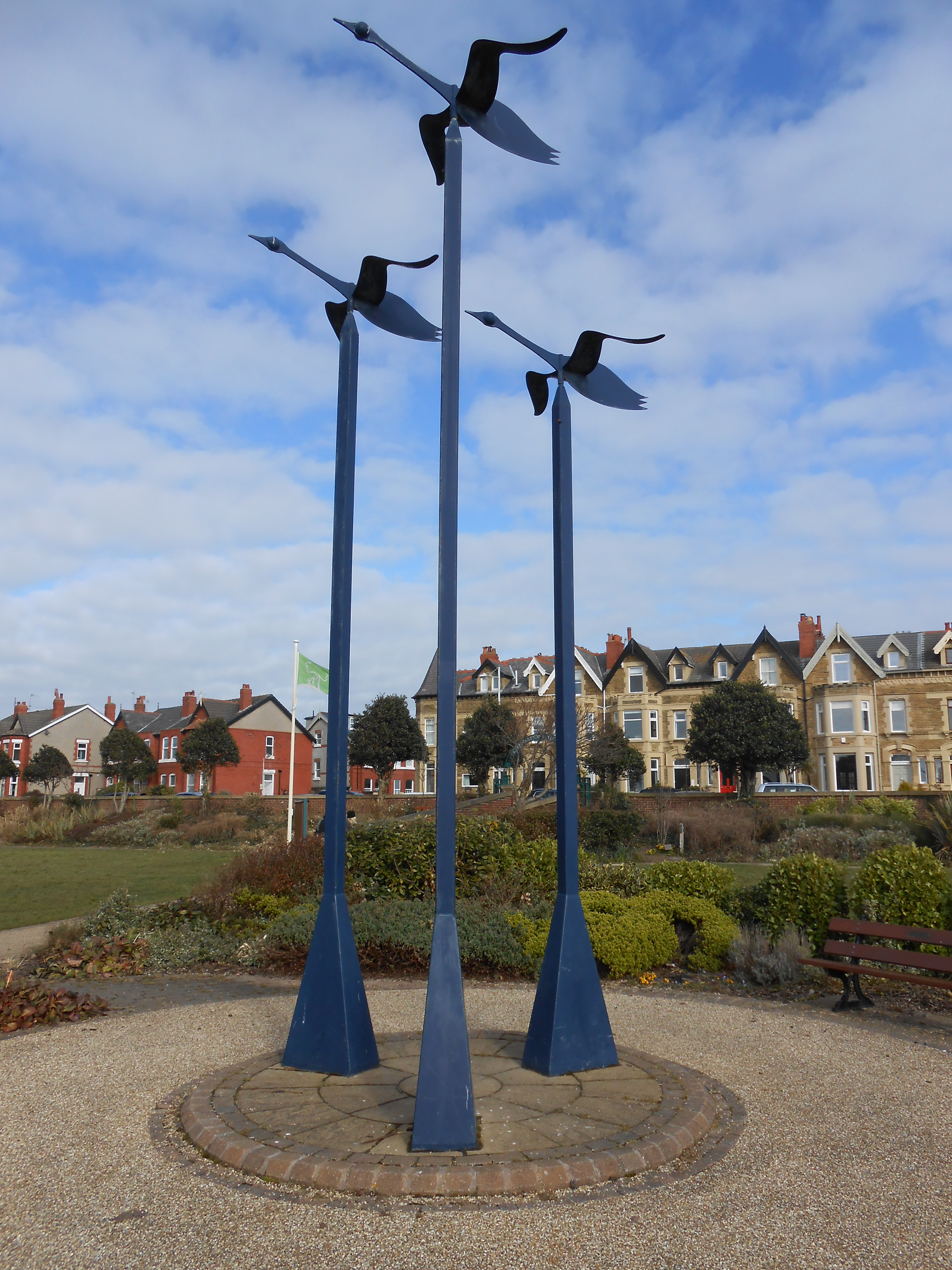
A wind vane sculpture was installed as part of park renovation in 2007

Coronation Gardens is a small public park in the coastal town of West Kirby, on the north-west corner of the Wirral Peninsula. The park was built to commemorate the coronation of George VI and was restored during 2006–7.

Coronation Gardens is located between Banks Road and South Parade. The park is one of several, in Wirral, to receive the Green Flag Award.

== History of the park ==
Coronation Gardens was built in 1938 at a cost of £10,000 and named to mark the coronation of George VI . The area occupied by the park had previously consisted of sand dunes and soil had to be imported to create a medium for plants to grow. The design also included a wall to keep out the tide. The park was originally laid out with traditional ornamental flowerbeds and included a circular pathway and a cafe.

== Park restoration and activities ==
The park was maintained by the local authority, but became neglected during the 1970s and '80s, with original flowerbeds and the circular path being removed to save on maintenance costs. Following public debate about the future of the park, Friends of Coronation Gardens was formed. Renovation took place in 2006-07 and the three-phase programme included a new entrance ramp and archway, relaying of the central path, new seating and maritime planting. A new wind vane sculpture of three wild geese was also installed, representing bird migration found on the surrounding Dee Estuary.

Coronation Gardens hosts a number of events during the year, including a summer Art in the Park exhibition and the Friends of Coronation Gardens Fair.

== External sources ==
- Friends of Coronation Gardens website
