= Margaret R. O'Donnell =

British tennis player

- Country (sports): GBR
- Born: 1938 (age 87–88) Liverpool, Lancashire, England
- Turned pro: 1956 (amateur tour)
- Retired: 1967

Singles
- Career record: 72-67 (52%)
- Career titles: 13

Grand Slam singles results
- Wimbledon: 2R (1959, 1961, 1964, 1965)

Doubles

Grand Slam doubles results
- Wimbledon: 3R (1959, 1965 )

Grand Slam mixed doubles results
- Wimbledon: 2R (1959)

Margaret R. O'Donnell (born 1938 – ) is a retired British tennis player who competed at the Wimbledon Championships between 1959 and 1965. She was active from 1956 to 1967 and won 13 career singles titles.

== Career ==
Margaret was born Liverpool, Lancashire, England as a junior she joined the team at Liverpool Cricket Club. She won Lancashire Junior County Championships twice in 1955.

Her career highlights include winning the North of England Hard Court Championships three times (1963, 1965–1966), the Hoylake and West Kirby Open three times (1957–1958, 1961), the Nottinghamshire Championships (1961), the Lee-on-Solent Open two times (1957–1958), Torquay Open, (1961) St. Annes Open (1962), and the Lancashire Championships (1963).

Additionally she was finalist at the Essex Championships at Frinton-on-Sea (1956), Worthing Open (1958), the Bedford Open two times, (1958–1959), Carmarthenshire Championships at Llanelli two times (1959, 1964), the Scottish Hard Court Championships at St. Andrews (1961).

She played her final tournament in 1967 at the Winchester Open in England where she reached the final, before losing to Britain's Anthea Rigby.
