= West Kirby =

Coastal town in Wirral, Merseyside, England

Coordinates: 53.373°N 3.184°W

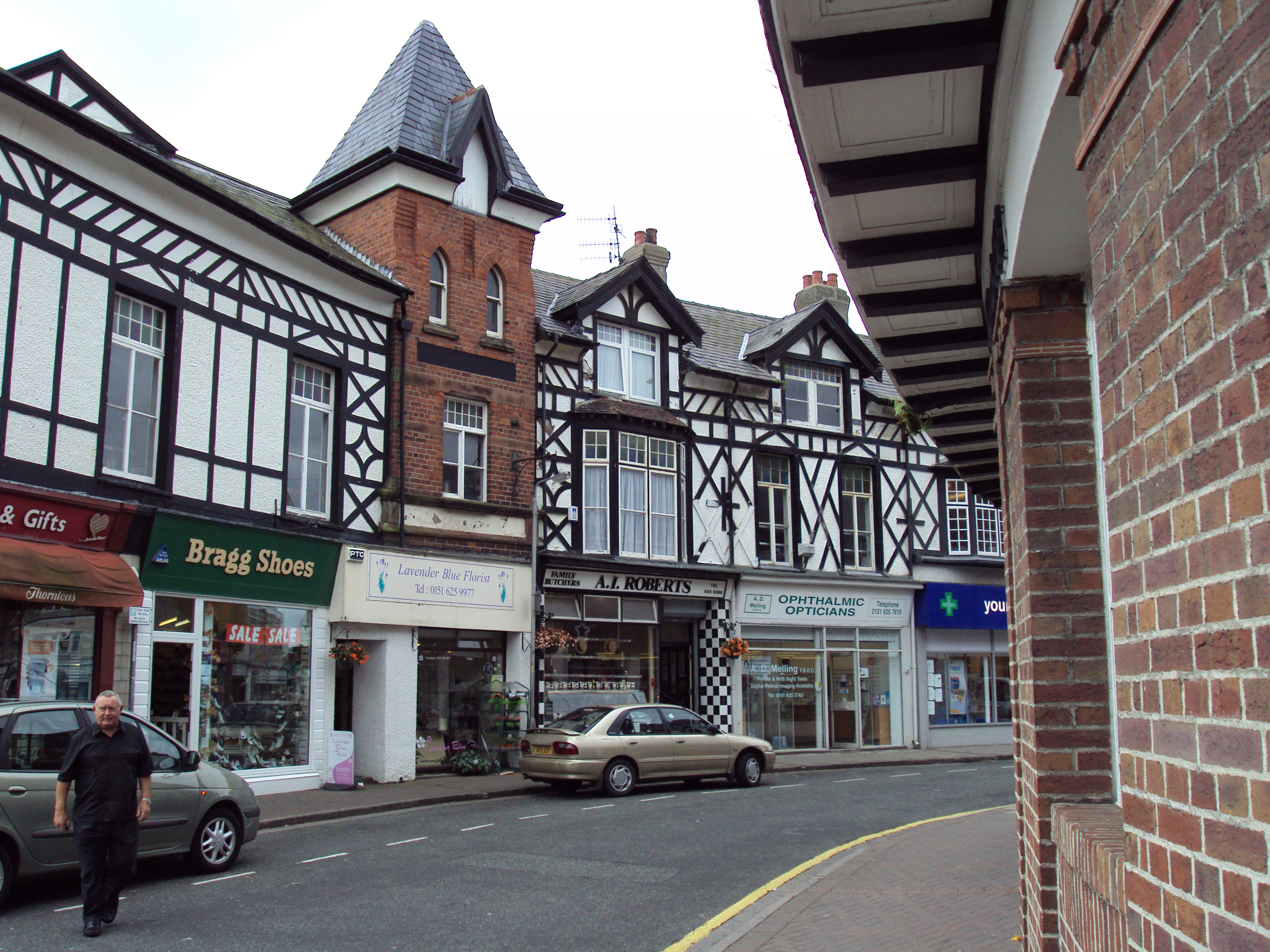
- Shops on The Crescent

- Location within Merseyside
- Population: 13,380 (Built up area, 2021)
- OS grid reference: SJ213869
  - London: 182 mi (293 km) SE
- Metropolitan borough: Wirral
- Metropolitan county: Merseyside
- Region: North West
- Country: England
- Sovereign state: United Kingdom
- Post town: WIRRAL
- Postcode district: CH48
- Dialling code: 0151
- ISO 3166 code: GB-WRL
- Police: Merseyside
- Fire: Merseyside
- Ambulance: North West
- UK Parliament: Wirral West

West Kirby (/wɛst ˈkɜːrbi/) is a coastal town in the Metropolitan Borough of Wirral, Merseyside, England. In the north west of the Wirral Peninsula and at the mouth of the River Dee, the town is contiguous with Hoylake. It lies within the historic county boundaries of Cheshire, and became part of Merseyside in 1974. The built up area had a population of 13,380 at the 2021 census.

== History ==
The name West Kirby is of Viking origin, originally Kirkjubyr, meaning 'village with a church'. The form with the modifier "West" exists to distinguish it from the other town of the same name in Wirral: Kirkby-in-Walea (now the modern town of Wallasey). The earliest usage given of this form is West Kyrkeby in Wirhale in 1285.

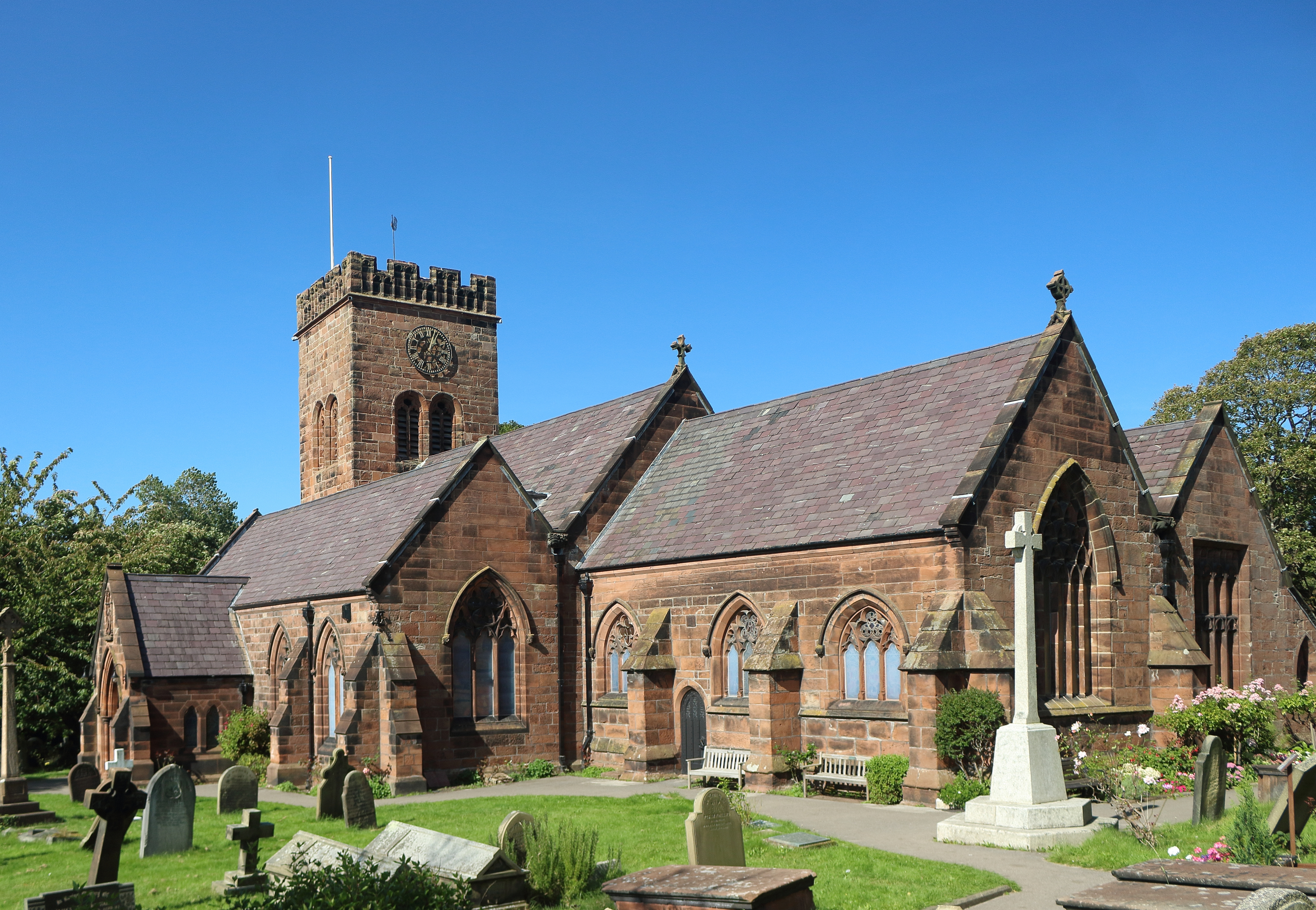
St Bridget's Church

The old village lay around St. Bridget's Church, but the town today is centred on West Kirby railway station, which is about 1 km away. The town has a Victorian promenade, flanked by the West Kirby Marine Lake that permits boats to sail even at low tide. The original wall was built to create the lake in 1899 but suffered a catastrophic leak in 1985. A new lake was constructed on the site which is wider than previously and allows better sporting opportunities. The Hoylake and West Kirby War Memorial is a notable local landmark, designed in 1922 by the British sculptor Charles Sargeant Jagger, who was responsible for a number of war memorials around the world, including the Royal Artillery Memorial at Hyde Park Corner in London.

== Governance ==
There is one main tier of local government covering West Kirby, at metropolitan borough level: Wirral Council. The council is a member of the Liverpool City Region Combined Authority, which is led by the directly-elected Mayor of the Liverpool City Region.

=== Administrative history ===
West Kirby was an ancient parish in the Wirral Hundred of Cheshire. It was subdivided into nine townships: Caldy, Frankby, Grange, Greasby, (Note: Except a small area of 61 acres (25 ha) of Greasby township that was in the parish of Thurstaston.) Hoose, Great Meols, Little Meols, Newton cum Larton, and a West Kirby township covering the area around the village itself.

From the 17th century onwards, parishes were gradually given various civil functions under the poor laws, in addition to their original ecclesiastical functions. In some cases, including West Kirby, the civil functions were exercised by each township separately rather than the parish as a whole. In 1866, the legal definition of 'parish' was changed to be the areas used for administering the poor laws, and so each of the townships also became a civil parish.

The population of the West Kirby township was 148 in 1801, 435 in 1851, and 2,441 in 1891.

A local government district was created in 1891, covering Great Meols, Hoose, Little Meols, West Kirby and part of Grange. There was a dispute about whether the district's name should be 'Hoylake and West Kirby' or 'West Kirby and Hoylake'; the county council chose the latter.

Such districts were reconstituted as urban districts under the Local Government Act 1894, at which point the civil parishes within the district were united into a single civil parish called Hoylake-cum-West Kirby. Although the order creating the district in 1891 had put the name West Kirby first, the council took to calling the district Hoylake and West Kirby. To resolve the ambiguity, the government formally confirmed the district's name as being Hoylake and West Kirby in 1897. The council chose to base itself in Hoylake, building Hoylake Town Hall there in 1898.

The urban district was enlarged in 1933 to take in the civil parishes of Caldy, Frankby, Grange, (Note: Grange was enlarged at the same time to take in the western parts of the abolished parish of Saughall Massie, not including the village.) and Greasby. The urban district then covered a very similar area to the ancient parish of West Kirby, but from its expansion the urban district was just called Hoylake. Hoylake Urban District was abolished in 1974 under the Local Government Act 1972. The area became part of the Metropolitan Borough of Wirral in the new county of Merseyside.

== Geography ==
West Kirby lies at the north-western corner of the Wirral Peninsula. West Kirby is on the eastern side of the mouth of the Dee Estuary, opposite North Wales and approximately 8 miles (13 km) west of Liverpool. Hilbre Island is approximately 1 mile (1.6 km) offshore from West Kirby, at the mouth of the Dee Estuary.

== Community ==
=== Schools ===
Secondary schools in the area are Calday Grange Grammar School on Caldy Hill, West Kirby Grammar School and Hilbre High School, which includes the WestWirralWorks City Learning Centre and West Kirby Residential School.

=== Churches ===
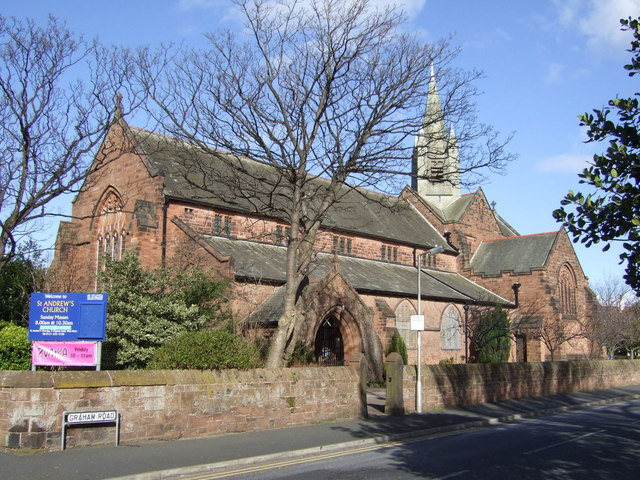
St Andrew's Church, at the junction of Graham Road and Meols Drive

St Bridget's Church is West Kirby's Church of England parish church, and the chancel of the present church dates from around 1320. St Andrew's Church is West Kirby's second Church of England church, originally built as a chapel of ease for St Bridget's, gaining its own parish in 1920.

St Agnes' Church is the local Roman Catholic church. West Kirby also has a United Reformed church, which dates to 1890, and a Methodist church dating from 1904.

=== Leisure ===
West Kirby Library is within West Kirby Concourse, and operated by the Metropolitan Borough of Wirral. The West Kirby Museum, founded in 1892, is adjacent to St Bridget's Church.

==== Parks, gardens and beach ====
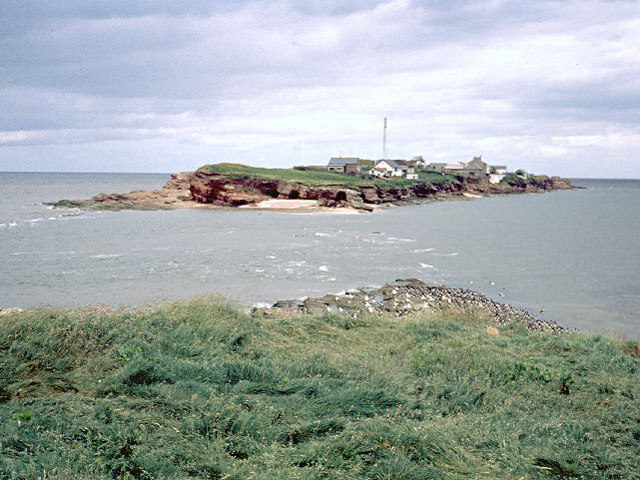
Hilbre Island, approximately 1 mi (1.6 km) offshore from West Kirby

The town itself contains Ashton Park and a starting point of the Wirral Way, which follows the trackbed of the former Birkenhead Railway branch line from Hooton. Sandlea Park lies in the centre of the town, a short walk from the railway station. Coronation Gardens is located between the southern end of the promenade between South Parade and Banks Road. There are various other small parks and bowling greens around the town. Another popular activity is to walk out to the islands of Little Eye, Middle Eye and Hilbre Island at low tide. The promenade, beach and the walk to the war memorial allow an excellent panoramic view of part of the North Wales coastline.

=== Sport ===
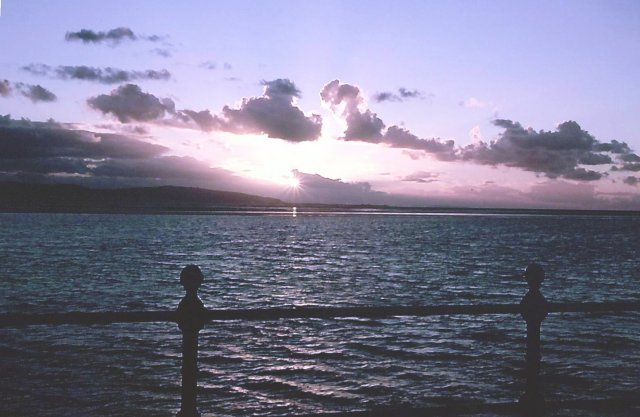
Sunset over the Marine Lake

Sailboarding, sailing and kayaking are all popular local sports. In October 1991 the World Windsurfing Production Speed Record was set by Dave White on the West Kirby Marine Lake at 42.16 knots.

Water sports fans are warned to wear appropriate footwear while using the marine lake because of the presence of weaver fish with sharp poisonous barbs. There is also an RNLI Lifeboat Station near West Kirby Sailing Club.

The Royal Liverpool Golf Club, a links course between West Kirby and Hoylake, has hosted 11 British Open Golf championships in the past 121 years, most recently the 2006 and 2014 British Opens.

Tennis tournaments have been held in Ashton Park. Here, players including John McEnroe, Boris Becker, Monica Seles and Pete Sampras have played in competition.

West Kirby FC is the town's senior football club, which plays in the West Cheshire League and plays its matches at Marine Park, Greenbank Road. West Kirby Ladies FC was officially established in 2017 and also play their matches at Marine Park, as do West Kirby Ladies U18s who play in the Cheshire Women's and Youth League. The town has one of the largest junior football clubs in the North West, with over 90 teams and 1,000 players at West Kirby United. The teams play at many venues across West Kirby, including Calday Grange Grammar School, Hilbre High School and Greenbank Road. There were initially two junior clubs in the town, West Kirby Panthers and West Kirby Wasps, until the two sections merged to create West Kirby United in July 2017. The junior clubs play in the Eastham League with a youth section who play as West Kirby United in the North West under-21 League.

West Kirby is also home to Hoylake Amateur Swimming Club who train at West Kirby Concourse.

==== Marine Lake ====
The Marine Lake is a large man-made coastal lake. The structure is large enough to hold sailing events, such as the Wilson Trophy, sailboarding and water-related activities including canoeing, kayaking and power-boating. In 2009, it was reported that the lake had undergone structural damage, most likely due to estuarine erosion. Since this report a £750K refurbishment has taken place to help restore the lake, and it is now back to holding water-sport activities.

== Media ==
Local news and television programmes are provided by BBC North West and ITV Granada; the local television station Liverpool TV also broadcasts to the area. Television signals are received from the Winter Hill TV transmitter. With its close proximity with North Wales, BBC Wales and ITV Cymru Wales can also be received from the Moel-y-Parc TV transmitter.

Local radio stations are BBC Radio Merseyside, Heart North West, Capital North West & Wales, Hits Radio Liverpool, Smooth North West, Greatest Hits Radio Liverpool & The North West, Radio Wirral, and Wirral Wave Radio, a community-based station.

The area's local newspapers are the Wirral Globe, and Liverpool Echo.

== Transport ==
=== Railway ===
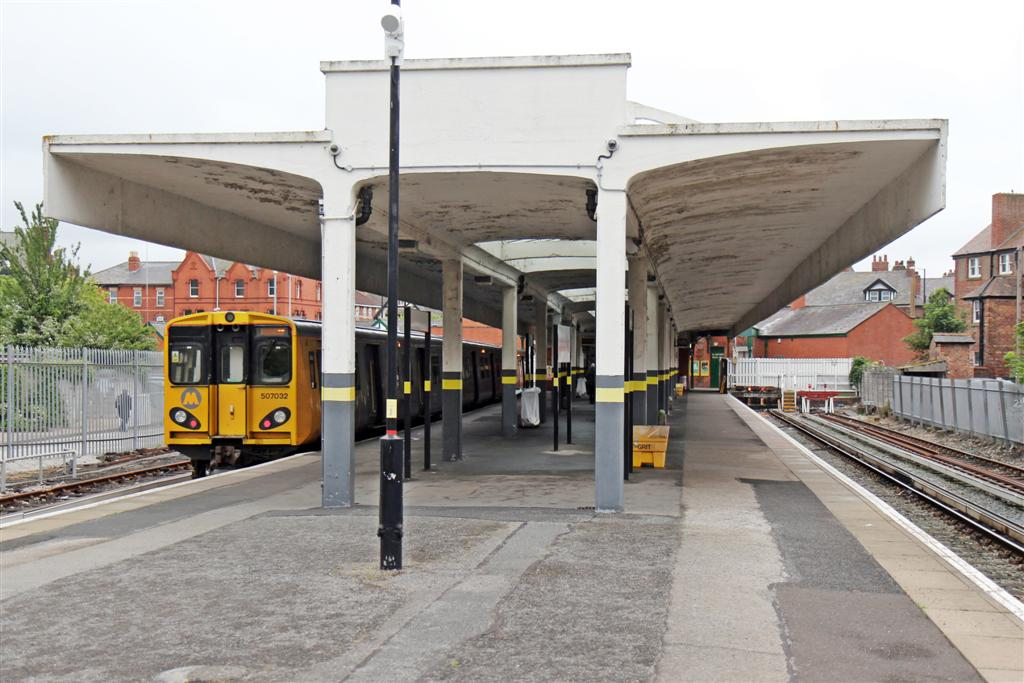
West Kirby station

West Kirby railway station is the western terminus of Merseyrail's Wirral line. It facilitates return services to Birkenhead Hamilton Square and Liverpool Central; a change at Bidston provides a connection to Wrexham and North Wales.

=== Roads ===
Grange Road, the main thoroughfare of West Kirby, is part of the A540 road. The B5141, starting at the Dee Lane junction with Grange Road, joins West Kirby with Caldy via Banks Road, Sandy Lane and Caldy Road.

=== Buses ===
The town is well served by bus routes. There are frequent connections to Birkenhead and Liverpool, provided by Arriva North West that run every 10–20 minutes. Stagecoach Merseyside also serve the town with connections along the coast on service 38. There is also a direct bus service between West Kirby to Chester, via Heswall and Neston, that runs hourly from Monday to Saturday.

== Notable people ==
- Frederick Aspinall, first-class cricketer
- Andrew Baddeley, English middle distance runner (1500 m), brought up in West Kirby and attended Calday Grange Grammar School.
- Rafa Benitez, former Everton F.C. and Liverpool F.C. manager, lives in West Kirby.
- Margaret Brownlow, a herb farmer and garden designer was born here in 1916.
- Paul Clark, co-artistic director of performance company Clod Ensemble, was born in West Kirby.
- Cyril Clarke (1907–2000), medical geneticist, died in West Kirby.
- Daniel Craig, James Bond actor, attended Hilbre High School and Calday Grange Grammar School in West Kirby.
- Cyril Edward Gourley, recipient of the Victoria Cross, was a pupil at Calday Grange Grammar School and is buried in Grange Cemetery.
- Esther McVey, British Conservative politician
- Shirley Hughes, writer and illustrator, was brought up in West Kirby.
- Pete Price, broadcaster, comedian and author is a presenter on Radio City.
- Glenda Jackson, actress and politician, attended West Kirby Grammar School.
- Selwyn Lloyd, former Chancellor of the Exchequer, Foreign Secretary and Speaker of the House of Commons, lived in West Kirby.
- George Mallory, mountaineer, was schooled in West Kirby.
- Denys Rayner, recipient of the Distinguished Service Cross, was brought up in West Kirby.
- Bill Ryder-Jones, co-founded The Coral in West Kirby.
- Joanna Scanlan, actress and television writer, born in the town
- David Sheppard, cricketer and Bishop of Liverpool, retired to West Kirby.
- Philip Sheppard and Sir Cyril Clarke, lepidopterists, worked in West Kirby.
- Olaf Stapledon, science fiction author and philosopher, was a former resident.

== See also ==
- Listed buildings in Hoylake
- Kirby Park railway station
