= Meols =

Suburb of Wirral in Merseyside, England

Coordinates: 53.4014°N 3.1553°W

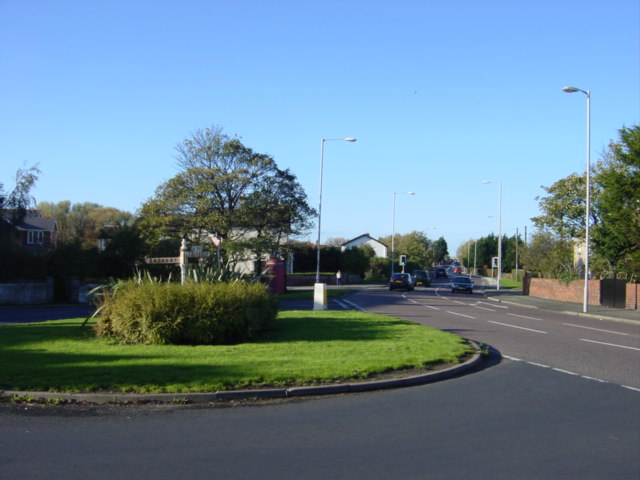
- The A553 junction with Heron Road in 2005

- Location within Merseyside
- Population: 5,110 (2001 census)
- OS grid reference: SJ232900
  - London: 183 mi (295 km) SE
- Metropolitan borough: Metropolitan Borough of Wirral
- Metropolitan county: Merseyside
- Region: North West
- Country: England
- Sovereign state: United Kingdom
- Post town: WIRRAL
- Postcode district: CH47
- Dialling code: 0151
- ISO 3166 code: GB-WRL
- Police: Merseyside
- Fire: Merseyside
- Ambulance: North West
- UK Parliament: Wirral West

Meols (/ˈmɛlz/ MELZ), sometimes known as Great Meols, is a suburb in the Metropolitan Borough of Wirral, Merseyside, England. On the north coast of the Wirral Peninsula, it forms a contiguous built up area with the nearby town of Hoylake which lies to the west. Historically in Cheshire, since 1 April 1974 it has been part of the Metropolitan Borough of Wirral.

The 2001 census recorded the population of Meols as 5,110. In the 2011 census specific population figures for Meols were not available. The total population of the Hoylake and Meols local government ward was 13,348.

== History ==
Meols was named as such by the Vikings; its original name from the Old Norse for 'sand dunes' was melr, becoming melas by the time of the Domesday Book of 1086.

Impressive archaeological finds dating back to the Neolithic period suggest that the site was an important centre in antiquity. Since about 1810, a large number of artefacts have been found relating to pre-Roman Carthage, the Iron Age, the Roman Empire, Armenia, the Anglo-Saxons and the Vikings. These include items as varied as coins which belonged to the Coriosolites in Brittany. Also, tokens, brooches, pins, knives, glass beads, keys, pottery, flint tools, mounts, pilgrim badges, pieces of leather, worked wood and iron tools. They came to be discovered after the beginning of large-scale dredging (to accommodate the needs of the nearby growing seaport of Liverpool) started to cause notable sand erosion along the coastline near Meols. These finds suggest that the site was used as a port as far back as the Iron Age some 2,400 years ago, and was once the most important seaport in the present-day North West England. Thus trading connections are believed to have reached far across Europe. Some of these artefacts are on display locally, at the Museum of Liverpool. In the 1890s the local authorities built the first sea wall. The rapidly eroding coastline was saved, but the sea wall changed the currents and archaeological sites at Meols were buried in the sand. The remains of a submerged forest off Dove Point have now also disappeared but they were visible until the spring of 1982.

In 1938, what was believed to be a Viking (Nordic clinker) boat was discovered beneath 2–3 m (6–10 feet) of clay when the 'Railway Inn' public house was being rebuilt. Workers at the time covered the ship over again so as not to delay the construction of the pub's new car park. The pub landlord mentioned its previous discovery to local police constable Tim Baldock, who contacted Professor Stephen Harding of the University of Nottingham. Ground penetrating radar (GPR) equipment was used to confirm existence of the boat and precise location on 10 September 2007. Further archaeological work was undertaken in February 2023, by a team from Wirral Archaeology CIC, supervised by a professional archaeologist and Professor Harding. Cores of soil were drilled and samples taken away for analysis. By using Carbon14 dating, dendrochronology and wood assessment, the group aim to discover the age of the boat and where the wood it was constructed from was felled.

Meols was formerly called Great Meols. It was a township in West Kirby parish of the Wirral Hundred before becoming a civil parish from 1866. On 31 December 1894 it was abolished to create the Hoylake and West Kirby civil parish. Great Meols had a population of 140 in 1801, 170 in 1851 and 821 in 1901. Between 1894 and 1974 it was within Hoylake Urban District. On 1 April 1974, local government reorganisation in England and Wales resulted in most of the Wirral Peninsula, including Meols, transfer from the county of Cheshire to the newly created county of Merseyside.

The historic name of Great Meols survives in the name of the primary school and the Anglican church. It was still in more general use up to the 1960s, for instance in postal addresses and on the destination indicators of buses from Chester. There also used to be a village called Little Meols, on Meols Drive between Hoylake and West Kirby The name Little Meols fell out of use in Victorian times, having been absorbed by Hoylake. From 123 inhabitants in 1801 and 170 in 1851, by 1901 at 2,850, its population had outstripped Great Meols.

Meols was known to be spelt as Meolse up until when the railway station was placed. The error came about at the time of the station's construction, when rail managers took the spelling of Meols from the Southport suburb of Meols Cop and used it for new signage.

== Geography ==
Meols is at the north-western corner of the Wirral Peninsula, adjacent to the Irish Sea.

== Governance ==
Meols is within the parliamentary constituency of Wirral West. The current Member of Parliament is Matthew Patrick, a Labour representative.

At local government level, the area is incorporated into the Hoylake and Meols Ward of the Metropolitan Borough of Wirral, in the metropolitan county of Merseyside. It is represented on Wirral Metropolitan Borough Council by three councillors. The most recent local elections took place on 6 May 2021.

== Community ==
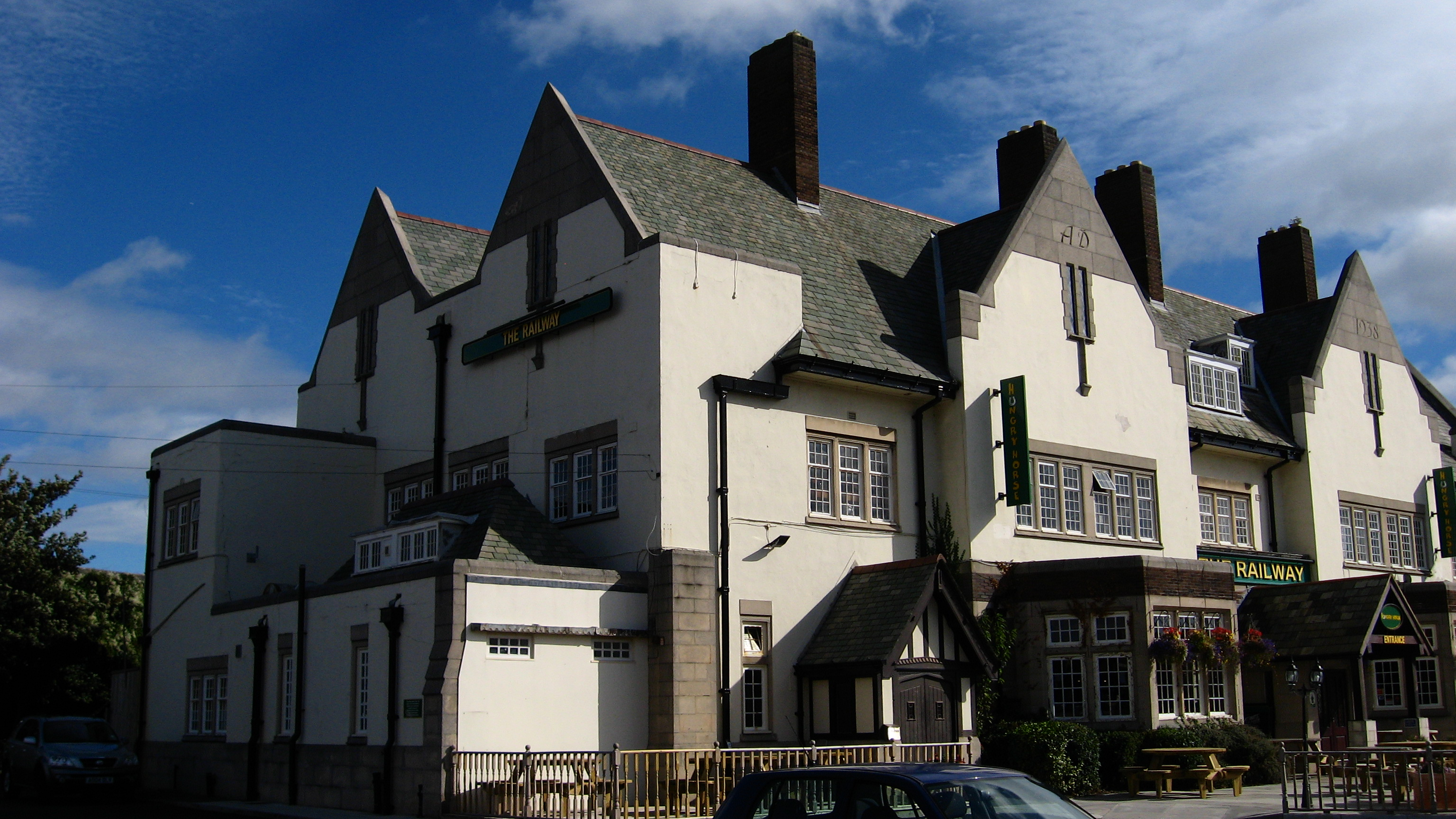
The Railway Inn is believed to have a Viking clinker boat buried under its car park

Meols is mainly residential with a small yacht and fishing community on its Irish Sea shore line. The centre has a small row of shops adjacent to Meols railway station, the 'Railway Inn' public house and a primary school. The North Wirral Coastal Park stretches from Dove Point in Meols to New Brighton. There is also a local community park known as Meols Park and Recreation Ground and a bowling green. The Friends of Meols Park are a community group set up in 2007 to help maintain and improve the recreation ground.

== Transport ==
The area is served by Meols railway station on the West Kirby branch of Merseyrail's Wirral line.

=== Bus ===
| Number | Route | Operator | Days of Operation |
|---|---|---|---|
| 38/38A | Heswall/West Kirby-Bromborough | Stagecoach Merseyside & South Lancashire | Every Day |
| 407 | Liverpool-West Kirby | Arriva North West | Monday-Saturday |

A number of school services also serve Meols.

== Notable people and cultural references ==
Cyclist Chris Boardman, winner of a gold medal for Great Britain at the 1992 Summer Olympics, lived in Meols before moving to nearby Hoylake.

Miles Kane, former member of the Little Flames, the Rascals, one half of the Last Shadow Puppets with the Arctic Monkeys frontman Alex Turner and now a successful solo artist, is from Meols.

Andy McCluskey, the co-founder, singer and bassist of the electronic band Orchestral Manoeuvres in the Dark (OMD) is also from Meols. OMD had a track called "Red Frame/White Light" from their eponymous debut studio album which referred to the public telephone box between the church and the Railway Inn on Greenwood Road, Meols. Hidden within the lyrics was the telephone number of the telephone box (632-3003). It is claimed that fans would call that telephone number from all over the world. The telephone box was removed by BT in August 2017 but was returned by October after a campaign by fans of the duo, and now displays a commemorative plaque noting its significance.

The television sitcom Watching, produced by Granada Television between 1987 and 1993, utilised Meols as a filming location. This was likely because the characters Malcolm and Mrs Stoneway lived in the village.

== See also ==
- Listed buildings in Hoylake

== Bibliography ==
- Mortimer, William Williams (1847). The History of the Hundred of Wirral. London: Whittaker & Co. pp275-276.
- Griffiths, David; Philpott, Robert A.; Egan, Geoff (2007). Meols: the archaeology of the North Wirral coast discoveries and observations in the 19th and 20th centuries, with a catalogue of collections (PDF). Oxford University School of Archaeology Monograph Series. Vol. 68. Oxford. ISBN 978-1905905034.
