= Ashton Park, Merseyside =

Public park in West Kirby, England

Ashton Park
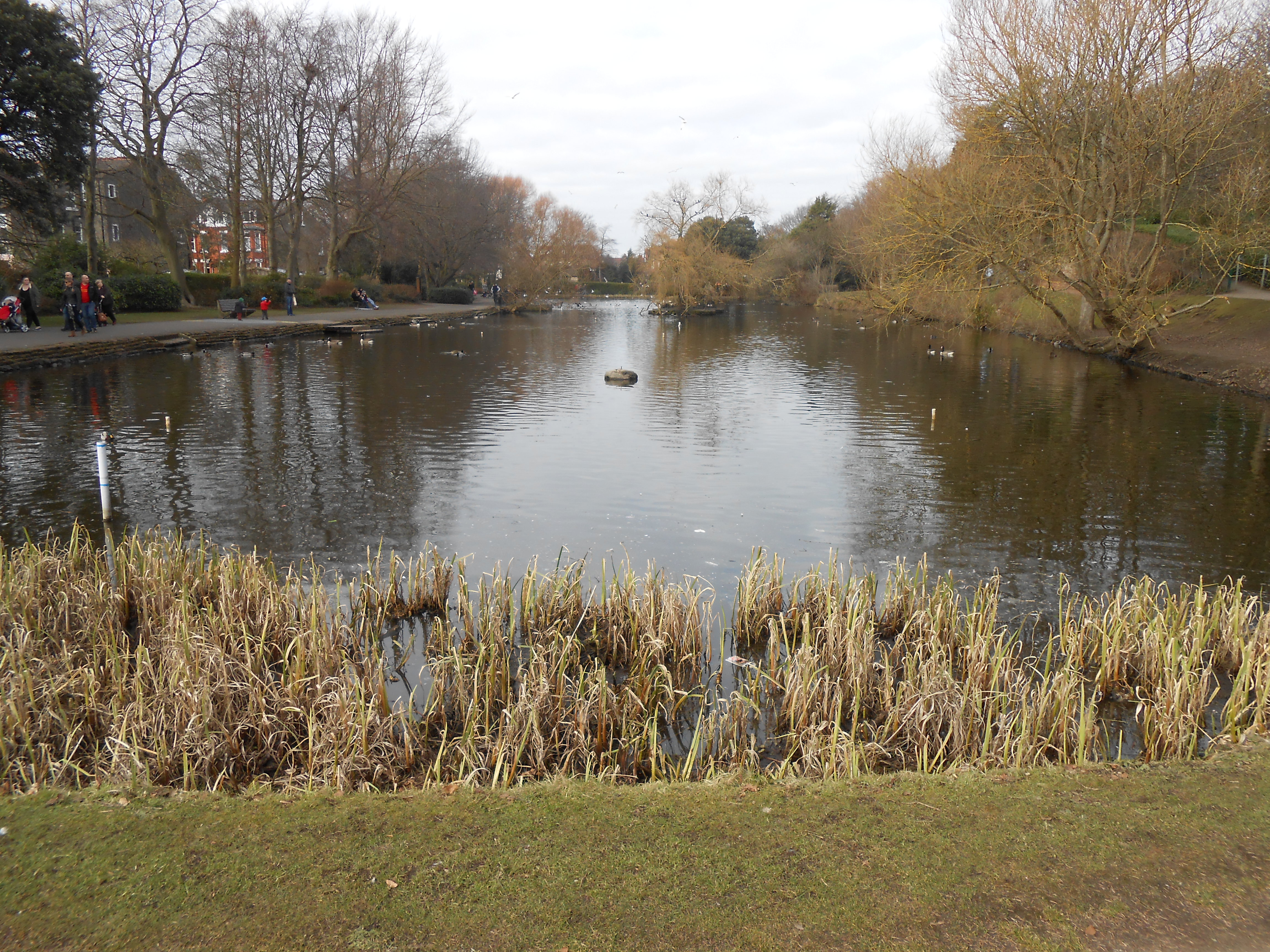
- Ashton Park
- Interactive map of Ashton Park
- Type: Public park
- Location: West Kirby, Merseyside
- Coordinates: 53.3709°N 3.1811°W
- Created: 1899
- Operator: Metropolitan Borough of Wirral
- Open: All year
- Status: Open

Ashton Park is located in West Kirby, Wirral. The park is bisected by the Wirral Way forming an upper and lower park. Facilities at the park include a lake, playground and café with toilets in the lower park and tennis courts, a basketball court and a football pitch in the upper park. There are also two crown bowling greens; the Upper Park Green is used by West Kirby Ladies Bowling Club and the Lower Park Green is used by West Kirby Victoria Bowling Club. The south end of the lake is used by Wirral Model Boat Club. Each year a May day fair is held and in the summer local bands play in the Upper Park Arena.
