= North Wirral Coastal Park =

Coastal park on the Wirral Peninsula, Merseyside, England

North Wirral Foreshore
- Site of Special Scientific Interest
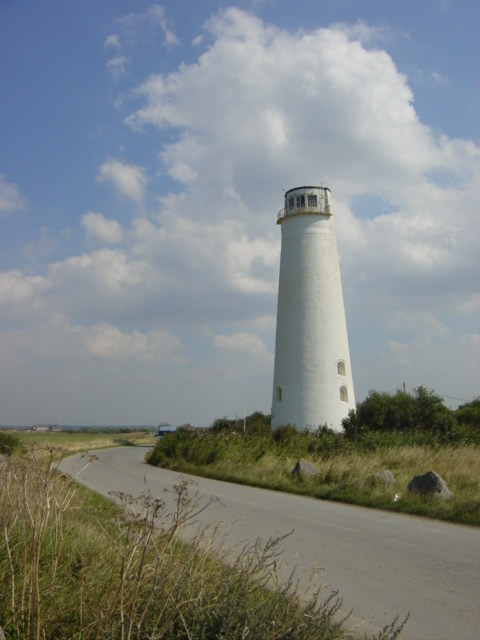

- Location within Merseyside
- Location of North Wirral Foreshore.
- Area of search: Merseyside
- Grid reference: SJ250920
- Coordinates: 53.419°N 3.118°W
- Interest: Biological
- Area: 2,109.9 ha (5,214 acres)
- Notification date: 1979 / 1983

Designations

Ramsar Wetland
- Official name: The Mersey Narrows and North Wirral Foreshore
- Designated: 7 May 2013
- Reference no.: 2202

The North Wirral Coastal Park, on the Wirral Peninsula in England, is a coastal park including public open space, common land, natural foreshore and sand-dunes. Created in 1986, it lies between Dove Point in Meols and the Kings Parade in New Brighton.

== Description ==
The park is managed by the Metropolitan Borough of Wirral ranger service, from their offices in the Leasowe Lighthouse. It occupies some 200 acres (81 ha) of land in a four-mile stretch along the coastline, making it Wirral's largest park.

Although the park in its current form is relatively new, the history of the site goes back at least 5,000 years to when the area, including the foreshore, was heavily forested. The remains of this coastal forestland are known as the submerged forest and can be seen at Dove Point, Meols, between the slipway and the groyne.

== Leisure pursuits ==
=== Wildlife ===
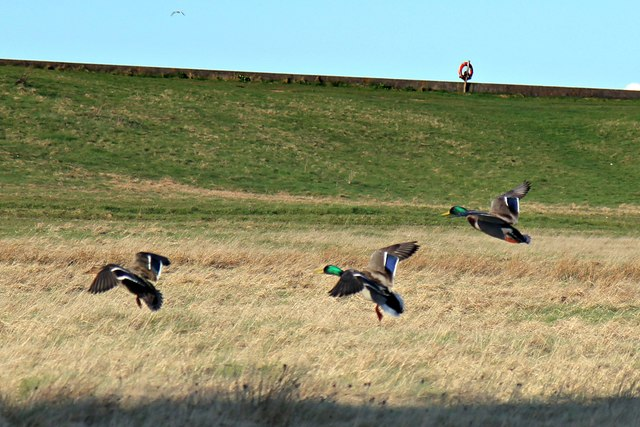
Mallard ducks at Leasowe Common

The park, which has been granted Site of Special Scientific Interest (SSSI) status, is one of the country's premier sites for wading bird populations. Among the species which can be found in the area are: Eurasian oystercatcher, common redshank, dunlin, sanderling, ruddy turnstone, northern lapwing, bar-tailed godwit and Eurasian curlew.

The large population of fish, worms and crustaceans in the foreshore region sustains the bird wildlife; species include: shore crabs, shrimps, prawns, lugworm, ragworm, cockles, tellin, peppery furrow shell, gobies, blennies, sole, plaice, flounder, dab and pipefish.

=== Sport ===
The park is a popular site for sailing, angling, swimming, cycling, walking, jogging, ball games and horse riding.
