= Caldy Hill =

Hill in England

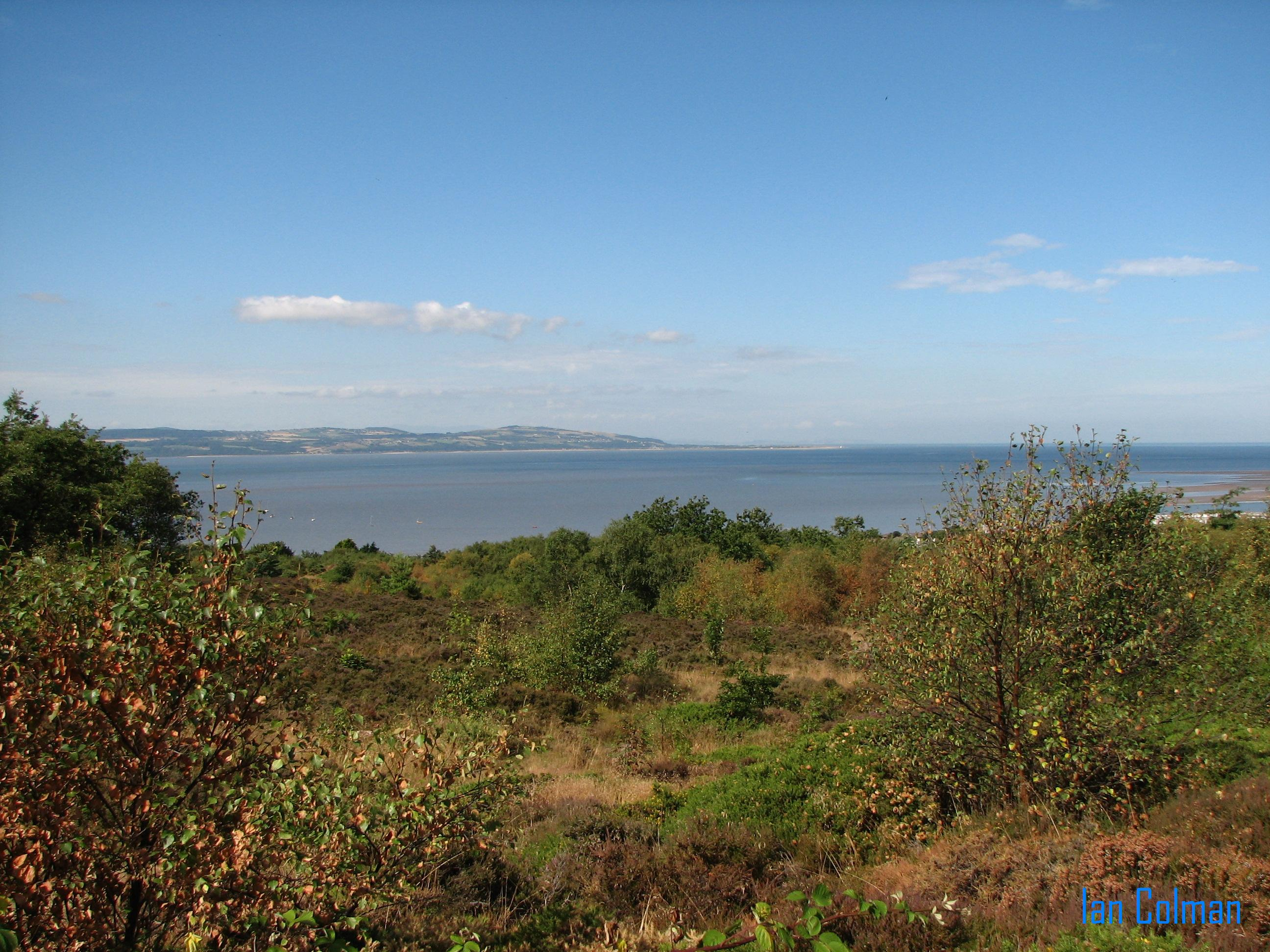
- View from Caldy Hill to Wales over the River Dee
- Interactive map of Caldy Hill
- Type: Common
- Location: Caldy, Merseyside
- Coordinates: 53.3667°N 3.1668°W
- Area: 250 acres (1.0 km^{2})
- Created: 1897
- Operator: Metropolitan Borough of Wirral
- Open: All year
- Status: Open

Caldy Hill is an area of heath and woodland on a sandstone outcrop on the Wirral Peninsula in North West England. The land was bought by Hoylake District Council between 1897 and 1974. The village of Caldy is nearby.

Including Stapledon Woods, the whole area covers 250 acres (1.0 km^{2}) of which 13 acres (53,000 m^{2}) are owned by the National Trust. The hill rises to 260 ft where there is a view-finder, a memorial to Sir Alfred Vaughan Paton. From here there are fine views over the estuary of the River Dee to Hilbre Island and the Irish Sea. More distant views range to Snowdonia in the west and Blackpool and the Pennines in the east, more rarely as far as the Lake District to the north, and extremely rarely to the Isle of Man in the north-west.

Originally, the hill was all privately owned by local landowners, but parts were then given or sold to Hoylake District Council with the understanding that the land was to be made open to the public and managed as countryside.

The Mariners' Beacon stands nearby on the site of an old windmill, which was missed by mariners after it was destroyed by a gale in 1839. Consequently, the Trustees of the Liverpool Docks erected the Mariners' Beacon in 1841.

Calday Grange Grammar School is situated on Caldy Hill.
