= Liverpool Built-up Area =

Human settlement in United Kingdom

Coordinates: 53.409°N 2.934°W

2011 Built-up Area showing subdivisions

The Liverpool Built-up Area (previously Liverpool Urban Area in 2001 and prior) is a term used by the Office for National Statistics (ONS) to denote the urban area around Liverpool in England, to the east of the River Mersey. The contiguous built-up area extends beyond the area administered by Liverpool City Council into adjoining local authority areas, particularly parts of Sefton and Knowsley. As defined by ONS, the area extends as far east as St Helens, Haydock, and Ashton-in-Makerfield in Greater Manchester.

The Liverpool Urban Area is not the same area as Merseyside (or the Liverpool City Region sometimes informally referred to as Greater Merseyside), which includes areas of Wirral on the west bank of the Mersey and Southport. The western extent of the Greater Manchester conurbation is narrowly avoided as that extends as far as Golborne and Newton-le-Willows, with small gaps separating those towns from Ashton-In-Makerfield and Haydock.

== Settlements ==
The Liverpool Urban Area defined by ONS covers Liverpool and its contiguous built-up areas, with a population of 864,122 a considerable increase from the 2001 census due to the rapid growth in the population of Liverpool during this period. The population of the area was 816,216 in the 2001 census,. The urban area facing Liverpool on the Wirral Peninsula is a separate division known as the Birkenhead Urban Area.

The ONS definition is based purely on physical criteria with a focus on the presence or absence of significant gaps between built-up areas. It therefore extends as far as Ashton-in-Makerfield, but excludes some areas much closer to Liverpool which are separated from it by open spaces, notably Kirkby with a narrow gap along the M57 motorway, and Maghull.

Subdivisions are not always aligned to present administrative or county borders. For example, Liverpool as designated by the ONS also containing the towns Huyton, Roby, and Halewood which are all within the neighbouring borough of Knowsley. St Helens only covers the settlement, and not the St Helens borough which contains Rainford and Haydock.

According to the ONS, the subcomponents of the Liverpool Urban Area are:

Urban subvision	Population (2011)	Population (2001)	Population (1991)	Population (1981)
Liverpool	552,267	469,017	481,786	538,809
St Helens	102,885	102,629	106,293	-
Bootle	51,394	59,123	65,454	70,860
Huyton-with-Roby	-	54,766	56,500	62,011
Crosby	50,044	51,789	52,869	54,103
Prescot	37,911	39,695	37,486	-
Ashton-in-Makerfield	28,762	-	-	-
Litherland	18,507	22,242	20,905	21,989
Haydock	16,521	16,955	16,705	-
Rainford	5,831	-	-	-
Total	864,122	816,216	837,998	747,772

Notes:

- Huyton-with-Roby was included as part of the Liverpool subdivision in the 2011 census.
- Rainford and Ashton-in-Makerfield were not part of the Liverpool Urban Area prior to 2011.

== Greater Liverpool ==
Greater Liverpool is an informal term used by the Rent Service as one of its Broad Rental Market Areas (BRMA). This area includes such districts outside the Liverpool City Council boundaries as Crosby, Maghull, Prescot and St Helens.

Merseytravel include a similar Greater Liverpool area for its Public Transport Map and Guide as seen on its Liverpool area map.
