= Listed buildings in Tarbock =

Tarbock is a village in Knowsley, Merseyside, England. It contains two buildings that are recorded in the National Heritage List for England as designated listed buildings, both of which are listed at Grade II. This grade is the lowest of the three gradings given to listed buildings and is applied to "buildings of national importance and special interest".

Name and location	Photograph	Date	Notes
Rose Cottage; 53.38137°N 2.81523°W		17th century (probable)	A brick cottage with a thatched roof in a single storey with three gabled dormers. The windows are horizontally-sliding sashes. The cottage has a small added timber porch. Inside the cottage are cruck blades.
Tarbock Hall Farmhouse; 53.38776°N 2.81194°W		18th century	The farmhouse stands on a moated site. It is in brick, partly on a stone base, with a long plan, and is in two storeys. The windows are casements.
