= Halewood railway station =

Railway station in Halewood, Merseyside, England

Halewood
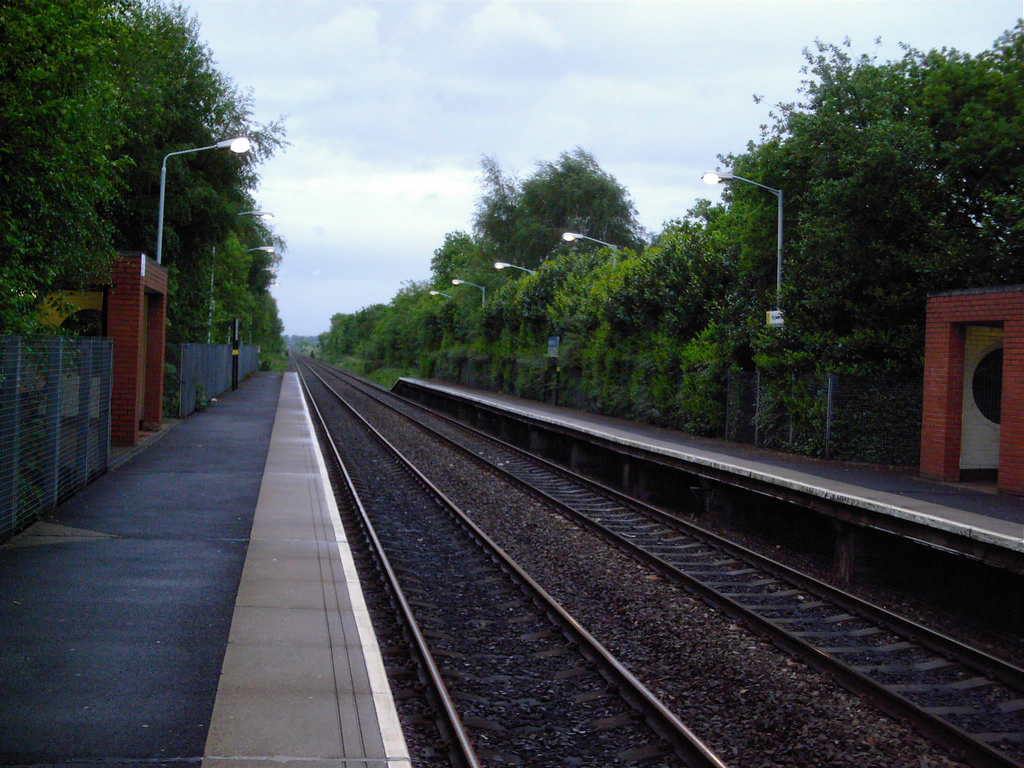

General information
- Location: Halewood, Knowsley; England
- Coordinates: 53.3645°N 2.8299°W
- Grid reference: SJ448856
- Managed by: Northern Trains
- Transit authority: Merseytravel
- Platforms: 2

Other information
- Station code: HED
- Fare zone: C2
- Classification: DfT category E

Key dates
- 1988: Opened

Passengers
- 2020/21: ▼18,400
- 2021/22: ▲55,050
- 2022/23: ▲64,202
- 2023/24: ▼59,114
- 2024/25: ▼58,030
Location
Notes
- Passenger statistics from the Office of Rail and Road

Halewood railway station is in Halewood, Merseyside, England. The station is operated by Merseytravel and is exclusively served by Northern Trains.

== History ==
Halewood station is modern, having been opened in May 1988, built at a cost of £440,000.

A station, closed in 1952, formerly existing a short distance to the east.

== Facilities ==
There is a ticket office at street level, with inclined ramps leading to the platforms; these both have brick shelters. It is staffed throughout hours of service (like other Merseytravel stations).

== Services ==
Services are roughly hourly in each direction (including Sundays), towards Hunts Cross and Liverpool Lime Street to the west and towards Hough Green and Warrington Central in the east. On Sundays, the service is hourly and extended through eastbound to Manchester Oxford Road.

== Gallery ==
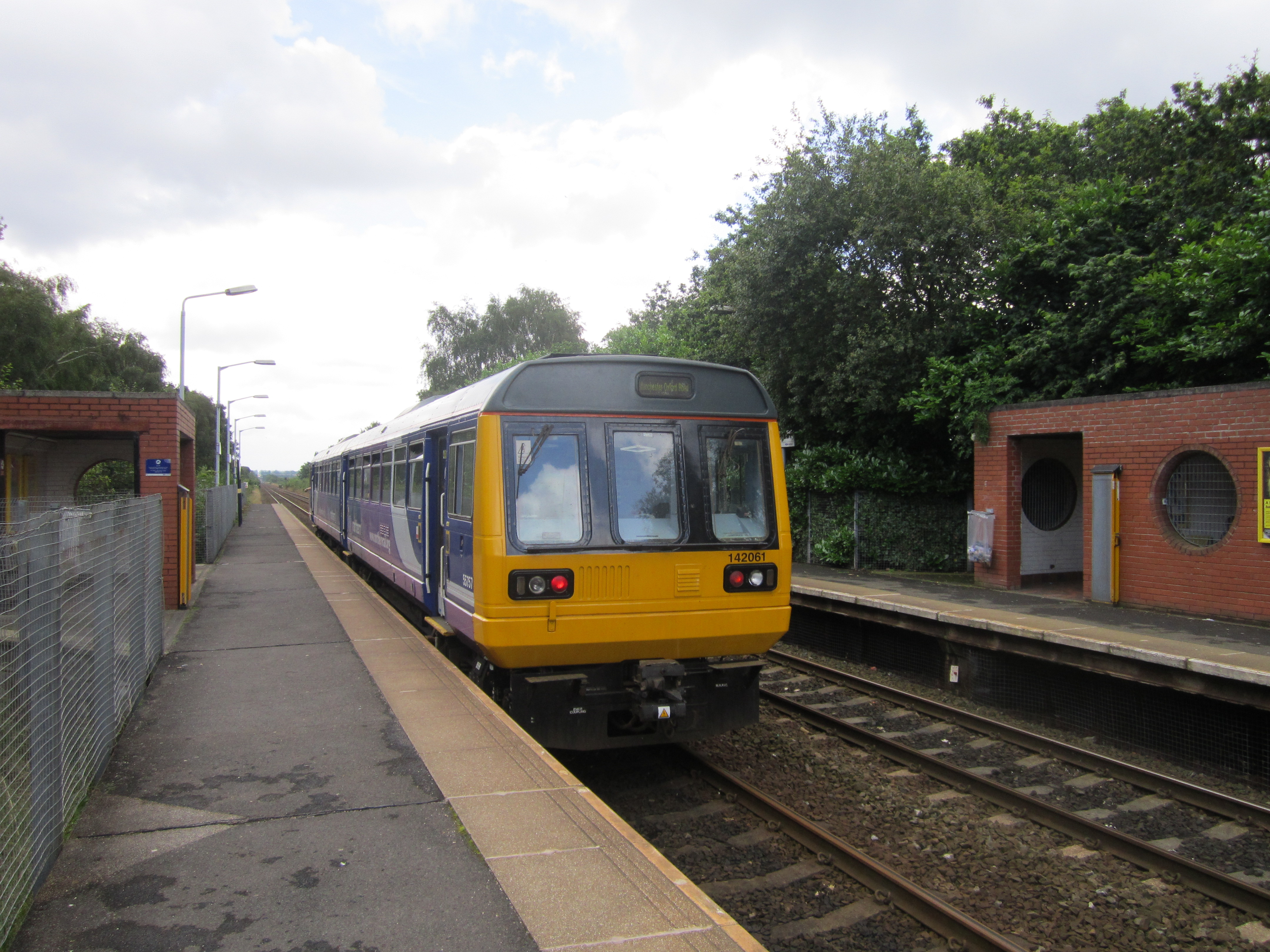
A Northern Rail Class 142 at the station.

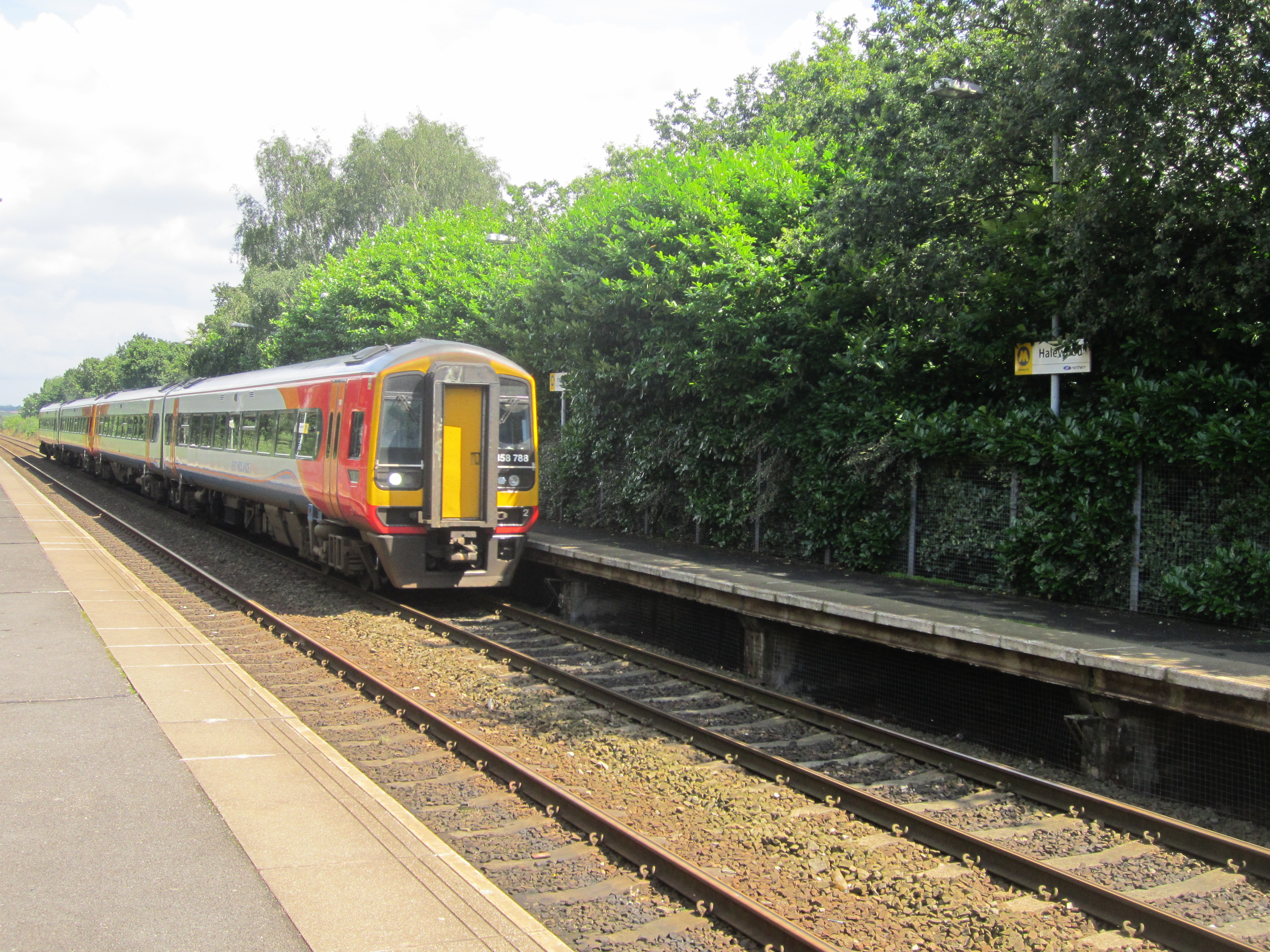
An EMT Class 158 heading towards Liverpool.

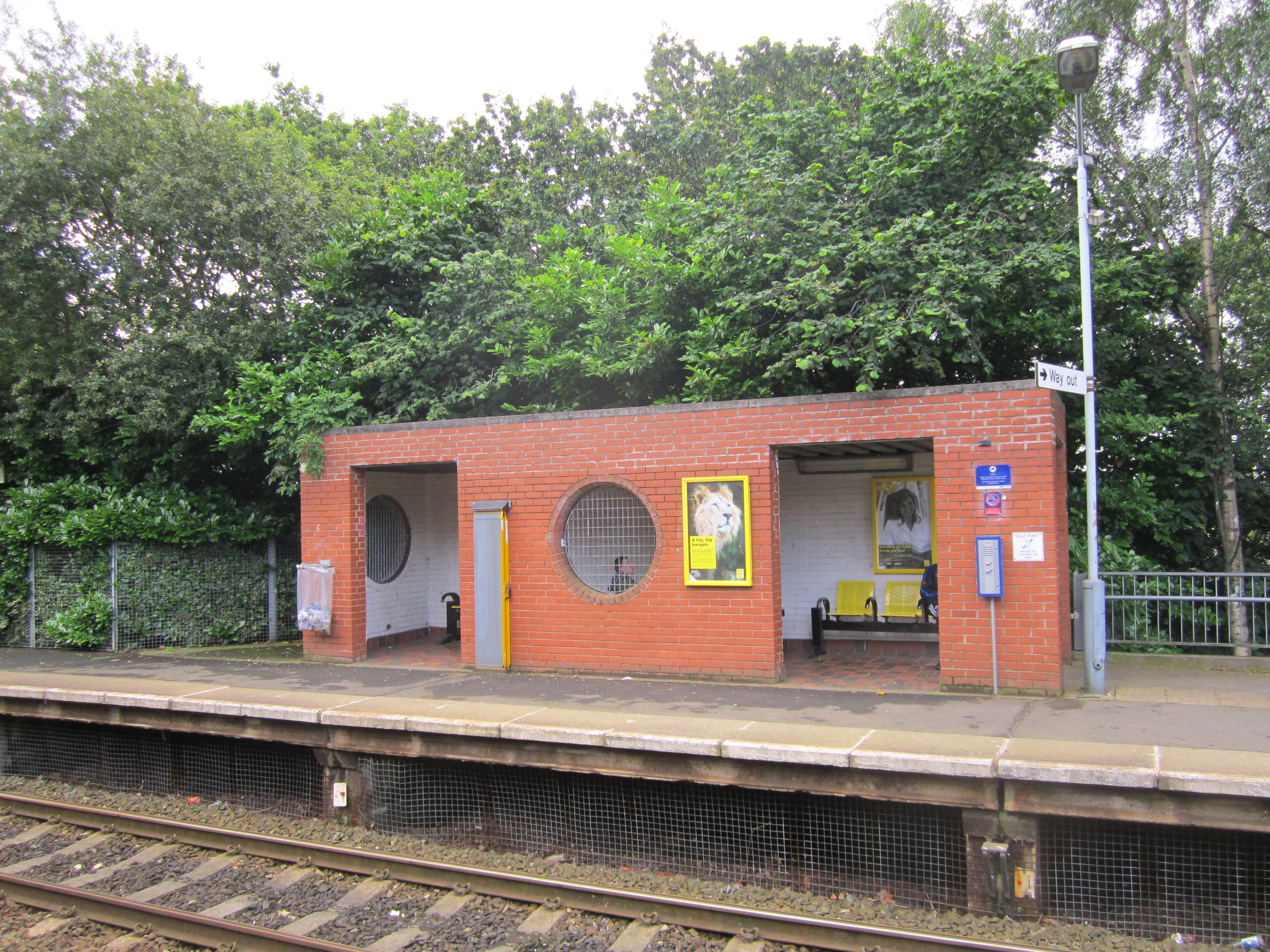
One of the station's waiting shelters.

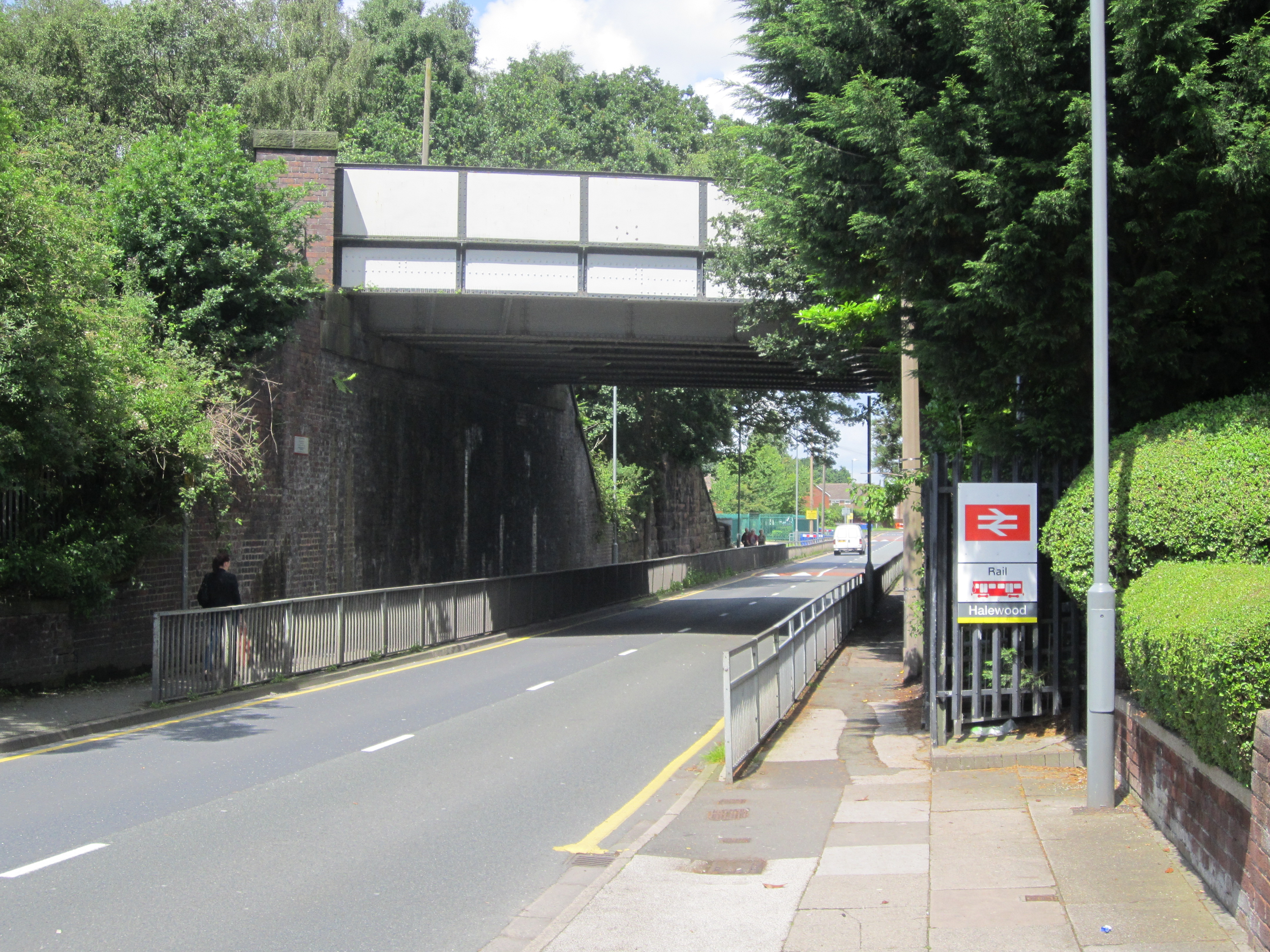
The station entrance, viewed from the street.

| Preceding station | National Rail | Following station |
|---|---|---|
| Hunts Cross | Northern Trains; Manchester to Liverpool Line (Cheshire Lines) Southern Route | Hough Green |
| | Disused railways | |
| Terminus | Cheshire Lines Committee; North Liverpool Extension Line | Gateacre |
