= Listed buildings in Halewood =

Halewood is a town in Knowsley, Merseyside, England. It contains four buildings that are recorded in the National Heritage List for England as designated listed buildings, all of which are listed at Grade II. This grade is the lowest of the three gradings given to listed buildings and is applied to "buildings of national importance and special interest".

Halewood originated as a small village that later became absorbed by residential development as a suburb of Liverpool. Its listed buildings consist of a church and two houses.

| Name and location | Photograph | Date | Notes |
|---|---|---|---|
| Yew Tree House; 53.36055°N 2.84134°W | | Mid 17th century (probable) | Originally a hunting lodge of the Earls of Derby, it started as a simple building in sandstone with a slate roof in two storeys with mullioned windows. Wings were added in 1780 and 1850; these are in brick and have sash windows, some of them horizontally-sliding. |
| Foxhill House; 53.37522°N 2.83223°W | | c. 1800 | A brick house in Georgian style, it is in two storeys and has a symmetrical front. In the centre is a doorway, and there are two sash windows on the ground floor and three on the upper floor. |
| St Nicholas' Church; 53.36946°N 2.82790°W | | 1838–39 | Originating as a simple church by A. Y and G. Williams, it was enlarged in 1847 by the addition of transepts and an apse. The tower by Cornelius Sherlock was built in 1882–83, and the apse was rebuilt in 1894. The church is in Early English style, and is constructed in sandstone with slate roofs and tiled ridges. It has a cruciform plan, and consists of a nave, transepts, a polygonal apse, and a southwest tower. The church contains a sequence of stained glass by Edward Burne-Jones and William Morris. |
| Gravestone of Blackie the war horse 53.35701°N 2.82094°W | | c. 1942 | The gravestone marks the burial place of Blackie, the horse of Lieutenant Leonard Comer Wall, who served and was killed in the First World War. Blackie received shrapnel wounds but survived the war and lived to the age of 35 years. The gravestone is in sandstone, it has a triangular head, steps at each end, and carries an inscription. The grave is surrounded by a white picket fence. |
