= Kirkby Urban District =

Former local government area in the UK

Coordinates: 53.482°N 2.882°W

Kirkby Urban District was a local government district in the administrative county of Lancashire, England, from 1958 to 1974. From 1949 onwards, the main settlement of the district was Kirkby new town. A District Council was created in 1958. The first meeting of the District Council was held on 9 April 1958. At that meeting it was resolved that Councillor James Wylie, J.P. be appointed Chairman of the Council

In 1974 it was abolished and its former area was transferred to Merseyside to be combined with that of Huyton with Roby Urban District, Prescot Urban District, parts of Whiston Rural District and parts of West Lancashire Rural District, to form the present-day Metropolitan Borough of Knowsley.
