= Tarbock =

Coordinates: 53.381827°N 2.803641°W

- Village
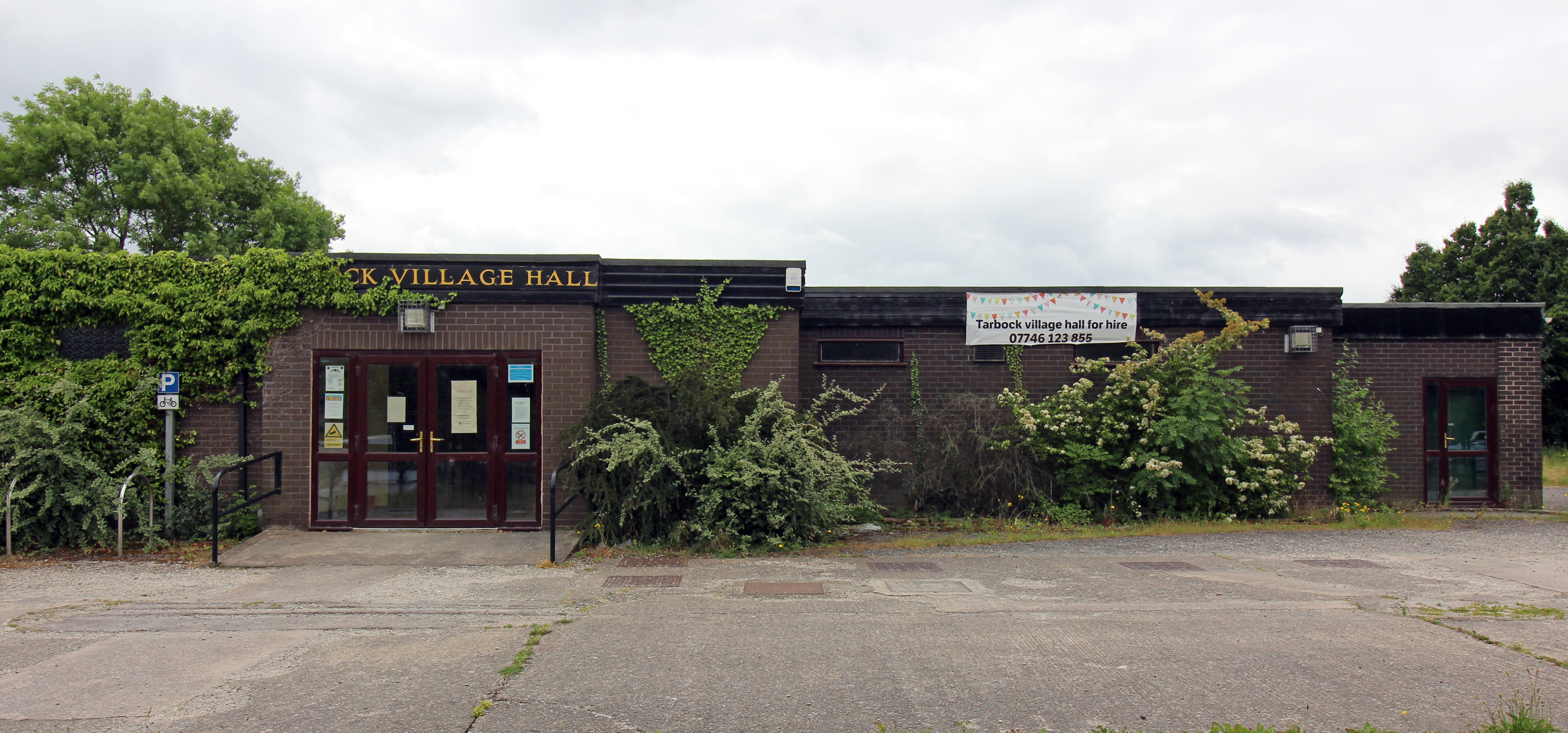
- Tarbock village hall

- Location within Merseyside
- Population: 2,382 (2001 Census)
- OS grid reference: SJ465875
- Metropolitan borough: Knowsley
- Metropolitan county: Merseyside
- Region: North West
- Country: England
- Sovereign state: United Kingdom
- Post town: LIVERPOOL
- Postcode district: L35, L36
- Dialling code: 0151
- Police: Merseyside
- Fire: Merseyside
- Ambulance: North West
- UK Parliament: Widnes and Halewood

Tarbock is a village and former civil parish within the Metropolitan Borough of Knowsley, in Merseyside, England. It is situated to the south east of Huyton and to the east of Netherley. The village itself is 6 miles (9.7 km) from Liverpool city centre, 3.5 miles (5.6 km) from Widnes and 2 miles (3.2 km) from Prescot. The M62 motorway junction 6 is in the area and is more familiarly called Tarbock Island. At the 2001 Census, the population of Tarbock was 2,382 (1,146 males, 1,236 females). The parish was abolished on 1 April 2014.

== History ==
In 2007, evidence of a Roman Tile works was found around the Tarbock Island area of the M62. The tiles were destined for army barracks in Chester. Other archaeology in the area suggests evidence of Roman and Medieval farming.

The spelling of Tarbock, named after a local brook, has changed more than any other in the West Derby Hundred. The variations have included Tarboc (1086), Turboc (1245), Terbock (1327), Tarbacke (1637) before it settled on its current form in the late seventeenth century. Currently it is known as "Tarbox" .

The Domesday Survey noted that the manor of Tarboc was one of those previously held by the Saxon Thane Dot. The parish along with that of 'Hitune' (Huyton) was granted to Henry II in 1150 before it was given to the Lathom family. Towards the end of the twelfth century the two were split between different branches of the family with Tarbock being assigned to Henry de Lathom. His son Richard was the first to adopt the name 'de Torbock'.

Tarbock Hall features in Saxton's map of Lancashire in 1577, although parts of the hall are believed to be fifteenth century in origin. It was surrounded by a 'moat' which was still very prominent on the Tithe map drawn up in 1847, although three sides were reported to have been filled in by the turn of this century. Ownership of the manor remained in the Lathom family, often through the female line, until 1611 when it was sold to Thomas Sutton, a London gentleman and founder of Charterhouse School. Unfortunately Sutton died a few months later and it was his nephew who sold the estate to Sir Richard Molyneux, the Earl of Sefton three years later for £10,500.

The oldest part of the area around Tarbock Green, often called Blue Duck corner after a former Inn. In the fourteenth century Tarbock Hall had its own private chapel but the villagers would have attended St. Michael's Church at Huyton. It is thought that a chapel was built at Tarbock Green in the mid sixteenth century. The building was pulled down in the late 1830s, despite being 'rich in carved woodwork', possibly due to the completion of a building of a Chapel of Ease at Halewood in 1839. This area which is now an important conservation area contains a number of old cottages, including one, believed to be the oldest in the village, which bears a datestone of 1776.

In the sixteenth century the manor is described as having two watermills, a windmill and a fulling mill. When the Earl of Sefton conducted a survey of his Estates in 1769 there was both a watermill and a windmill still in use. Even in the early twentieth century the township remained predominantly rural until the opening of a new coalmine at Halsnead Park. Located between the townships of Cronton, Tarbock and Whiston it was called the Cronton Colliery although some of the buildings were sited just within Tarbock. This had a huge impact on the local community as many of the farmers left the land to work on the mine.

William Webster, who died in 1684, bequeathed the interest of some shares he held for the poor of both Huyton and Tarbock. Known as Webster's Dole this legacy survived for nearly three hundred years. Another example of local charity is that of the Oddfellows. This group established a lodge in Prescot in 1827 and become very active in the area. In Tarbock alone during the late 1830s three separate lodges were founded; although two did very quickly disband due to lack of members, the Farmers Rest Lodge was more successful and held regular meetings in the Brick Wall Inn. Each July, to mark their foundation day, they would march along Greensbridge Road to Halewood.

Improved communications came in the late 1720s with the Liverpool-Warrington Turnpike Trust passing through the township, although it doesn't appear to have had the same impact it did in other townships it passed through. In the mid-1770s a canal to link the River Mersey with the Sankey Canal was proposed. This route would have gone via Halewood, Cronton and Tarbock but was opposed by the Earl of Derby and the Earl of Sefton as being unnecessary and after a few years the scheme was dropped.

In the late nineteenth century there seems to have been a phase of re-development, albeit on a small scale with the Post Office and Smithy building which was originally thatched, being rebuilt in 1884. In 1890 a large pavilion was built alongside the Brick Wall Inn and was an important centre for social and community events until it was demolished in 1940 as part of the complete re-building of the Brick Wall Inn site.

Of far more significance was the sale of the Tarbock Estate by a public auction in 1926 at the local Hare and Hounds Hotel. The Sale Catalogue that was produced for the sale provides a detailed insight into the various properties, their value and their tenants, many of whom bought their property. The Estate measured nearly 2,300 acres (9.3 km^{2}) and featured twenty farms including Georgeson's Farm and Wood Lane Farm and over fifty houses and cottages.

The original Brick Wall Inn was a plain square building built using handmade bricks and over a period of years a number of outbuildings including a shippon and stables were added. For over a century the licence was held by the Ambrose family. Until the 1880s the ale sold was that brewed by Fleetwood's at the Brewery House on the opposite side of the road. In the 1920s the brewery was bought by the Burtonwood Brewery Company, who made further alterations before it was demolished in 1940 and a new brewery house was built.

As the Brick Wall so clearly illustrates whilst many of the properties have histories attached to them, these are often the legacy of former buildings. More recently Tarbock has increased in prominence through its proximity to the Tarbock Interchange. This roundabout is believed to be the largest in Europe, with a circumference of a mile.

Tarbock was historically a township in the ancient parish of Huyton, in 1866, the legal definition of 'parish' was changed to be the areas used for administering the poor laws, and so Tarbock became a civil parish. In 1894 Tarbock became part of the Prescot Rural District of Lancashire which became Whiston Rural District in 1895. In 1974 Tarbock became part of Knowsley metropolitan district in the metropolitan county of Merseyside. In 2014 the parish was abolished and became unparished.

== Images ==
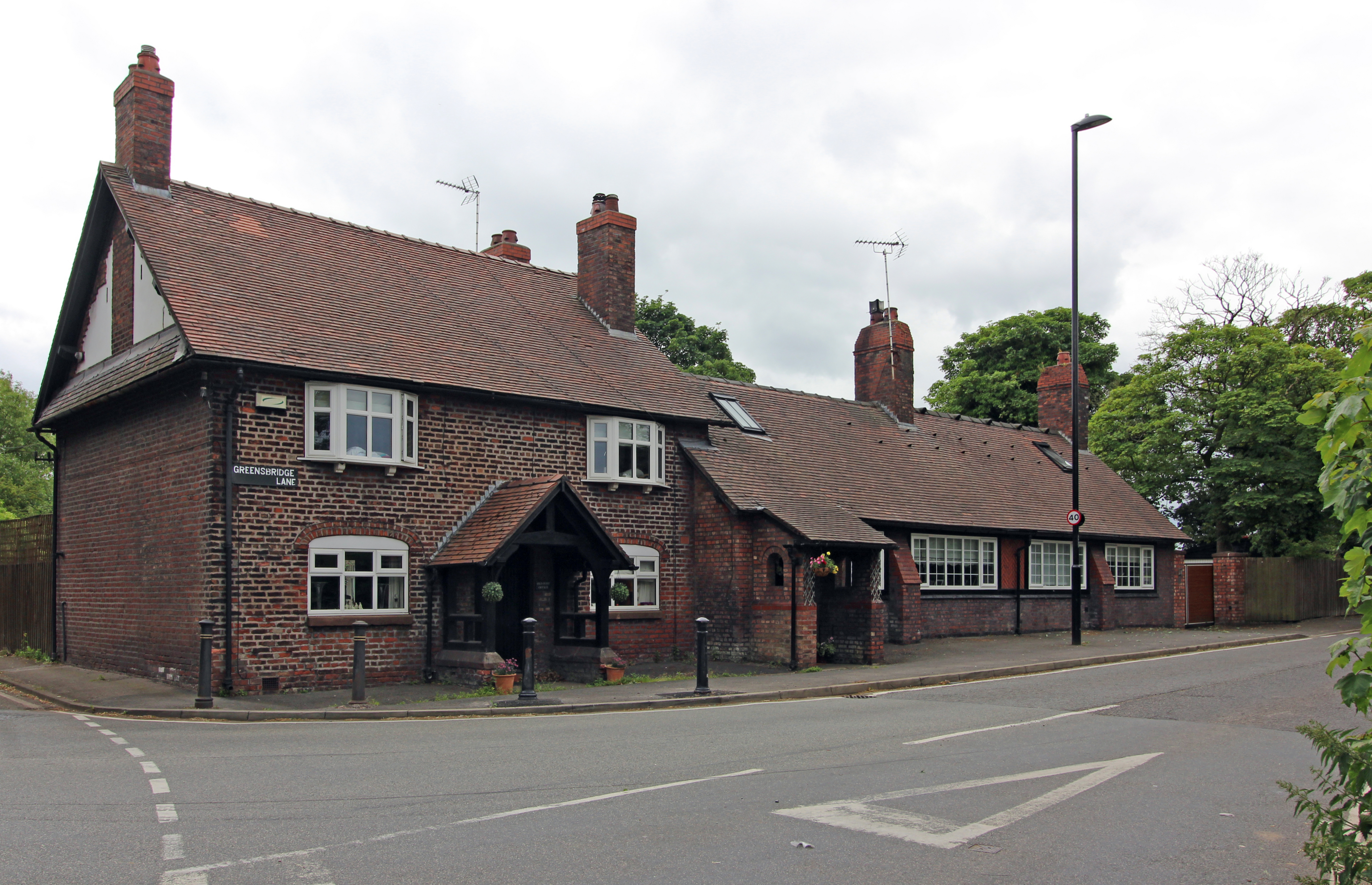
The old post office and smithy

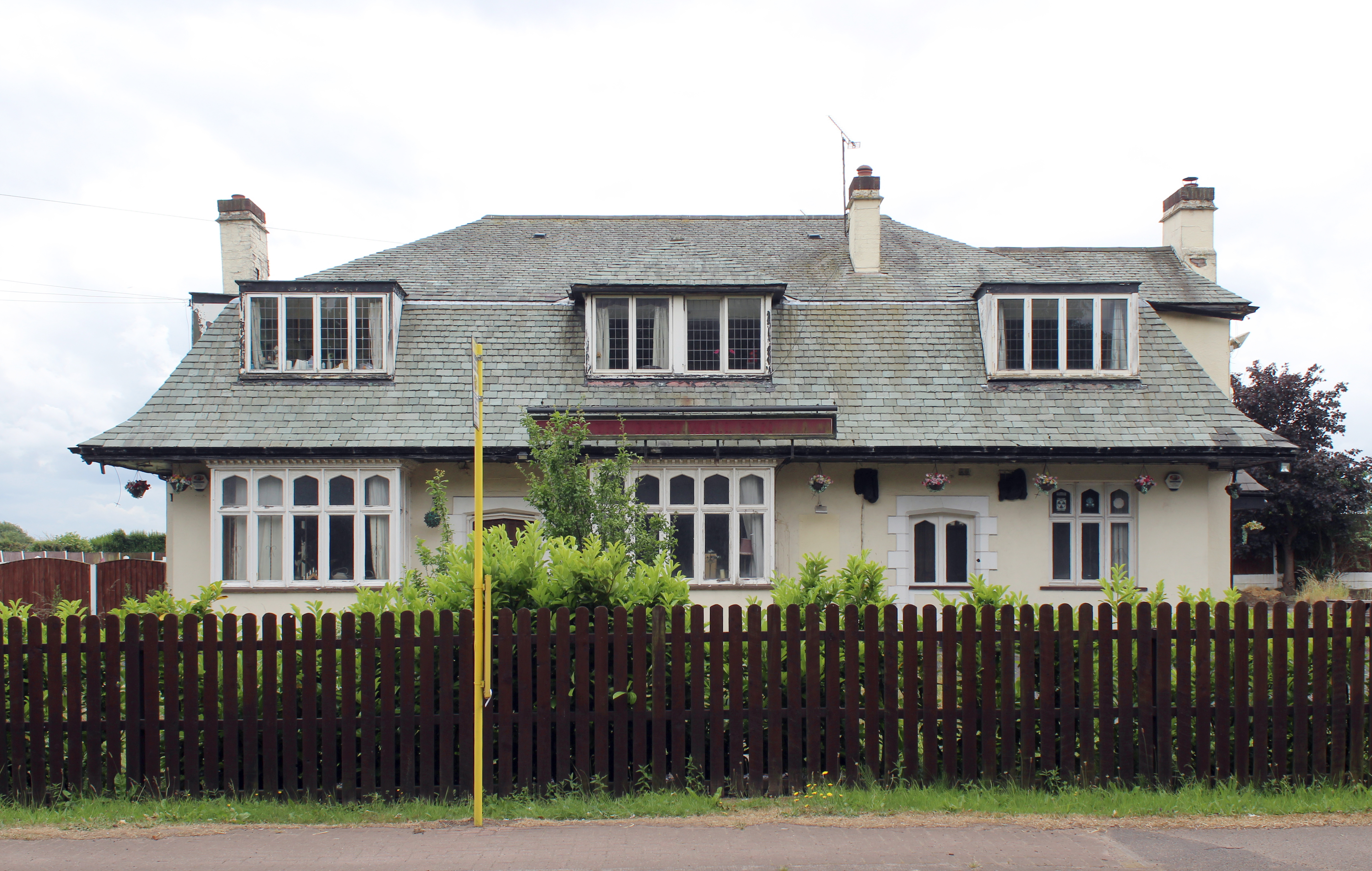
The Brick Wall former pub, now a cattery

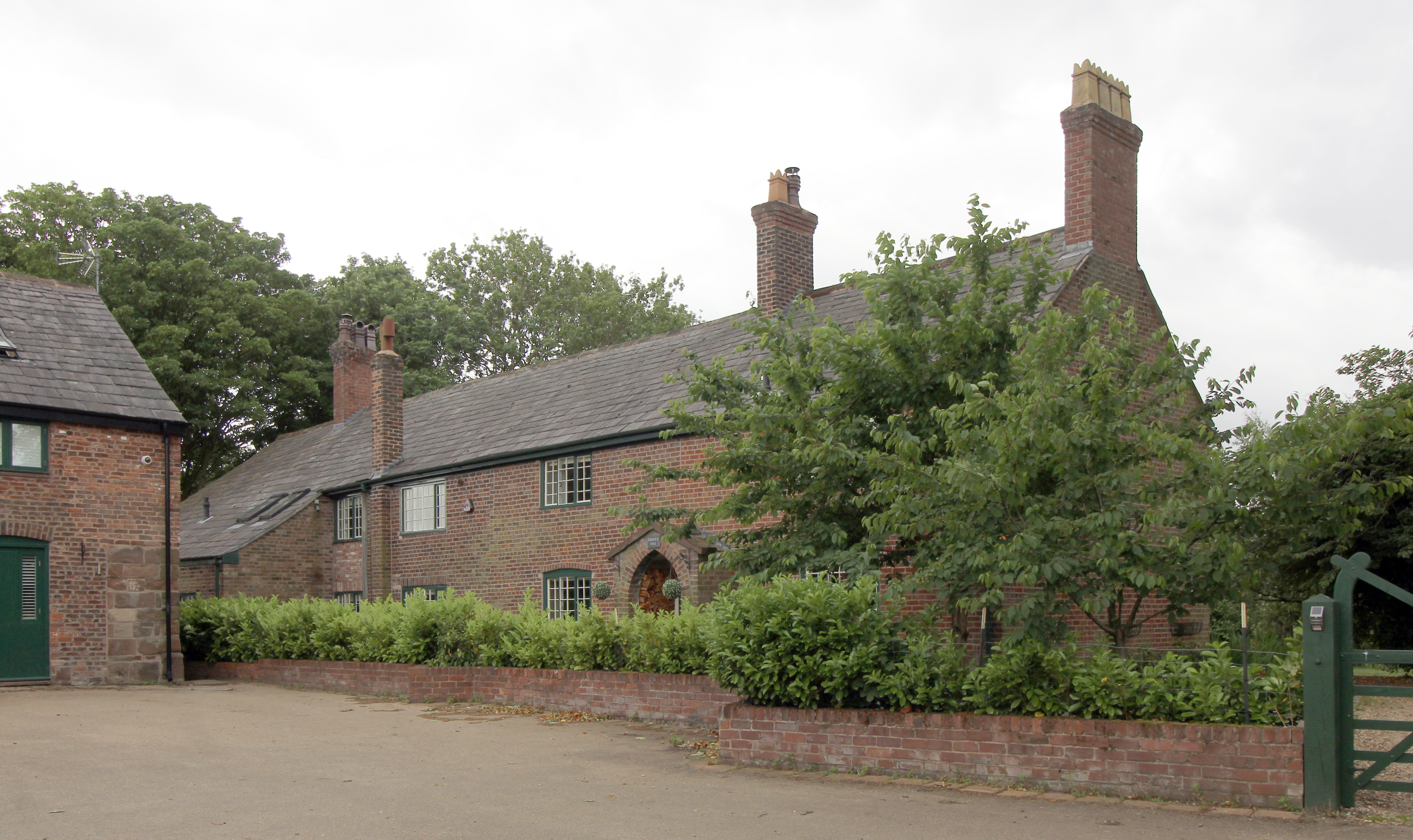
Farmhouse of Tarbock Hall Farm

== See also ==
- Listed buildings in Tarbock
