= Prescot Urban District =

Former local government area in the UK

Coordinates: 53.428°N 2.803°W

Prescot Urban District was a local government district in the administrative county of Lancashire, England, from 1895 to 1974.the main settlement of the district was the town of Prescot.

In 1974 it was abolished and its former area was transferred to Merseyside to be combined with that of Huyton with Roby Urban District, Kirkby Urban District, parts of Whiston Rural District and parts of West Lancashire Rural District to form the present-day Metropolitan Borough of Knowsley.
