= Huyton with Roby Urban District =

Historic former administration area in north-west England

Coordinates: 53.412°N 2.843°W

Huyton with Roby
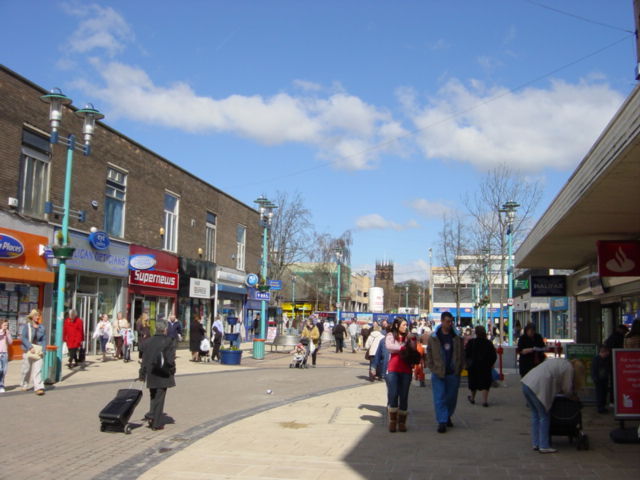
- Area
  - 1894; 132 years ago: 3,053
  - 1974: 3,054
- Population
  - 1901; 125 years ago: 4,661
  - 1971: 66,796
- History
  - Created: 1894; 132 years ago
  - Abolished: 1974
  - Succeeded by: Knowsley
- Status: Urban district

Huyton with Roby Urban District was a local government district in Lancashire, England, from 1894 to 1974. It consisted of the civil parish of Huyton with Roby which comprised the settlements of Huyton and Roby. It replaced the Huyton with Roby urban sanitary district.

In 1974 it was abolished and its former area was transferred to Merseyside, to be combined with Kirkby Urban District, Prescot Urban District, parts of Whiston Rural District and parts of West Lancashire Rural District to form the present-day Metropolitan Borough of Knowsley.
