= Whiston Rural District =

Former local government area in the UK

Coordinates: 53°23′N 2°48′W

Whiston
- History
  - Created: 1895
  - Abolished: 1974
  - Succeeded by: Knowsley; St Helens; Halton; Warrington
- Status: Rural district
  - HQ: Whiston

Whiston Rural District was a rural district of the administrative county of Lancashire, England. It was created in 1895 by renaming the Prescot Rural District when the parish of Prescot was removed from that rural district and created a separate urban district. Later the parish of Speke was incorporated into the City of Liverpool and Ditton into the Municipal Borough of Widnes. In 1922, the parish of Kirkby was added from the disbanded Sefton Rural District and removed again in 1958, when it was created a separate urban district. It was named after and administered from Whiston. In 1934 and 1954 parts of Windle and Eccleston were removed and placed in St Helens CB

The district was abolished by the Local Government Act 1972 on 1 April 1974. Its ten civil parishes were split between the Merseyside metropolitan boroughs of Knowsley and St Helens and the Cheshire boroughs of Halton and Warrington as follows:

- Cronton (Knowsley)
- Halewood (Knowsley)
- Knowsley (Knowsley)
- Tarbock (Knowsley)
- Whiston (Knowsley)
- Eccleston (St Helens)
- Rainhill (St Helens)
- Windle (St Helens)
- Bold (St Helens/Warrington)
- Hale (Halton)
