= West Lancashire Rural District =

Former local government area in the UK

Coordinates: 53.567°N 2.887°W

West Lancashire was a rural district from 1894 to 1974 in Lancashire, England. It was created with other rural districts in 1894, based on the Ormskirk rural sanitary district. It was expanded in 1932 by the abolition of the Sefton Rural District.

The district was abolished in 1974 under the Local Government Act 1972 and the area was divided as follows:

- The parishes of Aintree, Ince Blundell, Maghull, Melling, Netherton, Sefton and Thornton, most of the parish of Lydiate, and Little Altcar from the parish of Altcar, became part of the Metropolitan Borough of Sefton in Merseyside.
- The parish of Simonswood became part of the Metropolitan Borough of Knowsley in Merseyside.
- The remainder of the former rural district became part of the new district of West Lancashire in Lancashire.
