= Metropolitan Borough of Knowsley =

Borough of Knowsley
- Metropolitan borough
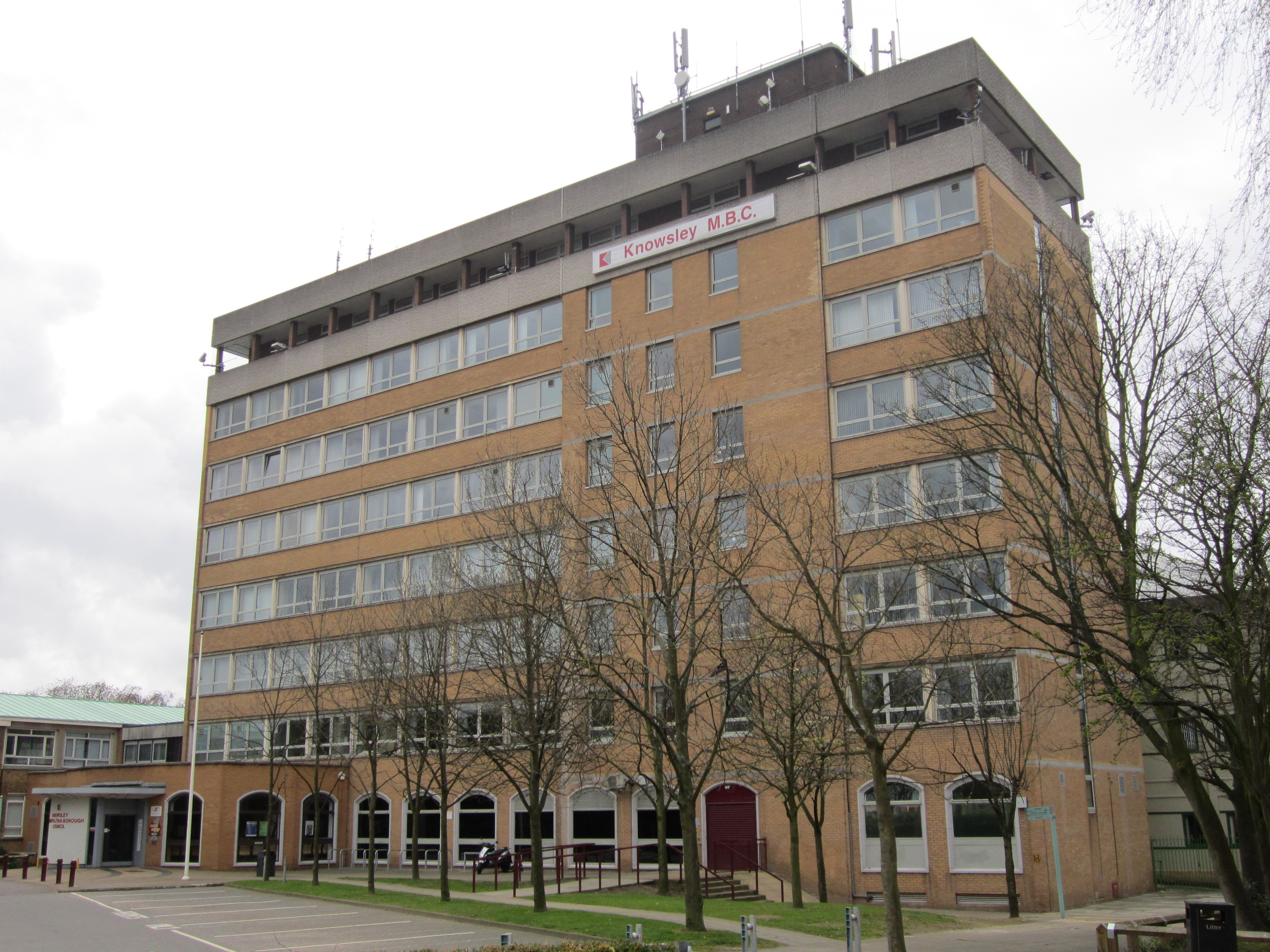
- Knowsley council headquarters in Huyton

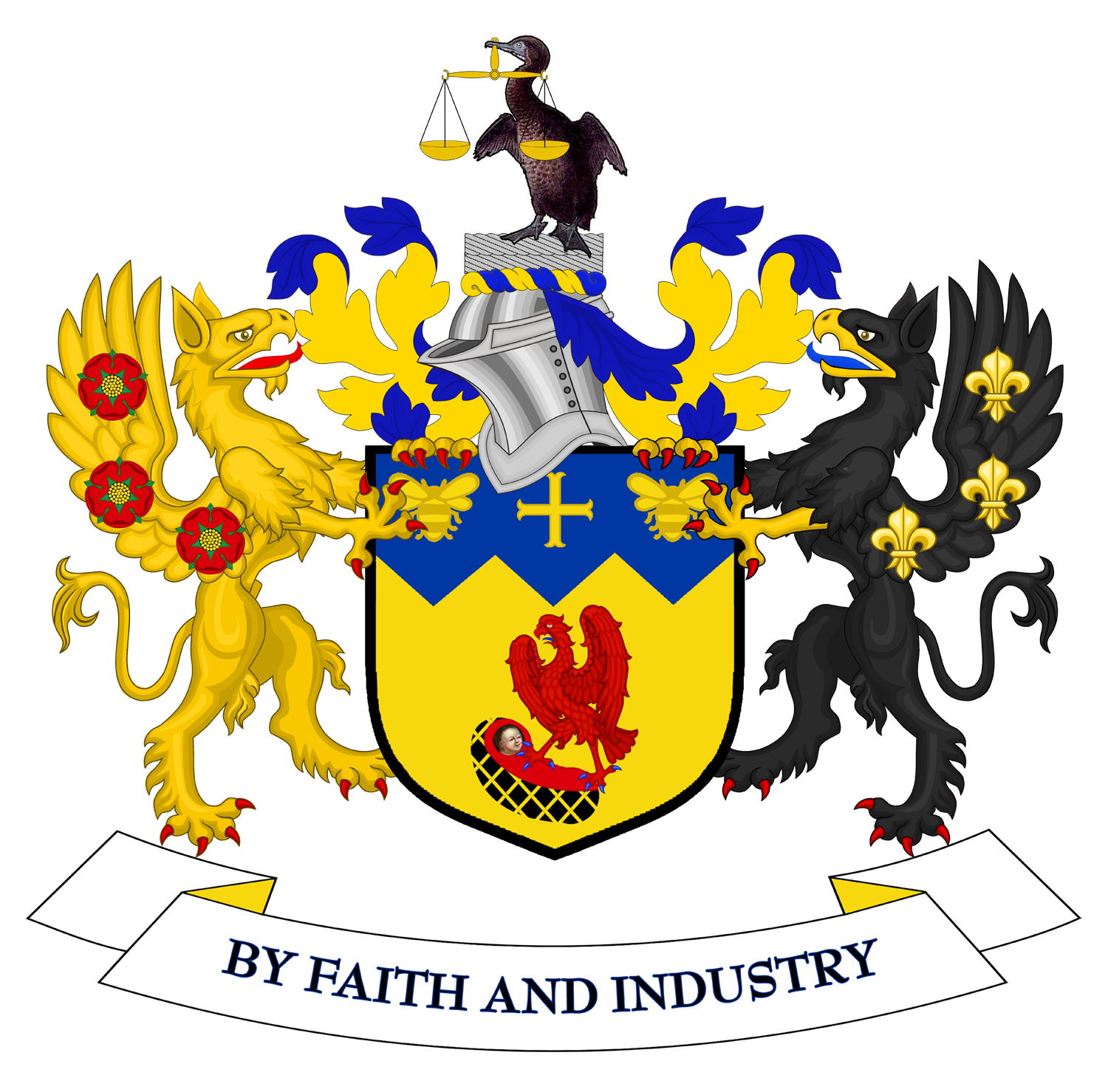
- Coat of arms
- Motto(s): By faith and industry
- Knowsley shown within Merseyside
- Coordinates: 53.439°N 2.851°W
- Sovereign state: United Kingdom
- Country: England
- Region: North West
- Ceremonial county: Merseyside
- City region: Liverpool
- Incorporated: 1 April 1974
- Named for: Knowsley Village
- Administrative HQ: Municipal Buildings, Huyton

Government
  - Type: Metropolitan borough
  - Body: Knowsley Metropolitan Borough Council
  - Executive: Leader and cabinet
  - Control: Labour
  - Leader: Graham J Morgan (L)
  - Mayor: Eddie Connor
  - MPs: Anneliese Midgley (L); Maria Eagle (L); Marie Rimmer (L)

Area
  - Total: 87 km^{2} (34 sq mi)
  - Rank: 208th

Population (2024)
  - Total: 162,565
  - Rank: 132nd
  - Density: 1,879/km^{2} (4,870/sq mi)

Ethnicity (2021)
  - Ethnic groups: List: 95.3% White; 1.7% Mixed; 1.6% Asian; 0.8% Black; 0.6% other

Religion (2021)
  - Religion: List: 66.6% Christianity; 27.2% no religion; 0.6% Islam; 0.3% Hinduism; 0.2% Buddhism; 0.1% Judaism; 0.0% Sikhism; 0.2% other; 4.8% not stated
- Time zone: UTC+0 (GMT)
  - Summer (DST): UTC+1 (BST)
- Postcode areas: L10; L14; L16; L25–26; L28; L32–36; WA8
- Dialling code: 0151
- ISO 3166 code: GB-KWL
- GSS code: E08000011
- Website: knowsley.gov.uk

The Metropolitan Borough of Knowsley is a metropolitan borough in Merseyside, North West England. It covers several towns and villages, including Kirkby, Prescot, Huyton, Roby, Whiston, Halewood, Cronton and Stockbridge Village; Kirkby, Huyton, and Prescot being the major commercial centres. It takes its name from the village of Knowsley, though its headquarters are in Huyton. It forms part of the wider Liverpool City Region.

Within the boundaries of the historic county of Lancashire, the borough was formed on 1 April 1974 by the merger of Huyton-with-Roby Urban District, Kirkby Urban District and Prescot Urban District, along with most of Whiston Rural District and a small part of West Lancashire Rural District, all from the administrative county of Lancashire.

It is known for Knowsley Hall and Knowsley Safari Park.

== History ==
The modern-day borough of Knowsley was formerly composed of villages and towns in Lancashire dating back to 650 AD. The Earls of Derby have their ancestral home in the borough at Knowsley Hall, the surroundings of which today house the popular visitor attraction of Knowsley Safari Park.

Knowsley experienced rapid population expansion in the 1950s and 1960s, resulting from the combination of industrialization and migration, including a significant amount of overspill development from Liverpool. By 1971, some 194,600 lived within the area which would become Knowsley. However, over the next two decades general economic decline – particularly in manufacturing – contributed to a significant fall in population to around 154,600 by 1994. Subsequently, a population stabilization strategy helped to stem this decline. The strategy was focused on house building and marketing the borough to secure inward investment. Record house building and strong growth in inward investment yielded the borough's first small rise in population in over 25 years in 1995. The population stabilized at over 154,000 for most of the rest of the 1990s.

The borough of Knowsley was created on 1 April 1974 under the Local Government Act 1972 covering the area of three former urban districts, which were abolished at the same time, plus six civil parishes (five from Whiston Rural District and one from West Lancashire Rural District):

- Cronton‡
- Halewood‡
- Huyton with Roby Urban District
- Kirkby Urban District
- Knowsley‡
- Prescot Urban District
- Simonswood parish from West Lancashire Rural District
- Tarbock‡
- Whiston‡

‡Parishes from Whiston Rural District

All the component parts of Knowsley had previously been in the administrative county of Lancashire, but were transferred to the new metropolitan county of Merseyside at the same time the district came into being on 1 April 1974. A committee of councillors from the outgoing district councils chose the name Knowsley for the new district in 1972, taking the name from Knowsley village, being a central location within the new district, rather than using the name of one of the three urban districts which had the majority of the population. The committee noted that the Knowsley Hall estate had historic connections to all the constituent parts of the new district. The government confirmed the name in 1973. The new district was awarded borough status from its creation, allowing the chairman of the council to take the title of mayor.

== Geography ==
=== Settlements ===
- Bowring Park
- Cronton
- Halewood
- Huyton
- Kirkby
- Knowsley Village
- Page Moss
- Prescot
- Roby
- Stockbridge Village
- Tarbock
- Whiston

== Governance ==
=== Westminster ===
The residents of Knowsley Metropolitan Borough are represented in the British Parliament by Members of Parliament (MPs) for three separate parliamentary constituencies. Knowsley is represented by Anneliese Midgley MP (Labour), Garston and Halewood is represented by Maria Eagle MP (Labour) and St Helens South and Whiston is represented by Marie Rimmer MP (Labour).

=== Knowsley Council Composition ===
After local elections in 2008 the Metropolitan Borough of Knowsley was governed by the Labour Party, the largest party represented on the council. The Liberal Democrats, the second largest party, were in opposition. There were no other councillors.

Year	Labour	Liberal Democrats
2008	47	16
2010	53	10
2011	59	4
2012	63	0
2016	42	3

After local elections in 2010 the Metropolitan Borough of Knowsley continued to be governed by the Labour Party, the largest party represented on the council, who increased their total number of seats by 5 to 53. The Liberal Democrats, the second largest party represented on the council, continued to be in opposition losing 5 seats to the governing Labour Party to decrease their total number of seats to 10.

After local elections in 2011 the Metropolitan Borough of Knowsley continued to be governed by the Labour Party, the largest party represented on the council, who increased their total number of seats to 59. The Liberal Democrats, the second largest party represented on the council, continued to be in opposition losing 6 seats to the governing Labour Party to decrease their total number of seats to 4.

After the local elections in 2012, Knowsley became a one party borough, completely taking out the Liberal Democrat seats.

In 2016 the number of seats was reduced to 45 with the Liberal Democrats winning three

Following several years of subsequent elections, the political composition is now Labour 33, Green 5, Liberal Democrats 3, Independent 3 with one vacancy in Page Moss ward.

=== Liverpool City Region Combined Authority ===
The Metropolitan Borough of Knowsley is one of the six constituent local government districts of the Liverpool City Region. Since 1 April 2014, some of the borough's responsibilities have been pooled with neighbouring authorities within the metropolitan area and subsumed into the Liverpool City Region Combined Authority.

The combined authority has effectively become the top-tier administrative body for the local governance of the city region and the leader of Knowsley Council, along with the five other leaders from neighbouring local government districts, take strategic decisions over economic development, transport, employment and skills, tourism, culture, housing and physical infrastructure.

The Liverpool City Region, which includes Knowsley, is also governed by the Mayor of the Liverpool City Region who is directly elected by the residents of the Liverpool City Region and has powers over a number of areas, the incumbent Mayor is Steve Rotheram of the Labour Party.

== Demography ==
According to the 2011 census, 80.9% of people in Knowsley describe themselves as Christian, the highest proportion in any local authority in England and Wales. This is significantly different from average figures from the 2011 census for England and Wales, which showed that 59.3 per cent of the population identified as Christian and 14.1 million people, around a quarter of the population in England and Wales, reported that they have no religion.

== Twin towns ==
Knowsley is twinned with:

- Moers, Germany

== Freedom of the Borough ==
The following people and military units have received the Freedom of the Borough of Knowsley.

=== Individuals ===
- Steven George Gerrard: 11 November 2008.

=== Military units ===
- The Duke of Lancaster's Regiment: 12 October 2009.

=== Organisations and Groups ===
- The St Helens and Knowsley Teaching Hospitals NHS Trust: April 2021.

== See also ==
- Knowsley United F.C.
- List of schools in Knowsley
- Knowsley Metropolitan Borough Council elections
