= Merseyside =

County of England

- Metropolitan and ceremonial county
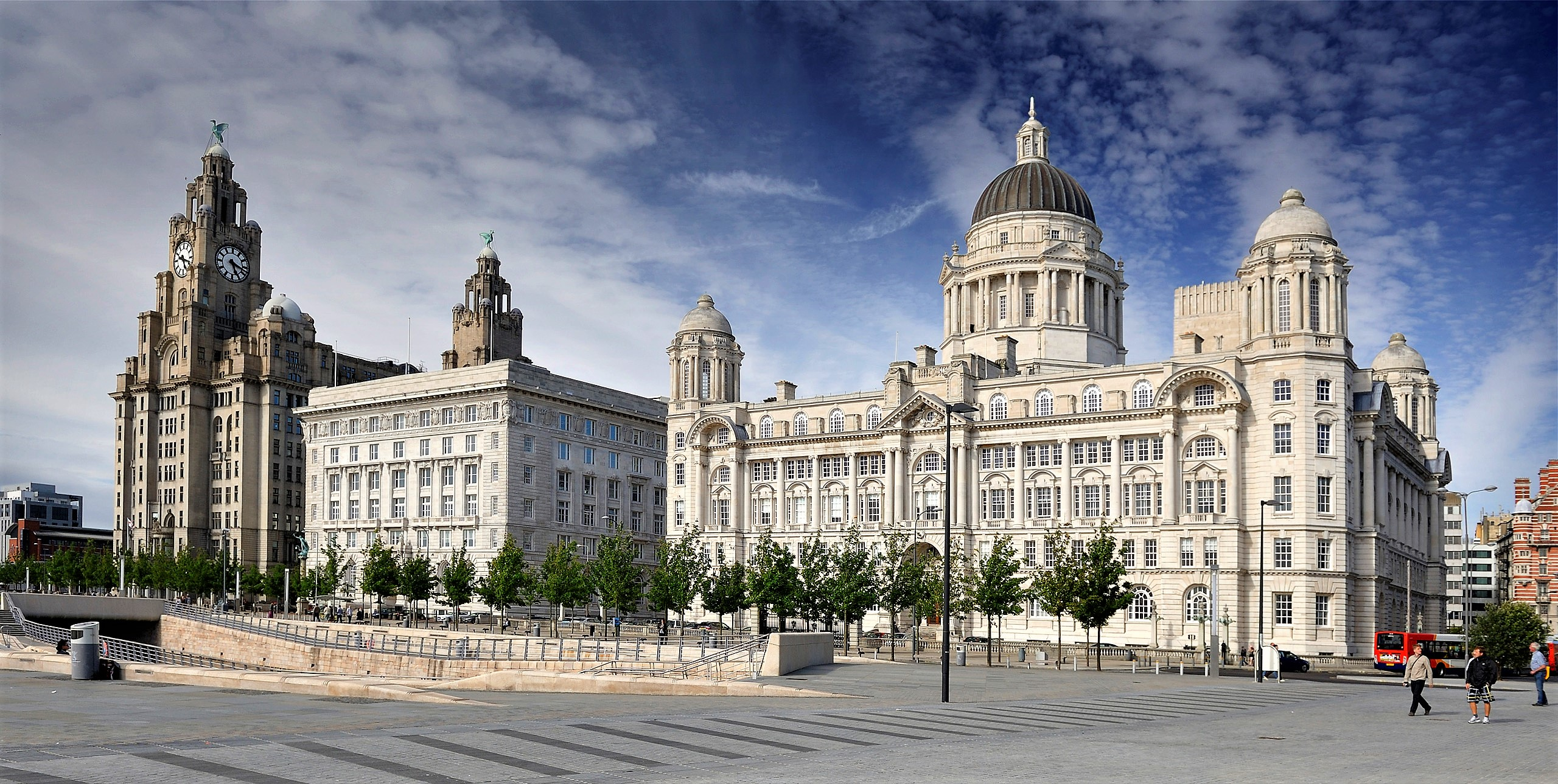
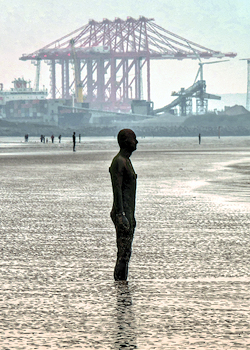
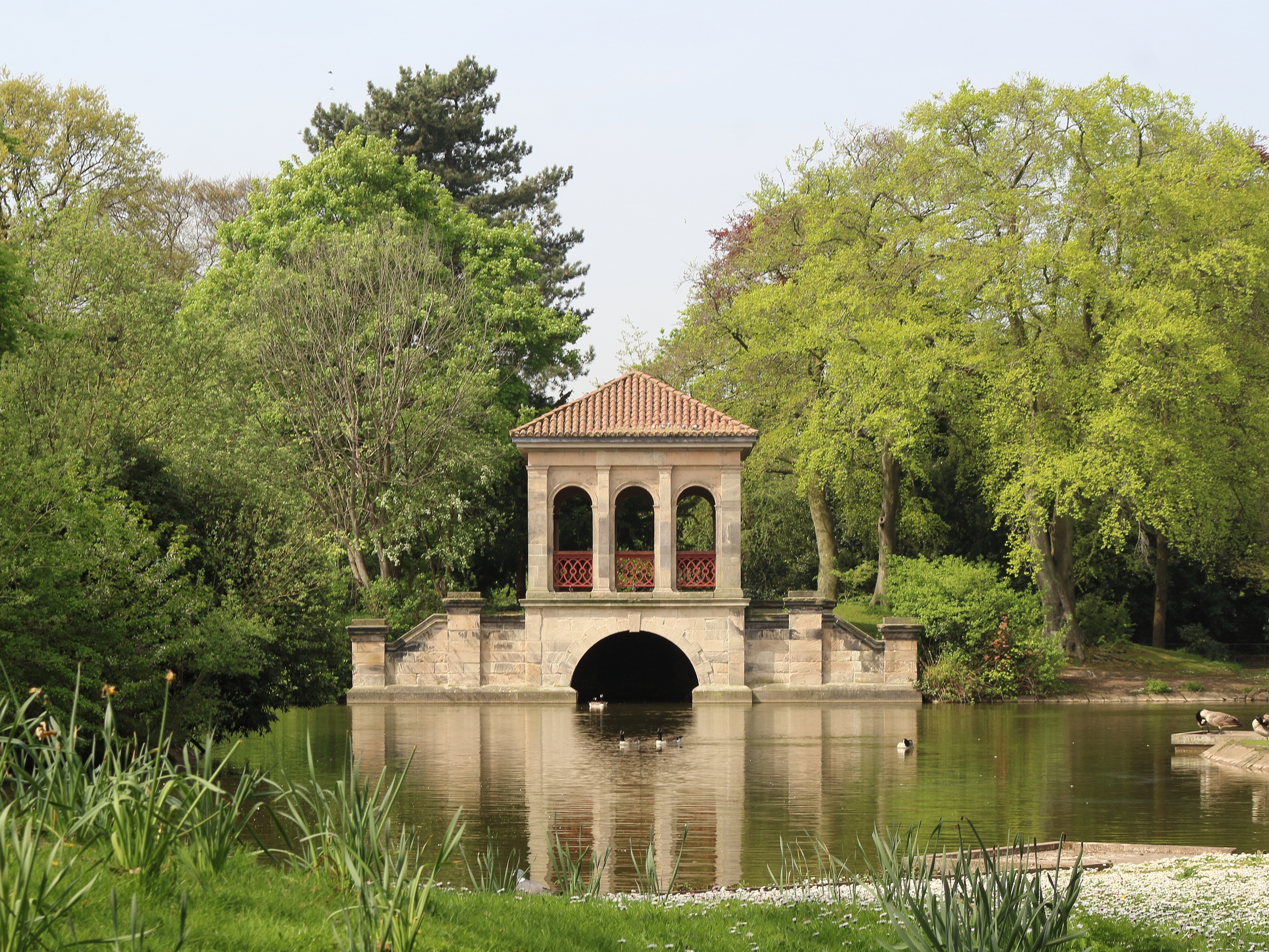
- Left to right: Pier Head, Liverpool; Another Place at Crosby Beach; Roman pavilion at Birkenhead Park

- Location of Merseyside within England
- Coordinates: 53°25′N 3°00′W
- Sovereign state: United Kingdom
- Constituent country: England
- Region: North West England
- Established: 1 April 1974
- Established by: Local Government Act 1972
- Time zone: UTC+0 (GMT)
  - Summer (DST): UTC+1 (BST)
- UK Parliament: 15 MPs
- Police: Merseyside Police
- Largest city: Liverpool
- Ceremonial county
- Lord Lieutenant: Mark Blundell
- High Sheriff: Hazel Julie Snell
- Area: 652 km^{2} (252 sq mi)
  - Rank: 43rd of 48
- Population (2024): 1,475,541
  - Rank: 9th of 48
  - Density: 2,262/km^{2} (5,860/sq mi)
- Metropolitan county
- GSS code: E11000002
- Districts
- Districts of Merseyside; Metropolitan districts
- Districts: 1. City of Liverpool; 2. Sefton; 3. Knowsley; 4. St Helens; 5. Wirral

Merseyside (/ˈmɜːzisaɪd/ MER-zee-syde) is a ceremonial and metropolitan county in North West England. It borders Lancashire to the north, Greater Manchester to the east, Cheshire to the south, the Welsh county of Flintshire across the Dee Estuary to the southwest, and the Irish Sea to the west. The largest settlement is the city of Liverpool.

The county is highly urbanised, with an area of 249 square miles (645 km^{2}) and a population of 1,475,541 in 2024. Liverpool is in the centre of the county on the east bank of the Mersey Estuary, and Birkenhead opposite on the west bank. St Helens is in the east of the county, and Southport in the north. For local government purposes the county comprises five metropolitan boroughs: Knowsley, St Helens, Sefton, Wirral, and Liverpool. The borough councils, together with that of Halton in Cheshire, collaborate through the Liverpool City Region Combined Authority.

What is now Merseyside was a largely rural area until the Industrial Revolution, when Liverpool and Birkenhead's positions on the Mersey Estuary enabled them to expand. Liverpool became a major port, heavily involved in the Atlantic slave trade and in supplying cotton to the mills of Lancashire, and Birkenhead developed into a centre for shipbuilding. Innovations during this period included the first inter-city railway, the first publicly-funded civic park, advances in dock technology, and a pioneering elevated electrical railway. The county was established in 1974, before which the entirety of the Wirral was in Cheshire and the remainder of the county was in Lancashire.

Merseyside is notable for its sport, music, and cultural institutions. The Merseybeat genre developed in what is now the county, which has also produced many artists and bands, including the Beatles. The county contains several football clubs, with Everton and Liverpool playing in the Premier League. The Royal Liverpool and Royal Birkdale golf clubs have hosted The Open Championship 22 times between them, and the Grand National is the most valuable jump race in Europe. National Museums Liverpool comprises nine museums and art galleries.

== History ==
According to the OED, the earliest use of the word Merseyside (presumably as a general term for the lands surrounding the river) is from 1899.

The county of Merseyside was created in 1974, under the Local Government Act 1972, from areas previously administered within the counties of Lancashire and Cheshire, together with the independent county boroughs of Birkenhead, Bootle, Liverpool, St Helens, Southport and Wallasey.

Merseyside had been designated a "Special Review" area in the Local Government Act 1958. The Local Government Commission for England started a review of this area in 1962, based around the core county boroughs of Liverpool, Bootle, Birkenhead and Wallasey. Further areas, including Widnes and Runcorn, were added to the Special Review Area by Order in 1965. Draft proposals were published in 1965, but the commission never completed its final proposals as it was abolished in 1966.

Instead, a Royal Commission was set up to review English local government entirely, and its report (known as the Redcliffe-Maud Report) proposed a much wider Merseyside metropolitan area covering southwest Lancashire and northwest Cheshire, extending as far south as Chester and as far north as the River Ribble. This would have included four districts: Southport/Crosby, Liverpool/Bootle, St Helens/Widnes and Wirral/Chester. Meanwhile, in 1970 the Merseyside Passenger Transport Executive (which operates today under the Merseytravel brand) was set up, covering Liverpool, Sefton, Wirral and Knowsley, but excluding Southport and St Helens.

The Redcliffe-Maud Report was rejected by the Conservative government elected in 1970, but the concept of a two-tier metropolitan area based on the Mersey area was retained in a white paper published in 1971. The Local Government Bill presented to Parliament involved a substantial trimming from the white paper, excluding the northern and southern fringes of the area, Chester, and Ellesmere Port; and, for the first time, including Southport, whose council had requested to be included. Further alterations took place in Parliament, with Skelmersdale being removed from the area, and a proposed district including St Helens and Huyton being subdivided into what are now the metropolitan boroughs of St Helens and Knowsley.

Merseyside was established as a metropolitan county on 1 April 1974 under the Local Government Act 1972, as part of a major reform of local government in England and Wales.

Following the creation of Merseyside, Merseytravel expanded to take in St Helens and Southport.

Post-1974		Pre-1974			
Metropolitan county	Metropolitan borough	County boroughs	Non-county boroughs	Urban districts	Rural districts
Merseyside is an amalgamation of 22 former local government districts, including six county boroughs and two municipal boroughs.	Knowsley			Huyton with Roby • Kirkby • Prescot	West Lancashire • Whiston
Merseyside is an amalgamation of 22 former local government districts, including six county boroughs and two municipal boroughs.	Liverpool	Liverpool			
Merseyside is an amalgamation of 22 former local government districts, including six county boroughs and two municipal boroughs.	Sefton	Bootle • Southport	Crosby	Formby • Litherland	West Lancashire
Merseyside is an amalgamation of 22 former local government districts, including six county boroughs and two municipal boroughs.	St Helens	St Helens		Newton-in-Makerfield • Billinge and Winstanley • Haydock • Rainford	Whiston
Merseyside is an amalgamation of 22 former local government districts, including six county boroughs and two municipal boroughs.	Wirral	Birkenhead • Wallasey	Bebington	Hoylake • Wirral	

== Governance ==
At first, the county had a two-tier system of local government: the five metropolitan boroughs shared power with the Merseyside County Council, which was based in Liverpool. The first elections of the 99 members of the county council were held in April 1973, in advance of the formal establishment of the council on 1 April 1974. The body had a strategic role in areas such as transport; the boroughs had more powers than non-metropolitan districts, in that they were additionally responsible for education and social services, responsibilities allocated to county councils elsewhere.

In 1986 the county council, along with all other metropolitan county councils, was abolished under the Local Government Act 1985. Thus the boroughs are now effectively unitary authorities.

== Geography ==
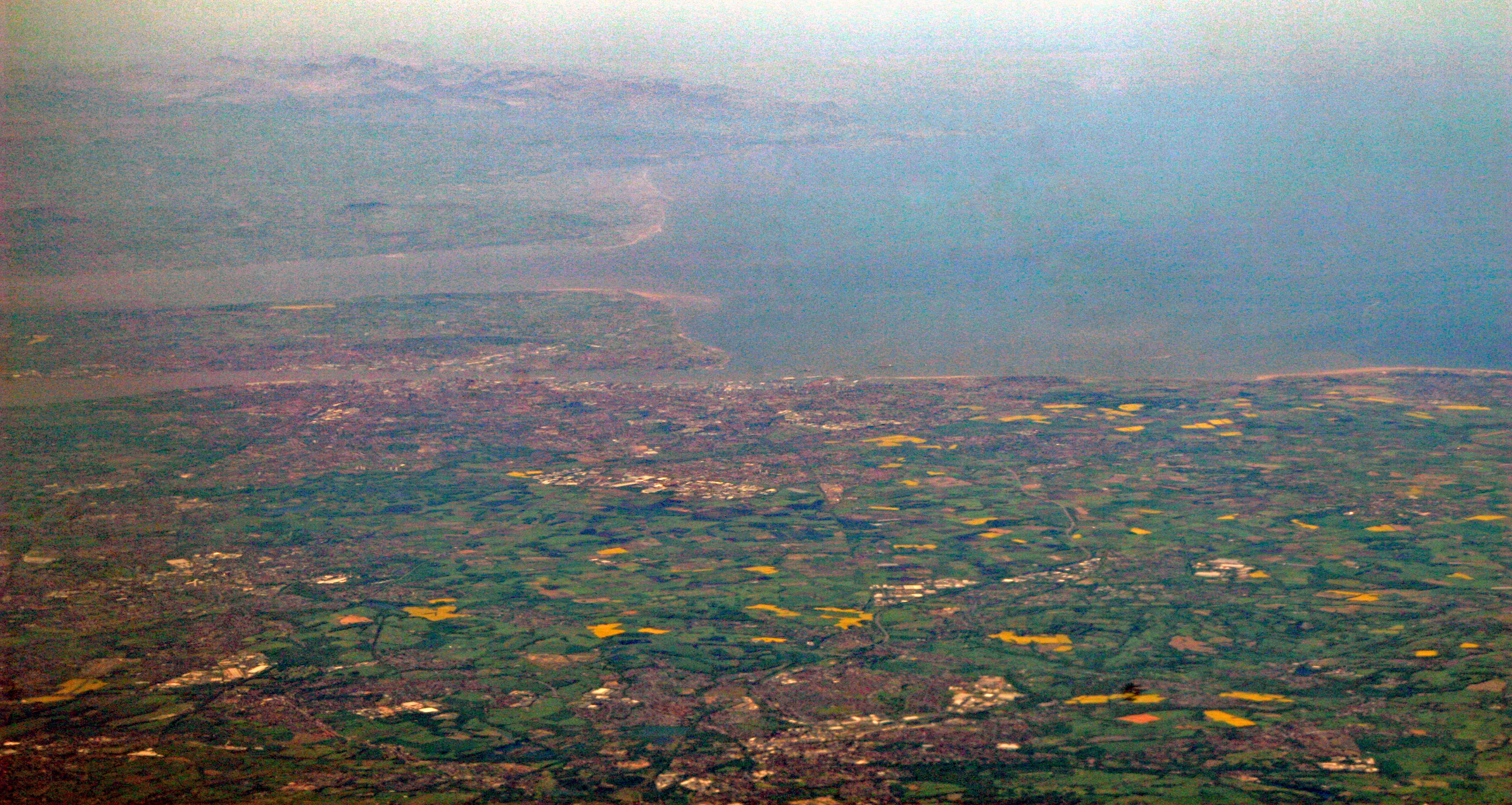
An aerial photograph of Merseyside

Merseyside is divided into two parts by the Mersey estuary; the Wirral is on the west side of the estuary, upon the Wirral Peninsula, and the rest of the county lies on the east side. The eastern part of Merseyside borders onto Lancashire to the north and Greater Manchester to the east, with both parts of the county bordering Cheshire to the south. The territory comprising the county of Merseyside previously formed part of the administrative counties of Lancashire (east of the River Mersey) and Cheshire (west of the River Mersey). The two parts are linked by the two Mersey Tunnels, the Wirral line of Merseyrail, and the Mersey Ferry.

=== Green belt ===
Merseyside contains green belt interspersed throughout the county, surrounding the Liverpool urban area, as well as across the Mersey in the Wirral area, with further pockets extending towards and surrounding Southport, as part of the western edge of the North West Green Belt. It was first drawn up from the 1950s. All the county's districts contain some portion of belt.

== Demography ==
Population of Merseyside by district (2025)
District	Land area		Population		Density (/km^{2})
District	(km^{2})	(%)	People	(%)	Density (/km^{2})
Knowsley	87	13%	163,723	11%	1,893
Liverpool	112	17%	507,915	34%	4,541
St Helens	136	21%	189,890	13%	1,393
Sefton	157	24%	287,583	19%	1,837
Wirral	161	25%	329,896	22%	2,050
Merseyside	652	100%	1,479,007	100%	2,268

Ethnicity
Ethnic Group	1971 estimations		1981 estimations		1991 census		2001 census		2011 census		2021 census	
Ethnic Group	Number	%	Number	%	Number	%	Number	%	Number	%	Number	%
White: Total	–	99.5%	1,500,267	98.6%	1,422,453	98.1%	1,322,938	97.1%	1,305,303	94.5%	1,304,797	91.7%
White: British	–	–	–	–	–	–	1,297,777	95.3%	1,268,277	91.8%	1,242,323	87.3%
White: Irish	–	–	–	–	–	–	13,005	1.0%	13,342	1.0%	13,508	0.9%
White: Gypsy or Irish Traveller (Note: New category created for the 2011 census)	–	–	–	–	–	–	–	–	457	0.0%	763	0.1%
White: Roma (Note: New category created for the 2021 census)	–	–	–	–	–	–	–	–	–	–	1,696	0.1%
White: Other	–	–	–	–	–	–	12,156	0.9%	23,227	1.7%	46,507	3.3%
Asian or Asian British: Total	–	–	9,061	0.6%	11,624	0.8%	16,511	1.2%	30,405	2.2%	44,452	3.1%
Asian or Asian British: Indian	–	–	2,248	0.1%	2,740	0.2%	3,769	0.3%	7,896	0.6%	10,686	0.8%
Asian or Asian British: Pakistani	–	–	716	0.0%	912	0.1%	1,528	0.1%	2,566	0.2%	4,723	0.3%
Asian or Asian British: Bangladeshi	–	–	489	0.0%	764	0.1%	1,266	0.1%	2,366	0.2%	3,863	0.3%
Asian or Asian British: Chinese (Note: In 2001, listed under the 'Chinese or other ethnic group' heading.)	–	–	4,719	0.3%	5,895	0.4%	8,129	0.6%	11,554	0.8%	13,194	0.9%
Asian or Asian British: Other Asian	–	–	889	0.1%	1,313	0.1%	1,819	0.1%	6,023	0.4%	11,986	0.8%
Black or Black British: Total	–	–	8,344	0.5%	9,914	0.7%	6,838	0.5%	14,552	1.1%	21,902	1.5%
Black or Black British: African	–	–	2,630	0.2%	3,093	0.2%	3,722	0.3%	9,792	0.7%	16,091	1.1%
Black or Black British: Caribbean	–	–	1,890	0.1%	2,208	0.2%	1,600	0.1%	2,066	0.1%	2,364	0.2%
Black or Black British: Other Black	–	–	3,824	0.3%	4,613	0.3%	1,516	0.1%	2,694	0.2%	3,447	0.2%
Mixed: Total	–	–	–	–	–	–	13,189	1.0%	20,954	1.5%	30,495	2.1%
Mixed: White and Black Caribbean	–	–	–	–	–	–	3,918	0.3%	6,395	0.5%	7,280	0.5%
Mixed: White and Black African	–	–	–	–	–	–	3,157	0.2%	4,894	0.4%	7,021	0.5%
Mixed: White and Asian	–	–	–	–	–	–	2,714	0.2%	4,638	0.3%	7,666	0.5%
Mixed: Other Mixed	–	–	–	–	–	–	3,400	0.2%	5,027	0.4%	8,528	0.6%
Other: Total	–	–	4,531	0.3%	5,713	0.4%	2,550	0.2%	9,975	0.7%	21,640	1.5%
Other: Arab	–	–	–	–	–	–	–	–	6,379	0.5%	10,086	0.7%
Other: Any other ethnic group	–	–	–	–	–	–	2,550	0.2%	3,596	0.3%	11,554	0.8%
Non-White: Total	–	0.5%	21,932	1.4%	27,247	1.9%	39,088	2.9%	75,886	5.5%	118,489	8.3%
Total	–	100%	1,522,199	100%	1,449,700	100%	1,362,026	100%	1,381,189	100%	1,423,286	100%

== Identity ==
Ipsos MORI polls in the boroughs of Sefton and Wirral in the 2000s showed that in general, residents of these boroughs identified slightly more strongly to Merseyside than to Lancashire or Cheshire respectively, but their affinity to Merseyside was more likely to be "fairly strong" than "very strong".

== Local government ==
=== Metropolitan boroughs ===
Merseyside comprises the metropolitan boroughs of Liverpool, Knowsley, Sefton, St Helens and Wirral.

=== Combined authority ===
The Liverpool City Region Combined Authority, which includes the five boroughs of Merseyside and the Borough of Halton in Cheshire, oversees functions given to it under the area's devolution deal with the UK government, such as transport, housing, innovation, employment, energy, tourism, and trade, and some responsibilities relating to crime and justice.

The combined authority is led by the Mayor of the Liverpool City Region, Steve Rotheram, who was elected in 2017 and re-elected in 2021 and in 2024.

=== County-level functions ===
Following the abolition of the county council, some local services are run by joint-boards of the five metropolitan boroughs; these include the:

- Merseyside Police and Crime Commissioner and Merseyside Police
- Merseyside Fire and Rescue Service
- Merseyside Recycling and Waste Authority
- Merseyside Pension Scheme, administered by Wirral Council, with offices in Liverpool

== Healthcare ==
The planning and commissioning of care within Merseyside is the responsibility of an integrated care system, NHS Cheshire and Merseyside, which covers NHS and other care services within the Cheshire and Merseyside areas. It also oversees Cheshire and Merseyside Health and Care Partnership. NHS Cheshire and Merseyside serves a combined population of 2.7 million as of 2024.

== Economy ==
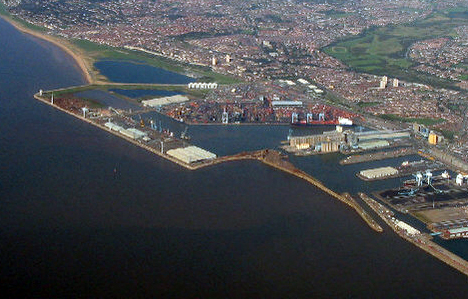
Port of Liverpool docks, at Seaforth. Merseyside lies on the Mersey Estuary

GVA and GDP by local authority district in 2021
District	GVA (£ billions)	GVA per capita (£)	GDP (£ billions)	GDP per capita (£)
Knowsley	£4.0	£25,927	£4.6	£29,407
Liverpool	£14.3	£29,489	£15.9	£32,841
St Helens	£2.8	£15,448	£3.4	£18,803
Sefton	£4.6	£16,275	£5.4	£19,418
Wirral	£5.6	£17,527	£6.6	£20,688
Merseyside	£31.3	£22,000	£36.0	£25,281

== Transport ==
=== Road ===
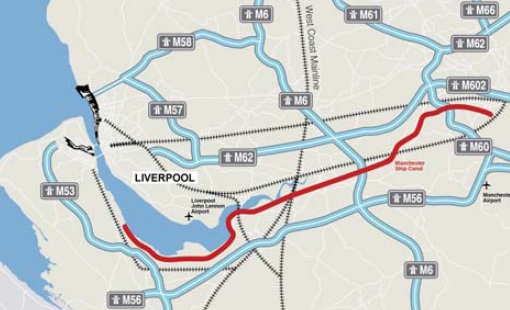
The motorway network around Merseyside

Merseyside is served by six motorways: the M58 to the north, M56 to the south, M6 & M62 to the east and M53 to the west. The M57 acts as an outer ring road and bypass for the city of Liverpool itself. The River Mersey is crossed by Queensway Tunnel and Kingsway Tunnel, which link Liverpool to Birkenhead and Wallasey respectively, and by the Silver Jubilee Bridge and Mersey Gateway Bridge, which link Runcorn and Widnes. The Mersey Gateway Bridge opened in 2017 and is designed to improve transport links between Widnes and Runcorn and other key locations in the vicinity.

National Cycle Route 56 and National Cycle Route 62 pass through the region, the former along the Wirral and the latter from Southport to Runcorn. Major bus companies are Stagecoach Merseyside and Arriva North West. Liverpool One bus station serves as a terminus for national coach travel.

=== Railway ===
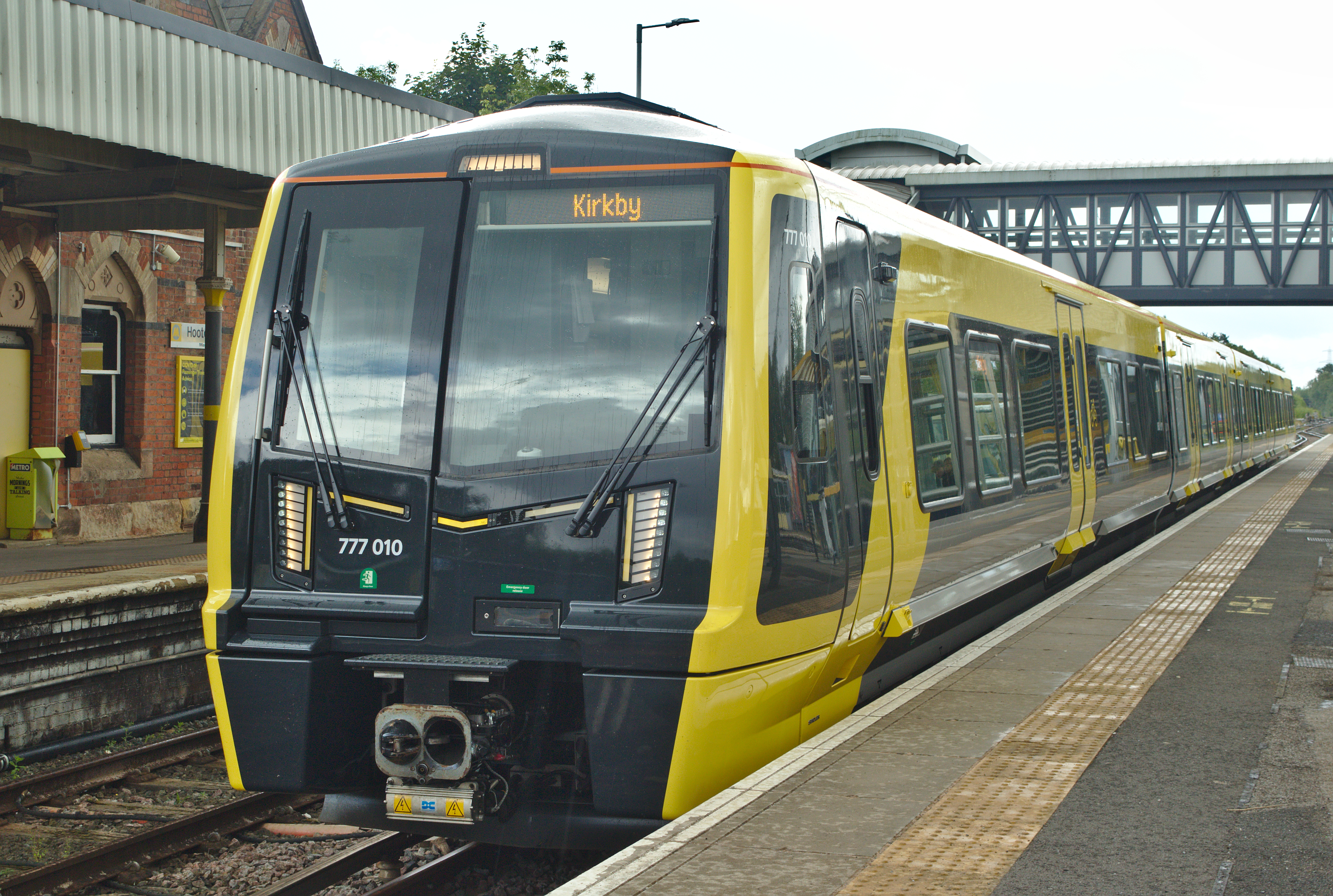
A Class 777 Merseyrail train in service on the Wirral line at Hooton

Liverpool Lime Street main line station is Merseyside's primary inter-city railway station, being used by 10.46 million passengers in 2021–22. Services are provided by Avanti West Coast, East Midlands Railway, London Northwestern Railway, Northern Trains, TransPennine Express and Transport for Wales; between them, they serve destinations across the UK.

Merseyrail is the county's urban rail system and is operated by Merseytravel, the combined passenger transport executive for the Liverpool City Region. The network has 66 stations on two lines; the Northern Line covers the centre of the county and the Wirral Line covers the eponymous peninsula. The two lines meet in Liverpool City Centre and Liverpool Central is the county's most-used station, with 10.75 million passengers in 2021–22. The network extends to Ormskirk in Lancashire, and Ellesmere Port and Chester in Cheshire. Merseytravel brands the network in the east of the county as the City Line, but the services on it are not operated by Merseyrail. The Borderlands line connects the west of the Wirral to Wales and is operated by Transport for Wales.

=== Maritime ===
Maritime Transport in Merseyside

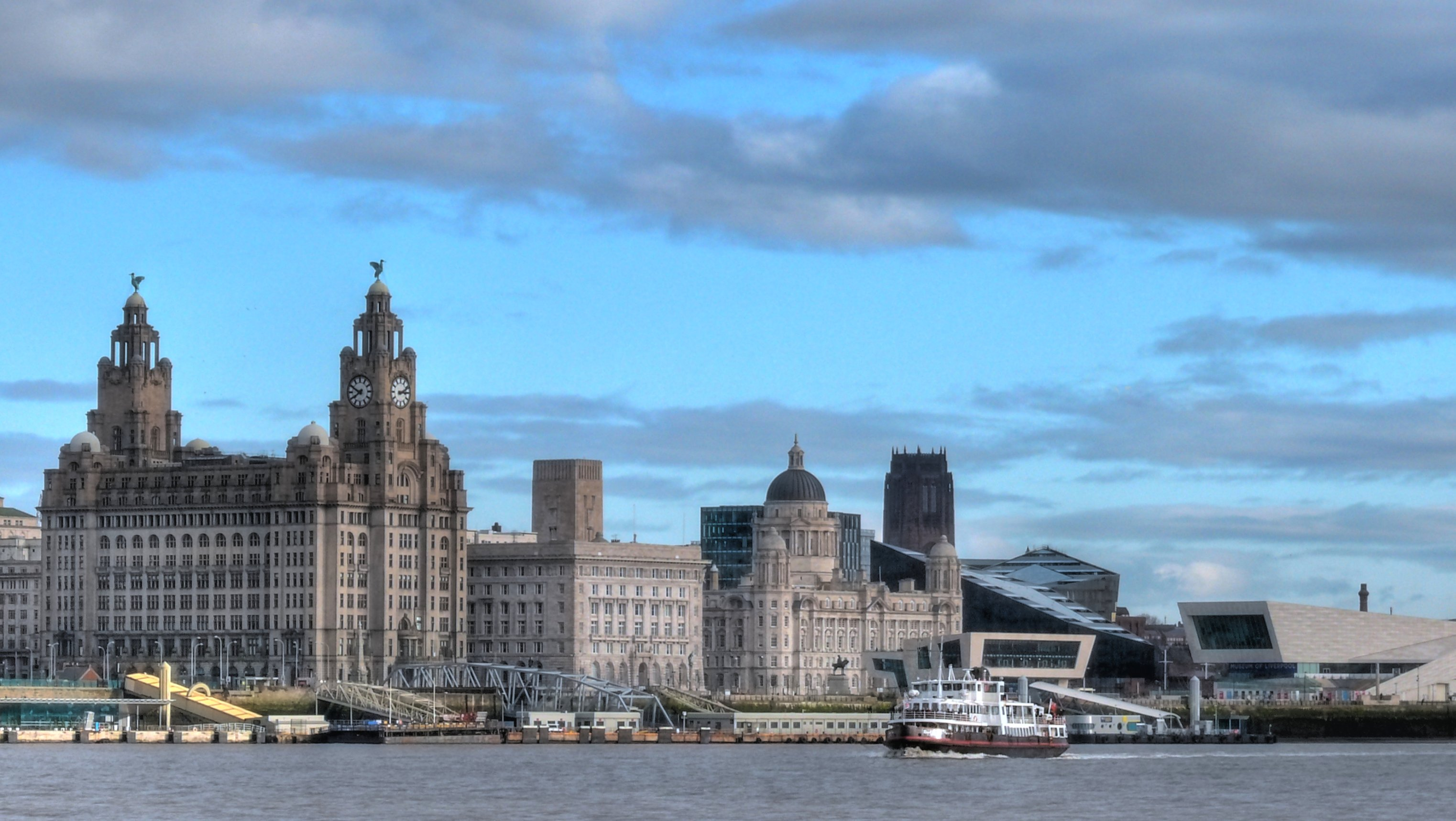
Liverpool Cruise Terminal, Pier Head and Mersey Ferry terminal

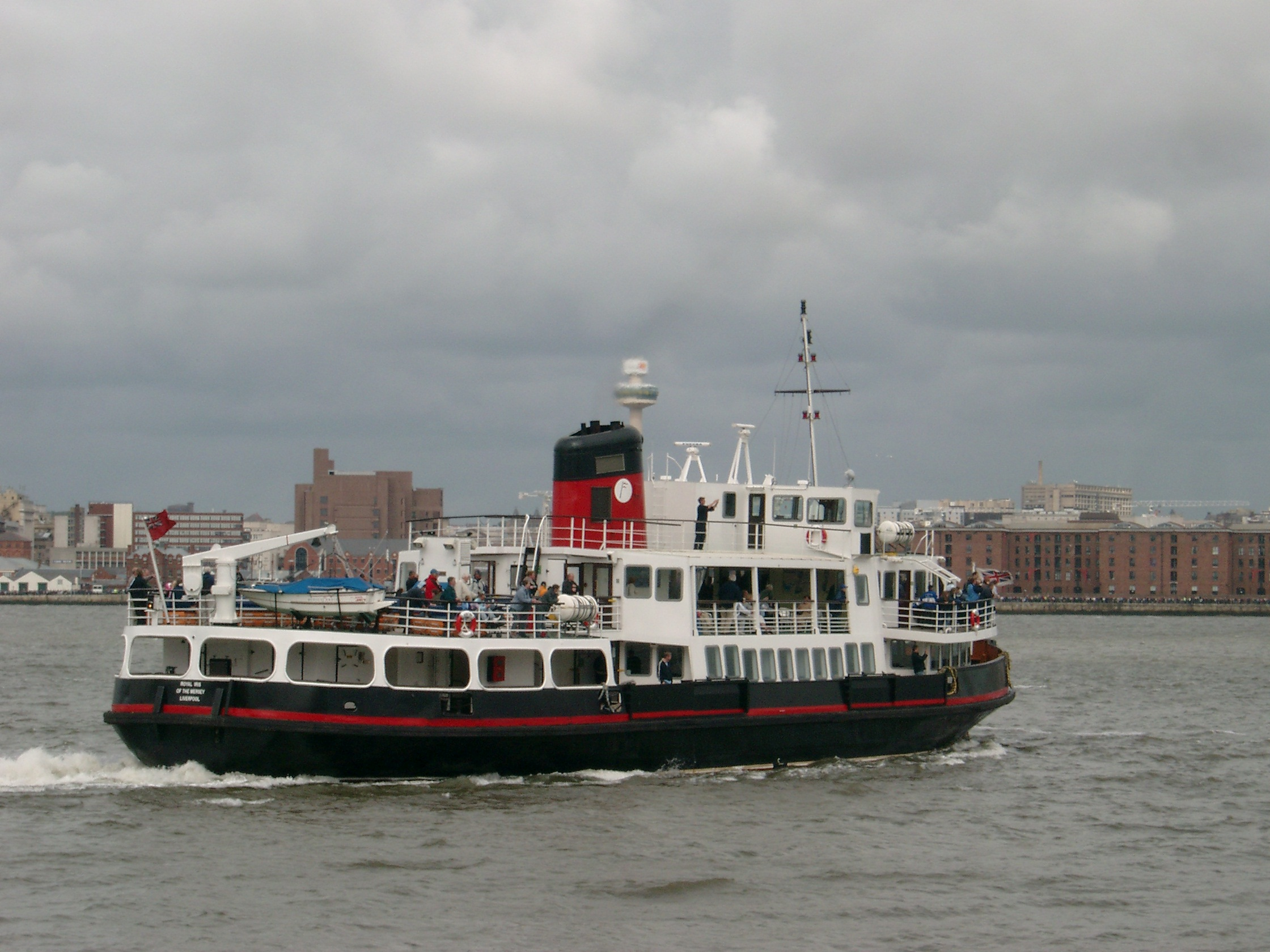
Mersey Ferry MV Royal Iris of the Mersey

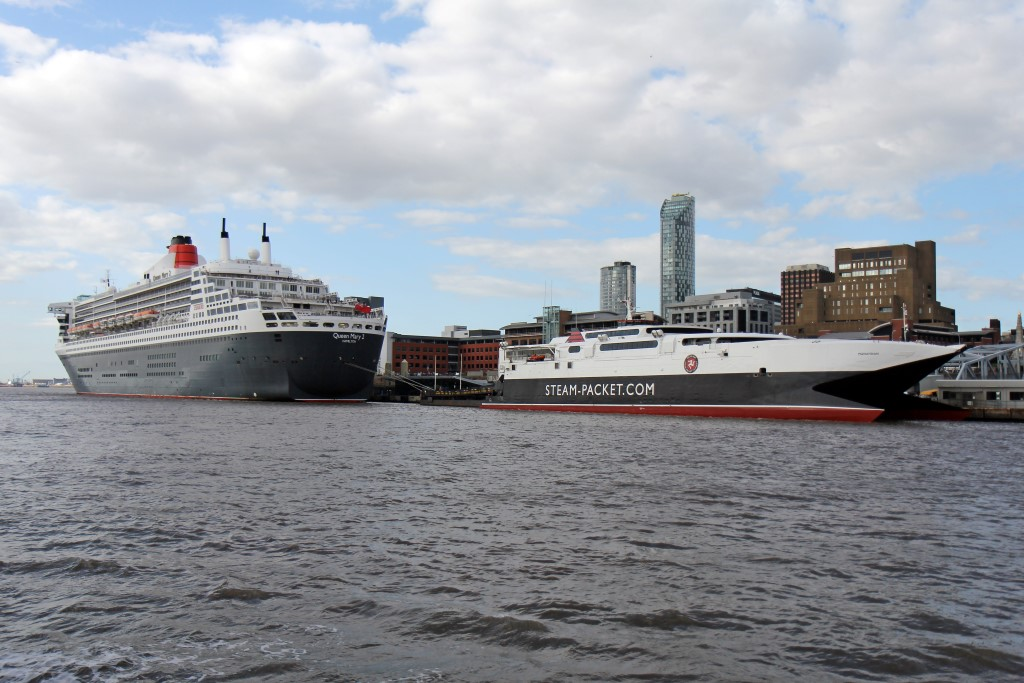
Queen Mary 2 with Isle of Man Steam Packet Company ferry HSC Manannan at Pier Head

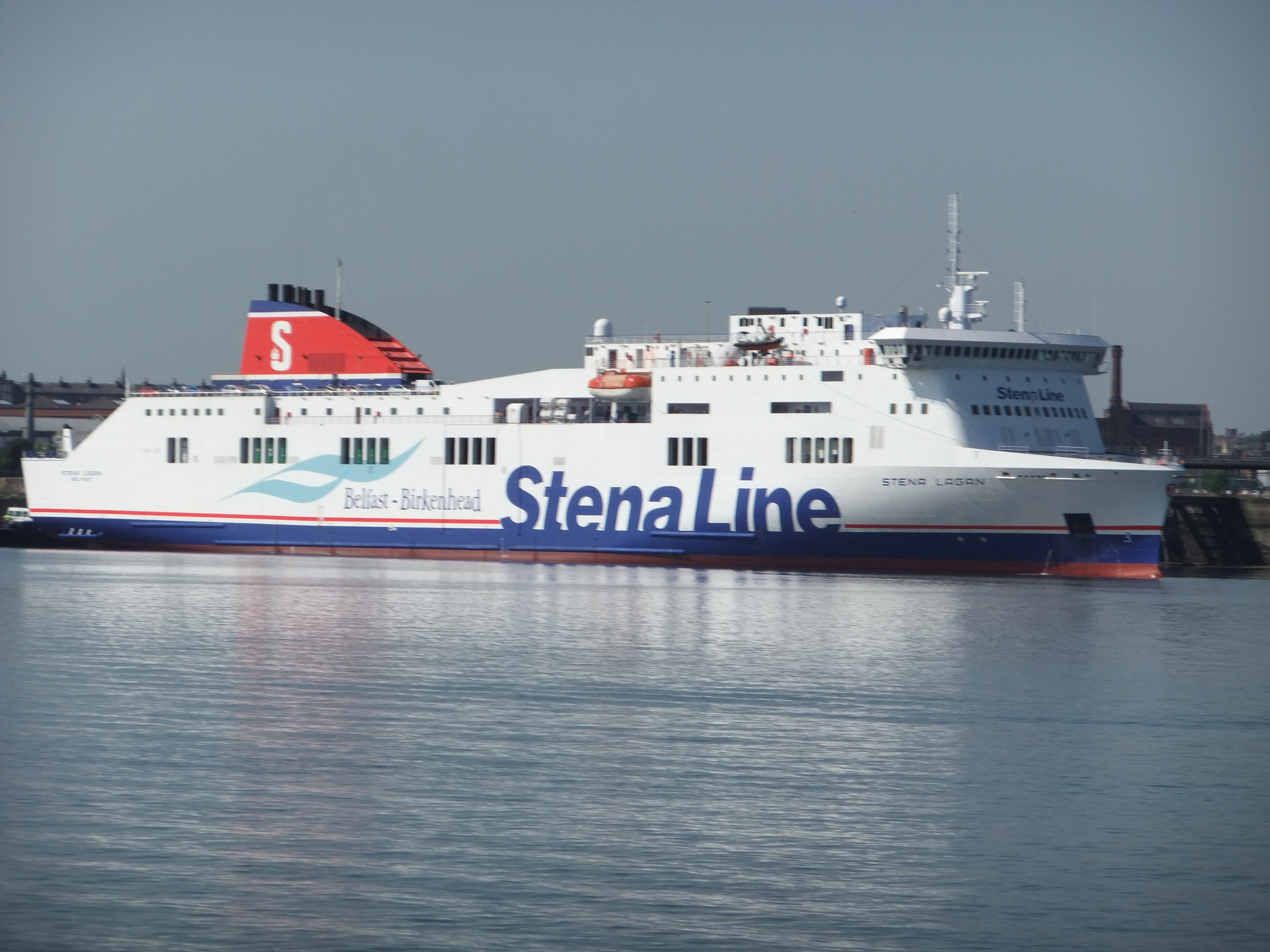
Twelve Quays Ferry Terminal, Birkenhead for Stena Line MS Stena Lagan services to Belfast, Northern Ireland

Routes operated by the Isle of Man Steam Packet Company

Liverpool Cruise Terminal provides facilities for long-distance passenger cruises. Fred. Olsen Cruise Lines MS Black Watch and Cruise & Maritime Voyages MS Magellan use the terminal to depart to Iceland, France, Spain and Norway. Peel Ports have also planned a second cruise terminal as part of the Liverpool Waters project.

==== Ferries ====
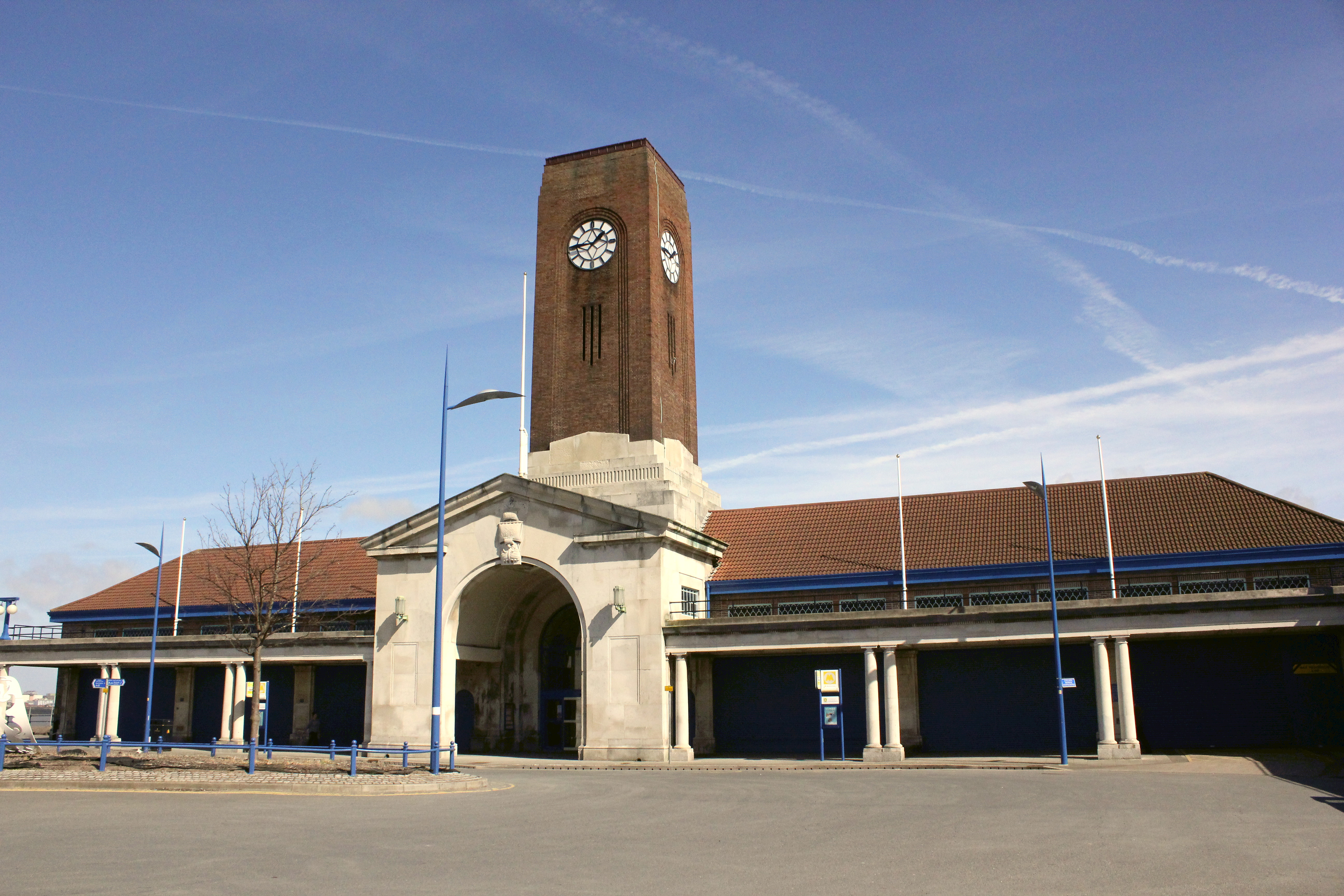
Seacombe Ferry Terminal

Prince's Landing Stage on Liverpool's Pier Head serves Isle of Man Steam Packet Company summer service to the Isle of Man (and Mersey Ferries). The Twelve Quays ferry port in Birkenhead serves winter Isle of Man ferry service and Stena Line services to Belfast, Northern Ireland. Almost three quarters of a million people travel these Irish Sea ferry services.

The Mersey Ferry has operated since the 1200s, currently between Wirral and Liverpool City Centre at Seacombe, Woodside and Liverpool Pier Head. In 2009–2010 it had 684,000 passengers using the service.

==== Commercial ====
The Port of Liverpool handles most commercial shipping, but the Birkenhead Docks complex in Great Float on the Wirral peninsula still handles some freight.

The Port of Liverpool is a container port that handles over 33 million tonnes of freight cargo per year, making it the fourth busiest port in the United Kingdom as of 2022. It serves more than 100 global destinations including Africa, Australia, China, India, the Middle East and South America. Imports include grain and animal feed, timber, steel, coal, cocoa, crude oil, edible oils and liquid chemicals; there are exports of scrap metal for recycling. A second container terminal, Liverpool2 at Seaforth, can handle Post-Panamax vessels and doubled the port's capacity when it opened in 2016.

=== Air ===
Liverpool John Lennon Airport is the county's international airport. It is in Speke, 6.5 miles (10.5 km) south-east of Liverpool city centre, with 5 million departures in 2020. Flights are primarily operated by easyJet and Ryanair, and over 70 destinations are served by the airport, including regular flights to the Near East and North Africa.

The airport is planning substantial expansion, and is forecast to handle more than 12 million passengers by 2030, as well as targeting permanent direct long haul flights and significantly larger terminal facilities.

== Sport ==
Merseyside is host to the football clubs Everton, Liverpool and Tranmere Rovers and several non-league football clubs including Marine A.F.C. and Southport F.C. The BrewDog Stadium hosts the St Helens Rugby League team, and Liverpool FC Women.

Golf courses include Royal Liverpool Golf Club, Royal Birkdale Golf Club, Hillside Golf Club and Southport and Ainsdale Golf Club. Cricket clubs include the historic Aigburth Cricket Ground. Aintree Motor Racing Circuit hosted the British Grand Prix biennially between 1955 and 1961, and finally in 1962.

Aintree Racecourse hosts the Grand National, alongside Haydock Park Racecourse, which hosts many other events. Hoylake hosts sailing (such as the Southport 24 Hour Race) and is Britain's premier location for sand yachting. A ski slope facility is found at The Oval (Wirral).

== Places of interest ==
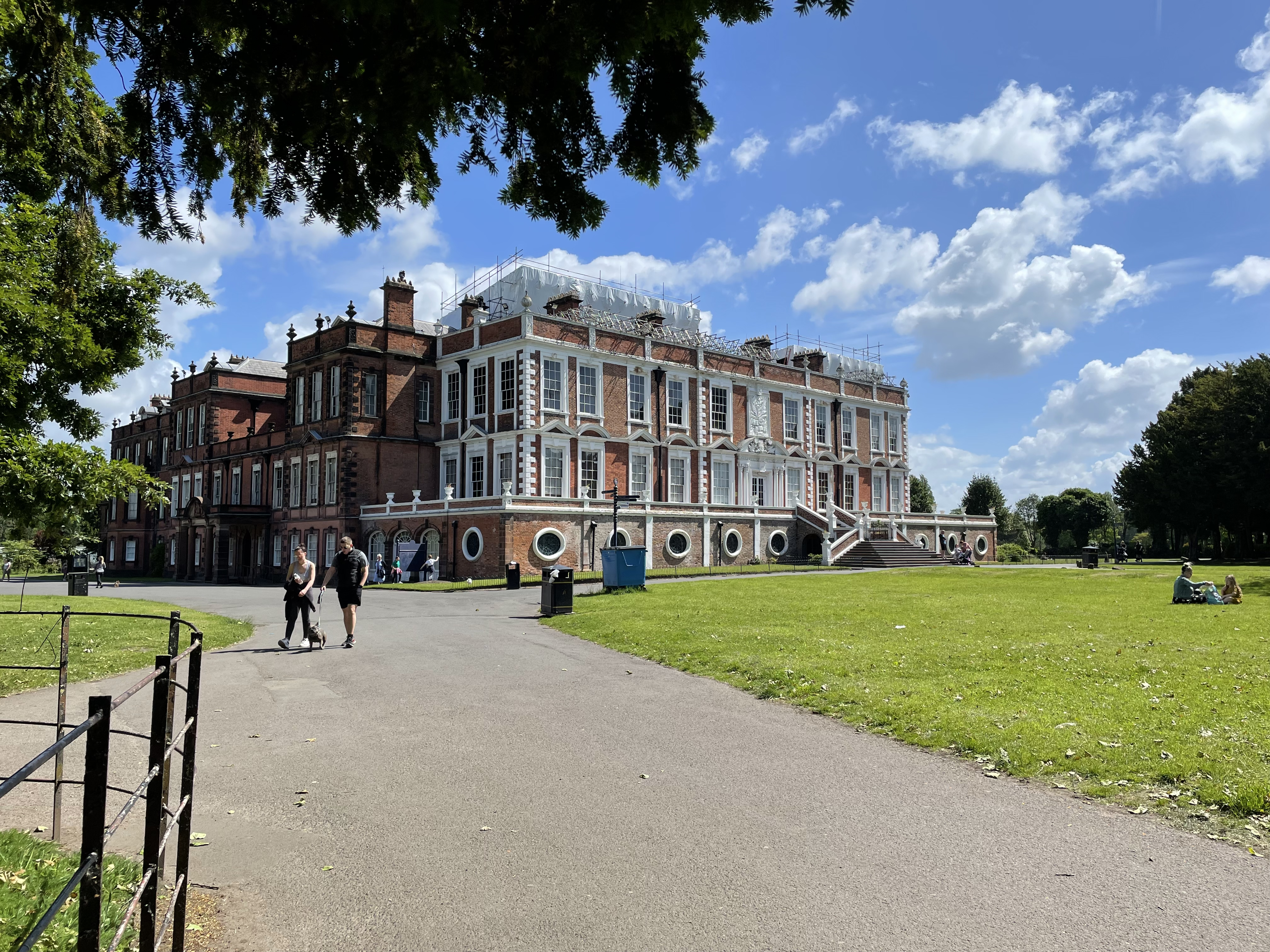
Croxteth Hall

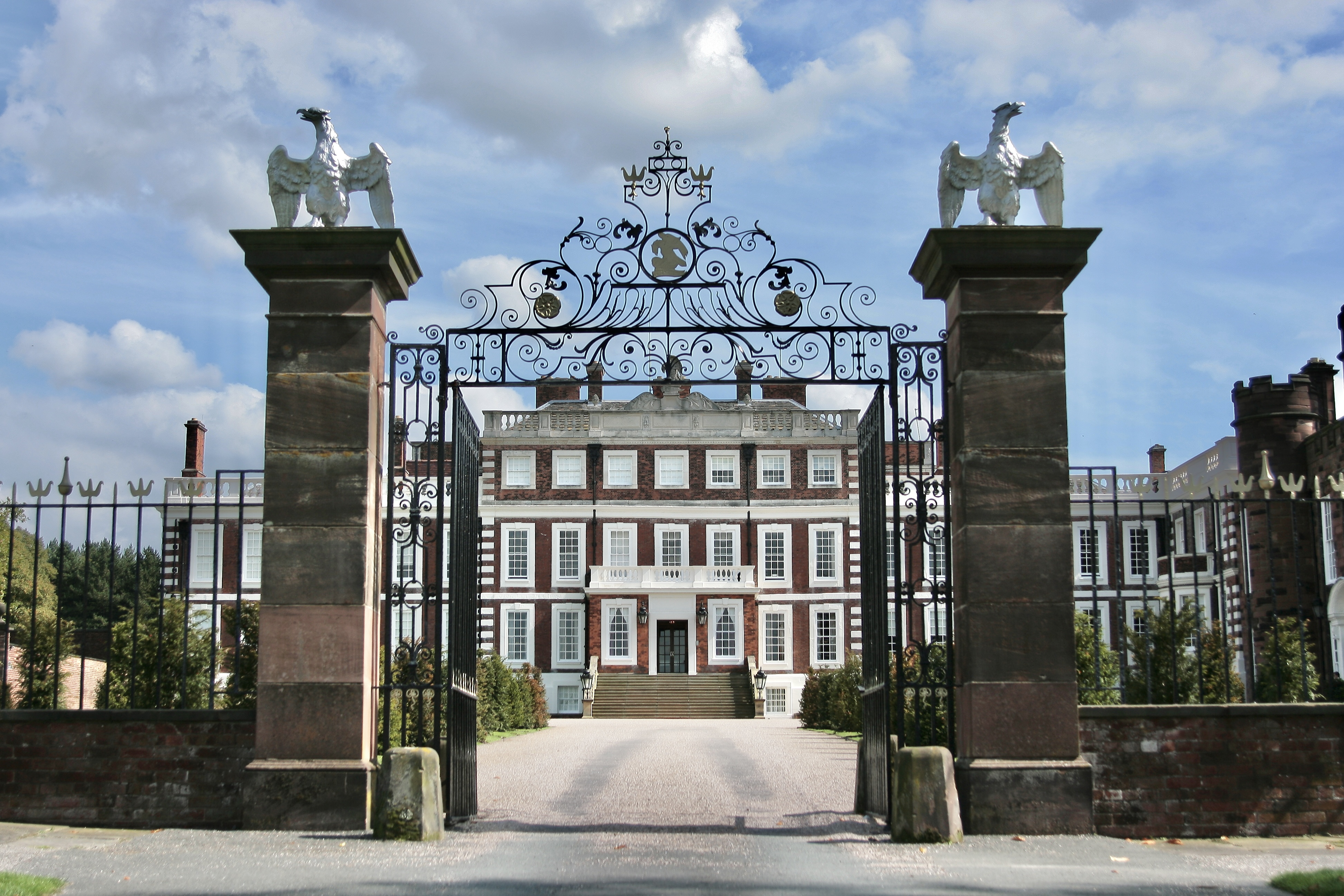
Knowsley Hall

=== Liverpool ===
- Albert Dock
- Anfield (Liverpool F.C. Stadium)
- The Beatles Story Museum Liverpool at Albert Dock
- The Cavern Club
- Chinatown, Liverpool
- Church of St Luke, Liverpool
- Croxteth Hall
- Everton Stadium
- Gambier Terrace
- Goodison Park (Everton F.C. Stadium)
- HM Customs & Excise National Museum
- International Slavery Museum
- Liverpool Cathedral (Anglican)
- Liverpool Empire Theatre
- Liverpool John Lennon Airport
- Liverpool Town Hall
- Liverpool Metropolitan Cathedral (Roman Catholic)
- Merseyside Maritime Museum
- Mersey Tunnels – Queensway and Kingsway
- Museum of Liverpool
- Pier Head
- Philharmonic Dining Rooms
- Philharmonic Hall, Liverpool
- Royal Liver Building
- Sefton Park
- Speke Hall – National Trust
- St George's Hall
- Tate Liverpool, a branch of the Tate Gallery
- Walker Art Gallery
- Western Approaches Museum
- World Museum Liverpool

=== Knowsley ===
- Knowsley Hall
- Knowsley Safari Park

=== St Helens ===
- The Dream
- Haydock Park Racecourse
- Totally Wicked Stadium (St Helens Stadium)
- North West Museum of Road Transport
- World of Glass

=== Sefton ===
- Aintree Racecourse – Home of the Grand National
- Atkinson Art Gallery and Library and Southport Arts Centre
- Bootle Town Hall – Captain Frederic John Walker exhibits
- British Lawnmower Museum, Southport
- Crosby Beach – Another Place (sculpture) by Antony Gormley
- Formby
- Haig Avenue – Southport F.C.
- Hesketh Park, Southport
- Hugh Baird College
- Lord Street, Southport
- Maghull – Home of Frank Hornby
- Marine A.F.C., Crosby
- Marshside RSPB reserve
- Meols Hall
- Pleasureland Southport
- RAF Woodvale
- Rimrose Valley Country Park
- Royal Birkdale Golf Club
- Seaforth Dock
- Sefton Coast – SSSI
- Southport Botanic Gardens
- Southport Flower Show
- Southport Pier
- St Helen's Church, Sefton – Grade I Listed Building

=== Wirral ===
- Bidston Hill and Bidston Windmill
- Birkenhead Park
- Birkenhead Priory
- Fort Perch Rock
- Hamilton Square
- Hilbre Island
- Lady Lever Art Gallery
- Leasowe Castle and Leasowe Lighthouse
- North Wirral Coastal Park
- Port Sunlight
- Prenton Park (Tranmere Rovers F.C. Stadium)
- Royal Liverpool Golf Club
- Williamson Art Gallery and Museum
- Wirral Country Park

== Notable people ==
See Category:People from Merseyside

== See also ==
- 1911 Liverpool general transport strike
- List of High Sheriffs of Merseyside
- List of commemorative plaques in Merseyside
- List of drill halls in Merseyside
- List of Sites of Special Scientific Interest in Merseyside
- List of Lord Lieutenants of Merseyside
- Mersey Barrage
- Merseyside derby
- Scheduled monuments in Merseyside
