= Rock Ferry =

Area of Birkenhead, Merseyside, England

Coordinates: 53.373°N 3.008°W

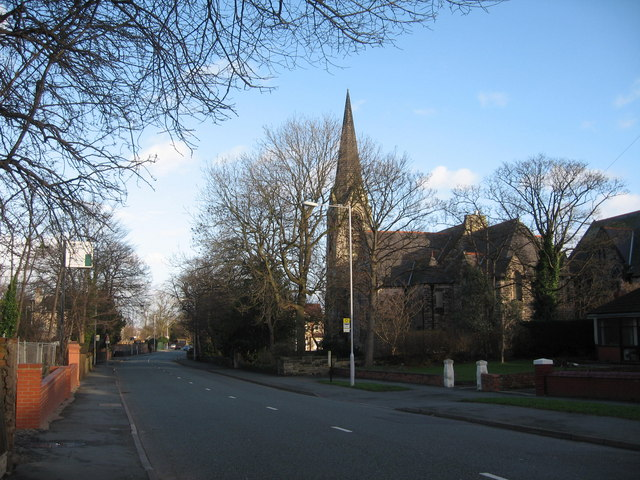
- Highfield Church in Rock Lane West

- Location within Merseyside
- Population: 14,298 (2011 census)
- OS grid reference: SJ330868
  - London: 177 mi (285 km) SE
- Metropolitan borough: Wirral
- Metropolitan county: Merseyside
- Region: North West
- Country: England
- Sovereign state: United Kingdom
- Post town: BIRKENHEAD
- Postcode district: CH41, CH42
- Dialling code: 0151
- ISO 3166 code: GB-WRL
- Police: Merseyside
- Fire: Merseyside
- Ambulance: North West
- UK Parliament: Birkenhead

Rock Ferry is an area of Birkenhead on the Wirral Peninsula, England. Administratively it is a ward of the Metropolitan Borough of Wirral. Before local government reorganisation on 1 April 1974, it was part of the county of Cheshire. At the 2011 census, the population was 14,298.

== History ==
There are references to a ferry as early as 1357. Ferry services were extended at the start of the 19th century, with steam ferries providing a faster, cheaper and more reliable service than had previously been allowed. By 1800 there was already an inn known as the Rock Ferry House, which was reputed to have been used by William IV as Duke of Clarence, hence the use of the term "Royal" for establishments such as the Royal Rock Hotel (the original inn, much enlarged in 1836) and the Royal Rock Beagles, set up in 1845. From the 1560s onwards Derby House, an occasional seat of the Minshull family, covered most of the grounds covered by present-day Rock Ferry. It was enlarged in 1834 to a design by Decimus Burton, who also laid out the first plans for the development of Rock Ferry. Thomas Oakshott, Mayor of Liverpool, lived there in the 19th century. The house, located on Rock Lane West close to the New Chester Road, was demolished in the 1930s.

In 1836 the Royal Rock Hotel was extended and a bath house was built. In the following years the area received an influx of luxurious villa housing, the villas of Rock Park and many other large houses around the Old Chester Road making Rock Ferry one of the most desirable addresses in the North West. Subsequently, even more substantial mansions were built for prosperous manufacturers, shipowners and merchants working in Liverpool, among which The Grange, The Manor House, Ravenswood, Saxonhurst, Thorncote, The Hursts, Westgarth, Larchwood and Stoneleigh. In the later part of the 19th century, Rock Ferry expanded due to the need to house the increasing population of workers, especially at Birkenhead's Cammell Laird shipyard, with more modest housing built as infill.

Rock Ferry was historically part of the parish of Bebington. It was incorporated into the municipal borough of Birkenhead in 1877. The Local Government Act 1894 said that parishes could no longer straddle borough boundaries, and so the part of Bebington parish within Birkenhead borough became a separate civil parish called Rock Ferry. The parish was short-lived, being abolished on 31 March 1898 when all the parishes within the borough of Birkenhead were united into a single parish.

In 1910, the Olympian Gardens were opened adjacent to the Royal Rock Hotel. These pleasure gardens were considered a great attraction and customers travelled from the whole of Wirral and, using the nearby ferry terminal, from Liverpool. The gardens hosted classical piano concerts and also slapstick comedy shows, with performers including Arthur Askey and Tommy Handley. At times the gardens held a prestige similar to the more famous Vauxhall Gardens in London. Shows were held in a large tent set amongst the trees and shrubs of land owned by Charles Boult. The gardens closed in the late 1920s after Mr Boult's death.

The decline of local industries in the early part of the 20th century took its toll. Rock Ferry's original wealthy inhabitants had for a long time been moving away from the area to areas such as Caldy or West Kirby. Many of the "big houses" of Rock Ferry were converted into flats or demolished to make way for new housing developments. This decline was reflected in the loss of the Royal Rock Hotel, as well as many of the shops in the Old Chester Road and Bedford Road; whereas before Bedford Road had supported a wine merchant, a jeweller, two tailors, three banks, and two bookshops, most shops stood vacant and Rock Ferry itself was viewed as a case study for urban decay. Large-scale regeneration work in the 1990s, which involved the demolition or restoration of many derelict properties, and the building of new housing, means that the area has improved considerably, although many buildings of considerable character have been lost.

As of 2022, a new £13 million park is being constructed which will link Rock Ferry with Bidston Dock. Known as Dock Branch Park, it will provide a mile–long pedestrian and cycle corridor between the two locations, as well as providing land for 1,000 homes and a new venue for Wirral Transport Museum.

== Geography ==
Rock Ferry is situated on the eastern side of the Wirral Peninsula, at the western side of the River Mersey. The area is approximately 8 km (5.0 mi) south-south-east of the Irish Sea at New Brighton and about 9 km (5.6 mi) east-north-east of the Dee Estuary at Heswall. Rock Ferry is at an elevation of between 0–30 m (0–98 ft) above sea level.

== Architecture and famous residents ==
The best-known part of Rock Ferry is Rock Park, on the banks of the River Mersey, an area of large Victorian villas of sandstone from Storeton quarry. In what was one of the first residential park developments in Britain, the houses were built between 1837 and 1850, and were the first early Victorian properties to be designated listed buildings. Despite the efforts of campaigners, including the Victorian Society, nine of the houses were demolished in the 1970s to make way for the New Ferry By-Pass (A41), including Hawthorne House, number 26, the former house of Nathaniel Hawthorne when he was consul to Liverpool in the 1850s. The property was subsequently owned by astronomer Isaac Roberts, who installed a seven-inch refractor in a revolving dome on the top floor. Immediately after the building of the bypass, the remainder of Rock Park was quickly designated a conservation area in 1979, although that year also saw the demolition of the Lodge, which had become derelict. Further losses came in the 1990s with the demolition of the original 1830s bathhouse on the Esplanade.

Other areas of architectural significance include Egerton Park, an oasis of late nineteenth-century villas in a leafy setting, and the Byrne Avenue Baths, a 1930s swimming pool with plenty of Art Deco features, which closed in February 2009. The row of semi-detached houses on Rockville Street, built in 1837, is one of the earliest rows of private houses in Britain to use Gothic detailing on their exteriors, while St Anne's Catholic Church on Highfield Road was designed by E. W. Pugin. The writer May Sinclair was born at Thorncote, a large house that stood between Rock Park and The Dell. F. E. Smith, later Earl of Birkenhead, also briefly lived in a house on Green Lawn. Former Australian Premier Sir Charles Gavan Duffy lived at Rose Cottage, which still stands on Rockville Street, where his son, Irish politician George Gavan Duffy, was born in 1882. Ravenswood, a Gothic Revival house which had formed the nucleus of Rock Ferry High School, one of the last standing Rock Ferry merchant mansions, was listed in 2012 to prevent further deterioration.

Highfield United Reformed Church, completed in 1871, is a sizeable place of worship within Rock Ferry and a Grade II Listed building.

== Ferry service and shipping ==
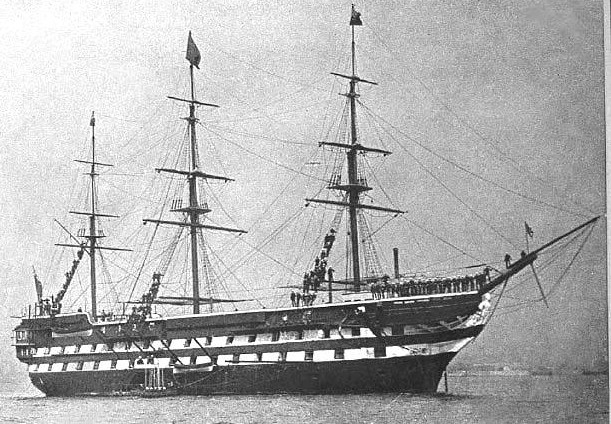
HMS Conway at Rock Ferry

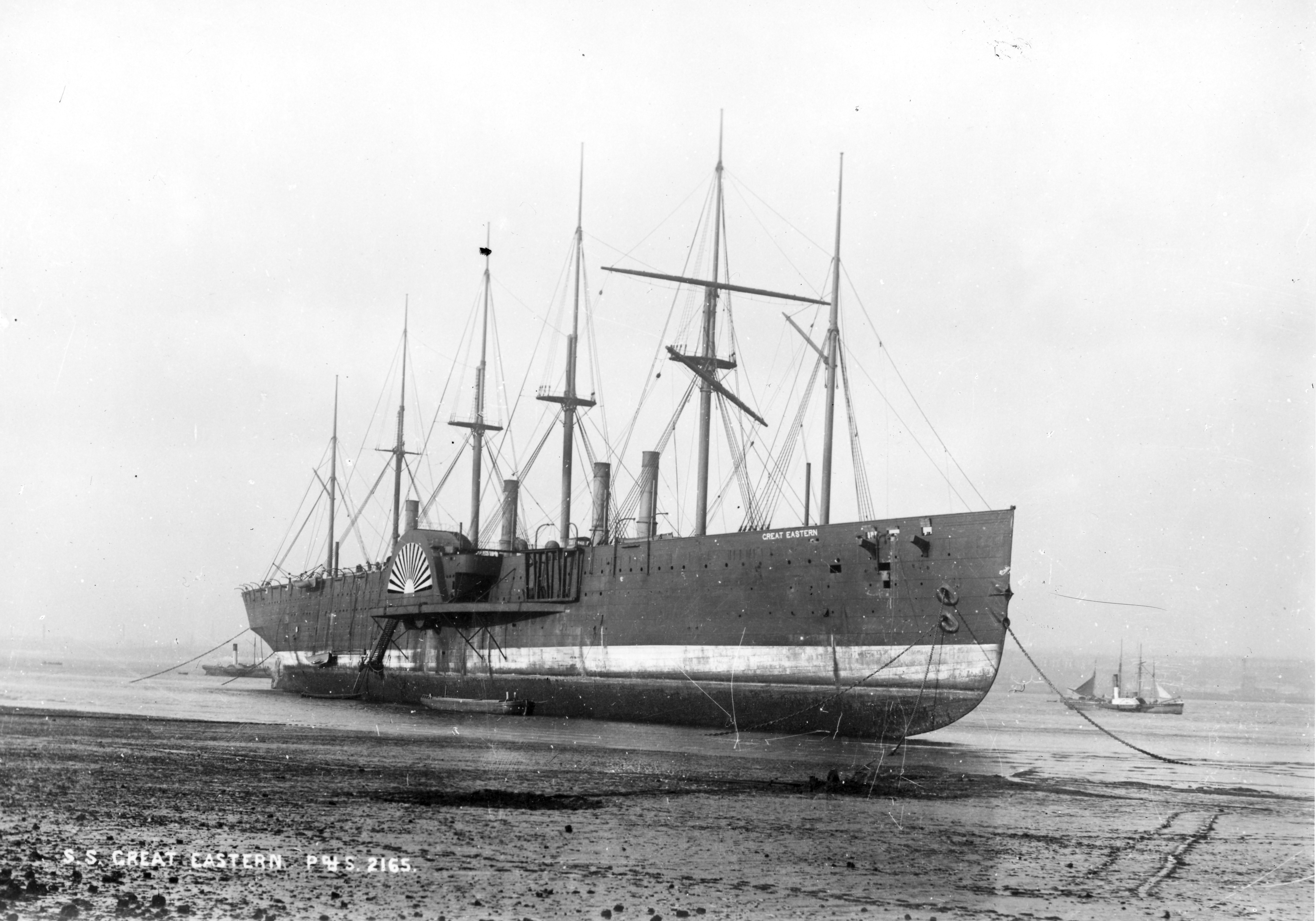
SS Great Eastern beached to be broken up.

There are records of a ferry service from Rock Ferry pier to Liverpool from 1709 onwards, until being discontinued on 30 June 1939. The ferry landing stage was removed in 1957 and the terminal building demolished. The pier became part of Tranmere Oil Terminal and modified for use as a berth for tanker cleaning and degreasing. It has since fallen into disuse and become very dilapidated. A stone slipway originally used by the ferry service also remains.

The Royal Mersey Yacht Club was founded at a meeting held in the Mersey Hotel, Old Church Yard, Liverpool on 26 July 1844. The club opened the doors of its present premises in Bedford Road, Rock Ferry, on 31 May 1901.

Rock Ferry was home to a number of boat builders including the yard of Samuel Bond and the Enterprise Small Craft Company. Between 1906 and 1935 both yards built Royal Mersey Restricted Class boats, including Mefanwy and Phyllis.

Bonds built many boats including Mersey Canoes.

Enterprise built a number of notable boats. Among these were 11 Seabird Half Rater one design sailing yachts in 1924, Robinetta and Fairwind in 1937 and 18 Hilbre One Design craft between 1959 and 1962.

The Naval training school vessels HMS Conway and TS Indefatigable were moored at the Sloyne, in the River Mersey, between Rock Ferry and New Ferry. These were ships converted for the purpose of training boys for a life at sea. During the nineteenth century, the reformatory ships Akbar and Clarence were also moored there. In the early years of the Second World War, both the Conway and Indefatigable were moved from the Mersey to avoid damage.

Isambard Kingdom Brunel's SS Great Eastern was beached at New Ferry for breaking up in 1889, which took eighteen months to complete.

== Transport ==
Rock Ferry railway station is on the Wirral Line of the Merseyrail commuter rail network. Regular underground services (6 trains per hour) operate northbound cross-river to Liverpool via Birkenhead and surface services southbound to Chester (every 15 minutes) and Ellesmere Port (every 30 minutes). Until 1985, when electrification was extended to Hooton, the station was a terminus for Wirral Line services.

There are also several scheduled bus routes that run along New Chester Road into Birkenhead and central Liverpool

The first municipal motorbus transport started at from Rock Ferry Pier on 12 July 1919. It had been planned to commence a bus service from here in 1914 when the Tramways Committee hired a London bus and spent a day touring the Wirral and in particular Moreton Shore, but this proved impossible because of the outbreak of World War One. The first bus service ran to Duke Street (Park Station) and a month later the service was extended to Moreton. Birkenhead Corporation Transport department continued to expand and completely replaced the municipal 1901 electric tramway system in 1937. By 1969 the Corporation fleet of buses totalled 225 and up until the early years of the 1960s has made a profit. The profit was used to keep the General Rates down for the Birkenhead rate payers. On 1 December 1969 the fifty year old bus operation of the corporation was amalgamated with the fleets of Wallasey and Liverpool to become Merseyside Passenger Transport Executive.

== Education ==
The area was previously served by Rock Ferry High School, which became an Associate College of Liverpool Institute for Performing Arts (LIPA) from 2006. The school closed in January 2011, merging with Park High School to form University Academy Birkenhead (now Birkenhead Park School). The nearest secondary schools are Bebington High Sports College, Wirral Grammar School for Boys, Wirral Grammar School for Girls and St John Plessington Catholic College, all of which are in Bebington.

Rock Ferry also has many local primary schools, such as Rock Ferry Primary, St Anne's Primary and Well Lane Primary. The Dell Primary School closed in 2006 and has since been demolished.

== Cultural references ==
Liverpool band Deaf School released the song Rock Ferry on their 1977 album Don't Stop the World.

Welsh singer Duffy revealed that her debut single "Rockferry", released in the UK in 2007, and the album of the same name, were named after Rock Ferry. She said, "My dad grew up there and I used to visit my grandparents as a kid. My nan still lives there now. It's a really nice place and I love everything about it, so I thought it was only right I remembered it somehow through my music."

Rock Ferry is mentioned in the song "This One's for Now" by the band Half Man Half Biscuit on their 2014 album Urge for Offal.

== See also ==
- Listed buildings in Rock Ferry
