= David Mather =

David Mather may refer to:

- Mysterious Dave Mather, American lawman, gunfighter, and occasional criminal
- David Mather (cricketer), English cricketer

== See also ==
- David Mathers (disambiguation)
