= Wirral Grammar =

Wirral Grammar may refer to:

- Wirral Grammar School for Boys, England
- Wirral Grammar School for Girls, England
