= 1946 Bebington Municipal Borough Council election =

1946 UK local government election

The 1946 Bebington Municipal Borough Council election took place in 1946 to elect members of Bebington Municipal Borough Council in England.

After the election, the composition of the council was:

Party	Seats	±
Conservative	?	?
Labour	?	?
Residents	?	?
Independent	?	?
Ex-service	?	?
Ind. Conservative	?	?

== Election results ==
=== Overall election result ===
Overall result compared with 1945.

Bebington Municipal Borough Council election results, 1946
Party	Candidates						Votes		
Party	Stood	Elected	Gained	Unseated	Net	% of total	%	No.	Net %
Conservative	9	5	?	?	?	43.3	40.9	7,240	▲27.5
Labour	12	4	?	?	?	33.3	37.3	6,613	▼1.1
Residents	2	2	?	?	?	20.0	10.9	1,927	▼7.7
Independent	2	1	?	?	?	3.3	8.5	1,503	▲6.4
Liberal	1	0	?	?	?	0.0	2.0	349	New
Communist	1	0	?	?	?	0.0	0.4	74	New

(Note: % of total refers to % of wards won.)

== Ward results ==
=== Eastham ===
Eastham
Party	Candidate	Votes	%	±%
Residents	T. Jarman	1,025	68.6	▲10.1
Labour	W. Walker	470	31.4	▲2.5
Majority		555	37.2	▲7.5
Registered electors		3,545		
Residents hold		Swing	▲3.8	

=== Higher Bebington ===
Higher Bebington
Party	Candidate	Votes	%	±%
Conservative	W. Jones	1,219	60.7	▲7.2
Independent	S. Williams	430	21.4	New
Labour	F. Starkey	358	17.8	▼10.1
Majority		789	39.3	▲13.6
Registered electors		3,679		
Conservative hold		Swing	▲6.9	

=== Lower Bebington ===
Lower Bebington
Party	Candidate	Votes	%	±%
Conservative	S. Williams	996	62.6	▲32.1
Labour	T. Greens	595	37.4	▲5.3
Majority		401	25.2	N/A
Registered electors		3,532		
Conservative gain from ?		Swing	▲13.4	

=== New Ferry ===
New Ferry
Party	Candidate	Votes	%	±%
Labour	W. Whiteside	854	65.6	▼12.0
Conservative	R. Frankman	448	34.4	New
Majority		406	31.2	▼23.9
Registered electors		3,272		
Labour gain from ?		Swing	▼12.0	

=== North Bromborough ===
North Bromborough
Party	Candidate	Votes	%	±%
Conservative	C. Kilburn (Note: Compared with Ind. Conservative.)	757	54.4	▲23.0
Labour	S. Littlewood	561	40.3	▲13.0
Communist	R. Burrows	74	5.3	New
Majority		196	14.1	▲10.0
Registered electors		3,038		
Conservative gain from Labour		Swing	▲5.0	

=== Park ===
Park
Party	Candidate	Votes	%	±%
Labour	L. Birch	782	52.2	▲13.3
Conservative	T. Dodd	715	47.8	▲2.4
Majority		67	4.4	N/A
Registered electors		3,237		
Labour gain from ?		Swing	▲5.5	

=== Poulton ===
Poulton
Party	Candidate	Votes	%	±%
Residents	C. Griffith	902	69.1	▲21.5
Labour	H. Davies	403	30.9	▲2.7
Majority		499	38.2	▲18.8
Registered electors		3,045		
Residents gain from ?		Swing	▲9.4	

=== South Bromborough ===
South Bromborough (3)
Party	Candidate	Votes	%	±%
Independent	J. Dodd (Note: Elected to serve a 4-year term.)	1,073	35.6	New
Conservative	J. Dixey (Note: Elected to serve a 3-year term.)	977	32.5	New
Labour	R. Gill (Note: Elected to serve a 1-year term.)	960	31.9	▼18.1
Conservative	A. Noel	923	–	–
Labour	F. Lover	830	–	–
Labour	J. Engle	741	–	–
Majority		96	3.1	N/A
Registered electors		3,540		
Independent gain from ?		Swing	▲1.6	
Conservative gain from Ex-service		Swing	–	
Labour gain from ?		Swing	–	

=== Sunlight ===
Sunlight
Party	Candidate	Votes	%	±%
Labour	J. Robey	861	50.0	▲2.5
Conservative	F. Statham	860	50.0	New
Majority		1	0.0	N/A
Registered electors		3,222		
Labour gain from ?		Swing	▲2.5	

=== Woodhey ===
Woodhey
Party	Candidate	Votes	%	±%
Conservative	J. Trench	1,268	53.1	▲7.0
Labour	E. McNee	769	32.2	▼11.9
Liberal	H. Audas	349	14.6	New
Majority		499	20.9	▲18.9
Registered electors		4,566		
Conservative gain from ?		Swing	▲9.5	

== Notes ==
• italics denote a sitting councillor • bold denotes the winning candidate
