= St Mary's College, Wallasey =

Coordinates: 53.425°N 3.064°W

St Mary's Catholic College ... A Voluntary Aided Academy

Location
- Wallasey Village; Wallasey, Merseyside, CH45 3LN; England

Information
- Type: Academy (since November 2016)
- Motto: Christ Within Us All - Aspire Not To Have More But To be More - Archbishop Romero
- Religious affiliation: Roman Catholic
- Established: 1972
- Department for Education URN: 143554 Tables
- Ofsted: Reports
- Head teacher: Kevin Maddocks
- Gender: Co-educational
- Age: 11 to 18
- Enrolment: 1,309
- Colours: Primarily blue with a yellow badge. Years 7–10 each have a different colour of the school motto written on the badge: Year 7 - red Year 8 - blue Year 9 - purple Year 10 - green
- Website: stmaryswallasey.com

St Mary's Catholic College (SMC) is a Roman Catholic secondary school and sixth form with academy status in Wallasey, Wirral, in North West England. St Mary's is one of four Catholic secondary schools in the Metropolitan Borough of Wirral. The others are St Anselm's College, St John Plessington Catholic College and Upton Hall School FCJ. St Mary's Catholic College (SMC) is part of St John Plessington Catholic College (SJP) and works in close relationship to further both schools.

== Campus ==
From 2002 to 2004, a £12.5 million building programme took place at St. Mary's. This almost doubled the accommodation size of the whole school. This enabled the school to comfortably deal with rising pupil numbers. The building programme also addressed all of the accommodation shortfalls highlighted in the Ofsted report of March 2002.

In April 2003, the Science and Technology Building opened, along with a new school chapel, extended library, Sixth form common room and study base, extra classrooms and two computer resource bases.

In May 2004, the new Arts Block was opened, in time for the school to become a Specialist College for the Arts in September. There were two new drama studios, a fully equipped dance studio, three art rooms, two new computer rooms and five additional classrooms. The Music Department now has its own recording studio and soundproof practice rooms.

The buildings include 19 classrooms (16 general and 3 Design and Technology), larger PE changing rooms, expanded and upgraded office/reception areas, improved access for students with limited mobility, three refurbished laboratories, and more dining room space.

The current buildings' capacity can accommodate up to 1,850 students. Eight forms of entry and an anticipated sixth form roll of 300 +.

In 2018 the school removed a wall in front of the girls' toilets to cut down on juvenile delinquency; in response parents pulled their children out of school and complained.

== Significant events ==
On 1 December 2011, students from St. Mary's College were invited to perform for HM The Queen and HM The Duke of Edinburgh when they officially opened the Floral Pavilion in New Brighton.

On 1 November 2016, St Mary's Catholic College became an academy.

== Notable former pupils ==
- Timothy Brown (bassist) (b. 1969), bassist with The Boo Radleys.
- Michelle Butterly (b. 1969), actress.
- Martin Carr (b. 1968), chief songwriter and lead guitarist with The Boo Radleys.
- Louise Delamere (b. 1974), actress.
- Jonathan Walters (b. 1983), Premiership footballer.
- Ken Sloan (b. 1972), Vice-Chancellor of Harper Adams University
