= New Ferry =

Urban area in Merseyside, England

Coordinates: 53.360°N 2.997°W

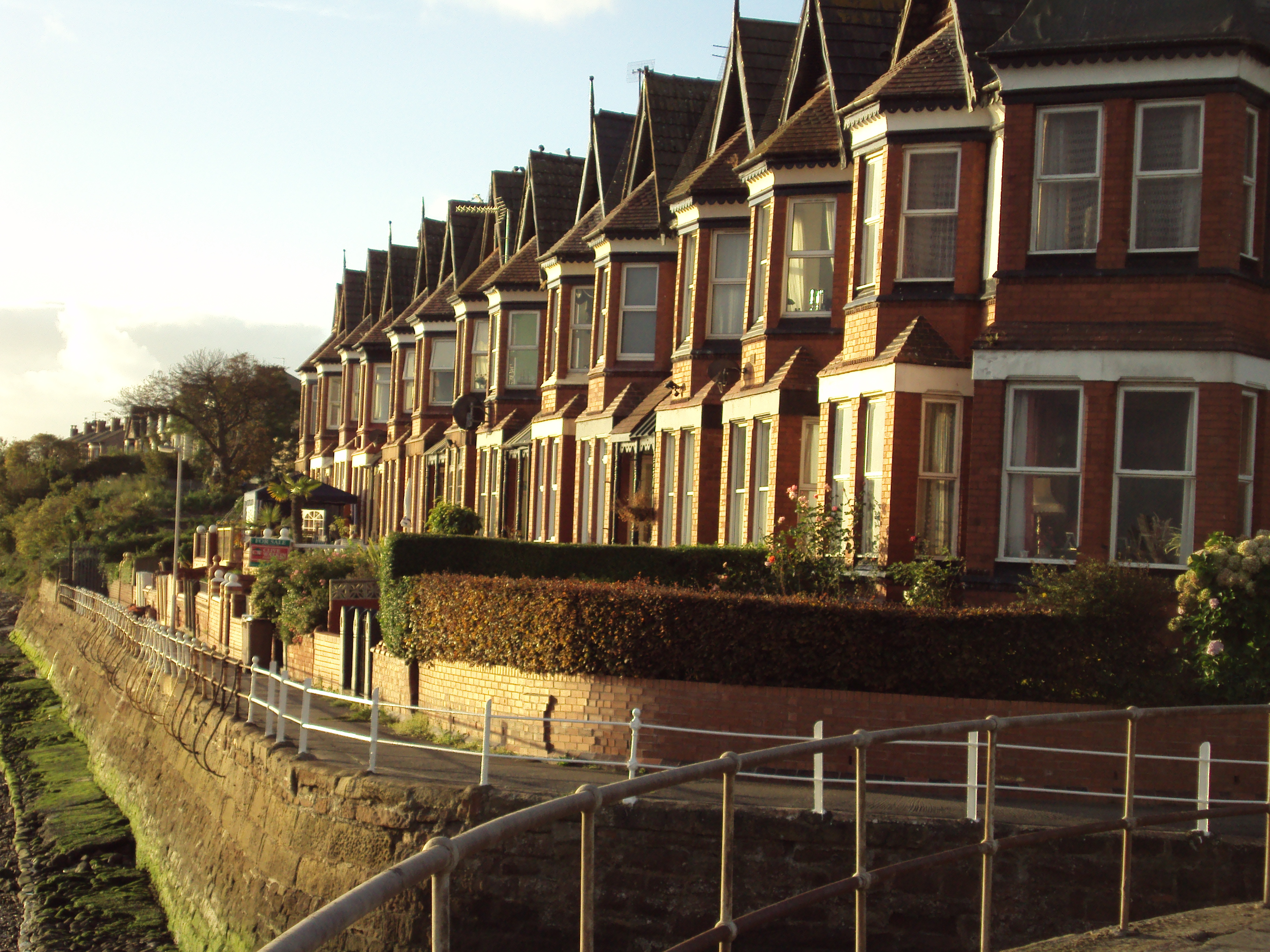
- Houses on The Esplanade, New Ferry

- Location within Merseyside
- Population: 5,300 (2001 census)
- OS grid reference: SJ337853
  - London: 176 mi (283 km) SE
- Metropolitan borough: Metropolitan Borough of Wirral
- Metropolitan county: Merseyside
- Region: North West
- Country: England
- Sovereign state: United Kingdom
- Post town: WIRRAL
- Postcode district: CH62
- Dialling code: 0151
- ISO 3166 code: GB-WRL
- Police: Merseyside
- Fire: Merseyside
- Ambulance: North West
- UK Parliament: Ellesmere Port and Bromborough

New Ferry is an urban area on the Metropolitan Borough of Wirral, Merseyside, England. It is located on the Wirral Peninsula, with the River Mersey to the east, the town of Bebington to the west, Bromborough to the south and Rock Ferry to the north. Within the boundaries of the historic county of Cheshire, the area was developed from the early nineteenth century.

The 2001 census measured the population at 5,300.

== History ==
As with the neighbouring settlement of Rock Ferry to the north-west, a ferry service gave its name to the locality: the first recorded mention of New Ferry was in 1774. On 4 April 1865, a "South End" service was established between New Ferry and South Ferry Basin in the southern dock system of Liverpool, although this appears to have been relatively short-lived. From 1879, services to Liverpool Pier Head were usually augmented with Rock Ferry. The ferry service was forced to close after a ship collided with New Ferry Pier in thick fog, in the early hours of 30 January 1922. Declining passenger numbers, improved local land-based public transport and a close proximity to the Rock Ferry service meant that it never reopened. The lease on the ferry rights officially expired on 22 September 1927, although no service had operated at New Ferry for over five years as a result of the collision.

New Ferry was part of the Lower Bebington township, which became the Bebington-cum-Bromborough civil parish in 1922. Between 1894 and 1974 these parishes were administered as part of Bebington urban district. On 1 April 1974, local government reorganisation in England and Wales resulted in most of Wirral, including New Ferry, being transferred from the county of Cheshire to Merseyside.

On 25 March 2017, Pascal Blasio, a local furniture shop owner, intentionally left a gas valve on in the building causing a gas explosion, harming 81 people and leaving one man with life-changing injuries. Blasio was found guilty of the attack and sentenced to 20 years in prison.

== Geography ==
New Ferry is on the eastern side of the Wirral Peninsula, on the western bank of the River Mersey. The area is approximately 9 km (5.6 mi) south-south-east of the Irish Sea at New Brighton and about 10 km (6.2 mi) east-north-east of the Dee Estuary at Heswall. The area lies at an elevation of between 0–27 m (0–89 ft) above sea level.

== Transport ==
New Ferry is on the A41, the main road between Birkenhead and London before the introduction of motorways, and immediately adjacent to the village of Port Sunlight. At the centre of the town is the Toll Bar area, a name originating from when New Chester Road used to be a toll road. The re-routing of the A41 road onto the New Ferry By-pass, the first part from Bolton Road to Thorburn Road built in 1960, and extended from Thorburn Road to the Tranmere roundabout in 1976, has resulted in a decline in through-traffic in the town centre.

The nearest railway stations to New Ferry are Bebington and Port Sunlight, where trains operate to Chester, Ellesmere Port and Liverpool Central on the Wirral Line of the Merseyrail network.

New Ferry is served by several bus services: Arriva, Stagecoach and Merseylink all operate through the town en route to destinations such as Chester and Liverpool.

== Governance ==
New Ferry is within the parliamentary constituency of Ellesmere Port and Bromborough.

At local government level, the town is incorporated into the Bromborough Ward of the Metropolitan Borough of Wirral, in the metropolitan county of Merseyside. It is represented on Wirral Metropolitan Borough Council by three councillors.

== Community ==
The community-led New Ferry Residents Association (NeFRA) has been actively seeking funding for a variety of projects since its inception in 1999. As well as successfully campaigning to get CCTV cameras around the shopping centre; the main car parks resurfaced; environmental improvements within Winstanley Road and Salisbury Drive; new pavings, railings and lighting in New Chester Road; and starting up the successful Wirral Farmers' Market in the Village Hall, the group has more recently carried out improvements to the Shorefields Nature Park where further improvements are also imminent. The group was also very active in discussions with waste operator Biffa and the Forestry Commission regarding turning the nearby former tip site at Bromborough Dock into a new park, the Port Sunlight River Park, which opened in 2014.

=== Shopping ===
New Ferry has a small shopping precinct often referred to as "The Ferry". The area used to have a few chain stores as well as many independent shops. Kwik Save had two small premises in the town before moving to one new purpose-built site in 1992, which was then taken over by the Somerfield supermarket chain in 1998. The Kwik Save name was retained until 2006 before rebranding as Somerfield. After the Co-operative Group acquired the Somerfield chain in 2009, the New Ferry store was rebranded again. This supermarket finally closed in May 2016.

Numerous smaller retailers include: the Discount Carpet Centre, a 20-year-old family business; Buckleys newsagents, which has been in business under the same owner since the early 1980s. The Buckley family have also been prominent in New Ferry since the early 1800s, when they used to own and run most of the buildings dotted around. Buckleys newsagents was taken over in 2013, and is now a convenience store with an off-licence. For a small shopping centre it is unusual in having four butcher's shops: reputedly the oldest on Wirral is Edge's, with the same family trading in New Ferry since it opened in the 1850s and a recipient of the 'Best Local Retailer' in BBC's national Food and Farming Awards in 2014. The other butchers include G H Pearson's Pork Butchers in New Ferry Road and D E Griffiths (Butchers) Ltd in Bebington Road. The latter was severely damaged in the explosion of 2017 leading to closure.

The Wirral Farmers' Market, held in New Ferry's Village Hall (between Longfellow Drive & Grove Street) on the second Saturday of the month, received a UK National Regeneration Award from the British Urban Regeneration Association in 2005 for its work investing in the local community. It was also awarded the title of Britain's Best Farmers' Market in 2007 from the national BBC Food & Farming Awards. The market is run entirely by volunteers, its profits being used to fund local community groups and good causes.

New Ferry also had three major banks. These were National Westminster Bank, more commonly known as NatWest, which closed in 1993 and HSBC, formerly Midland Bank, which closed in the late 2000s. The third bank was the Trustee Savings Bank (TSB), which, due to a merger with Lloyds Bank in 1995, became Lloyds TSB and later due to new banking regulations demerged and the branch was rebranded as Lloyds Bank. The New Ferry branch closed in late July 2016.

=== 2017 explosion ===
At 9:15 pm on 25 March 2017, there was a huge explosion, destroying the large modern building at the junction of the shopping precinct with Boundary Road. Eighty one people were injured on the night, two of them seriously. The building that was destroyed housed a furniture shop, dance studio, charity shop and funeral service but had previously been used by the employment services. Over 200 surrounding buildings, both commercial and residential, were also significantly damaged and residents had to move to temporary accommodation. Businesses directly affected by the blast included DE Griffiths butchers, Ming Yuan beauty parlour, PK McMullen opticians, Lan's House Chinese restaurant, Amelia Jane (florist), the Cleveland Arms and several vacant shop units. The cause of the explosion was investigated by the police, Health and Safety Executive, National Grid and Merseyside Fire and Rescue Service. In 2019 Pascal Blasio, a business man who leased the furniture shop in the destroyed building, Homes in Style, was convicted of causing an explosion to endanger life and dishonestly making a false representation. He was sentenced to 20 years and eight years in jail, to run concurrently. Blasio died whilst in the custody of HM Prison Rochester on 28 February 2026, just short of nine years following the blast.

After the incident, the Conservative government refused to provide any funding as a result of the explosion, causing anger amongst the local community.

In September 2017, demolition of some of the most badly damaged buildings began. In addition a public consultation promoted by Wirral Council on redevelopment of New Ferry began. In 2020, a regeneration plan was decided by Wirral Council. It was for up to 1000 square metres of retail space and 79 houses or flats. The plan is for the explosion site, an area opposite it where damaged shops and houses had been demolished and also an adjacent large car-park flanked by derelict buildings.

In April 2020, Wirral Council applied for funding to regenerate New Ferry from the government's Future High Streets fund. In December 2020 it was announced that New Ferry was provisionally awarded £3.2 million from the government's fund, aimed at recovery from effects of the Covid19 pandemic and regenerate underused town centres.

=== Public houses and clubs ===
The area is home to several pubs including Shillings Bar, The Cleveland Arms and the Wirral Hotel.

The John Masefield is named in honour of a former poet laureate, who was briefly stationed on a training ship on the Mersey near New Ferry. Part of the JD Wetherspoon chain, the company received complaints due to the unfortunate resemblance of the Masefield portrait on the pub sign to Adolf Hitler. As a result, it has received the nickname of "The Bünker" or "Adolf's". The company had said it would consider renaming the pub, but this has not happened to date.

New Ferry also has a number of private members' clubs: The Ex Civil Defence Club in School Lane and The Bebington Liberal Club on Bebington Road. The latter building was sold and redeveloped in 2020 as a business centre to provide co-working space and offices. In addition there was a club of the Royal British Legion at Hesketh Hall on Boundary Road until 2010, when it closed and the building was converted into 14 one- and two-bedroom apartments in 2014.

One of New Ferry's links with its historic past as a tourist resort between the 1860s and 1920s was the Great Eastern Pub. The building dated from 1862 when Liverpool day-trippers began crossing the River Mersey by ferry to New Ferry Pier when it became known as "The Great Eastern Picnic Hotel". By coincidence, in 1888, Isambard Kingdom Brunel's famous ship the SS Great Eastern was broken up on the nearby shoreline, and many artefacts from the ship were auctioned off as it was being dismantled. The pub's owner bought a number of these including the ship's bar to install into the building, wood panelling for the walls, the ship's wheel and a stained glass window. These were all removed by the last owners of the building in the mid-2000s, and the pub closed down in 2007. In November 2009 the site was sold to a housing developer, Worksharp Ecohomes Ltd of Southport, who, in February 2010, submitted a planning application to Wirral Borough Council to demolish the building, described as being "in a state of serious disrepair" and replace it with ten two-storey semi-detached houses. On 5 March 2010, the security screens were ripped off the doors and windows, the contents of the pub removed and the building left unsecured. Many members of the community had been concerned that the motive behind this was to accelerate the pub's derelict state and ensure its future demolition. This process began in June 2010, ahead of a site meeting by Wirral Council's planning committee and despite an online petition by New Ferry Residents Association to save the building. More than 400 people had signed the petition demanding that it be saved from the bulldozer and instead converted to housing. Worksharp EcoHomes obtained planning permission to replace the building with ten semi-detached homes, but conditions attached to the permission required them to provide a permanent memorial explaining the significance of the area and its connection with the SS Great Eastern. Work finally began on building the replacement houses in March 2013.

== Education ==
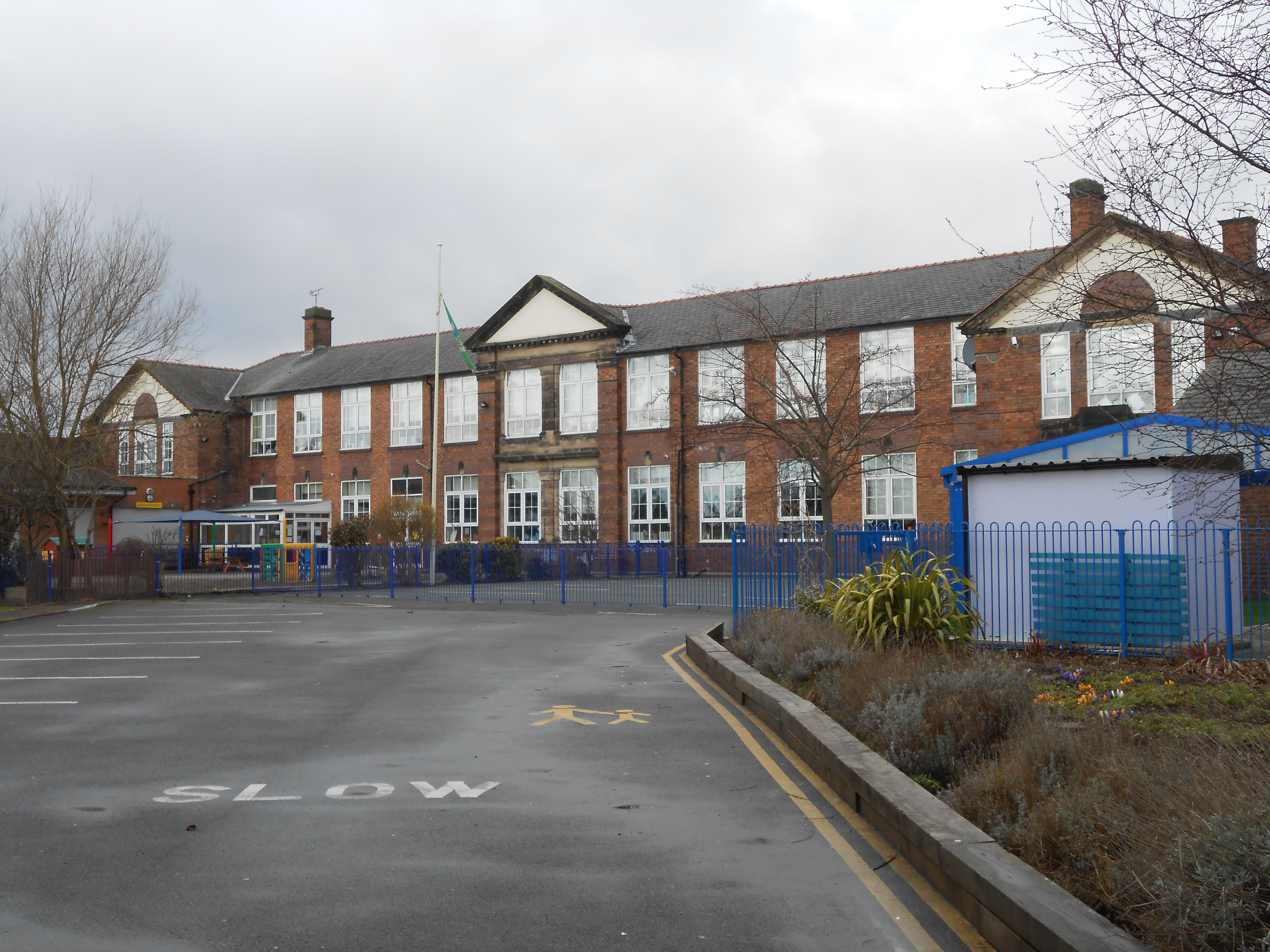
Grove Street Primary School, New Ferry

Primary schools in the New Ferry area include Grove Street Primary School, Church Drive School, Port Sunlight and St Johns RC Primary. Secondary schools in the New Ferry area also include Co-op Academy Bebington, St John Plessington Catholic College, The former site of New Ferry market has been turned into a Learning Centre, offering opportunities for young people and adults to further their qualifications.

== Parks and open spaces ==
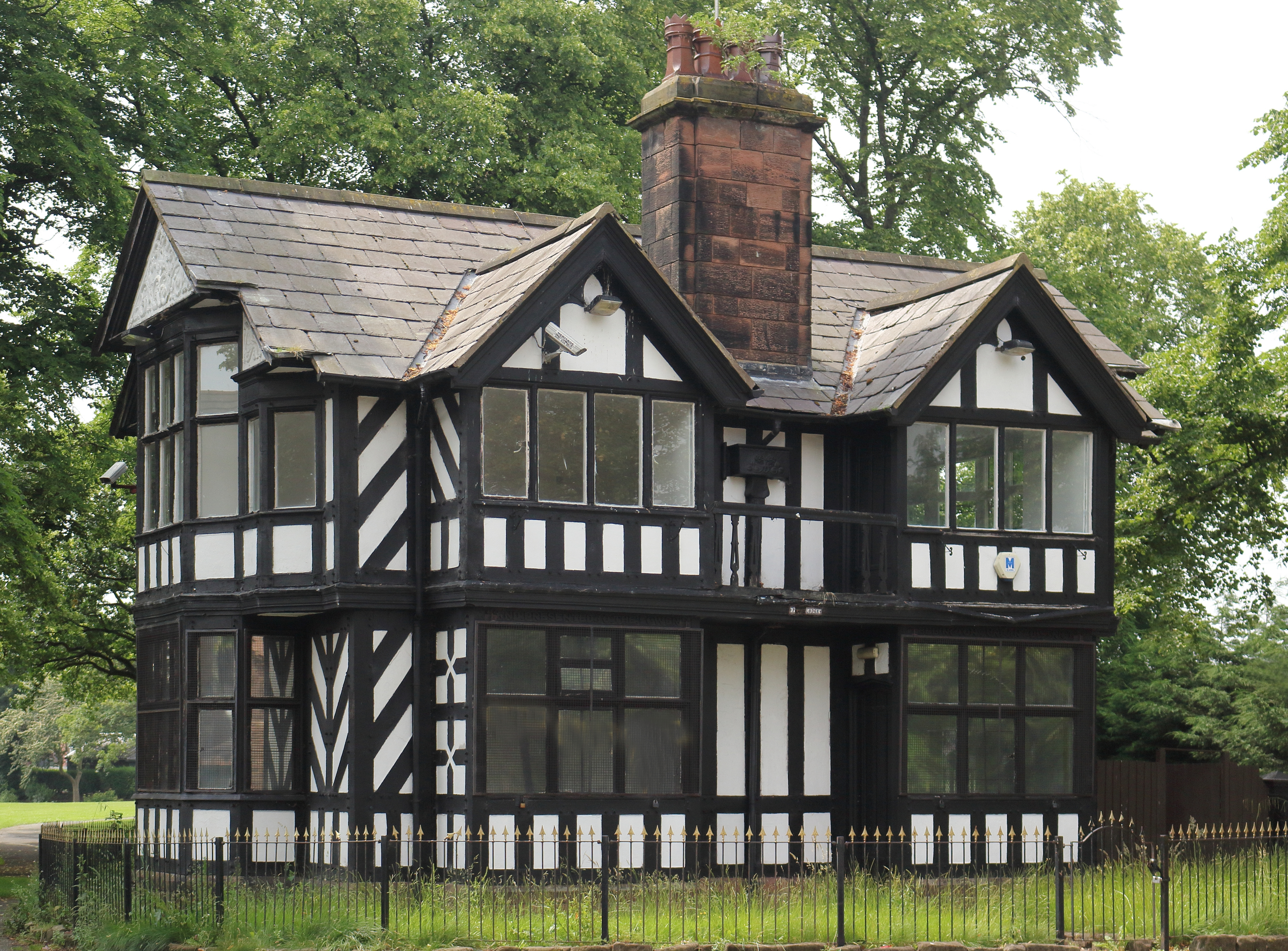
The lodge of New Ferry Park was given by Lord Leverhulme in 1903 and is, at Grade II, the only listed building in New Ferry

Facilities at New Ferry Park include a play area for children (refurbished and extended in January 2010) and football pitches, which are often used during local amateur Sunday league matches. In early 2012, the football clubs obtained £60,000 to refurbish the changing pavilion in the centre of the park.

Shorefields Nature Park on the banks of the River Mersey is a winter bird haven designated as a Site of Special Scientific Interest.

=== New Ferry Butterfly Park ===
Out of a thin piece of land adjoining Bebington railway station and along the railway towards Birkenhead, local volunteers have, since 1993, created a wildlife haven, New Ferry Butterfly Park. Occupying an area of almost 5 hectares, the Park is designated as an Area of Special Biological Interest. Open to visitors on Summer Sundays, local volunteers provide tours and help to manage the site throughout the year.

In December 2009, it was announced that the site's owners, Brock plc, wished to sell the land - it is believed for development, even though the site is zoned as open space by the local authority. Brock have refused to sell the site to Cheshire Wildlife Trust or to Wirral Borough Council. As a result of the 3,600 named petition by local residents and concerned persons across Europe, in January 2010 the Council agreed to issue a Compulsory Purchase Order (CPO) on Brock to force them to sell the land to them so that this much loved ecological resource can be saved for future generations.

During 2010, artist-in-residence Carol Ramsay created an art trail within the Butterfly Park. The trail now contains work by many more artists. In 2012 an Empty Shop Project funded by Wirral Council allowed the Butterfly Park to move into the town centre for six months, with 6 artist residencies each encouraging community engagement. The shop was formally opened by Harriet Harman MP. The legacy of this project is that 2 more sculptures were added to the art trail, an interactive information board/artwork is in situ and a book has been published about it all. New Ferry Butterfly Park was awarded official Green Flag status for 2013/14. On Sunday 4 May 2014 the Lord Lieutenant of Merseyside, Dame Lorna Muirhead, officially raised the flag and opened the park for the summer season.

=== Port Sunlight River Park ===
On the shore of the Rivery Mersey, between New Ferry and Bromborough, the former landfill site at Bromborough Dock was turned into a new £2.3 million community park. Now known as Port Sunlight River Park, it opened in summer 2014. The park now provides visitors with a number of distinct experiences including a freshwater lake which is rich in wildlife and other new habitats, a scenic waterfront, a perimeter walk, a link to Shorefields Nature Park, and paths to the summit with views of the River Mersey estuary and Liverpool skyline.

== Sport ==
New Ferry Rangers Football Club are a local amateur football club, who play their home matches at New Ferry Park on Sunday mornings.

The Olympic Taekwondo Centre is based at Bebington Youth Club, Cornwell Close. In 2008 the coach won Wirral Sports Council 'Coach of the Year' and the club took the Junior -73 kg male British National Champion title for the second year running.

New Ferry is the home of Bebington Youth Centre. In late 2012, Wirral Borough Council proposed to close the youth club (amongst many across the borough as the result of significant budgetary problems). However, the proposals were heavily opposed by the community who came together and signed a petition with over 1700 signatures to save the centre. As a result, and the fact that the centre is one of the best attended in the borough, the Council dropped proposals for its closure in early 2013.

== Gallery ==
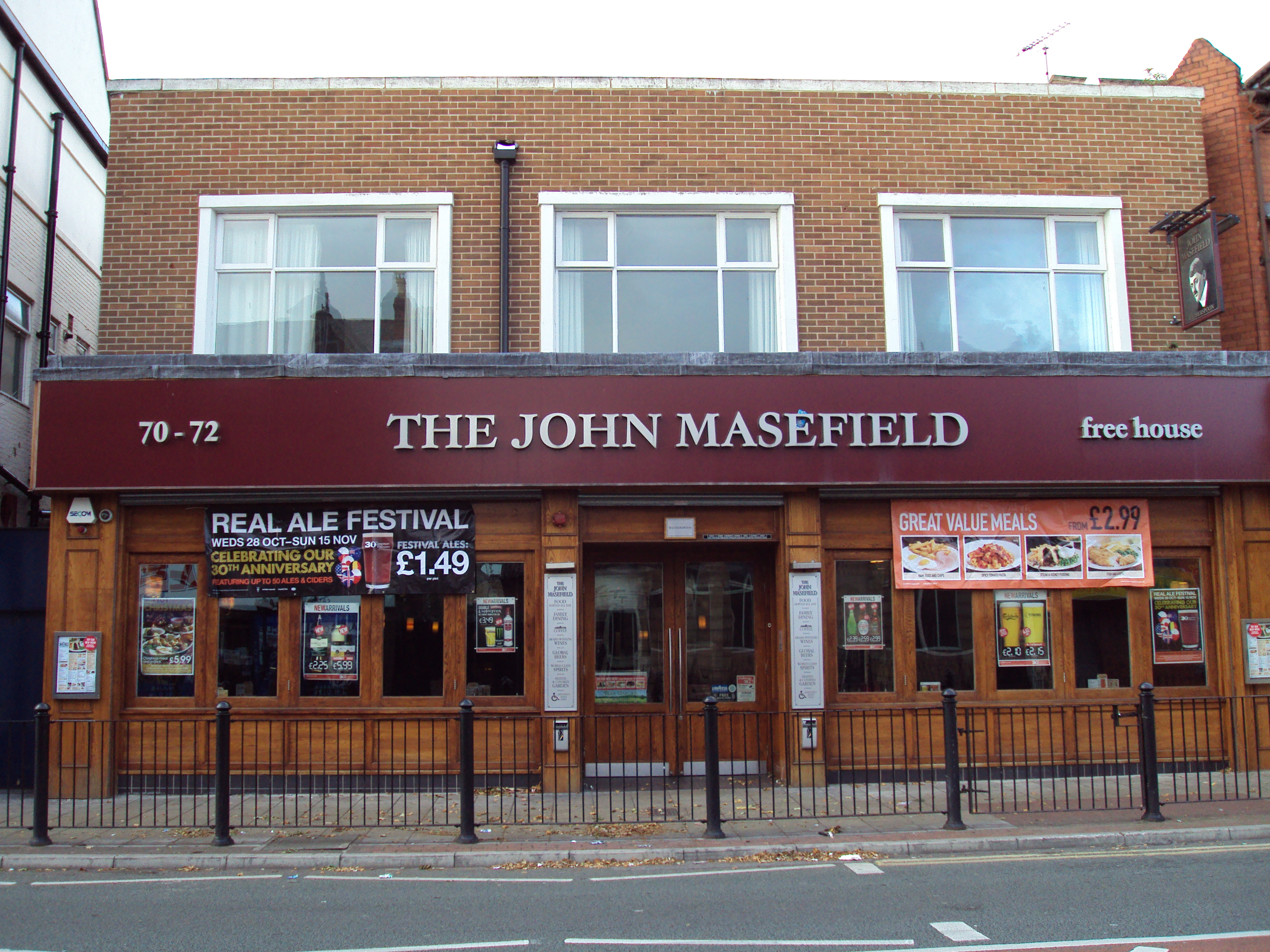
Local restaurant

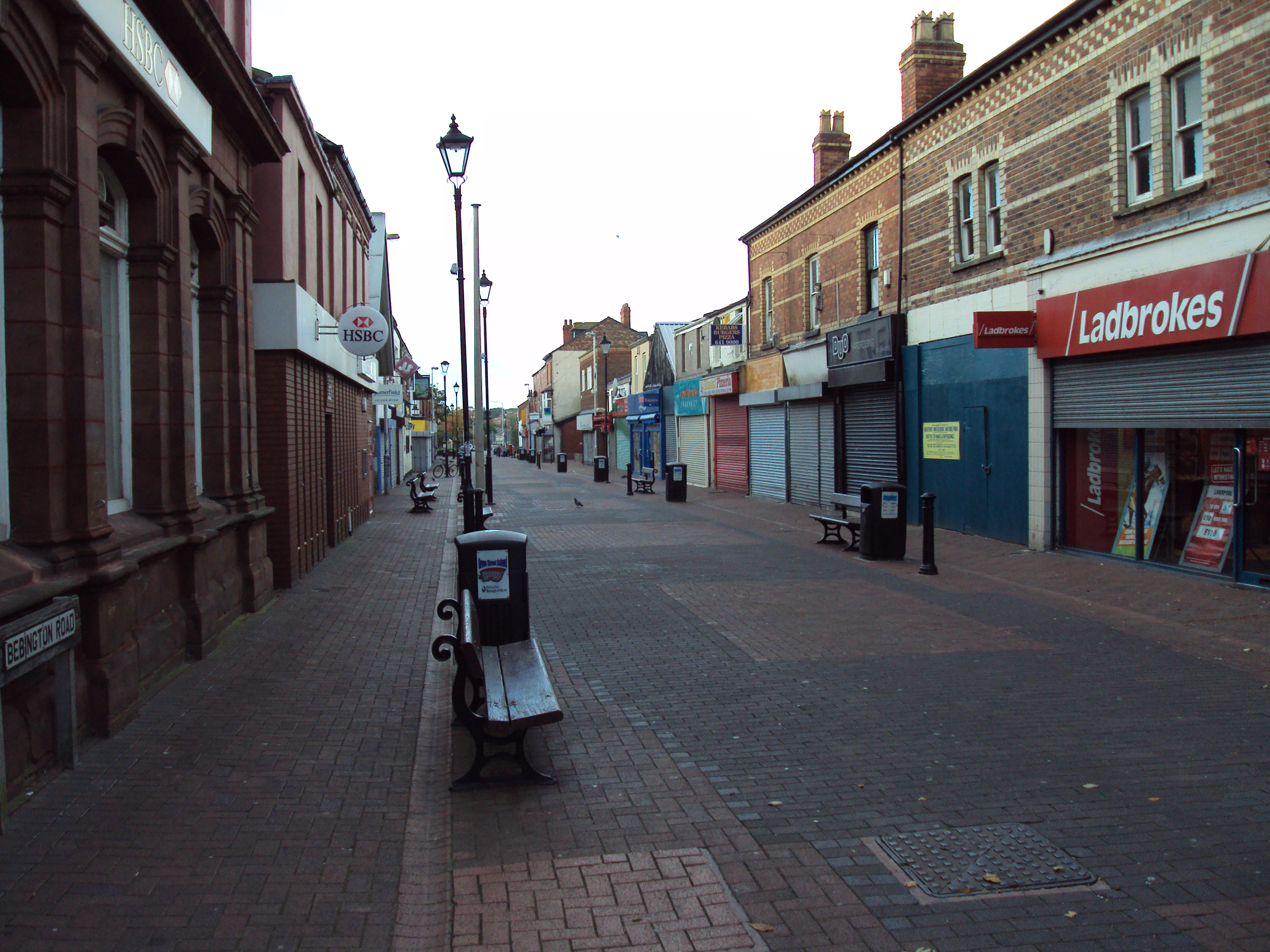
New Ferry precinct

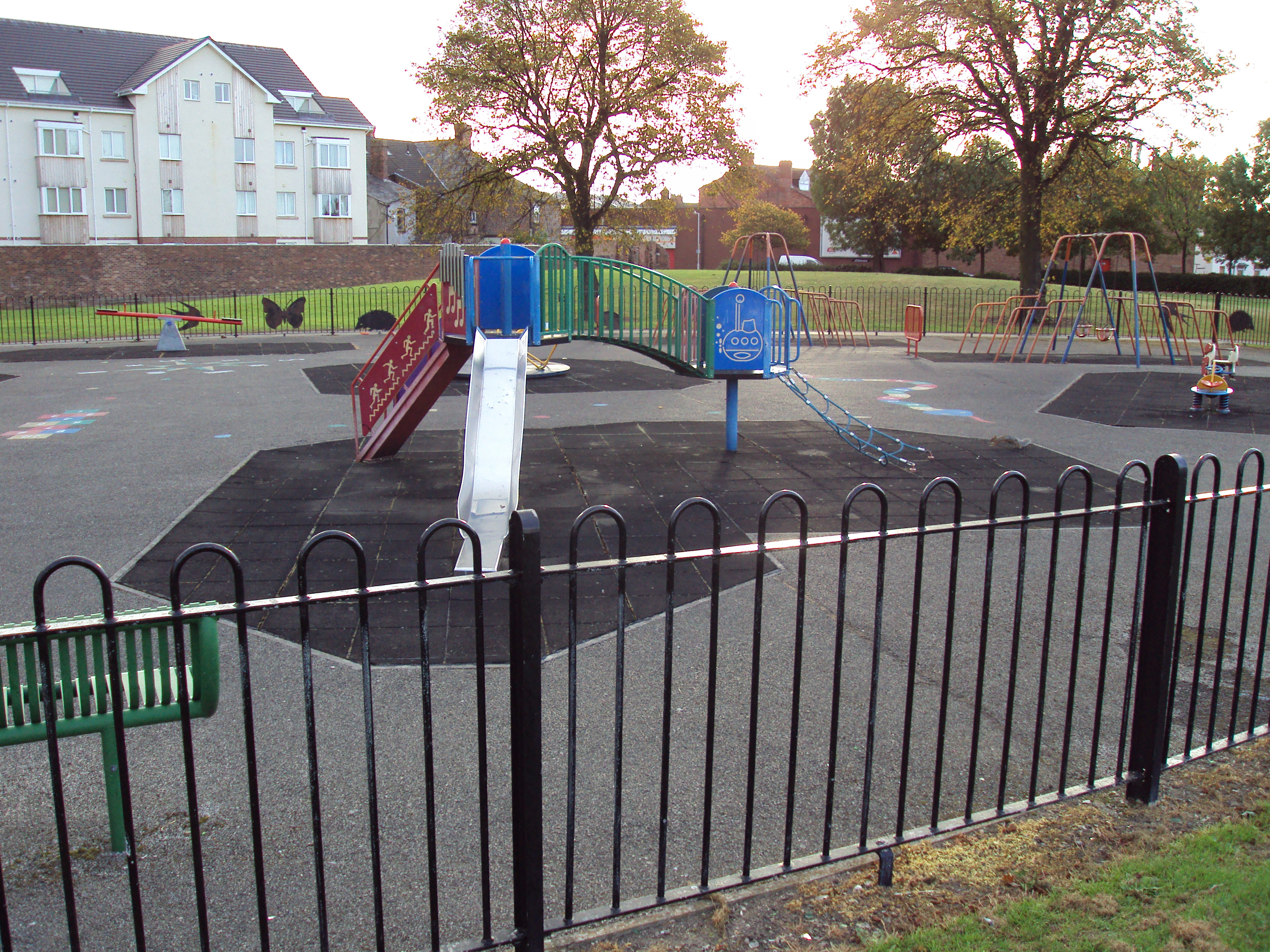
New Ferry Park

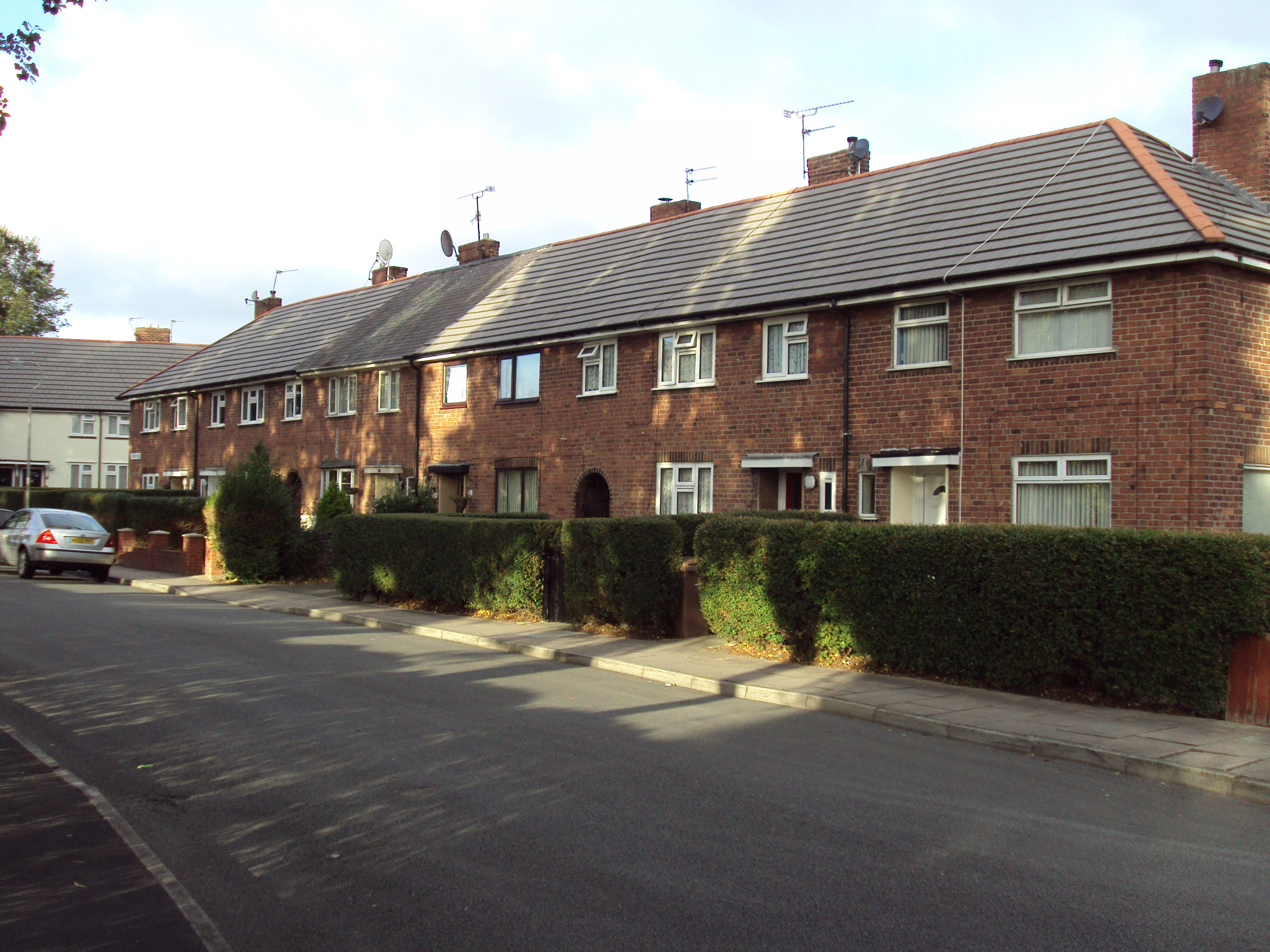
Grove Square

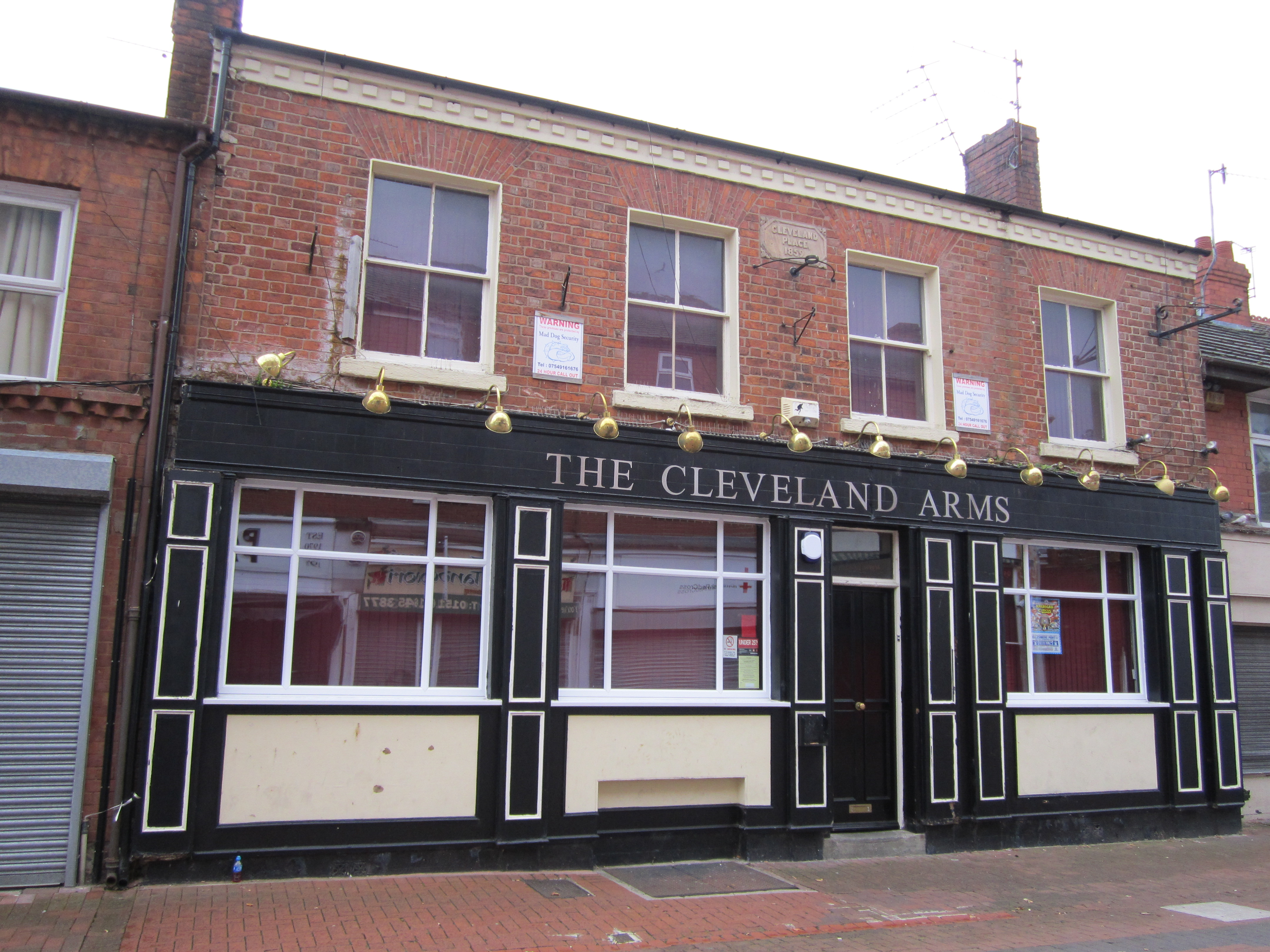
The Cleveland Arms pub
