= Christ Church, Higher Bebington =

Coordinates: 53.3587°N 3.0253°W

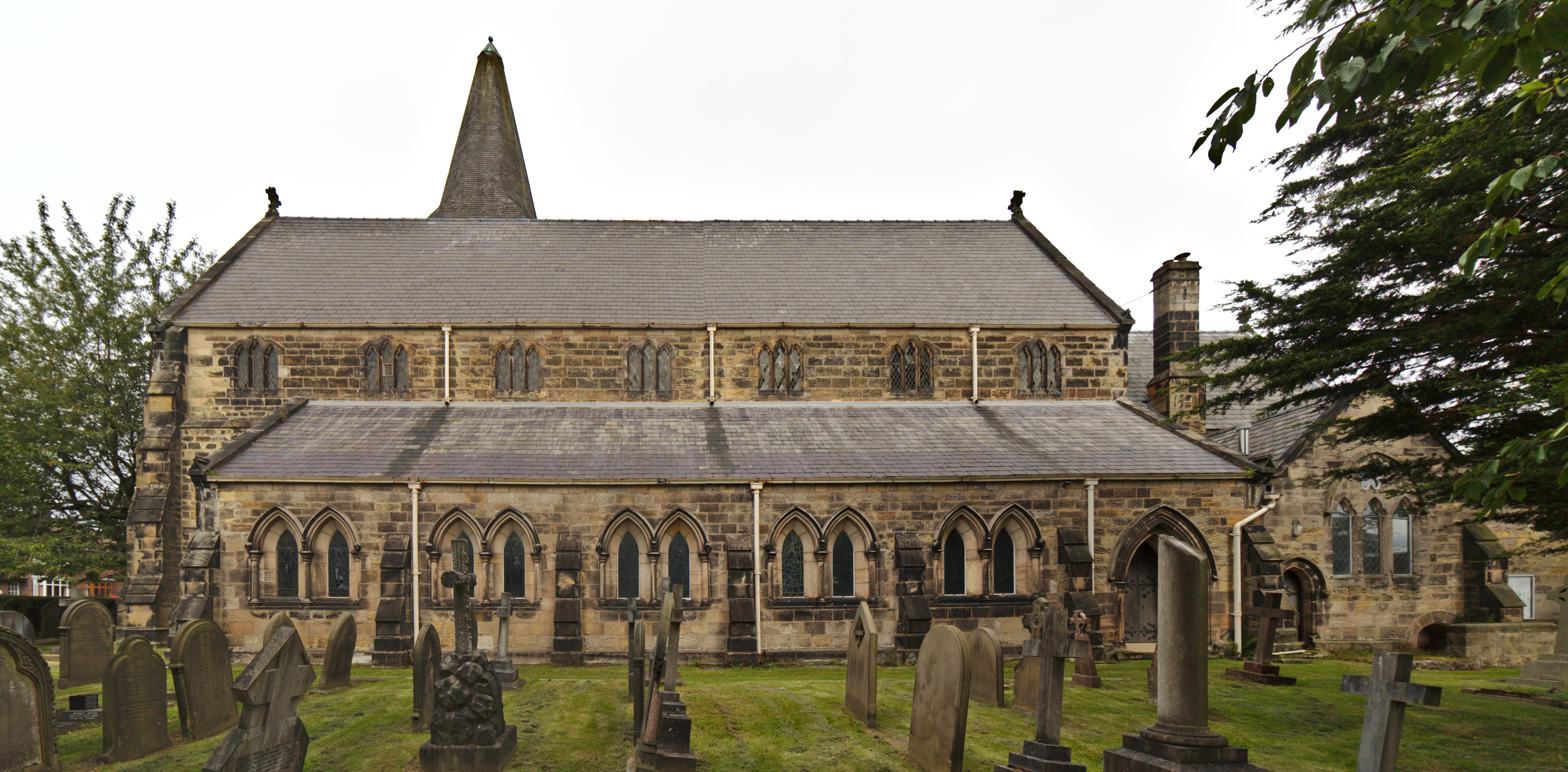
- Christ Church, Higher Bebington

- Location in Merseyside
- OS grid reference: SJ 319 851
- Location: King's Road, Higher Bebington, Wirral, Merseyside
- Country: England
- Denomination: Anglican
- Website: Christ Church, Higher Bebington

History
- Consecrated: 24 December 1859

Architecture
- Groundbreaking: 1 August 1857
- Completed: 1859

Specifications
- Materials: Sandstone, slate roofs

Administration
- Province: York
- Diocese: Chester
- Archdeaconry: Chester
- Deanery: Wirral, North
- Parish: Christ Church, Higher Bebington

Clergy
- Vicar: Rev. Michael Loach

Christ Church is in King's Road, Higher Bebington, Wirral, Merseyside, England. It is an active Anglican parish church in the deanery of Wirral, North, the archdeaconry of Chester, and the diocese of Chester. The church is recorded in the National Heritage List for England as a designated Grade II listed building.

== History ==
Christ Church was built between 1857 and 1859, and designed by Walter Scott. (Note: Walter Scott was a local architect.) The foundation stone was laid on 1 August 1857, and the church was consecrated by the Rt Revd John Graham, bishop of Chester on 24 December 1859. The steeple was added in 1884–85, but the tip of the spire was lost in 1980.

== Architecture ==
=== Exterior ===
The church is constructed in sandstone from Storeton quarry, and has slate roofs. Its architectural style is that of the 13th century. The plan consists of a seven-bay nave with a clerestory, north and south six-bay aisles under lean-to roofs, a chancel, a north vestry, a north organ loft, and a northwest steeple. The windows along the sides of the aisles are paired lancets, and there is a three-light window in the southwest of the nave. In the clerestory are three-light windows with trefoil heads. The west window of the nave has four lights containing Geometric tracery; this is flanked by lancet windows. Below the window is a gabled entrance. The chancel has a four-light east window, the vestry has a three-light west window with plate tracery and three trefoil-headed east windows, and the organ loft has three lancets with a spherical triangle window above. The tower has angle buttresses, a west entrance, and a north two-light window with plate tracery. The bell openings are louvred with trefoil heads. The tower is surmounted by a shingled broach spire. Set into the wall of the porch is a stone bearing the fossilized footprint of a Chirotherium, an archosaur.

=== Interior ===
Inside the church the six-bay arcades are carried on alternate round and octagonal piers. The columns for these are monoliths. The roofs are scissor-braced, that of the chancel being carried on corbels carved with angels. The chancel screen dates from 1912, and is carved with tracery and motifs including cherubs and vines. The pulpit is in stone, and is carved with tracery, arched panels, and buttresses. There are blind arcades on the east chancel wall, and on the reredos. The font is carried on shafts with angel corbels, and has panels carved with symbols. The stained glass in the west window dates from 1862 and is by R. B. Edmundson. A companion window to this was at the east end, but this was lost in Second World War, and has been replaced by a window of 1951 depicting the Nativity, designed by T. F. Wilford of Marple Bridge. On the south side of the chancel is a window of 1905 by C. E. Kempe, and on the north side is one of 1961 by A. V. Holloway. The windows in the north aisle date from between 1927 and 1937, and were made by Morris & Co. The three-manual pipe organ was made in 1936 by Rushworth and Dreaper.

== See also ==
- Listed buildings in Bebington

== Notes and references ==
Notes

Citations
