= Sloyne =

Anchorage in the River Mersey, England

Coordinates: 53°22′41″N 02°59′45″W

The Sloyne is an anchorage in the River Mersey, in North West England. It lies off the Wirral shore between Rock Ferry and New Ferry. In past times it was used by ships of deeper draught, and was for much of the 19th century the berth of the Royal Navy training ship HMS Conway. In the 20th century it became the unloading point for the Tranmere Oil Terminal, being able to accommodate vessels of up to 65,000 tons.
