= Listed buildings in Bebington =

Bebington is a town in Wirral, Merseyside, England. It contains seven buildings that are recorded in the National Heritage List for England as designated listed buildings. Of these, one is listed at Grade I, the highest of the three grades, and the others are at Grade II, the lowest grade. The listed buildings consist of two churches, two houses, a sundial, and a former public house.

== Key ==
Grade	Criteria
I	Buildings of exceptional interest, sometimes considered to be internationally important
II	Buildings of national importance and special interest

== Buildings ==
Name and location	Photograph	Date	Notes	Grade
St Andrew's Church, Lower Bebington; 53.34792°N 3.00354°W		12th century	Additions and alterations have been made to the church during the following centuries. It is built in sandstone, and consists of a nave, aisles, a chancel, chapels, and a southwest steeple. The steeple has a tower with buttresses, a stair turret, louvred bell openings, and a splay spire with lucarnes. The architectural styles include Norman, Decorated, and Perpendicular.	I
25 The Village, Lower Bebington; 53.35300°N 3.00483°W		17th century	A house in a single storey and an attic, with a seven-bay front and a thatched roof. The first four bays are timber-framed, and the others are in stone; the second to fourth bays project forward. Most of the windows are horizontally-sliding sashes, some are casements, and there is a small eyebrow dormer. At the rear is a mullioned window.	II
Royal Oak, Higher Bebington; 53.35499°N 3.02644°W	—	1739	Originally a public house, later used as an office, the building is in stone with a slate roof. It has two storeys and two bays, with a lean-to extension on the right. The windows are sashes, there is a datestone, and above the doorway is a plain lintel.	II
Sundial, Lower Bebington; 53.34772°N 3.00329°W		1764 (possible)	The sundial is in the churchyard of St Andrew's Church. It is in stone, and consists of a chamfered shaft with an octagonal cap carrying a brass plate and a gnomon.	II
2 and 4 Cross Lane, Higher Bebington; 53.34693°N 3.01207°W	—	c. 1837	A pair of stone houses with a slate roof, in two storeys and two bays. The entrances, which have gabled porches, and the windows, which are horizontally-sliding sashes, have hood moulds. At the top of the houses is a cornice.	II
Christ Church, Higher Bebington; 53.35867°N 3.02542°W	—	1857–59	The church was designed by Walter Scott in the style of the late 13th century. The steeple was added in 1884–85, but the top of the spire was lost in 1980. The church is built in stone and it has a stone-slate roof. It consists of a nave with a clerestory, aisles, a chancel, a south vestry, and a northwest steeple. The steeple has buttresses, a west entrance, and a broach spire.	II
Central Library; 53.34993°N 3.00430°W		1967–71	The library is in Modernist style, built on a frame of reinforced concrete on piled foundations, and faced in the lower parts with dark blue-brown bricks, and in the upper parts with white Skye marble. It has a rectangular plan, has a flat roof, and is in two storeys with a partial basement. The lower storey contains circular windows in the form of portholes, and along the upper storey are bands of long oblong windows. On the flat roof is a small tiled pyramidal roof, a flue in the form of a funnel, and a square brick block housing the book lift.	II
