= St Andrew's Church, Bebington =

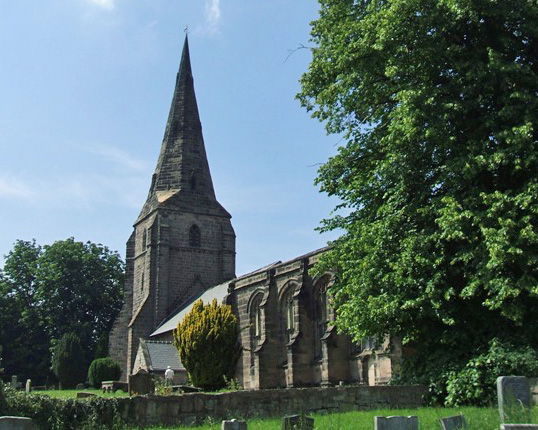
- St Andrew's Church, Bebington, from the southeast
- St Andrew's Church, Bebington
- 53.3480°N 3.0034°W
- OS grid reference: SJ 333 839
- Location: Bebington, Wirral, Merseyside
- Country: England
- Denomination: Anglican
- Churchmanship: Conservative evangelical
- Website: St Andrew, Bebington

History
- Status: Parish church
- Dedication: Saint Andrew

Architecture
- Functional status: Active
- Heritage designation: Grade I
- Designated: 27 December 1962
- Architectural type: Church
- Style: Gothic
- Completed: 1847

Specifications
- Materials: Sandstone

Administration
- Province: York
- Diocese: Chester
- Archdeaconry: Chester
- Deanery: Wirral North
- Parish: Bebington

Clergy
- Rector: David Vestergaard

St Andrew's Church is in the town of Bebington, Wirral, Merseyside, England. It is recorded in the National Heritage List for England as a designated Grade I listed building. The architectural historian Raymond Richards considers it to be the finest old parish church in Wirral. It is an active Anglican parish church in the diocese of Chester, the archdeaconry of Chester and the deanery of Wirral North.

== History ==
A church built from local Storeton sandstone was present before the Norman Conquest. Some of the stones from this church are still present in the south wall of the present church. A priest in Bebington was recorded in the Domesday Book. The Saxon church was later replaced by a Norman church. Building of the tower started in 1300 and was completed around 50 years later. The church was remodelled in the 14th century, the south aisle was widened and a three-bay chancel was built. In the 16th century rebuilding started at the east end in Perpendicular style. The chancel and chapels were built but the scheme was interrupted by the Reformation. In 1847 the church was reordered and the north arcade was built in Norman style. More recently the church has been modernised by re-siting the rood screen, removing the choirstalls, installing a kitchen and toilets and creating a crèche and meeting room in the tower.

== Architecture ==
=== Exterior ===
The church is built in sandstone. Its plan consists of a four bay nave which widens to the east, aisles to the north and south, a three bay chancel with north and south chapels, and a tower protruding from the southwest corner. There is a contrast of styles between the chancel and the chapels, which are Perpendicular in style, and the nave, which is mainly Early Decorated. Part of the south arcade survives from the Norman church and the north arcade is a copy of this. The tower has deep buttresses, the western two of which are diagonal. On the northern side is a rectangular stair turret. On the west face is a window of two lights and at the second stage is a lancet window. The two-light bell openings are louvred. At the summit is a splay spire with lucarnes. From masons' marks, the lower parts of the tower date from the very early 14th century while the "ringing loft" dates from the middle of that century. The door to the outside of the tower was blocked in the 18th century, when a new door was cut within the church, but was re-opened in 1847. The tower had been rebuilt in 1805 after being struck by lightning. The last work of any significance was carried out in 1905.

=== Interior ===
The altar is prominent; it dates from 1911, was designed by C. E. Deacon, and was carved by Harry Hems. They also created the screens of 1898 and 1908. The reredos dates from 1951, and is by Bernard A. Miller. The stalls include three seats with misericords depicting a dolphin, a bearded face and a pelican. Four stalls end with poppy-heads. The font is circular and is of uncertain date. The stained glass in the east window was designed by T. F. Wilford in 1953. That in the north transept is signed by William Warrington and is dated 1859. On the south side of the church are two windows designed by Henry Holiday for Powell's, one of which is dated 1881 and the other 1886. The parish chest dates from the early 16th century. The parish registers begin in 1558 and the churchwardens' accounts in 1774. There is a ring of eight bells, all of which were cast at the Whitechapel Bell Foundry. Five bells dated 1845 were by Charles and George Mears and the other three, dated 1907, were by Mears and Stainbank. The two-manual organ is by Henry Willis & Sons, which replaced an earlier organ of 1885 by E. Franklin Lloyd.

== External features ==
In the churchyard is a sandstone sundial dated possibly 1764. It consists of a chamfered shaft with octagonal cap, on top of which is a brass plate and gnomon. It is listed at Grade II. The churchyard also contains the war graves of nineteen service personnel, four of World War I and fifteen of World War II.

== Present activities ==
The church holds traditional Anglican services on Sundays, arranges various events during the week, and supports a number of groups.

== See also ==
- Grade I listed buildings in Merseyside
- Grade I listed churches in Merseyside
- Listed buildings in Bebington
