= Bob Weighill =

RAF Air Commodore & England international rugby union player

- Born: Robert Harold George Weighill; 9 September 1920 Kings Norton
- Died: 27 October 2000 (aged 80) Halton, Buckinghamshire
- School: Wirral Grammar School for Boys

Rugby union career
- Position: No. 8
Senior career
Years	Team	Apps	(Points)
- Birkenhead Park
–	Waterloo R.F.C.		
–	Harlequins		
–	Leicester		
–	RAF		
–	Combined Services		
–	Notts, Lincs and Derbys county		
International career
Years	Team	Apps	(Points)
1947–1948	England	4	(0)

Robert Harold George Weighill, CBE DFC (1920–2000) was a rugby union international who represented England in the Five Nations Championship in 1947 and 1948. He also captained his country, and later became Secretary of the Rugby Football Union. Weighill served in the Royal Air Force and rose to the rank of Air Commodore.

== Life ==
Bob Weighill was born on 9 September 1920 in Kings Norton. He was educated at Wirral Grammar School for Boys and was the freestyle swimming champion of Cheshire in 1935–36. Weighill served with Cheshire Constabulary between 1937 and 1941 and joined the RAF as a pilot. In 1944 he was awarded the Distinguished Flying Cross and he eventually rose to the rank of Air Commodore and commanded the RAF No. 1 School of Technical Training at RAF Halton. He was honoured as a Commander of the Order of the British Empire in 1970.

== Rugby union career ==
Weighill played club rugby for Birkenhead Park, Waterloo R.F.C., Harlequins and Leicester. At representative level, he captained the RAF rugby team from 1945 to 1952, and captained the Combined Services side and the Notts, Lincs and Derbys county team. He made his international debut on 15 March 1947 at Twickenham in the England vs Scotland match (Calcutta Cup). Of the four matches he played for his national side, he was on the winning side twice. He played his final match for England on 29 March 1948 at Colombes, Paris in the France vs England match, in which he captained the national team.

As a rugby union administrator, Weighill was an England selector from 1959 and 1964 and Secretary of the RFU between 1974 and 1986. From 1986 to 1995 he was the Honorary Secretary of the Five Nations and Home Unions Committee.
