= John Dalby (painter) =

English painter (1810–1865)

The Royal Rock Beagles, painted by Dalby in 1845

John Dalby (1810–1865) was an English 19th-century painter of horses and hunting scenes.

Dalby lived in York and signed his paintings "Dalby York" so that he is sometimes known as Dalby of York. His father, David Dalby (1794–1836), painted landscapes and animals.
