= Royal Rock Beagles =

- Royal Rock Beagles by John Dalby, 1845.
- Hunt type: Beagling
- Country: United Kingdom

History
- Founded: 1845
- Disbanded: 2015

Hunt information
- Hound breed: Beagle
- Hunt country: Wirral Peninsula
- Quarry: Hare

The Royal Rock Beagles was a pack of beagles founded at Rock Ferry in 1845. The pack was used to hunt hare in the Wirral and subsequently in Wales as the character of the Cheshire countryside changed. It was for a long time the oldest beagle pack in the UK but ceased to hunt in 2015.

== See also ==
List of beagle, harrier and basset packs of the United Kingdom
