= 1945 Bebington Municipal Borough Council election =

1945 UK local government election

The 1945 Bebington Municipal Borough Council election took place in 1945 to elect members of Bebington Municipal Borough Council in England.

After the election, the composition of the council was:

Party	Seats	±
Labour	?	?
Conservative	?	?
Residents	?	?
Ex-service	?	?
Ind. Conservative	?	?

== Election results ==
=== Overall election result ===
Bebington Municipal Borough Council election results, 1945
Party	Candidates						Votes		
Party	Stood	Elected	Gained	Unseated	Net	% of total	%	No.	Net %
Labour	21	7	?	?	?	35.0	38.4	6,409	?
Ex-service	17	3	?	?	?	15.0	23.5	3,924	?
Residents	6	4	?	?	?	20.0	18.6	3,095	?
Conservative	8	6	?	?	?	25.0	13.4	2,230	?
Ind. Conservative	1	1	?	?	?	5.0	4.0	662	?
Independent	1	0	?	?	?	0.0	2.1	356	?

(Note: % of total refers to % of wards won.)

== Ward results ==
=== Eastham ===
Eastham (3)
Party	Candidate	Votes	%	±%
Residents	C. Reid (Note: Elected to serve a 4-year term.)	1,068	58.5	?
Residents	N. Henesey (Note: Elected to serve a 2-year term.)	1,010	–	–
Residents	T. Jarman (Note: Elected to serve a 1-year term.)	983	–	–
Labour	W. Walker	527	28.9	?
Labour	F. Lever	454	–	–
Labour	N. King	444	–	–
Ex-service	R. Thomas	231	12.7	?
Majority		541	29.6	?
Registered electors		3,333		
Residents win				
Residents win				
Residents win				

=== Higher Bebington ===
Higher Bebington (3)
Party	Candidate	Votes	%	±%
Conservative	J. Williams	978	53.5	?
Conservative	J. Penman	951	–	–
Conservative	W. Jones	872	–	–
Labour	F. Starkie	509	27.9	?
Labour	A. Rice	463	–	–
Labour	C. Brown	443	–	–
Ex-service	W. Jones	340	18.6	?
Ex-service	A. Beer	21	–	–
Majority		469	25.7	?
Registered electors		3,543		
Conservative win				
Conservative win				
Conservative win				

=== Lower Bebington ===
Lower Bebington (2)
Party	Candidate	Votes	%	±%
Labour	S. Green	546	32.1	?
Conservative	R. Merry	519	30.5	?
Labour	J. Engle	495	–	–
Conservative	A. Byrne	412	–	–
Residents	J. Auld	380	22.4	?
Residents	J. Duffin	333	–	–
Ex-service	L. Anderson	255	15.0	?
Ex-service	F. Lister	225	–	–
Majority		27	1.6	?
Registered electors		3,312		
Labour win				
Conservative win				

=== New Ferry ===
New Ferry (2)
Party	Candidate	Votes	%	±%
Labour	W. Roberts	843	77.6	?
Labour	B. Jones	831	–	–
Ex-service	G. Harvey	244	22.4	?
Ex-service	A. Holland	216	–	–
Majority		599	55.1	?
Registered electors		3,036		
Labour win				
Labour win				

=== North Bromborough ===
North Bromborough (2)
Party	Candidate	Votes	%	±%
Ind. Conservative	A. Gittens	662	31.4	?
Labour	S. Littlewood	575	27.3	?
Ex-service	G. Johnson	515	24.4	?
Labour	K. Owen	511	–	–
Independent	J. Dixey	356	16.9	?
Majority		87	4.1	?
Registered electors		2,883		
Ind. Conservative win				
Labour win				

=== Park ===
Park (2)
Party	Candidate	Votes	%	±%
Conservative	F. Williams	775	45.4	?
Labour	E. Sarson	664	38.9	?
Labour	L. Birch	574	–	–
Ex-service	M. Jones	267	15.7	?
Ex-service	E. Dawkins	182	–	–
Majority		111	6.5	?
Registered electors		3,001		
Conservative win				
Labour win				

=== Poulton ===
Poulton
Party	Candidate	Votes	%	±%
Residents	J. Dodd	669	47.6	?
Labour	H. Davies	396	28.2	?
Ex-service	S. Williams	341	24.3	?
Majority		273	19.4	?
Registered electors		3,013		
Residents win				

=== South Bromborough ===
South Bromborough (2)
Party	Candidate	Votes	%	±%
Ex-service	A. Lyon	708	50.0	?
Labour	M. Odingo (Note: Term time unknown.)	707	50.0	?
Labour	T. Owen	705	–	–
Ex-service	W. Owen	668	–	–
Majority		1	0.1	?
Registered electors		3,346		
Ex-service win				
Labour win				

=== Sunlight ===
Sunlight (2)
Party	Candidate	Votes	%	±%
Ex-service	H. Jones	823	52.5	?
Ex-service	F. McNeill	775	–	–
Labour	T. Green	746	47.5	?
Labour	J. Roby	734	–	–
Majority		77	4.9	?
Registered electors		3,075		
Ex-service win				
Labour win				

=== Woodhey ===
Woodhey (2)
Party	Candidate	Votes	%	±%
Conservative	A. Brooke	936	46.1	?
Labour	J. Ward	896	44.1	?
Conservative	R. Frankham	864	–	–
Labour	E. Veal	256	–	–
Ex-service	E. McLeod	200	9.8	?
Ex-service	J. Richardson	141	–	–
Majority		40	2.0	?
Registered electors		4,429		
Conservative win				
Labour win				

== Notes ==
• bold denotes the winning candidate
