= David Mathers =

David Mathers may refer to:

- David Mathers (footballer), Scottish footballer
- David Mathers (curler), Canadian curler
