= Ken Sloan =

Vice-Chancellor of Harper Adams University since 2021

Professor Kenneth Mark Sloan

Vice-Chancellor of Harper Adams University
- Incumbent
- Assumed office 2021
- Chancellor: The Princess Royal

Personal details
- Born: May 1972 (age 54) Wallasey, England
- Education: Glasgow University; University of Warwick
- Website: www.harper-adams.ac.uk

Professor Kenneth Mark Sloan (born 1972) is a British educational leader who has been Vice-Chancellor and Chief Executive Officer of Harper Adams University since 2021.

== Early life and education ==
Ken Sloan was born on 26 1972 in Wallasey, Merseyside, England. He was educated at St Mary's College in Wallasey, then read English literature at Glasgow University, graduating with a honours Master of Arts (MA) degree in 1995.

He went on to study an MBA at the University of Warwick in 2001.

== Career in Higher Education ==
Sloan started his career as an Audit trainee at KPMG between 1995 and 1997. He served as an admin officer at the University of Warwick between 1997-1999, then Assistant Registrar between 1999-2003, Director, 2003-2007 and Deputy Registrar 2008-2010.

He joined Serco as Business Development Director between 2010-2012 before returning to University of Warwick to take up the post of Registrar and Chief Operating Officer, then Deputy Vice-Chancellor, Enterprise and Government at Monash University between 2016 and 2021, becoming Adjunct Professor of Practice at Monash Business School in 2021. In 2016, Sloan was retained by Schwarzman Scholars to support the opening of Schwarzman College at Tsinghua University. He served as interim Dean of Students for the inaugural cohort’s first semester.

In 2022, Sloan became Chair of GuildHE and Director of University and Colleges Employers Association in 2022 (Chair, Finance and Audit Committee, 2023).

Certified Practising Accountant, Australia in 2016. MInstD in 2023, MIAgrE in 2023 and Fellow of the Association of University, Fellow of the Royal Society of Arts in 2016 and a Fellow of the Association of Higher Education Professionals in 2023 and a Leadership Fellow of the Society of Leadership Fellows, also in 2023.
