= Wirral Grammar School for Boys =

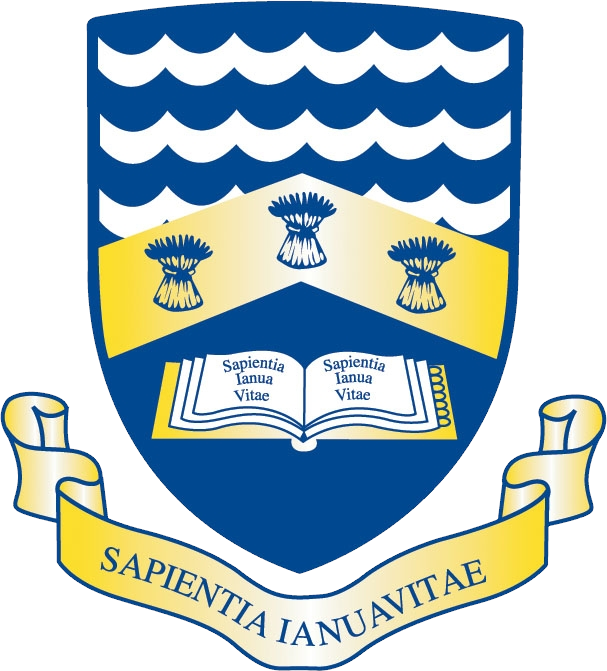
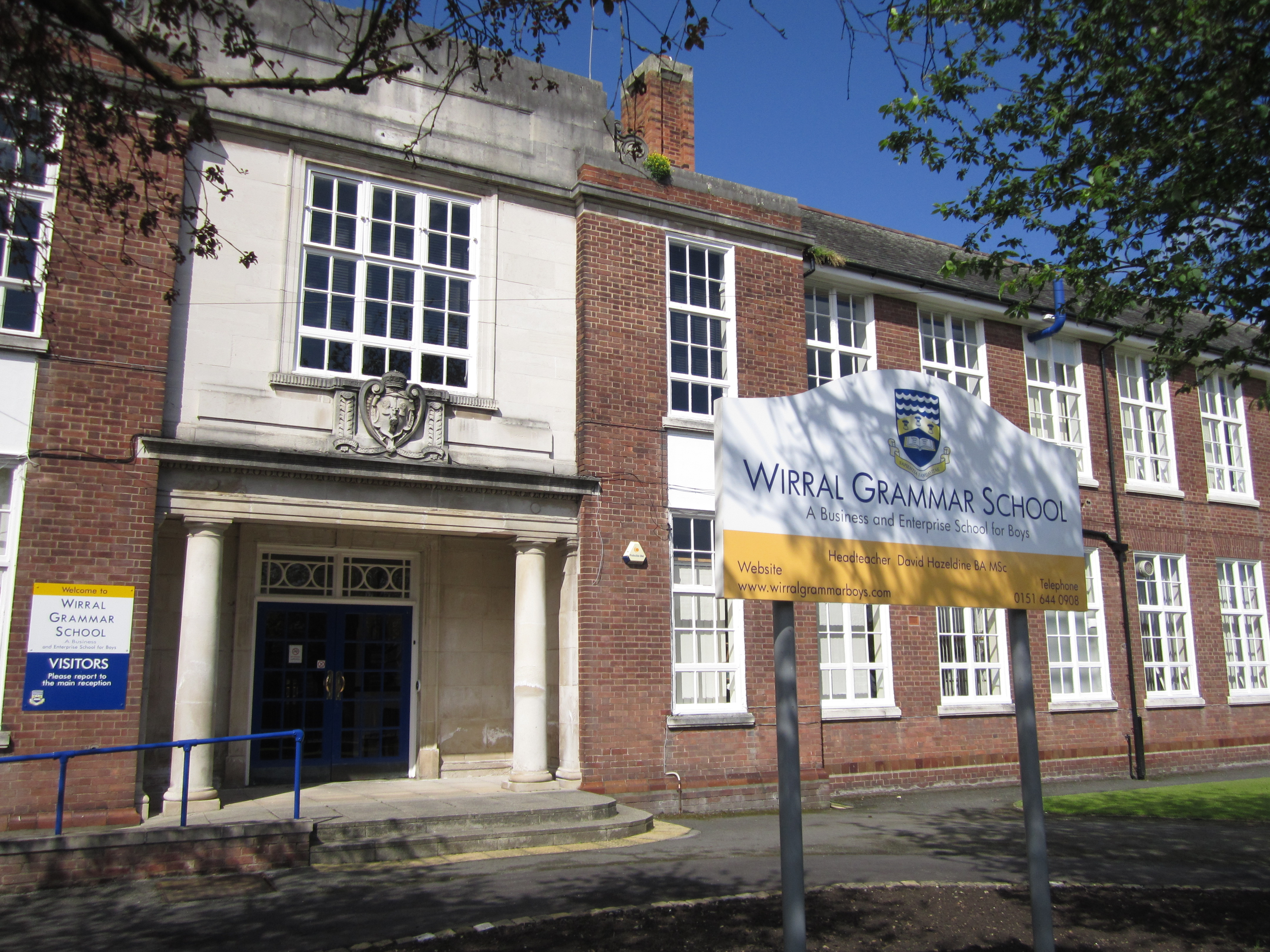
- School crest Wirral Grammar School for Boys, Cross Lane

Location
- Cross Lane; Bebington, Merseyside, CH63 3AQ; England; 53.348°N 3.013°W

Information
- Type: 11–18 boys Grammar school; Academy
- Motto: Latin: Sapientia Ianua Vitae (Wisdom is the Gateway to Life)
- Established: 1931
- Local authority: Wirral MBC
- Department for Education URN: 137476 Tables
- Ofsted: Reports
- Chair of Trust: Andrew Lawrence
- Head teacher: Simon Ascroft
- Staff: 120
- Gender: Boys
- Age: 11 to 18
- Enrolment: 1,057 (2022)
- Houses: Barber; Dodds; Hodgson; Lever
- Colour
- Publication: Nuntius
- Former pupils: Old Wirralians
- Website: www.wirralgrammarboys.com

Wirral Grammar School for Boys is an 11–18 boys maintained selective grammar school founded in 1931. It is situated on a 9.1 acres (3.7 ha) site to the west of Port Sunlight at Cross Lane, Bebington, on the Wirral Peninsula in England. Academically successful, the school was placed 42nd in the top 100 in the Daily Telegraph A-Level table in 2015 and 145th in the DfE GCSE table in the same year, but has not been inspected since its conversion to academy status.

The school's most recent Ofsted inspection occurred in November 2022, with inspectors grading the school overall as "Good". By November 2022, a total of 1,057 boys attended the school, 271 of whom were in the school's Sixth Form provision.

== History ==
=== Establishment ===
On 23 March 1925, Cheshire County Council passed a resolution to build a new secondary school in Bebington. Designed by the County architect, F Anstead Browne, the new school was opened by the Lord Lieutenant of Cheshire, Brigadier-General Sir William Bromley-Davenport on 26 September 1931.

The school was administered by Cheshire County Council until the council was dissolved in 1974; since then it has been administered by Wirral Metropolitan Borough Council, which maintains use of the 11+ for senior school admission.

=== Harold Wilson ===
The school was the alma mater of former prime minister of the United Kingdom Harold Wilson, who was a member of the sixth form and the school's first head boy in 1934.

=== Expansion ===
In 2008 the borough council resolved to replace mobile classrooms with a brick building for the mathematics department, business studies facilities, an extra Modern Foreign Languages room, additional science laboratories, a new music centre and several ICT suites.

There is now an exterior science area (including a greenhouse), and refurbishment of the main building included two sixth form history and politics classrooms. An entrance atrium, where exhibitions of pupils' work are held, is part of the new development.

ICT suites and business studies classrooms were also developed in the new building. Although special funding for such colleges ended in 2010, the schools has chosen to retain its focus on business and enterprise.

In 2008 a school radio station was established, called Livewire Radio, broadcasting daily at lunchtimes. Students and teachers host the shows, featuring various musical genres and discussions regarding issues relevant to pupils.

Over the course of summer 2013, further development included a new multi-purpose activity hall, refurbished conference hall, new cookery classrooms and refurbished changing rooms. During the summer of 2012, an outdoor classroom was built as part of the art department on land previously occupied by music rooms. The landscaped area is used by the department for observational work and the displaying of 3-d pieces. It came into use in September 2012.

=== Enterprise School ===
The school was designated as a Business and Enterprise School in 2006 and became a Business and Enterprise College in 2008. This provided a grant for development of ICT facilities and for the business studies department to benefit both pupils and the wider community, including summer classes in ICT, photography and basic business skills.

== Overview ==
=== Extra–curricular ===
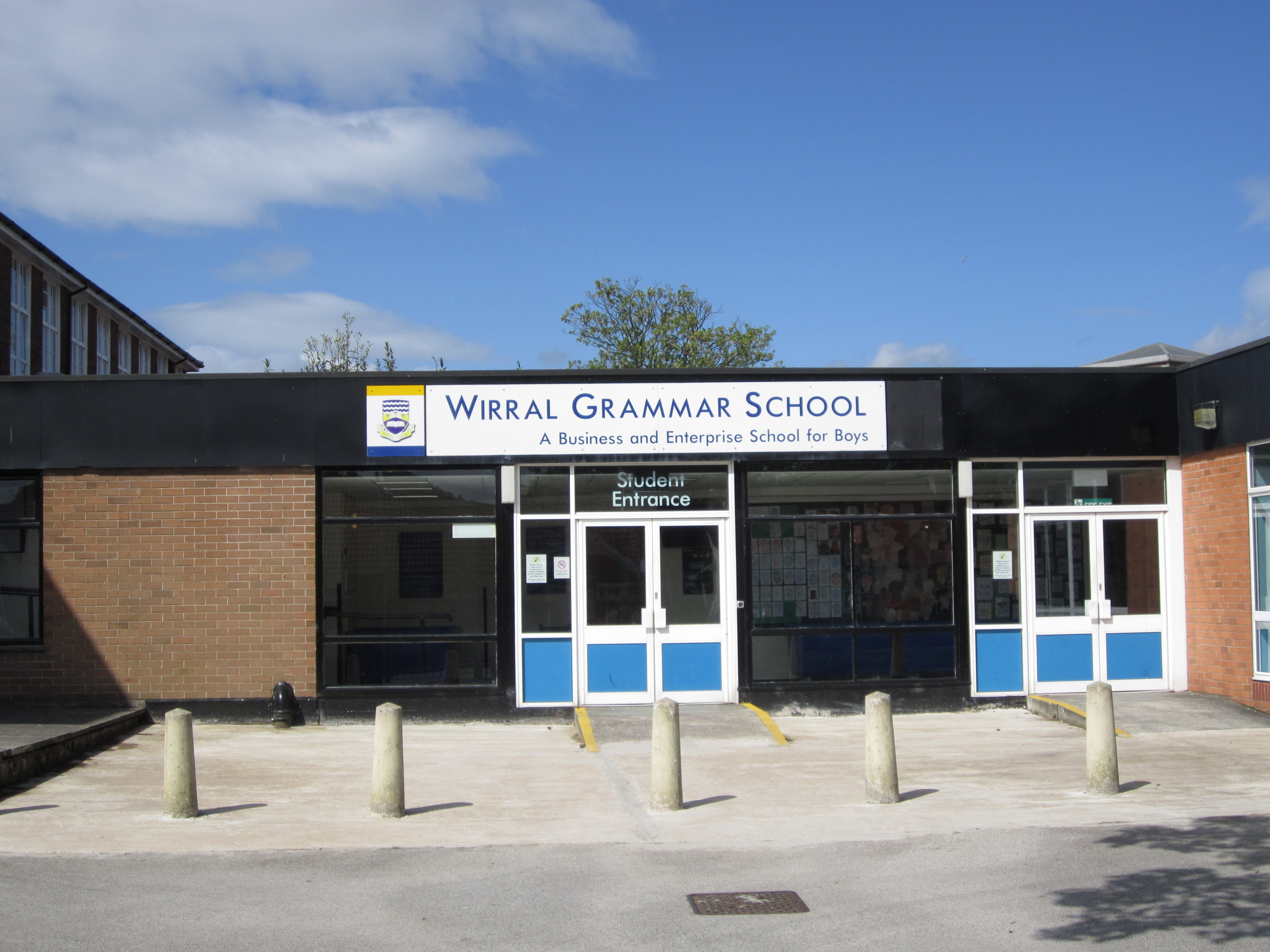
Main student entrance for boys at the school

The school has been commended for its sporting commitment, with particular efforts in Rugby union, with a tradition of the sport at the school. School rugby teams often tour, including to Australia and the United States. The most notable achiever in recent years is the rugby player Matt Cairns of Saracens & England. Other sports promoted in the school include athletics, badminton, basketball, cross country running, handball and volleyball.

Other outdoor activities (developed at the school's outdoor centres on Anglesey and near Mold) include abseiling, caving, climbing, raft building and various high level rope activities.

== Headmasters ==
- 1931–1954 – James M. Moir
- 1955–1972 – Bernard H. T. Taylor
- 1972–1986 – Peter A. Fishwick
- 1986–1997 – Bernard J. Treacy
- 1997–2006 – Anthony M. Cooper
- 2006–2020 – David R. Hazeldine
- 2020–Present – Simon Ascroft

Interim headmasters have included O. Wilson (1954), B. Thompson (1986, 1997) and A. P. White (2020).

== Notable Wirralians ==
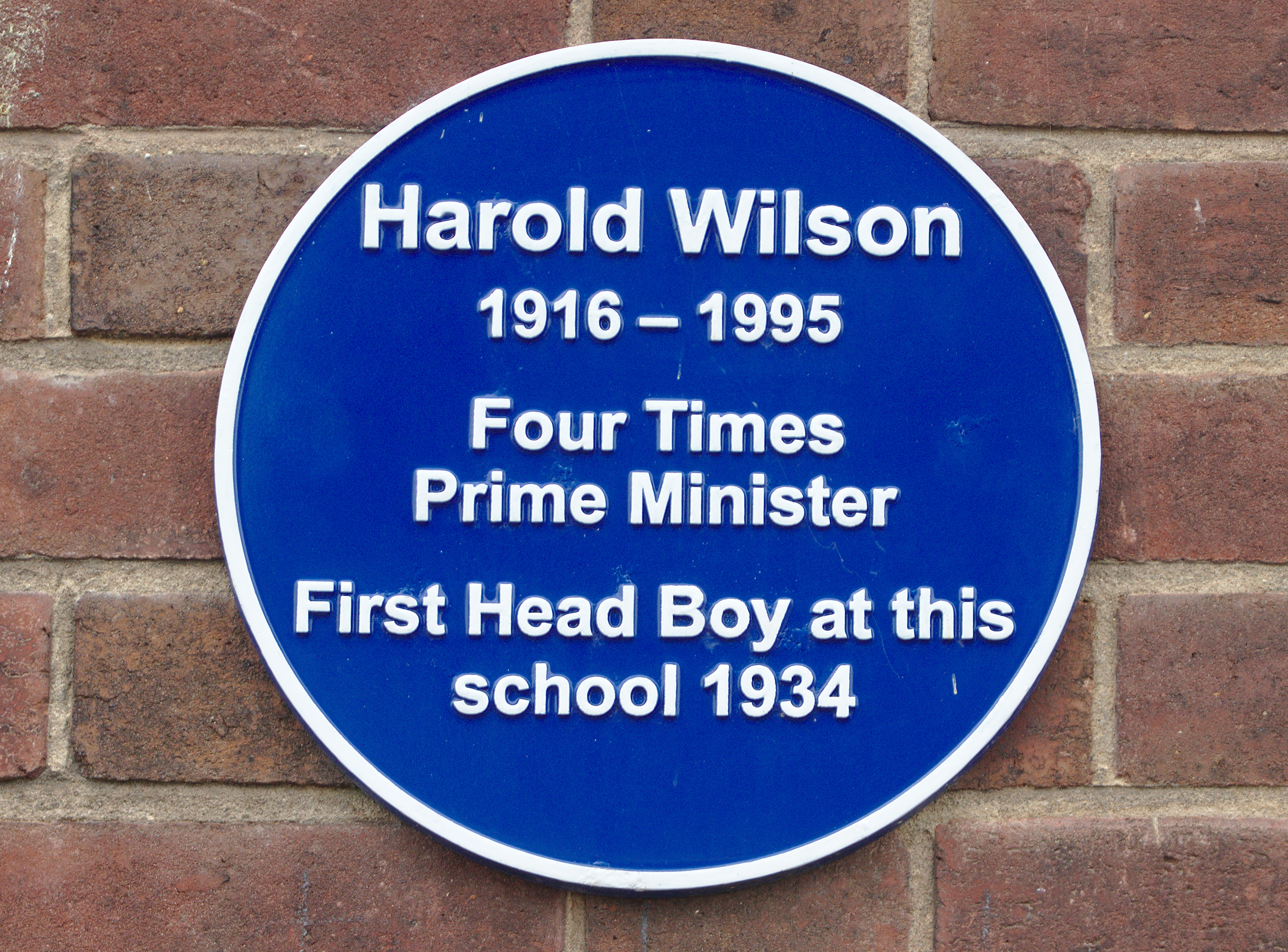
Plaque to Harold Wilson, Prime Minister, to the right of the main entrance of Wirral Grammar School for Boys Cross Lane, Bebington

- Ken Beamish, forward for Tranmere Rovers
- Peter Black, Liberal Democrat member of the Welsh Assembly for South Wales West since 1999
- Matt Cairns, rugby union player
- Alex Cox, film director
- John Ebbrell, football player
- Kenneth Halliwell, writer, known also for murdering playwright Joe Orton
- John Hardwick, television, film and theatre director
- Daniel Hunt, musician, songwriter, producer
- Oliver James (footballer)
- Steve Jones, geneticist
- Bernard Elgey Leake, geologist
- Kevin Lewis, footballer
- Justin Madders, Labour MP
- Max Power, footballer for Bradford City A.F.C.
- Ted Robbins, comedian and actor
- Tom Roebuck, rugby union player
- Ted Rowlands, Baron Rowlands CBE, Labour MP
- Grant Serpell, musician
- Sir Brian Smith, Vice-Chancellor of Cardiff University
- Paul Usher, actor
- Air Commodore Bob Weighill CBE DFC, Rugby Football Union international player and captain; secretary of the RFU
- Michael Wilde, former chairman of Southampton F.C.
- Barry Williams (athlete), Olympic hammer thrower in the 1972 Olympics
- Harold Wilson, Labour prime minister 1964–70 and 1974-6 (only attended the sixth form in 1932 to 1934,
- John Winn, British Army officer and winner of the Military Cross and Silver Star.
- Joel Tabiner, footballer for Crewe Alexandra.

== See also ==
- Wirral Grammar School for Girls
- Calday Grange Grammar School
- West Kirby Grammar School
- Bebington High School
