= Wirral Grammar School for Girls =

Location
- Heath road Bebington, Merseyside, CH63 3AF; 53.3485°N 3.0145°W

Information
- Type: Grammar school; Academy
- Motto: Latin: Monumentum Aere Perennius ("A monument more lasting than bronze", from Horace's Poem 3:30)
- Established: 1931
- Department for Education URN: 137171 Tables
- Ofsted: Reports
- Head teacher: J Ogunmyiwa
- Gender: Female
- Age: 11 to 18
- Enrolment: 1068
- Houses: 6: Unitas , Esperance , Ferens , Virtus , Alpha , Invicta
- Colour: Blue
- Website: www.wirralgirls.co.uk

Wirral Grammar School for Girls is an all-girls grammar school on the Wirral Peninsula in Merseyside, England.

== Admissions ==
It is located in Bebington, next door to Wirral Grammar School for Boys. The school consists of lower school (ages 11–16) and sixth form (ages 17–18), and entrance for Year 7 is by the 11-plus examination. Those wishing to join the Sixth Form can do so by meeting the GCSE grade requirements and applying through the school website. To join the Sixth Form, you do not have to have previously passed the 11+ examination. Jenny Ogunmyiwa has been head teacher since September 2022.

Wirral Grammar School for Girls has been designated as a "high performing school" by the Specialist Schools Academies Trust and has received an Ofsted rating of 'Outstanding' in every department.

== History ==
The school was founded in 1931. It was known as the Wirral County Grammar School for Girls until the late 1990s, being administered by Cheshire County Council before 1974, then by Wirral Metropolitan Borough Council. In the early 1970s, it had around 900 girls.

== Academic performance ==
The school attains some of the best A level results in North West England.

== Notable former pupils ==
- Jean Boht, actress
- Alison McGovern, Labour MP
- Sue Nelson, science writer and broadcaster
- Kate Robbins, actress

== See also ==
- Wirral Grammar School for Boys
- Calday Grange Grammar School
- West Kirby Grammar School
- Bebington High School
