= David Mather (cricketer) =

English cricketer

Personal information
- Full name: David Peter Mather
- Born: 20 November 1975 (age 50); Bebington, Cheshire, England
- Batting: Left-handed
- Bowling: Left-arm medium

Domestic team information
- Years: Team
- 1995–2000: Oxford University
- 1999: Oxfordshire
- 2000: Oxford Universities

Career statistics
Competition	First-class
Matches	32
Runs scored	74
Batting average	5.69
100s/50s	–/–
Top score	13
Balls bowled	4,652
Wickets	61
Bowling average	43.95
5 wickets in innings	1
10 wickets in match	1
Best bowling	3/48
Catches/stumpings	6/74
- Source: Cricinfo, 24 June 2019

David Peter Mather (born 20 November 1975) is an English former first-class cricketer.

Mather was born at Bebington in November 1975 and later attended St Hugh's College, Oxford, where he studied medicine. While studying at Oxford he made his debut in first-class cricket for Oxford University against Durham at Oxford in 1995. He played first-class cricket for Oxford until 2000, making 31 appearances. With his left-arm medium pace bowling, Mather took a total of 58 wickets at an average of 44.22, with best figures of 6 for 74. These figures, which were his only first-class five wicket haul, came against Cambridge University in 1998. He also played one first-class match for a combined Oxford Universities cricket team against Somerset at Taunton in 2000. After graduating he became a plastic surgeon. In addition to playing first-class cricket, Mather also played minor counties cricket for Oxfordshire twice in the 1999 Minor Counties Championship.
