= Matt Cairns =

English rugby union player

- Born: Matt Cairns; 31 March 1979 (age 47) Birkenhead, Merseyside, England
- Height: 1.83 m (6 ft 0 in)
- Weight: 108 kg (17 st 0 lb)
- School: Wirral Grammar School for Boys
- University: Brunel University

Rugby union career
- Position: Hooker
Amateur team(s)
Years	Team	Apps	(Points)
? -1998	Wirral Grammar School for Boys		
–	Wirral Rugby Club		
–	Wirral Rugby Club		
- Correct as of 10 July 2014
Senior career
Years	Team	Apps	(Points)
2011–2012	Harlequins		
2004–2011	Saracens	66	(20)
2003–04	Sale Sharks	18	(20)
1998–2003	Saracens	96	(62)
- Correct as of 10 July 2014
International career
Years	Team	Apps	(Points)
2007–	England	1	(0)
–	England Saxons		
–	England U21		
–	England Colts		
–	England Students		
- Correct as of 10 July 2014
National sevens team
Years	Team		Comps
- England Sevens
- Correct as of 10 July 2014

Matt Cairns (born 31 March 1979) is a former rugby union footballer who played at hooker for Harlequins and has been capped for the England national side as well as representing England in the Saxons and Sevens teams as well as at several age group levels. He also played for a season with Sale Sharks and has had two spells with Saracens. He retired on 14 February 2012 due to medical advice. He is now Head Coach of Caldy Rugby Club in CHAMP Rugby.

== Early life ==
Born 31 March 1979 in Birkenhead, Cairns attended Wirral Grammar School for Boys where he made his first representative appearances for the North Under-16s, followed by games at colts level for London and England while playing for Wirral Rugby Club. An all round sportsman, he also had trials for Liverpool F.C. He then attended Brunel University, playing at the time for England Students.

== Playing career ==
=== Saracens 1998–2003 ===
Cairns' first professional club was Saracens, joining the club's academy system and making two appearances for the first team as a substitute in the 1998–99 season, followed by a debut appearance in the starting line up the following season, along with several more bench appearances. In his third season he made several appearances in Saracens starting XVs and also recorded his maiden try.

In the 2001–02 and 2002–03 seasons Cairns was making regular first team appearances, with 2003 bringing another step up the international ladder, touring with the England Saxons in their Churchill Cup campaign.

It was clear that in the 2003–04 season it became clear that Cairns would competing for his place with French captain Raphaël Ibañez who had just been signed by Saracens, and he returned to the north for a spell with Sale Sharks.

=== Sale Sharks 2003–04 ===
Cairns spent a single season with Sale Sharks, making ten starting appearances in their Guinness Premiership campaign, with a further eight bench appearances and scoring four Premiership tries. He was once again called into the England Saxons side for their 2004 Churchill Cup tour, before returning to Saracens.

=== Saracens 2004–2012 ===
Cairns was soon a regular starter in Saracens line ups once again, despite facing competition for his place from the likes of Italian international Fabio Ongaro and Ireland's Shane Byrne, making more than 20 appearances in each season since his return to Vicarage Road. In the 2006–07 season he passed the 150 cap mark for Saracens in all competitions. In the same season he reached another landmark when he was called up to the full England side for their summer tour to South Africa, earning his first, and to date, only cap as a replacement during the first test against the Springboks on 26 May 2007 before falling victim to the virus that prevented many England players being considered for the second test.

He signed a new contract with Saracens in 2006, that if completed will see Cairns mark ten years of service with the club. Following the 2008/09 season Cairns was one of the bunch who were released by Saracens. Cairns has recently signed with London club Harlequins and was named on the bench in the LV= Cup Match against The Llanelli Scarlet's.
