= St John Plessington Catholic College =

Coordinates: 53.359°N 3.007°W

Saint John Plessington Catholic College

Location
- Old Chester Road; Bebington, Wirral, Merseyside, CH63 7LF; England

Information
- Type: Academy
- Motto: Always faithful to Christ
- Religious affiliation: Roman Catholic
- Established: 1870
- Department for Education URN: 139031 Tables
- Ofsted: Reports
- Staff: Headteacher (2024) Mr Peadar McLoughlin
- Gender: Co-educational
- Age: 11 to 18
- Enrolment: 1,450
- Website: stjohnplessington.com

St John Plessington Catholic College (SJP) is a Catholic secondary school and sixth form with academy status located in Bebington, Wirral, Merseyside, England. St John Plessington is in partnership with multiple other schools including St Mary's College, Wallasey in the Holy Family Multi Academy Trust.

== Patron Saint ==
The school was named after St. John Plessington, one of the 40 Catholic martyrs of England and Wales. Plessington was born in 1637 in Garstang, Lancashire, and ordained a Priest in Segovia on 25 March 1662. A year later St. Plessington returned to England, where he ministered to recusant and covert Roman Catholics in Holywell and Cheshire. He was arrested during the Popish Plot scare on the charge of being a Roman Catholic priest, and then imprisoned for two months. He was hung, drawn and quartered on 19 July 1679. In celebration of their patron saint, the school recognizes the feast day of St. John Plessington day on 19 July, where all students and teachers take part in a various spiritual and recreational activities.

== History ==
The current school site was originally St John's Secondary School. After a merger with Rock Ferry Convent in the late 1970s it became Plessington High School and occupied two sites (the second being the former Rock Ferry Convent site in Woodland Road). The school was awarded 'Technology College' status in 1998. In 2010, the school won the TES "Secondary School of the Year" award.

== Catholic Ethos ==
The School itself is named after St. John Plessington, and has a very strong Roman Catholic ethos. There is a weekly optional Mass in the chapel held by the school chaplain. On holy days Masses are held for the whole school by a local priest.

== Facilities ==
With the recent development of the school campus in the form of new buildings, opened by Cherie Blair, the school has gained six Information and Communications Technology rooms and a main hall/atrium. The school has a six-room dedicated special education centre off the dining hall staffed with 10+ teaching assistants for pupils with mental or learning disabilities. In the old building the school has two fully equipped Art rooms with paint and ceramic facilities. The SEN centre has access to the lift and disabled toilets throughout the building. A drama studio is next to the Dinner Hall.

== New buildings ==
Since the mid-1990s the school has undergone many changes, the building of the music suite was completed by 1992, the sports hall was completed by 1993, and officially opened by the Duke of York, Prince Andrew, in 1993. In 1994 the sixth-form building was completed (now used as the science building). In 2003, the school took over twelve newly built classrooms which house the RE and English departments and in 2004 benefited from a £5m building program which gave the school twelve additional classrooms, housing the Maths and Modern Foreign Languages (now ICT), two new DT workshops, a new library, a new main hall, a new atrium, reception and administrative area and a new sixth form common room. The dining room has also been enlarged and refurbished and a new area has been designated for Special Educational Needs (now used for the Assisi Centre/internal exclusion), this has since changed and is now used as a first aid area. A new extension is being built at the side of the RE and English building. This will provide improved access for the Sixth Form with improved independent study areas and additional classrooms housing the Media department. The Building will have direct access to the library and, in 2015, a new six form block was opened. In December 2021, it was announced that there would be a new build of a classroom block, the school had planning permission approved over 5 years before from Wirral council, a raised decking area for sixth form students was removed to make room for this.
