= Bebington =

Town in Merseyside, England

Coordinates: 53°21′00″N 3°00′15″W

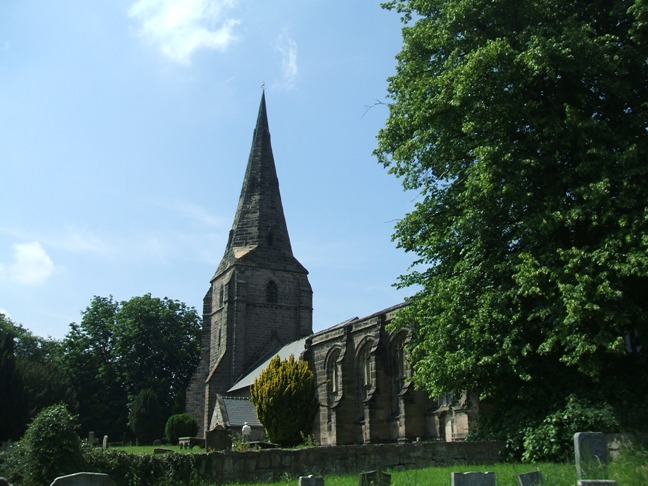
- St Andrew's Church, Lower Bebington

- Location within Merseyside
- Population: 57,600 (Built up area, 2021); 15,215 (Ward, 2021)
- OS grid reference: SJ333841
  - London: 176 mi (283 km) SE
- Metropolitan borough: Wirral
- Metropolitan county: Merseyside
- Region: North West
- Country: England
- Sovereign state: United Kingdom
- Post town: WIRRAL
- Postcode district: CH63
- Dialling code: 0151
- ISO 3166 code: GB-WRL
- Police: Merseyside
- Fire: Merseyside
- Ambulance: North West
- UK Parliament: Birkenhead

Bebington (/ˈbɛbɪŋtən/) is a town in the Metropolitan Borough of Wirral, in Merseyside, England. Historically part of Cheshire, it is 5 miles (8 km) south of Liverpool, close to the River Mersey on the eastern side of the Wirral Peninsula. Nearby towns include Birkenhead and Wallasey to the north-northwest, and Heswall to the west-southwest.

Bebington was an ancient parish, which included the two villages of Lower Bebington around the parish church of St Andrew's and Higher Bebington to the west, as well as several other surrounding hamlets. Following the 2021 census, the Office for National Statistics defined a Bebington built up area which had a population of 57,600. The Bebington electoral ward covers a much smaller area around the original village centres of Higher Bebington and Lower Bebington. Some definitions of Bebington include adjoining areas such as Port Sunlight (an early planned factory town), New Ferry, Spital and Storeton. The former Municipal Borough of Bebington, a local authority between 1937 and 1974, also included within its boundaries Bromborough, Eastham, Raby, Thornton Hough and Brimstage, which now fall within the electoral wards of Bromborough, Eastham and Clatterbridge.

According to a 2015 study commissioned by Royal Mail from the Centre for Economic and Business Research, Bebington's postcode area, CH63, is the most desirable in England in which to live and work. The study found that the area had "the ideal balance" of housing close to places of work, good schools and high employment.

== History ==
The name Bebington is derived from the Anglo-Saxon meaning the "Village of Bebba", probably a Saxon chief or landowner.

The area is thought to be the site of the "Birth of England" at the Battle of Brunanburh in 937, an English victory by the army of Æthelstan, King of England, and his brother Edmund over the combined armies of Olaf Guthfrithson, King of Dublin, Constantine II, King of Alba, and Owain ap Dyfnwal, King of the Cumbrians. Though relatively little known today, it was called "the greatest single battle in Anglo-Saxon history before Hastings." Michael Livingston claimed that Brunanburh marks "the moment when Englishness came of age." The Brackenwood golf course was cited in 2004 as the most likely site for the Battle of Brunanburh. Mention of the battle is made in dozens of sources, in Old English, Latin, Irish, Welsh, Anglo-Norman and Middle English, and there are many later accounts or responses to the battle. A contemporary record of the battle is found in the Old English poem Battle of Brunanburh, preserved in the Anglo-Saxon Chronicle.

The Church of St. Andrew, on a site occupied since Saxon times, dates from the 14th and 16th centuries.

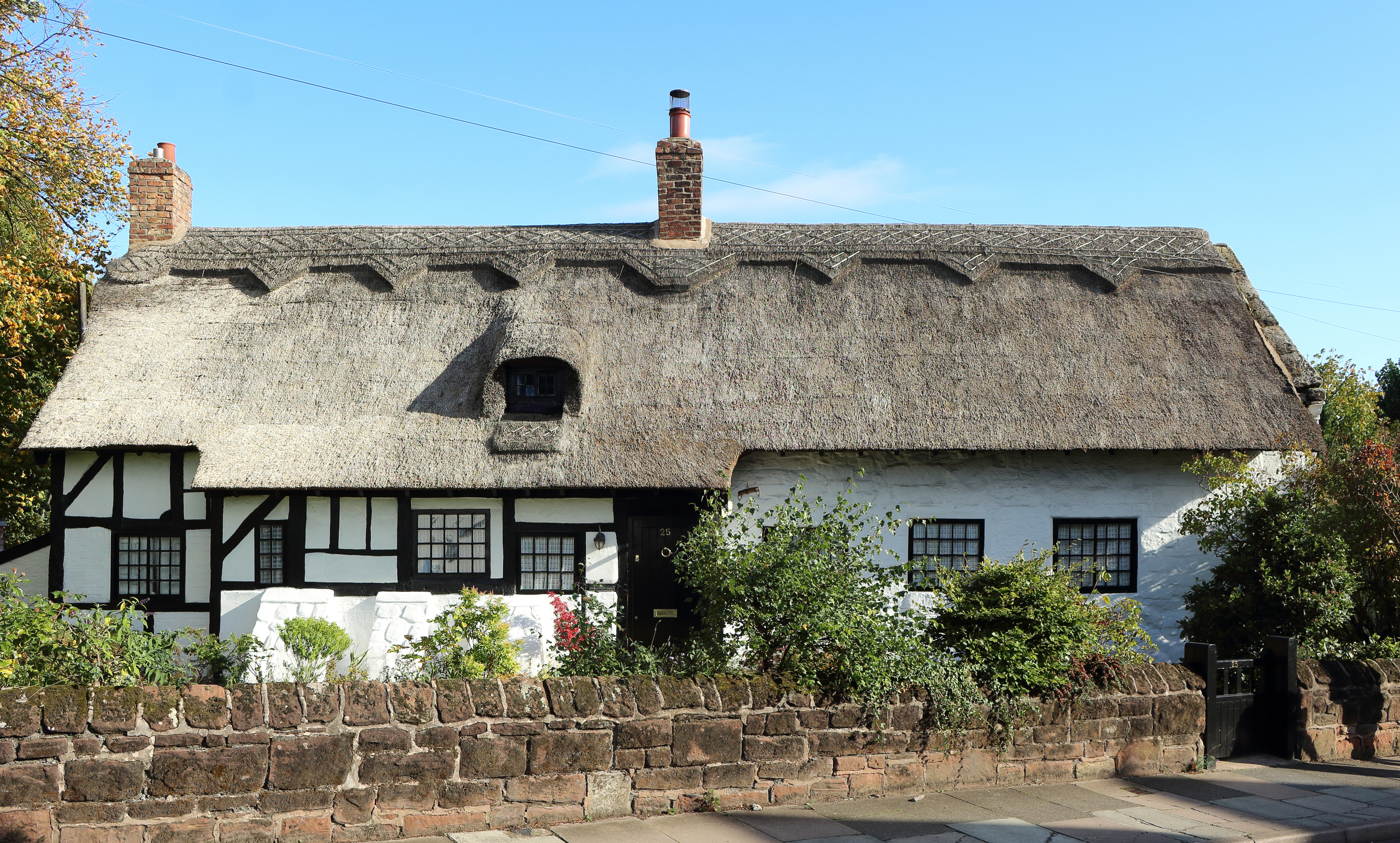
25 The Village, built in the 17th century when Lower Bebington was a small village

In 1801, Bebington was a small country hamlet with a population of only 273, situated on the main road connecting Chester and Birkenhead, and then via ferry to Liverpool. Up to 30 horse-drawn coaches would pass by each day. By 1840, the Birkenhead to Chester railway was running and in 1844 the New Chester Road opened and Bebington lost its coaching traffic.

In 1838, the footprints of an archosaur later called the Chirotherium storetonese were found in a sandstone bed at Storeton Quarry. Examples can be seen at the Liverpool Museum and at Christ Church within the parish of Higher Bebington. Also a small example can be seen at Higher Bebington Junior School, in their reception area.

Stone quarried at Bebington was used for the construction of Birkenhead Town Hall, some of the villas around Birkenhead and Rock Parks and most famously of all the Empire State Building in New York City. The stone is considered to be a high quality sandstone which is creamy in appearance. The quarries were eventually filled in with debris removed during the construction of the two Mersey Tunnels.

Mayer Hall, in Lower Bebington village, was formerly an art gallery built by Bebington philanthropist Joseph Mayer, a noted antiquarian, whose collection of Anglo-Saxon antiquaries helped in the development of British archaeology. He made Pennant House his home. It is still a community resource and boasts many of its original features.

== Geography ==
Bebington is on the eastern side of the Wirral Peninsula, approximately 10 km (6.2 mi) south-south-east of the Irish Sea at New Brighton, about 7.5 km (4.7 mi) east-north-east of the Dee Estuary at Gayton and less than 2 km (1.2 mi) west-north-west of the River Mersey at New Ferry. The area is situated at an elevation of between 20–60 m (66–197 ft) above sea level.

== Governance ==
There is one main tier of local government covering Bebington, at metropolitan borough level: Wirral Council. The council is a member of the Liverpool City Region Combined Authority, which is led by the directly-elected Mayor of the Liverpool City Region.

=== Administrative history ===
Bebington was an ancient parish in the Wirral Hundred of Cheshire. The parish was subdivided into five townships, called Higher Bebington, Lower Bebington, Poulton cum Spital, Storeton, and Tranmere. The original parish church, St Andrew's, is at Lower Bebington. From the 17th century onwards, parishes were gradually given various civil functions under the poor laws, in addition to their original ecclesiastical functions. In some cases, including Bebington, the civil functions were exercised by each township separately rather than the parish as a whole. In 1866, the legal definition of 'parish' was changed to be the areas used for administering the poor laws, and so each township became a separate civil parish.

Local government districts, each governed by an elected local board, were established in 1859 for Higher Bebington, in 1860 for Tranmere, and in 1863 for Lower Bebington. The Tranmere district was abolished in 1877 and its area incorporated into the borough of Birkenhead. Port Sunlight was developed from 1888 on land within the Lower Bebington district.

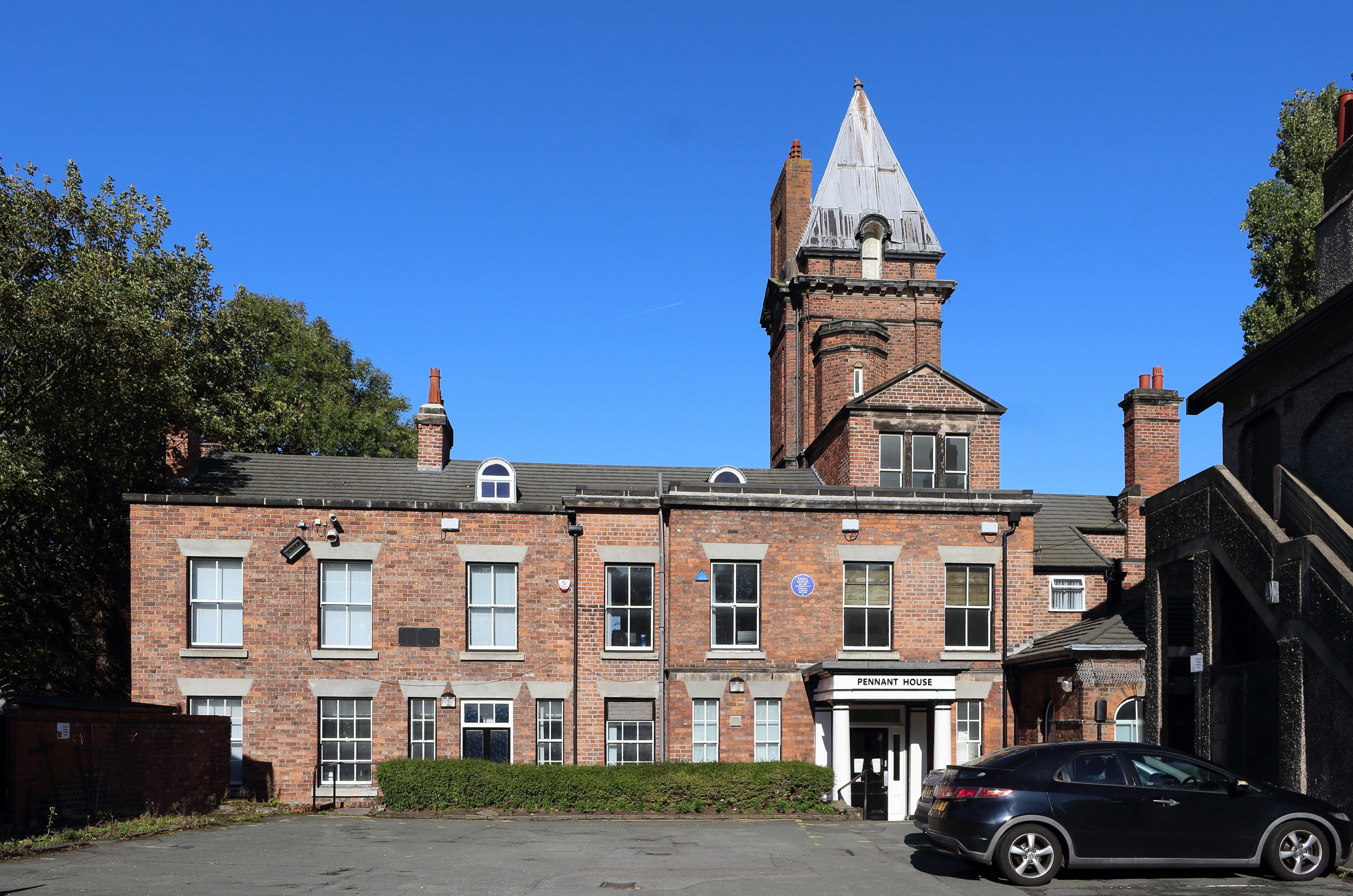
Pennant House

Local government districts were reconstituted as urban districts under the Local Government Act 1894. Lower Bebington Urban District Council bought Pennant House to serve as its headquarters in 1901, using the adjoining Mayer Hall as its council chamber.

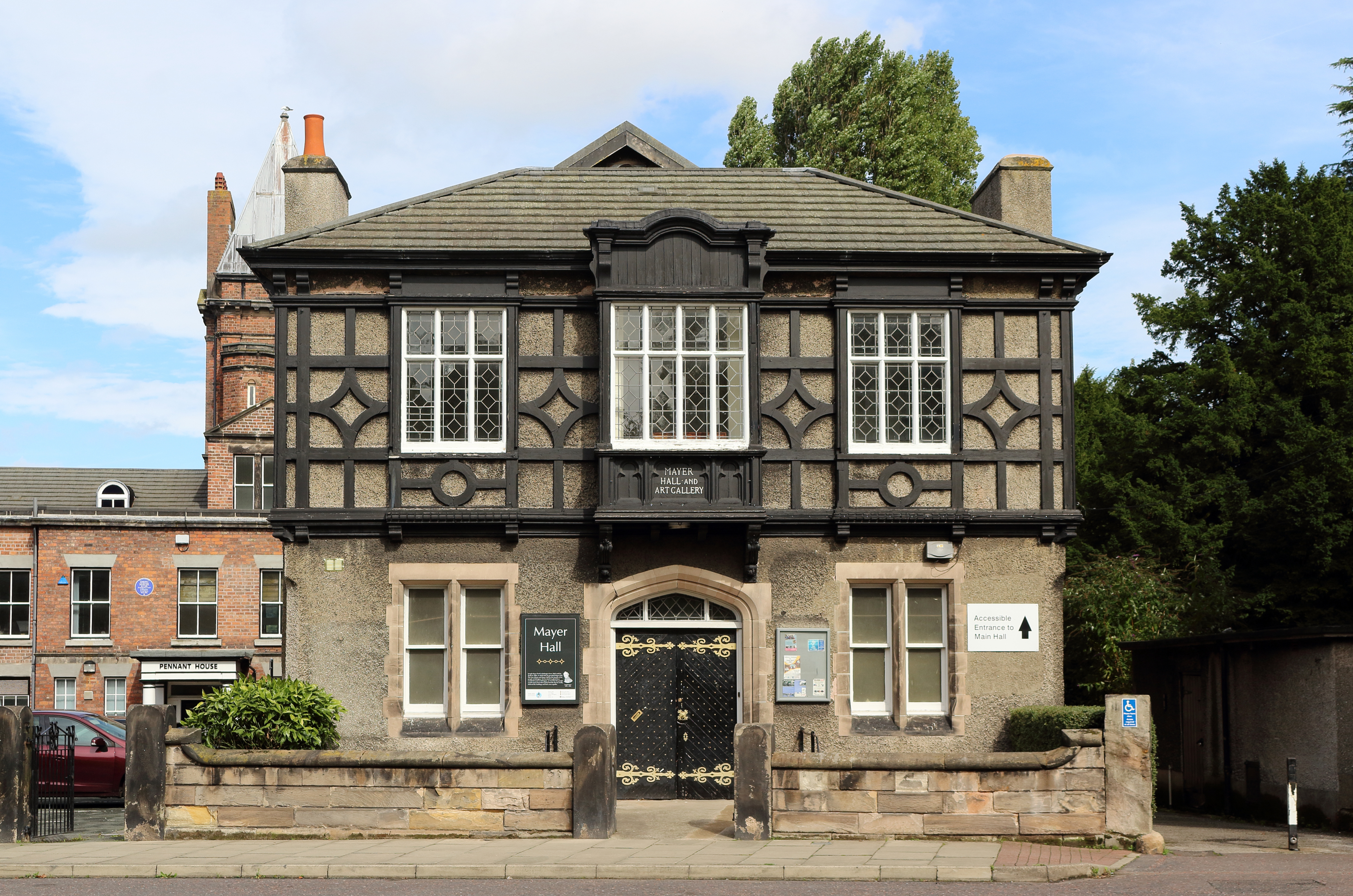
Mayer Hall

The three urban districts of Lower Bebington, Higher Bebington and neighbouring Bromborough to the south were merged into a single Bebington and Bromborough Urban District in 1922. The urban district was renamed Bebington in 1933, when its territory was also significantly enlarged to take in the neighbouring parishes of Storeton, Poulton cum Spital, Brimstage, Thornton Hough, Raby, and Eastham. The urban district council was granted a coat of arms in 1934. Bebington Urban District was raised to the status of a municipal borough in 1937.

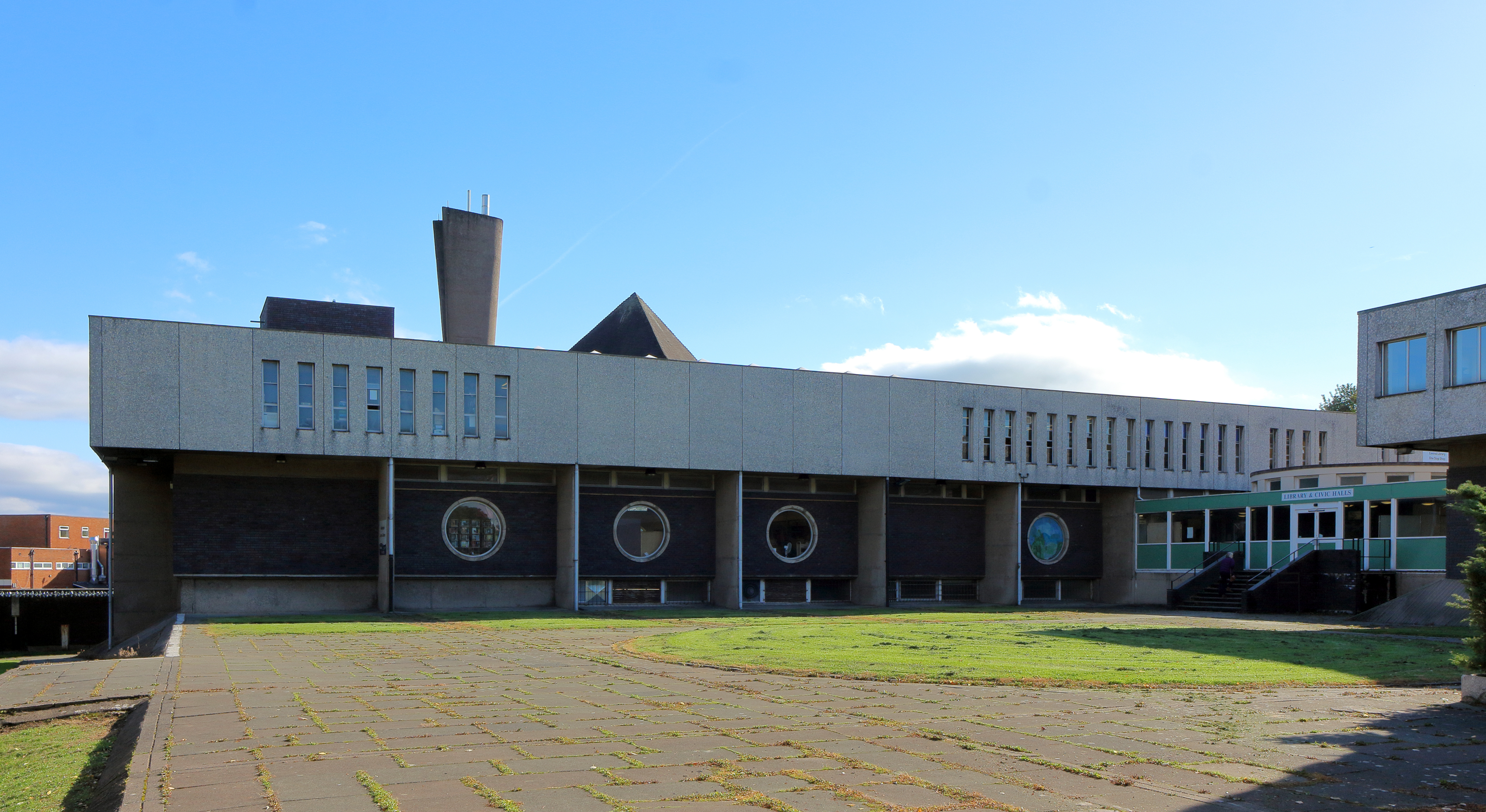
Bebington Central Library, completed 1971 as part of the Civic Centre complex

A new Town Hall was built opposite Pennant House in 1955 as one of the first phases of a wider civic centre. The borough council continued to meet at Mayer Hall until a new council chamber was completed in 1971 as one of the later phases of the civic centre complex, forming part of the same building as Bebington Central Library.

The borough of Bebington was abolished in 1974 under the Local Government Act 1972. The area became part of the Metropolitan Borough of Wirral in the new county of Merseyside.

== Education ==
Bebington contains ten main schools; Wirral Grammar School for Boys, Wirral Grammar School for Girls, St John Plessington Catholic College, St John's Junior and Infant Schools, Higher Bebington Junior School, Co-op Academy Bebington, Brackenwood Junior School, Stanton Road Primary School, St Andrew's Primary School, Town Lane Infants School, Church Drive Primary School.

== Cultural references ==
The Oval Sports Centre was used in the film, Chariots of Fire, to portray the 1924 Colombes Olympic Stadium in Paris.

== Warship Week WW2 ==
In March 1942 after a successful ‘Warship Week’ National Savings campaign HMS Sabre (H18) was adopted by the civil community of Bebington, Cheshire, the same month she was detached for escort of the Russian Convoy PQ 13 during its initial stage of passage to Iceland in the Northwest Approaches.

== Notable people ==
- Liz Carr, actress and disability rights activist was born (in 1972) in Port Sunlight, Bebington
- Frances Jacson, novelist (1754–1842), was born in Bebington.
- Lottie Dod (1871–1960), "the most versatile female athlete of all time" and five times Wimbledon tennis champion, was born in Bebington.
- Professional footballer Dixie Dean (1907–1980), lived in Higher Bebington.
- Michael Goodliffe (1914–1976), film and television actor was born in Bebington.
- The historian and antiquarian Hilda R. Ellis Davidson (1914–2006) was born in Bebington.
- Harold Wilson (1916–1995), British Prime Minister, lived in the area from the age of 16 and was head boy at Wirral Grammar School.
- The authors Roger Lancelyn Green (1918–1987) and son Richard Lancelyn Green (1953–2004) lived in Poulton Lancelyn, Bebington.
- Kenneth Halliwell (1926–1967), partner and murderer of playwright Joe Orton, was born in Heath Road and attended Wirral Grammar School.
- Professional footballer Brian Harris (1935–2008), was born in Bebington.
- Phil Liggett, cycling commentator, was born in Bebington in 1943.
- David Mather (born 1975), cricketer
- Carl Rees (born 1943), head coach of American Fairfield Stags men's soccer team
- Film director Alex Cox was born in Bebington in 1954.
- Ted Robbins (born 1955), entertainer and actor, was a resident of the town.
- Jan Ravens, impressionist and actress, born in Bebington in 1958.
- Singer Pete Burns, (1959–2016) was born in Port Sunlight, Bebington.
- Chris Sharrock, ex Icicle Works, Oasis and current Beady Eye drummer, born in Bebington in 1964.
- Chris Malkin, former professional footballer, was born in Bebington in 1967.
- Paul Nowak, trade unionist, born in Bebington in 1972
- Professional rugby player Matt Cairns (born 1979) was brought up in Spital and went to Wirral Grammar School for Boys.
- Dom Phillips, born Bebington in 1964, journalist killed in Brazil in 2022
- Jean Boht (1932–2023), English actress, most famous for playing Nellie Boswell in Carla Lane's sitcom Bread.
- Mike Farnworth, Canadian politician, Member for the Riding of Port Coquitlam in British Columbia, was born in Bebington in 1959.
- Harold Sanderson, shipowner and businessman, was born in Bebington in 1859

== See also ==
- Listed buildings in Bebington
- Bebington parliamentary constituency (1950 – Feb 1974)
- Bebington and Ellesmere Port parliamentary constituency (Feb 1974 – 1983)
- Category:People from Bebington

== Bibliography ==
- Mortimer, William Williams (1847). The History of the Hundred of Wirral. London: Whittaker & Co. pp180-189.
