= Co-op Academy Bebington =

Location
- Higher Bebington Road; Bebington, Merseyside, CH63 2PS; England; 53°21′09″N 3°00′56″W

Information
- Former names: Bebington High Sports College (2004–2019); Bebington High School (1915–2004)
- Type: Academy
- Established: 1915
- Local authority: Wirral Council
- Trust: Co-op Academies Trust
- Department for Education URN: 146315 Tables
- Ofsted: Reports
- Head teacher: Jane Whisker
- Gender: Mixed
- Age range: 11–18
- Capacity: 1,256
- Website: bebington.coopacademies.co.uk

Co-op Academy Bebington (formerly Bebington High Sports College and Bebington High School) is an 11–18 mixed, secondary school and sixth form with academy status in Bebington, Merseyside, England. It was established in 1915 and adopted its present name after becoming an academy in April 2019. It is part of the Co-op Academies Trust.

== History ==
Bebington High School opened in 1915 in order to train future recruits during the height of World War I. The school has remained open since the end of World War I. It was renamed as Bebington High Sports College in 2004; it was a foundation school administered by Wirral Metropolitan Borough Council and a charitable foundation trust. Partners of the sports college included Liverpool John Moores University, Barnardo's and Tranmere Rovers F.C. The school was designated a specialist Sports College in 2001.

There was an inspection in 2006 that described Bebington High Sports College, as an average-sized comprehensive school situated in a residential area of the Wirral, some parts of which have significant levels of social and economic disadvantage. The number of students then eligible for free school meals was over a quarter, twice the national average. 20% of students, had learning difficulties and/or disabilities: of these, 27 had a formal SEN statement.

The college had a long history of underperforming. In 2013, it was put into special measures. Wirral replaced the school’s governing body with an interim executive board. The 2017 inspection judged the school as Requiring Improvement.

In April 2019, it became an academy as part of the Co-op Academies Trust and renamed as Co-op Academy Bebington.

== Academics ==
As Bebington High Sports College, it offered GCSEs and BTECs as programmes of study for pupils while students in the sixth form have the option to study from a range of A-levels and further BTECs.
