= Listed buildings in Merseyside =

As of January 2026, there are 3,080 listed buildings in Merseyside. The term "listed building", in the United Kingdom, refers to a building or structure designated as being of special architectural, historical, or cultural significance. Details of all the listed buildings are contained in the National Heritage List for England. They are categorised in three grades: Grade I consists of buildings of outstanding architectural or historical interest, Grade II* includes significant buildings of more than local interest and Grade II consists of buildings of special architectural or historical interest. Buildings in England are listed by the Secretary of State for Culture, Media and Sport on recommendations provided by English Heritage, which also determines the grading.

Some listed buildings are looked after by the National Trust or English Heritage while others are in private ownership or administered by trusts.

== Listed buildings by grade ==
- Grade I listed buildings in Merseyside
- Grade II* listed buildings in Merseyside

== Listed buildings by district or unitary authority ==
Within each local government district, buildings are listed by civil parish or unparished area.

=== Knowsley ===
- Listed buildings in Halewood
- Listed buildings in Huyton with Roby
- Listed buildings in Kirkby
- Listed buildings in Knowsley, Merseyside
- Listed buildings in Prescot
- Listed buildings in Tarbock
- Listed buildings in Whiston, Merseyside

=== Liverpool ===
- Listed buildings in Liverpool
- Grade II listed buildings in Liverpool-L1
- Grade II listed buildings in Liverpool-L2
- Grade II listed buildings in Liverpool-L3
- Grade II listed buildings in Liverpool-L4
- Grade II listed buildings in Liverpool-L5
- Grade II listed buildings in Liverpool-L6
- Grade II listed buildings in Liverpool-L7
- Grade II listed buildings in Liverpool-L8
- Grade II listed buildings in Liverpool-L9
- Grade II listed buildings in Liverpool-L10
- Grade II listed buildings in Liverpool-L11
- Grade II listed buildings in Liverpool-L12
- Grade II listed buildings in Liverpool-L13
- Grade II listed buildings in Liverpool-L14
- Grade II listed buildings in Liverpool-L15
- Grade II listed buildings in Liverpool-L16
- Grade II listed buildings in Liverpool-L17
- Grade II listed buildings in Liverpool-L18
- Grade II listed buildings in Liverpool-L19
- Grade II listed buildings in Liverpool-L24
- Grade II listed buildings in Liverpool-L25

=== Sefton ===
- Listed buildings in Aintree Village
- Listed buildings in Birkdale
- Listed buildings in Blundellsands
- Listed buildings in Bootle
- Listed buildings in Churchtown, Merseyside
- Listed buildings in Formby
- Listed buildings in Great Crosby
- Listed buildings in Hightown, Merseyside
- Listed buildings in Ince Blundell
- Listed buildings in Litherland
- Listed buildings in Little Altcar
- Listed buildings in Little Crosby
- Listed buildings in Lydiate
- Listed buildings in Maghull
- Listed buildings in Melling, Merseyside
- Listed buildings in Sefton, Merseyside
- Listed buildings in Southport
- Listed buildings in Thornton, Merseyside

=== St Helens ===
- Listed buildings in Billinge, Merseyside
- Listed buildings in Bold, St Helens
- Listed buildings in Cronton
- Listed buildings in Eccleston, St Helens
- Listed buildings in Rainford
- Listed buildings in Rainhill
- Listed buildings in Seneley Green
- Listed buildings in St Helens, Merseyside

=== Wirral ===
- Listed buildings in Bebington
- Listed buildings in Bidston
- Listed buildings in Birkenhead
- Listed buildings in Bromborough
- Listed buildings in Bromborough Pool
- Listed buildings in Claughton, Merseyside
- Listed buildings in Eastham, Merseyside
- Listed buildings in Gayton, Merseyside
- Listed buildings in Heswall
- Listed buildings in Hoylake
- Listed buildings in Irby, Merseyside
- Listed buildings in New Brighton, Merseyside
- Listed buildings in Noctorum
- Listed buildings in Oxton, Merseyside
- Listed buildings in Port Sunlight
- Listed buildings in Poulton, Bebington
- Listed buildings in Prenton
- Listed buildings in Raby, Merseyside
- Listed buildings in Rock Ferry
- Listed buildings in Saughall Massie
- Listed buildings in Storeton
- Listed buildings in Thornton Hough
- Listed buildings in Thurstaston
- Listed buildings in Tranmere, Merseyside
- Listed buildings in Upton, Merseyside
- Listed buildings in Wallasey
- Listed buildings in Woodchurch, Merseyside
- Listed buildings in Woodside, Merseyside
