= Grade II listed buildings in Liverpool-L11 =

Liverpool is a city and port in Merseyside, England, which contains many listed buildings. A listed building is a structure designated by English Heritage of being of architectural and/or of historical importance and, as such, is included in the National Heritage List for England. There are three grades of listing, according to the degree of importance of the structure. Grade I includes those buildings that are of "exceptional interest, sometimes considered to be internationally important"; the buildings in Grade II* are "particularly important buildings of more than special interest"; and those in Grade II are "nationally important and of special interest". Very few buildings are included in Grade I — only 2.5% of the total. Grade II* buildings represent 5.5% of the total, while the great majority, 92%, are included in Grade II.

Liverpool contains more than 1,550 listed buildings, of which 28 are in Grade I, 109 in Grade II*, and the rest in Grade II. (Note: These figures are taken from a search in the National Heritage List for England in May 2013, and are subject to variation as further buildings are listed, grades are revised, or buildings are delisted.) This list contains the two Grade II listed buildings in the L11 postal district of Liverpool, a former lodge, and the stable block of a demolished mansion. Elsewhere in the district is West Derby Cemetery which has three Grade II listed buildings around its main entrance.

Grade II listed buildings from other areas in the city can be found through the box on the right, along with the lists of the Grade I and Grade II* buildings in the city.

== Buildings ==
Name	Location	Photograph	Built	Notes
Lodge, West Derby Cemetery	Lower House Lane; 53.4512°N 2.9152°W	—	1884	The lodge is at the main entrance to the cemetery, and was designed by F. Bartram Payton. It is built in stone, is in two storeys, and has a front facing the drive of three bays. The first two bays project forward, and have gables of different sizes. In the first bay is a bay window, with another bay window on the front facing the road. There is also a half-dormer.
Northfield and Office, West Derby Cemetery	Lower House Lane; 53.4514°N 2.9158°W	—	1881	This was originally the registrar's office and residence; it was designed by F. Bartram Payton. It is built in sandstone with a hipped slate roof. It has two storeys and a main front of five irregular bays. Most of the windows are mullioned and transomed. Its features include bay windows, a half-dormer, and an oriel window. In the right bay is a tower with buttresses, lancet windows, clock faces on all sides, an open arcaded bell stage, and a pyramidal roof with a weathercock.
West entrance, West Derby Cemetery	Lower House Lane; 53.45121°N 2.91561°W		1884	The entrance contains five stone piers and wrought iron gates. The central pier is the largest, and has arched recesses flanked by colonnettes. On the corners are small turrets with truncated spires. On the top is a broach spire with a fleuron. The other, smaller piers have flat buttresses, and truncated pyramidal caps with gablets.
Gillmoss Lodge	Gillmoss Close; 53.45686°N 2.90177°W	—	c. 1860s	The lodge was probably designed by John Douglas. It is built in brick with stone dressings, and has a slate roof with tiles on the crest. The lodge is in a single storeys, with a front of two bays. In the second bay is a canted bay window with a hipped roof. Around the entrance is a timber gable on a stone plinth, with a stone bench on the left.
Stable block, Norris Green Park	Lorenzo Drive; 53.43810°N 2.91870°W		Mid 19th century	The stable block is all that remains of the former Norris Green mansion, which was demolished in the 1930s. It is built in brick with stone dressings and has a slate roof. The block is in two storeys, and has a front of five bays. The central bay projects forward and contains a carriage entrance, above which is a pediment with a coat of arms. The other bays contain blind lunettes in the upper floor. Along the top of the block is a frieze and a cornice.

== See also ==
Architecture of Liverpool

== References and notes ==
Notes

Citations

Sources

- Pollard, Richard; Pevsner, Nikolaus (2006). Lancashire: Liverpool and the South-West.
