= Grant Gardens =

Park in Liverpool

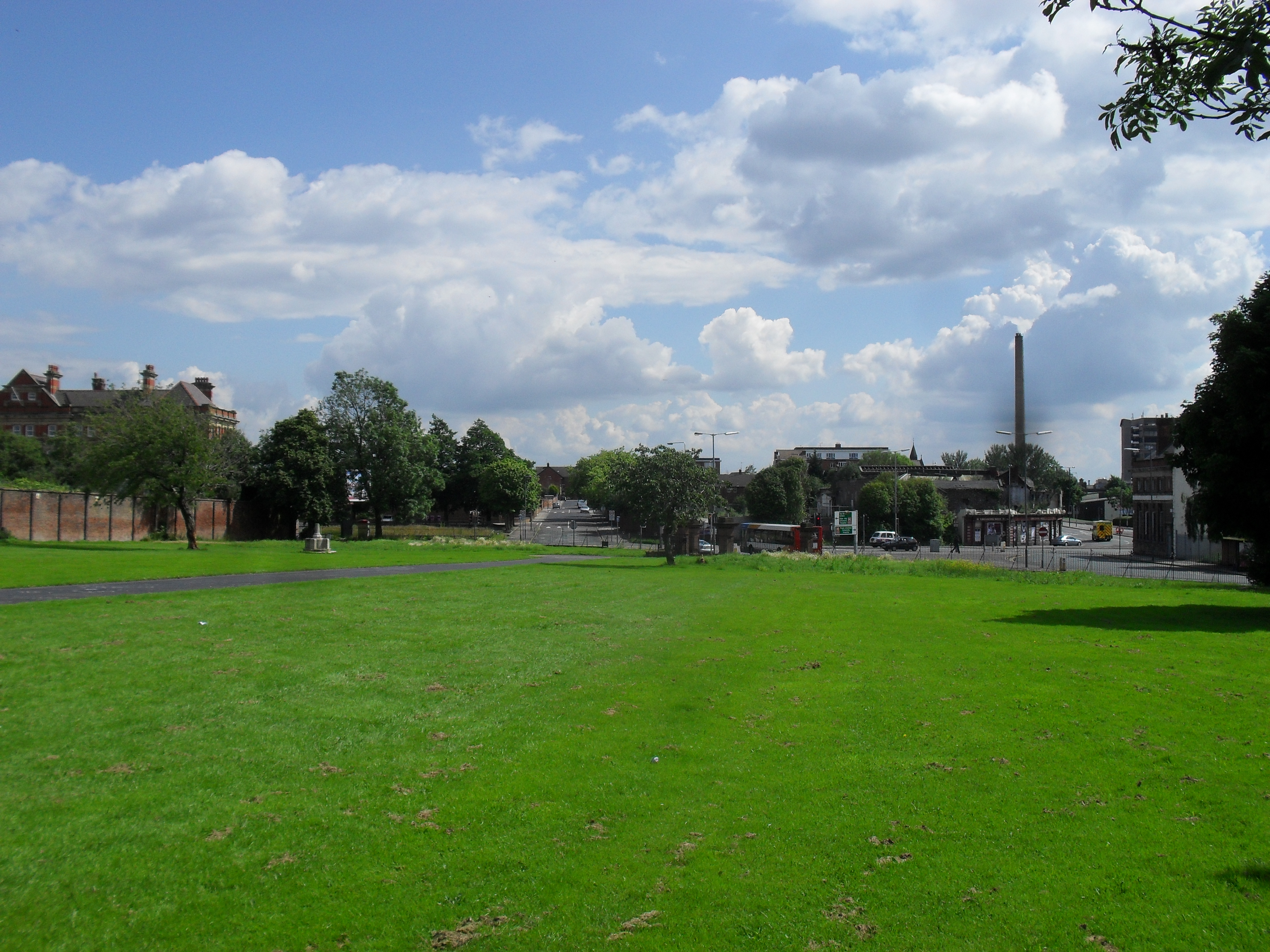
- Interactive map of Grant Gardens
- Type: Public park
- Location: Liverpool
- Coordinates: 53.4155°N 2.9623°W
- Area: 5 acres (0.020 km^{2})
- Created: 22 April 1914
- Operator: Liverpool City Council
- Status: Open all year round

Grant Gardens, previously Liverpool Necropolis, is a park and former cemetery in Liverpool, United Kingdom. It is named after Alderman J. R. Grant, J.P, chairman of the Corporation Parks and Gardens Committee.

The Necropolis opened in 1825, with buildings by John Foster Jr, it closed in 1898 and was transferred to the council who reopened it as a park in 1914. While the memorials and structures above ground have been removed, the graves themselves are intact.

== Closure and location of memorials ==
On 31 August 1898, Liverpool's Necropolis Cemetery (Low Hill/Everton), was closed, due to an edict of the City Council, citing the unsanitary conditions spreading to surrounding neighbourhoods, plus the fact that the Cemetery was nearing its full capacity of 80,000 burials. The old headstones were 'dropped' over the graves, and subsequently landscaped in the early 1910s, to make Grant Gardens a public park, which was opened by City Alderman J.R.Grant in 1914.

Headstones from 'active' private plots at the Necropolis were relocated to Everton Cemetery. The majority of standing Necropolis Headstones at Everton Cemetery are in the centre of Section GEN6; however, there are a few of these headstones placed in other religious denomination sections of the Cemetery.

== Notable burials ==
- Hugh Stowell Brown
- Daniel James (businessman)
- Thomas Raffles abolitionist and minister.
- Nelly Weeton diarist and traveller, 1776-1849
