= Cronton =

Coordinates: 53.391°N 2.758°W

- Village
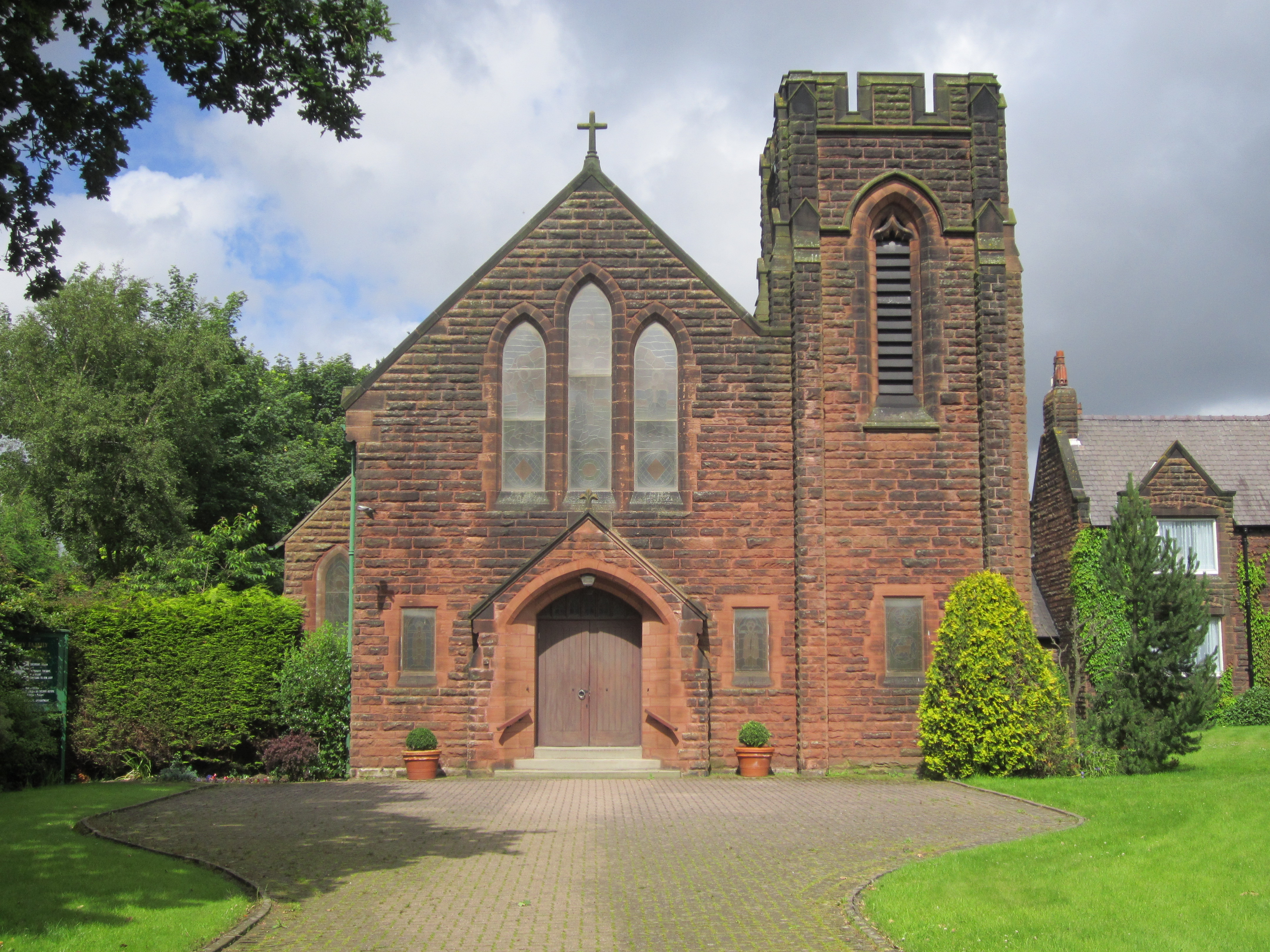
- Holy Family Church, Cronton

- Location within Merseyside
- Population: 1,379
- OS grid reference: SJ495885
  - London: 171 mi (275 km)SE
- Civil parish: Cronton
- Metropolitan borough: Knowsley
- Metropolitan county: Merseyside
- Region: North West
- Country: England
- Sovereign state: United Kingdom
- Post town: WIDNES
- Postcode district: WA8
- Dialling code: 0151
- Police: Merseyside
- Fire: Merseyside
- Ambulance: North West
- UK Parliament: St Helens South and Whiston

Cronton is a village and civil parish within the Metropolitan Borough of Knowsley, Merseyside, in England. The village is surrounded by green belt land. Over the county border in Cheshire, Widnes town centre is 2.3 miles (3.7 km) to the south-southeast.

== History ==
Historically a part of Lancashire, Cronton is an ancient village and was once a centre for the makers of watch parts and movements. There is an ancient cross, now no more than a column of stone on ruined steps. This was one of many stopping places on the way to the parish church at Farnworth. The five-holed stocks next to the war memorial in Coronation Gardens are almost unique to Cronton with few other specimens found anywhere. Many of the 19th Century residents of Cronton were farmers. There was a blacksmith in Cronton Lane (opposite what is now The Dandelion Tavern, formerly The Black Horse pub). Family names common in Cronton during the 19th Century census returns: Leather, Haughton, Pitt, Coughlin, Critchley, Dwerryhouse, Atherton, Hillyer, Glover and Lister. The Catholic Church, Holy Family, was opened at the start of the 20th century. There is also Holy Family Primary school. Prior to this, many Cronton Catholics were carried to St Bartholomew's Church, Rainhill for burial.

In the early twentieth century, Cronton was "a favourite resort for cyclists and picnic parties, both from Liverpool and Widnes, on account of a public recreation ground on Pexhill. This hill, rising to only 200 ft (61 m) above sea level, is covered with heather and gorse, and on the top are the Widnes Corporation reservoirs, formed in 1868". Today the Liverpool Astronomical Society has an Observatory – Leighton Observatory – at Pex Hill. It was formerly known as Pex Hill Observatory and Visitors' Centre.

The village has grown since the 1950s but in recent years has slowed with very little new housing development as it is surrounded by Green Belt. The village has two primary schools and just over the border in Widnes is Riverside College (formerly Widnes sixth-form college and then renamed Widnes and Runcorn sixth-form college with the advent of another campus being added in Runcorn), and locally referred to as "Cronton College" as the site directly borders Cronton.

Two pubs are located in the village, The Unicorn and The Dandelion Tavern (formerly The Black Horse ). Cronton is the location of Pex Hill JFC which is a fast-growing junior football club that utilises the Holy Family Club as its social club. It is also the home of Cronton Villa F.C who play in the Warrington and District league.

Nearby stood Cronton Colliery which ceased production in March 1984, shortly before the Great UK miners' strike (1984–1985). Although Cronton 'pit' was a twentieth century enterprise, the surrounding area had supported a coal mining industry throughout the previous century. It was in the 19th century that a large number of Welsh people moved nearby to work 'down the pit' and they brought their distinctive brand of Non-Conformist Christianity with them. There were once at least 31 non-conformist chapels within just three miles (5 km) of Cronton, including three Welsh chapels (Congregational, Methodist and Presbyterian) in Widnes, Welsh Calvinistic Methodists in Huyton Quarry, and a Welsh Methodist in Whiston. Methodism was especially strong in coal-mining communities and Cronton had its own Wesleyan Methodist chapel in Chapel Lane. This chapel still exists and now forms part of the Liverpool District (Widnes Circuit) of the Methodist Church.

=== Cronton Colliery ===
Cronton colliers mined the pit's first coal during the Great War in 1915. Cronton thrived and the pit was one of 65 Lancashire collieries at the time of nationalisation. Mainly because of the exhaustion of economically viable reserves, the number of Lancashire collieries had been reduced to 41 by 1962. Five years later this had fallen to 21. By the time Cronton colliery finally closed in 1984 it had been making heavy financial losses for many years and the remaining coal reserves were both limited and difficult to mine. Local coal miners were offered alternative jobs at one of the seven remaining Lancashire collieries. (The last Lancashire deep-pit to close was Parkside Colliery in 1993).

The 43 hectare colliery site lay completely derelict for years until it was acquired by English Partnerships, the government's national regeneration agency, as part of the National Coalfield Programme. In 1995 the site was partially restored by removing both the colliery infrastructure and major earthworks, and then reclaiming colliery spoil by mixing it with paper mill crumb (provided by Brigewater newsprint mill in Ellesmere Port) and sewage cake to create soils for successful woodland planting.

The colliery site's ownership was transferred to the Northwest Regional Development Agency in 1999 but it will pass the Land Reclamation Trust in the autumn of 2007. The site has a future as public access land, probably as a new country park. To help improve nutrient-poor topsoil conditions, which are currently hindering plant development, compost made from recycled garden waste will be added. The aim is to help improve local biodiversity; establish sustainable, low-maintenance native plant communities; and encourage natural wildlife habitats.

== Governance ==
Since 1 April 1974, Cronton has been one of six civil parishes within the Metropolitan Borough of Knowsley, in the metropolitan county of Merseyside, and its boundaries fall within the Whiston South ward for election of Borough councillors. From 1894 until the local government reorganisation of 1974, Cronton was part of Whiston Rural District within the administrative county of Lancashire. Before this Cronton was a township and civil parish, part of the Ecclesiastical Parish of Prescot in West Derby Hundred within the historic county boundaries of Lancashire.

== Transport links ==
Cronton village is on the A5080, which links Edge Hill in Liverpool to Penketh on the outskirts of Warrington. It lies 1.1 miles (1.8 km) from Junction 7 on the M62 motorway. Hough Green railway station, on the Liverpool to Warrington line, is 1.4 miles (2.3 km) away. There are also bus links between Liverpool city centre and Warrington.

== See also ==
- Listed buildings in Cronton
