= Norman Tunna =

Norman Tunna GC
- Born: 29 April 1908; Birkenhead, Cheshire, England
- Died: 4 December 1970 (aged 62); Birkenhead, Cheshire, England
- Occupation: Railwayman
- Awards: George Cross

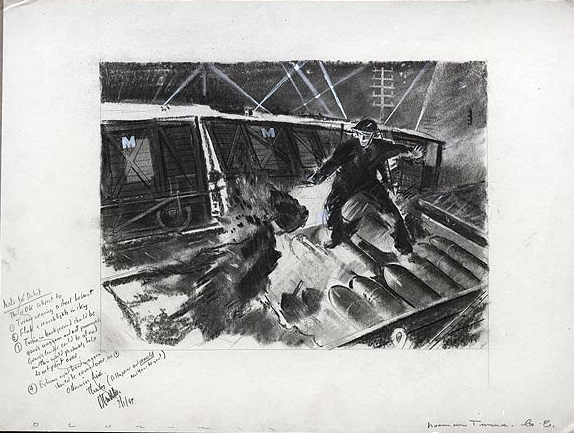
Line drawing of Tunna fighting the fire. Picture drawn in 1945 to illustrate a book on holders of the George Cross

Norman Tunna GC (29 April 1908 – 4 December 1970), a shunter for the Great Western Railway in Birkenhead was awarded the George Cross in 1941.

== Early life ==
Tunna was born in Birkenhead on 29 April 1908, the son of Charles and Emily Tunna, his father was a railway porter.

== George Cross award ==
On 26 September 1940, Tunna was at work at Morpeth Dock, Birkenhead when an air raid commenced. Ignoring the bombing, Tunna continued his work, marshalling a goods train where the main freight being carried was high explosive bombs for use by the Royal Air Force. While making a final inspection of the train before it departed, he came across one wagon laden with 250 pounds (110 kg) bombs alight due to a number of incendiary bombs having landed upon it. Fetching a bucket of water in an attempt to extinguish the fire, he was joined by the engine crew of the train and while they fetched more water, Tunna removed the wagonsheet hoping that this would also drag the incendiaries off the wagon. It did dislodge one but another fell into the wagon between some of the bombs. Tunna climbed into the wagon and prised the incendiary out, throwing it away from the wagon. He then joined the enginemen in pumping water over the wagon until they considered the bombs to have been cooled to a safe temperature.

Tunna's bravery in preventing what would have been a large explosion was rewarded by the award of the George Cross.

He was awarded the medal on 24 January 1941. The citation reads:-

The KING has been graciously pleased to award the GEORGE CROSS to:-

Norman Tunna, Shunter, Great Western Railway, Birkenhead.

Enemy action over Liverpool Port Area resulted in a number of serious fires involving railway and dock warehouse properties.
A large number of incendiary bombs fell on and about the goods station and sidings.
In the course of these events Shunter Tunna discovered two incendiary bombs burning in a sheeted open wagon, containing 250-lb bombs. With complete disregard for personal risk, Tunna removed the sheet, extinguished the incendiary bombs and removed them from the truck. The top layer of these heavy bombs was hot.

Tunna's action displayed courage in a very high degree and eliminated the risk of serious explosions, the result of which it would be difficult to measure.

== Memorials ==
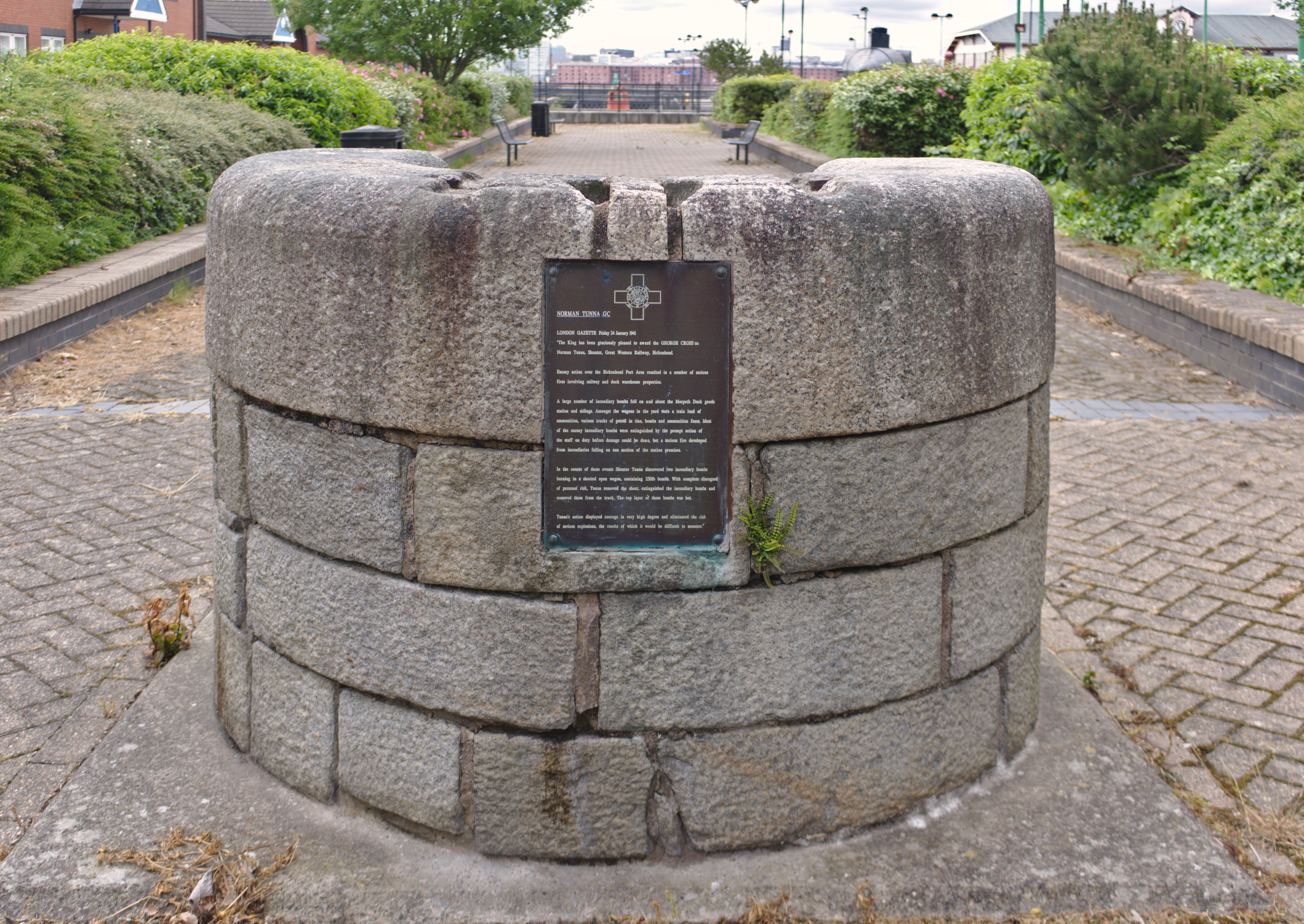
Memorial at Woodside

Between 15 November 1982 and July 1996, British Rail named Class 47 locomotive, 47471, after Tunna. The locomotive was named in a ceremony at Liverpool Lime Street railway station.

In September 2010 a plaque was unveiled at Birkenhead Central railway station by Merseyrail on the 70th anniversary of the heroic action.

An older memorial stands in the gardens at Woodside Ferry and Bus terminal, comprising a stone plinth bearing a plaque with the George Cross citation from the London Gazette engraved on it.
