= Grade II listed buildings in Liverpool-L9 =

Liverpool is a city and port in Merseyside, England, which contains many listed buildings. A listed building is a structure designated by English Heritage of being of architectural and/or of historical importance and, as such, is included in the National Heritage List for England. There are three grades of listing, according to the degree of importance of the structure. Grade I includes those buildings that are of "exceptional interest, sometimes considered to be internationally important"; the buildings in Grade II* are "particularly important buildings of more than special interest"; and those in Grade II are "nationally important and of special interest". Very few buildings are included in Grade I — only 2.5% of the total. Grade II* buildings represent 5.5% of the total, while the great majority, 92%, are included in Grade II.

Liverpool contains more than 1,550 listed buildings, of which 28 are in Grade I, 109 in Grade II*, and the rest in Grade II. (Note: These figures are taken from a search in the National Heritage List for England in May 2013, and are subject to variation as further buildings are listed, grades are revised, or buildings are delisted.) This list contains the Grade II listed buildings in the L9 postal district of Liverpool. The notable buildings in the district include the former Walton Hospital, Walton Prison, Hartley's Jam Factory, and structures associated with Everton Cemetery. Also included in the list are private homes, and two public houses, one of which originated as a bank.

Grade II listed buildings from other areas in the city can be found through the box on the right, along with the lists of the Grade I and Grade II* buildings in the city.

== Buildings ==
Name	Location	Photograph	Built	Notes
Chimney and engine house, Hartley's Factory	Hartley's Avenue; 53.46129°N 2.95382°W		1886	Most of the original jam factory has been demolished. This building consists of the original brick engine house, and a tall octagonal chimney with a cornice. It was designed by James F. Doyle.
Dining Hall, Hartley's Factory	Hartley's Avenue; 53.4610°N 2.9532°W		1895	The former dining hall for the factory workers is constructed in brick with stone dressings and has a tiled roof. It is in a single storey with a cellar, and extends for five bays. The central three bays contain large round-headed two-light windows with two transoms, and the outer bays have smaller windows with one transom. Above the central bays are three joined shaped gables decorated with festoons and a tree.
Entrance, Hartley's Factory	Hartley's Avenue; 53.46134°N 2.95270°W		1886	The entrance to the former jam factory consists of a Baroque style arch between round turrets, flanked by wings leading to pavilions. The pavilions have fronts of three bays, with a pediment over the central bays. At the top of each pavilion is a corbelled parapet with urns on the corners. The entrances to the pavilions are flanked by pairs of pilasters with Corinthian capitals.
Higher Lane Entrance, Everton Cemetery	Higher Lane; 53.45986°N 2.93872°W	—	1869	The entrance consists of four sandstone gate piers with gabled buttresses and finials. The gates are in wrought iron and consist of a pair of gates in the centre, and single gates at the sides.
Lodge, Everton Cemetery	Higher Lane; 53.4597°N 2.9385°W	—	1869	The lodge is built in sandstone and has a slate roof. It is in two storeys and has an L-shaped plan, with a porch in the angle. The windows have ogee heads, and most contain two or three lights. Above the entrance is a parapet and stone coped gables with iron finials.
West Lodge, Everton Cemetery	Higher Lane; 53.45967°N 2.93898°W	—	1869	The lodge is built in sandstone and has a slate roof. It is in two storeys and has an L-shaped plan, with a porch in the angle. The windows have ogee heads, and most contain two or three lights. One bay has a rectangular plan and a lean-to roof, the other is canted with a hipped roof.
—	27 Holmefield Road; 53.36706°N 2.92043°W	—	Mid 19th century	A stuccoed house with a slate roof in cottage orné style. It has two storeys and is in three bays, the central bay projecting forwards under a shaped gable, and containing a canted bay window. The third bay contains a niche with a statue, and there is another niche on the right side. The front of the house and the right side are decorated with the heads of dogs, a stag and a boar.
Gatehouse, Walton Prison	Hornby Road; 53.4573°N 2.96995°W		1848–55	The gatehouse was designed by John Weightman in Romanesque style. It is constructed in brick with stone dressings on a stone plinth. The building has four storeys and is in three bays. It has four square turrets with quoins, and embattled parapets. Above the round-headed entrance is a clock.
—	2–30 Hornby Road, 2 Hornby Place; 53.4581°N 2.9632°W	—	Mid 19th century	A terrace of 16 houses for workers at Walton Prison. They are in brick with stone dressings and slate roofs, and each house has two bays. Most houses have two storeys, other than the end houses and two in the middle of the terrace, which project and have three storeys. The other houses have bay windows. The windows are sashes under segmental heads.
—	32–54 Hornby Road, 1 Hornby Place; 53.4579°N 2.9643°W	—	Mid 19th century	A terrace of 13 houses for workers at Walton Prison. They are in brick with stone dressings and slate roofs, and each house has two bays. Most houses have two storeys, other than the right end house and two toward the middle of the terrace, which project and have three storeys. The other houses have bay windows. The windows are sashes under segmental heads.
—	69 Hornby Road; 53.4568°N 2.9703°W	—	Mid 19th century	This house is contained within the perimeter wall of Walton Prison and is for the use of the prison staff. It is stuccoed with a hipped slate roof. The house is in two storeys, and has an L-shaped plan with an extruded two-bay corner. The windows are sashes with architraves. The exterior is decorated with friezes and cornices.
Chapel, Everton Cemetery	Long Lane; 53.4559°N 2.9430°W	Everton Cemetery Chapel	1879	This is the only one of the three original chapels to have survived. It is built in stone with a slate roof, and consists of a four-bay nave, a short chancel, a vestry, and a northwest tower with a broach spire. The tower has a north entrance, paired bell openings, a frieze and a cornice, and gargoyles. On the spire are two tiers of lucarnes. The nave has a northeast entrance, and windows containing Geometrical tracery.
Long Lane Entrance, Everton Cemetery	Long Lane; 53.45548°N 2.94421°W	Gates to Everton Cemetery	1869	The entrance consists of four sandstone gate piers with gabled buttresses and finials. The gates are in wrought iron and consist of a pair of gates in the centre, and single gates at the sides.
Lodge, Everton Cemetery	Long Lane; 53.4554°N 2.9439°W		1879	The lodge is built in sandstone and has an extended corner with a hipped roof. It is in two storeys, and has three-light windows with ogee heads.
Walton Hospital	Rice Lane; 53.4511°N 2.9690°W		1864–68	This originated as a workhouse designed by William Culshaw, later becoming part of Walton Hospital, then converted into apartments. It is constructed in brick with stone dressings. It has three storeys, and extends for 56 bays. The central three bays project forward, and at the ends of the building are four-bay pedimented pavilions. The central bay forms a clock tower with a two-storey canted bay window at the base. Along the top of the rest of the building is a frieze, a cornice, and a pierced parapet.
Prince Arthur Public House	93 Rice Lane; 53.44975°N 2.96644°W		Mid 19th century	A public house that was remodelled in about 1900. It is built in brick with a slate roof. The façade is tiled on the ground floor, and above this is decorative brick work. The public house is in three storeys and has a trapezoidal plan. The entrances are framed by red tiles and have larvikite pilasters with terracotta capitals. The windows are sashes. Inside, much of the decorative plan and furnishing have been retained.
Barclays Bank	499 Rice Lane; 53.4614°N 2.9617°W		1898	Built as a branch of the Bank of Liverpool, later converted into a public house. It was designed by Willinck and Thicknesse, inspired by Norman Shaw. The building is constructed in brick with stone dressings and a slate roof. It has three storeys and is in three bays. Its features include an Ionic colonnade, friezes, Dutch gables, tourelles, obelisks, and cupolas.

== See also ==
Architecture of Liverpool
