= Storeton Hall =

Historic remains in Wirral, Merseyside, England

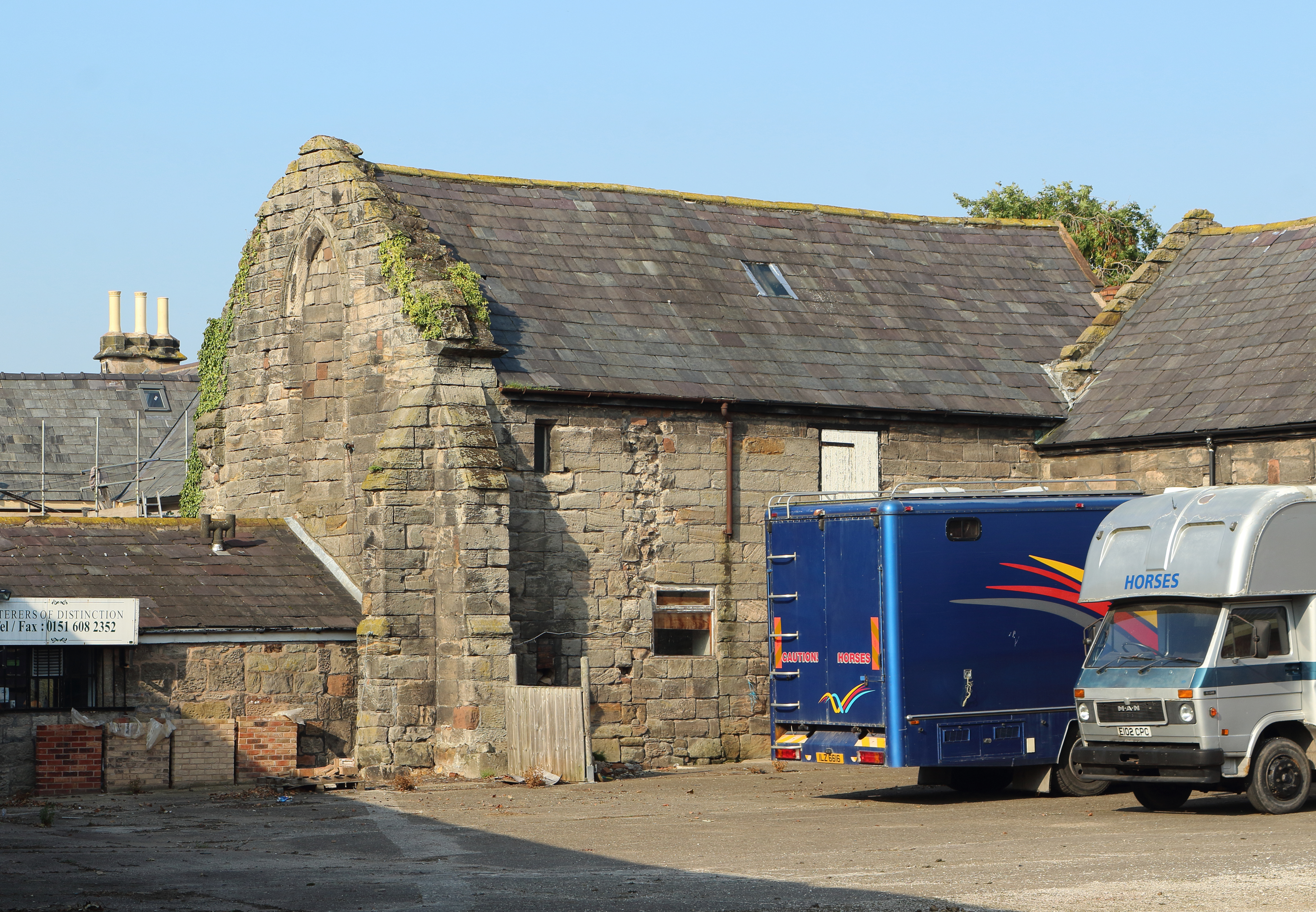
- The building in 2018

- Location in Merseyside

General information
- Location: Storeton, Wirral, Merseyside, England
- Coordinates: 53.3521°N 3.0453°W
- Year built: 14th century
- Client: William Stanley

Design and construction
- Designations

Listed Building – Grade II*
- Official name: Storeton Hall
- Designated: 27 December 1962
- Reference no.: 1075385

Storeton Hall was a country house in the village of Storeton, Wirral, Merseyside, England. It was built in the 14th century for the Stanley family and consisted of a H-shaped building including a great hall. Only the north wing, a wall of the great hall, and a block between them that contained a chapel, have survived, and have been incorporated into farm buildings. The remains of the hall are recorded in the National Heritage List for England as a designated Grade II* listed building.

== History ==
The manor of Storeton came into the possession of the Stanley family, the predecessors of the Earls of Derby, in the 13th century. Prior to this the settlement was inhabited from Viking times along with other sites in the area following the Viking expulsion from Dublin in the 10th century. It has a key strategic loci at the center of the Wirral peninsula but to date, has not benefitted from a detailed archaeological survey that the history of the site warranted. William Stanley built the hall in the late 14th century, and until about 1480 it was the principal residence of the family. The hall had a H-plan with a great hall, a north wing containing chambers on two storeys, a south service wing, and a block containing a chapel on the ground floor at the corner of the north wing and the great hall. Extensive remains of the hall have been incorporated into farm buildings of Storeton Hall Farm.

== Architecture ==
The hall was built with sandstone from Storeton Quarry. Nothing remains of the south service wing. The north wing, the block containing the chapel, and the east wall of the great hall have survived. Farm buildings have been built against the outer side of the east wall of the great hall, making its inner side an outside face. The north wing, the roof of which has been lowered, has angle buttresses, a blocked pointed window with a hood mould in the west gable end, and inserted doors and pitch holes on the north and south sides. Inside, in the upper storey, are the remains of a fireplace. The block containing the former chapel has a timber-framed gable with pigeon holes, and an external staircase. The outer wall of the east wing (the inner wall of the former great hall) contains, from the north, a blocked doorway that gave access to the north wing, traces of two blocked windows, and a blocked doorway with a pointed head.

== Appraisal ==
The remains of Storeton Hall were designated a Grade II* listed building on 27 December 1962. Grade II* is the middle of the three grades of listing and is applied to "particularly important buildings of more than special interest". The description in the National Heritage List for England states that "although remaining only in part, the buildings are an interesting medieval survival".

== See also ==
- Grade II* listed buildings in Merseyside
- Listed buildings in Storeton
