= Woodside, Merseyside =

Area of Birkenhead, England

Coordinates: 53.394804°N 3.01230°W

Woodside
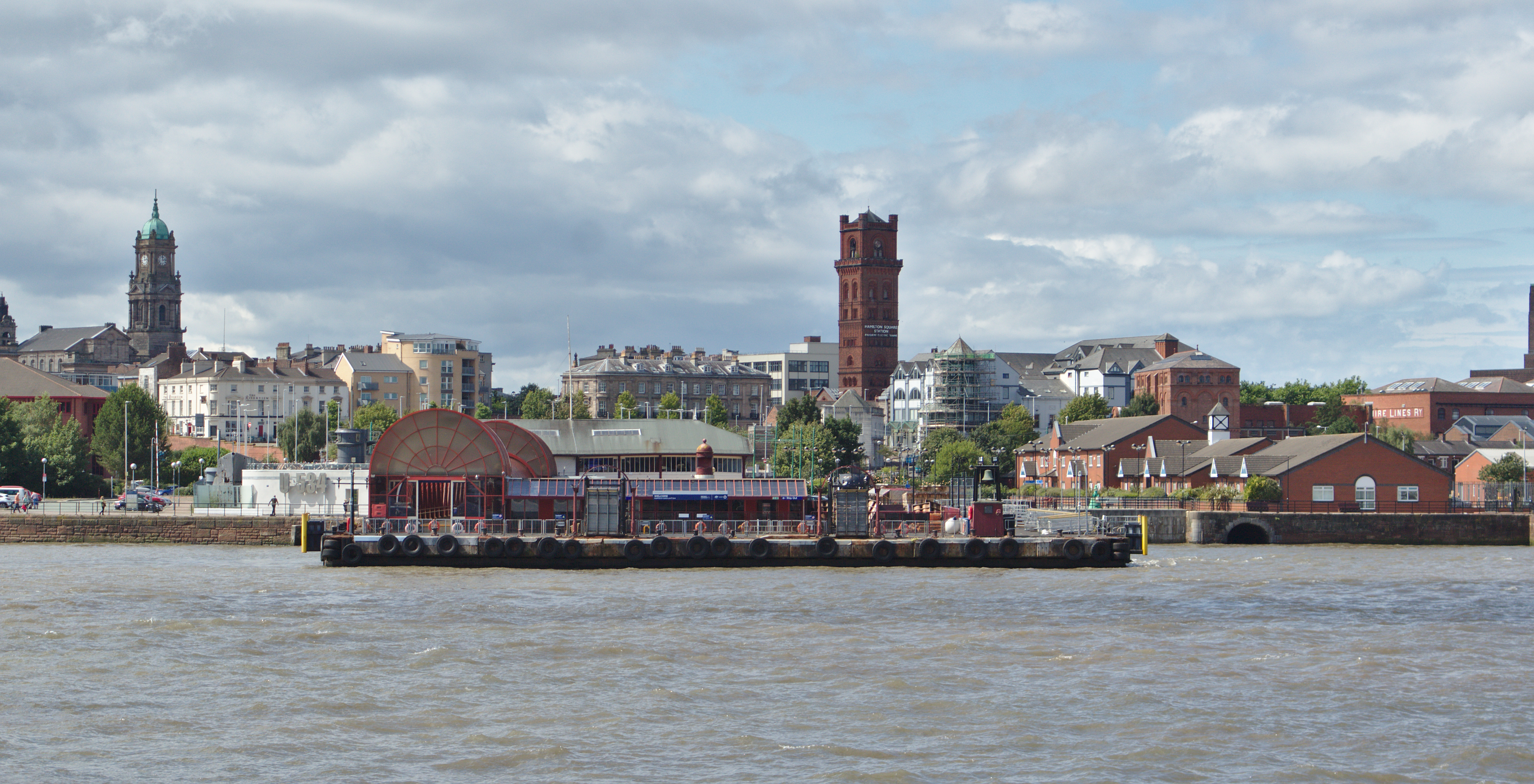
- Panorama of the area

- Location within Merseyside
- OS grid reference: SJ324890
  - London: 178 mi (286 km) SE
- Metropolitan borough: Wirral
- Metropolitan county: Merseyside
- Region: North West
- Country: England
- Sovereign state: United Kingdom
- Post town: BIRKENHEAD
- Postcode district: CH41
- Dialling code: 0151
- ISO 3166 code: GB-WRL
- Police: Merseyside
- Fire: Merseyside
- Ambulance: North West
- UK Parliament: Birkenhead

Royal Iris of the Mersey departing Woodside Ferry in 2006.

Woodside is an area of Birkenhead in the Metropolitan Borough of Wirral in Merseyside, England. It is situated opposite Liverpool Pier Head across the River Mersey.

== History ==
The monks of Birkenhead Priory had been granted a charter establishing ferry rights to Liverpool, which was confirmed by Edward III in about 1330. These rights reverted to the Crown in 1536, upon the Dissolution of the Monasteries by Henry VIII.

There followed a period of private ownership by local landowners of the numerous ferry services on the Wirral bank of the River Mersey, including at Woodside. By the 18th century, an increase in stage coach traffic from Chester spurred the growth of the transportation of passengers and goods across the river. With the rapid development of Birkenhead from the 1820s, facilities at Woodside would eventually need expanding. By 1842, the ferry service had been taken over by the Birkenhead Commissioners. A stone pier with two slipways and a small lighthouse at the pier head were constructed. There followed another period of major rebuilding, which included land reclamation up to the end of the pier. Construction of a floating landing stage in 1861 allowed for combined usage by the ferries and the Mersey Docks and Harbour Board. Improvements were made to the ferry's fleet at Woodside in 1890, with the replacement of paddle steamers for twin screw steamers.

A dedicated luggage boat service, which ferried goods and vehicles across the river, had begun by 1879. The opening of the Birkenhead to Liverpool Queensway road tunnel on 18 July 1934 hastened the demise of Woodside's luggage boats, the service ending on 21 July 1941.

On 30 August 1860, Britain's first street tramway was established, running from Woodside to Birkenhead Park. The idea of flamboyant American George Francis Train, the tramway was initially horse drawn. Electrified in 1901, tram services were discontinued in Birkenhead on 17 July 1937. A preserved Edwardian era tram is on display in the Woodside Ferry booking hall.

Originally built by the Great Western Railway in the 1870s, Birkenhead Woodside railway station was a mainline terminus, with services direct to London Paddington. The station closed on 5 November 1967 and was demolished within a couple of years.

=== Woodside Hotel ===
Built in about 1834 to replace an earlier establishment of the same name, the hotel was a busy coaching house and originally had stabling for 100 horses. Until the land reclamation works of the mid 19th century, the hotel was situated on the riverbank. The hotel was extended in 1963 with a new lounge 'Gough's Landing', named after a 19th-century licensee.

The historic building was extensively damaged in two fires on 4 June and 13 August 2008, having been unoccupied for some time. Deemed structurally unsafe, the remains of Woodside Hotel were demolished without planning permission in October 2008.

== Geography ==
Woodside is situated on the eastern side of the Wirral Peninsula, adjoining the River Mersey to the east. Woodside is about 5.5 km (3.4 mi) south-south-east of the Irish Sea at New Brighton and about 10.5 km (6.5 mi) east-north-east of the Dee Estuary at Thurstaston. The area is at an elevation of between 0–11 m (0–36 ft) above sea level.

== Landmarks ==
Woodside Ferry Terminal booking hall in 2006.

=== Mersey Ferries Booking Hall ===
A wooden construction on brick foundations, the 1864 booking hall is a listed building. It remained virtually unaltered until it was extensively refurbished from 1985 in the existing style, with many of the original timbers being replaced.

The formerly adjoining terminal building behind, of a similar construction, was demolished and replaced, due to poor condition. The passenger bridge and landing stage, which featured in the 1981 film Chariots of Fire, were also replaced at the same time.

From 2019 until 2023 the building contained a food court and bar, but the ferry terminal as a whole is currently closed for refurbishment and due to reopen in the summer of 2025.

=== Shore Road Pumping Station ===
Located opposite the site of the former Woodside Hotel, the Shore Road Pumping Station was a visitor attraction until 2008 when it closed to the public. Built in the 1870s, the 'Giant Grasshopper' engine is a working example of a large steam pump, which was used to clear water from the Mersey Railway Tunnel.

=== Memorial garden ===
A small garden area stands on the north side of the site, between the Bus terminal and the buildings off Shore Road. In the gardens is a stone plinth and a plaque commemorating Norman Tunna, Birkenhead resident and George Cross recipient.

=== Resurgam ===
A replica of the Birkenhead built, pioneering submarine Resurgam, was put on display in 1997 at Woodside. It is positioned near to the ferry terminal, on part of the site of the former floating roadway that once connected to the ferry landing stage.

=== U-534 ===
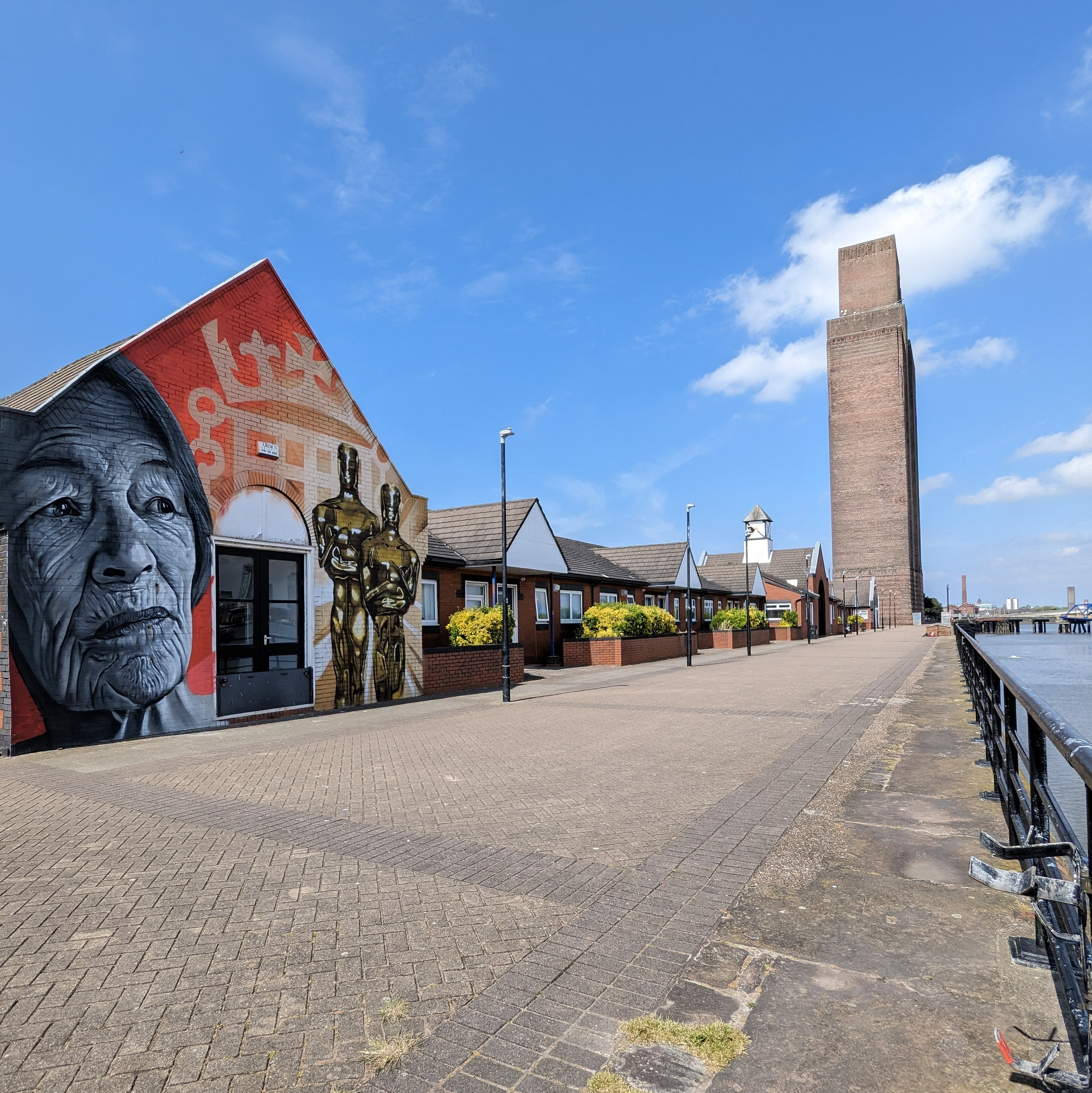
Waterfront at Woodside, Birkenhead showing Glenda Jackson mural

On 27 June 2007, the Merseytravel transit authority announced that it had acquired the German submarine U-534 to display at the Woodside Ferry Terminal. The submarine was sunk by British bombers in May 1945; it was salvaged in 1993 off the Danish island of Anholt.

The submarine was part of the collection of the Warship Preservation Trust at Birkenhead Docks, which closed on 5 February 2006. For technical reasons and to facilitate economical transportation to its new site, the vessel was cut into four sections. It will be displayed in this form to allow visitors better access and visibility. Beginning on 10 March 2008, the sections were transported by floating crane over a number of days. The exhibition opened on 10 February 2009 and closed in 2020. There are plans to build a new visitor attraction on the site.

=== Public art and memorials ===
The area is home to a number of murals by graffiti artist Brezaux, including tributes to Glenda Jackson and Paul O'Grady who were both born locally. There are also a sculpture depicting the Birkenhead drill and a plaque commemorating the HMS Thetis tragedy. At Monks Ferry, there is a plaque dedicated to Miguel Grau Seminario whose ship Huáscar was built at Cammell Laird.

== Transport ==
Woodside is one of two Wirral terminals for the Mersey Ferry to the Pier Head in Liverpool. This terminal underwent a programme of extensive refurbishment in 1985. When reopened on 13 March 1986, the restoration of the historic booking hall had been completed and the large, dilapidated Victorian landing stage replaced. In 2024, the landing stage and linkspan bridge was removed for another replacement.

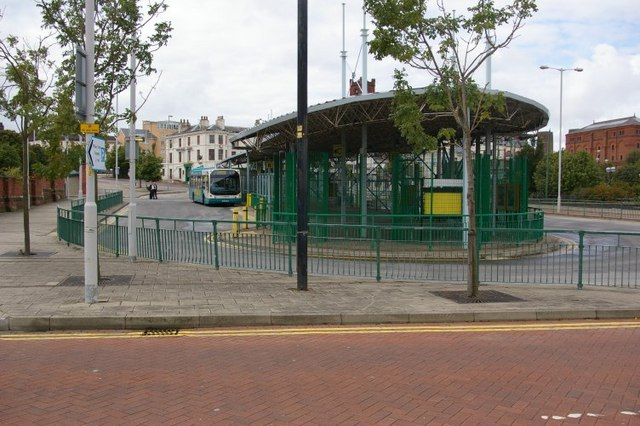
Woodside bus station

Woodside Bus Station is opposite the Woodside Ferry Terminal and was constructed as an interchange for passengers travelling to/from Liverpool via the Mersey Ferry. It opened in 1991.

The importance of Woodside as a major transport hub has declined. Woodside railway station closed in 1967, improvements to the Merseyrail network following the construction of the Liverpool Loop a decade later, the opening of the more centrally located Birkenhead bus station in the late 1990s and the diversion of several bus services to terminate in Liverpool instead, were all contributing factors. However, some local bus services still use the terminus and until 2023 tram services were occasionally run between the site and nearby Wirral Transport Museum.

The nearest railway station to Woodside is Hamilton Square station on Merseyrail's Wirral Line. Services run to Liverpool, Chester, Ellesmere Port, New Brighton and West Kirby.

== See also ==
- Listed buildings in Woodside, Merseyside
- Birkenhead Transport
