= Jindřich Bartoš =

Czechoslovak World War II flying ace

- Born: Jindřich Bartoš; 16 November 1911; Lugansk, Russia
- Died: 13 February 1941 (aged 29); Talacre, Prestatyn, United Kingdom
- Burial place: West Derby Cemetery, Liverpool
- Military career
- Allegiance: Czechoslovakia
- Branch: Royal Air Force
- Service years: 1940–1941
- Rank: Flying officer
- Nickname: Henry
- Unit: No. 312 Squadron RAF
- Conflicts: World War II; Battle of Britain

Flying Officer Jindřich "Henry" Bartoš (16 November 1911 – 13 February 1941) was a Czechoslovak fighter pilot who flew with the Royal Air Force during the Battle of Britain.

== Biography ==
Bartoš was born in 1911 in Lugansk, then part of the Russian Empire. He graduated as a pilot from the Czechoslovak Army Academy in 1935. He served in the Czech Air Force with the 2nd Air Regiment. When Germany invaded Czechoslovakia in 1938, Bartos escaped to Poland and then in the summer of 1939 on to France. On arrival in France, he joined the French Foreign Legion and then transferred to the Armee de l'Air where he fought for the Allies in the Battle of France.

Following the fall of France, Bartoš sailed via Casablanca to Gibraltar, where he transferred to another ship and eventually landed in Cardiff on 5 August 1940, with fellow Czech Otto Hanzlíček.

Bartoš joined the Royal Air Force and trained as a Hurricane pilot. He joined No. 312 Czechoslovak Fighter Squadron RAF on 5 September 1940 at RAF Duxford and became an operational pilot on 2 October 1940. He flew with 312 Sqn throughout the Battle of Britain, initially as a section leader, and following promotion to Flying Officer Bartos became the deputy flight leader of "B" flight.

Bartoš was killed in a flying accident on 13 February 1941 during a high-altitude training flight with fellow Czech Sergeant Bohumil Votruba. According to witnesses, the hurricane (tail number V6885) became caught in an uncontrollable spin, probably failure of oxygen device. It crashed at 14:30 at Talacre near Prestatyn.

Bartoš was buried on 18 February 1941 in a Commonwealth War Grave in West Derby Cemetery, Liverpool. Coincidentally he shares the grave plot with Otto Hanzlíček, whom he arrived in the UK with.
