= Storeton =

Village in Merseyside, England

Coordinates: 53.3564°N 3.0467°W

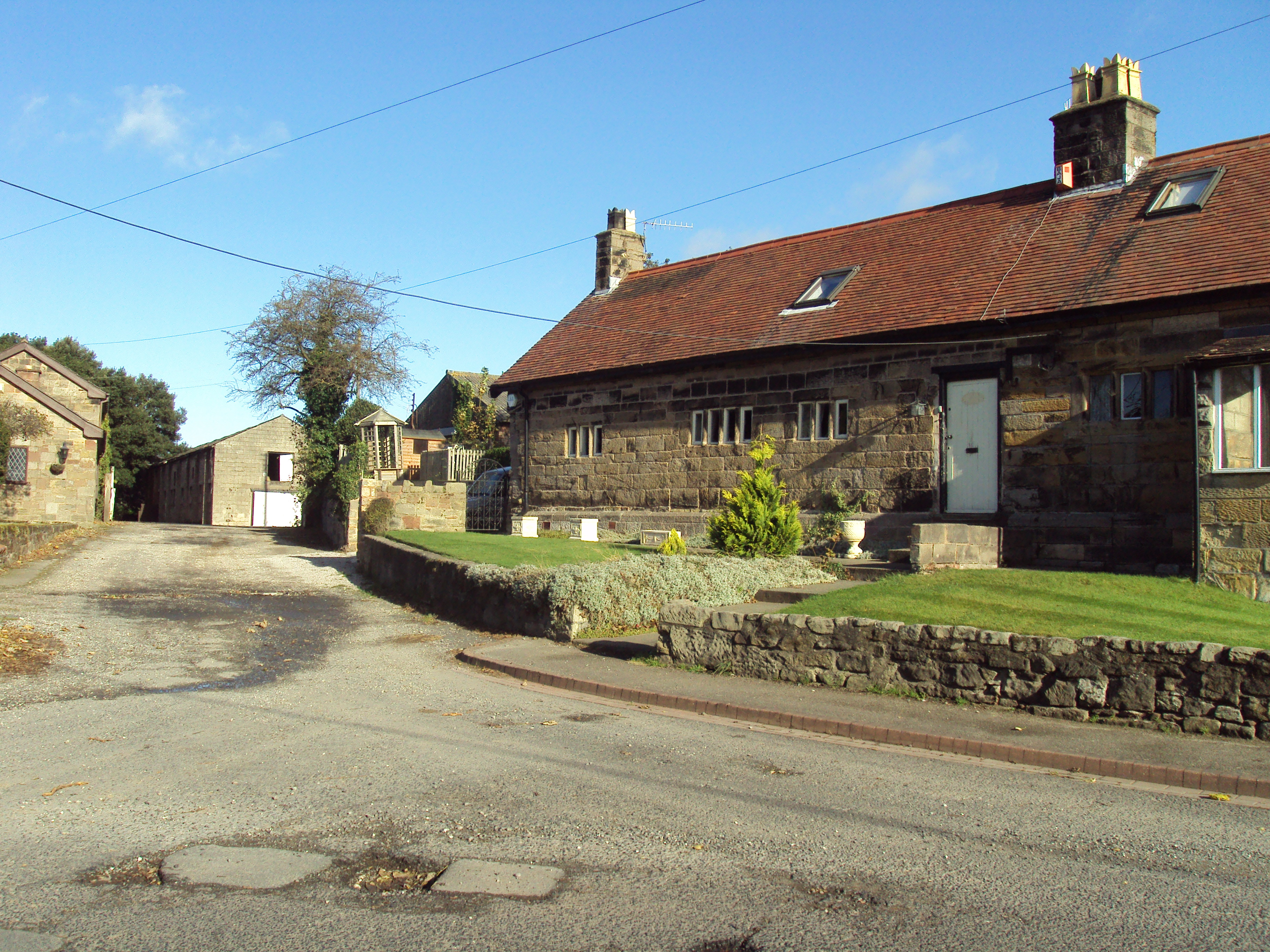
- Cottages on Red Hill Road, Storeton

- Location within Merseyside
- Population: 150 (2001 Census)
- OS grid reference: SJ304849
  - London: 177 mi (285 km) SE
- Metropolitan borough: Wirral
- Metropolitan county: Merseyside
- Region: North West
- Country: England
- Sovereign state: United Kingdom
- Post town: WIRRAL
- Postcode district: CH63
- Dialling code: 0151
- ISO 3166 code: GB-WRL
- Police: Merseyside
- Fire: Merseyside
- Ambulance: North West
- UK Parliament: Wirral West

Storeton is a small village and former civil parish in the Wirral district, in the county of Merseyside, England, on the Wirral Peninsula. It is west of the town of Bebington and is made up of Great Storeton and Little Storeton, which is classified as a hamlet. At the 2001 Census the population of Storeton was recorded as 150.

== History ==
Storeton has Viking connections, the name deriving from the Old Norse Stor-tún, meaning "great farmstead".

The village is mentioned in the Domesday Book of 1086 as Stortone.

It has been thought that the poem Sir Gawain and the Green Knight refers to Storeton Hall. Storeton Hall dates from the 14th century. It was formerly in Wirral Hundred.

Storeton was formerly a township in the parish of Bebington. It became a civil parish in its own right in 1866. In 1933 the parish was absorbed into the urban district of Bebington, which became the Municipal Borough of Bebington in 1937. Storeton remained a civil parish until 1974, but as an urban parish after 1933 it had no parish council, being directly administered by Bebington. The population of the parish was 180 in 1801, 233 in 1851, 265 in 1901 and 325 in 1951.

In October 1944 a USAAF Liberator Bomber number 42-50347 from the 445th Bombardment Group exploded without explanation over the fields between Little Storeton and Landican, with the loss of all 24 servicemen on board. The dead included 15 commissioned officers who were being taxied back to Tibenham after seeing more than 30 successful combat missions. In recent years a memorial stone has been erected by a local man who witnessed the aftermath of the crash as a teenager. The stone is coloured in the USAAF colours blue and yellow, with 24 yellow bricks each representing a life lost.

== Geography ==
Storeton is in the centre of the Wirral Peninsula, approximately 8.5 km (5.3 mi) south-south-east of the Irish Sea at Leasowe, about 6 km (3.7 mi) east-north-east of the Dee Estuary at Heswall and less than 4 km (2.5 mi) west-south-west of the River Mersey at New Ferry. The village is west of Storeton Hill, at around 52 m (171 ft) above sea level.

== Storeton Woods ==
On the ridge above the village Storeton Woods, owned by the Friends of Storeton Woods and covering 31 acres (130,000 m^{2}). The woods were purchased in 1989 after a campaign by the local Green Party as there were concerns about the deteriorating condition of the woods and the possibility that the land might be bought by developers. The trust later also attempted to purchase the adjacent Hancock's Wood to extend the nature reserve by a further 25 acres (100,000 m^{2}), but the deal with the Leverhulme estate fell through at the last minute. Although the offer remains open there is the concern that this could lead to the eventual development of the area of woodland for housing.

Storeton Woods is also the location for Storeton Transmitting Station, a television relay and radio transmitter and mast.

== Storeton quarries and tramway ==
The woods have grown up on the site of a quarry present since the times of the Roman occupation. The quarries were up to 200 feet (61 m) deep at the beginning of the 20th century and, from the 19th century, a tramway (a single-track, standard-gauge railway) was used to transport stone to the quayside at Bromborough. A portion of the tramway embankment still exists as footpath and a section of the rails have been re-installed by the Bromborough Society. Some rails were embedded at a former level crossing on Rest Hill Road until 1979 when they were buried under a new layer of tarmac. The tramway ran along the southern border of the current woods, into Hancock's Wood and through a tunnel under Mount Road. It then ran in a sweeping curve to Bromborough. Much of the route of the tramway can no longer be seen as it has been lost under housing development or levelled for the playing fields of Wirral Grammar School but the present Quarry Road and Quarry Road East in Bebington follow the track of Storeton Tramway and the original tunnel under the Chester to Birkenhead railway line is still in use as footpath opposite the end of Quarry Road East.

Most of the village is built from locally quarried stone from Storeton Ridge. The stone is a creamy sandstone and, according to the British Geological Survey, was also used for Roman tombstones and on Birkenhead Town Hall (in Hamilton Square), Lime Street station, Lever House in Port Sunlight, and Sankey Viaduct in Cheshire. The quarry was also the site of the discovery of prehistoric footprints. The track-makers were likely pseudosuchian archosaurs, often incorrectly referred to as dinosaurs, but they were not closely related. The species was named Chirotherium storetonense after the site of discovery. Examples of these footprints can be seen in World Museum Liverpool in Liverpool and the Williamson Art Gallery in Birkenhead, and also in Christ Church, Kings Road, Higher Bebington.

The quarry was filled in with spoil from the excavation of the Queensway Tunnel in the 1920s and the site is currently a tranquil nature reserve enjoyed by walkers.

== Transport ==
=== Bus ===
Services operating in the Storeton area, as of 8 December 2014:

Number	Route	Operator	Days of Operation
77/77A	Heswall-Woodside	Avon Buses	Monday-Saturday

=== Railway ===
The Borderlands Line passes between Storeton and Barnston, to the west. Storeton railway station opened in 1896. However, due to its isolation, the station was closed to passengers in 1951, closed completely in 1964 and later demolished.

== See also ==
- Listed buildings in Storeton

== Bibliography ==
- Jermy, Roger C. (1981). Storeton Tramway. Avon-Anglia Publications. ISBN 9780905466439.
- Mortimer, William Williams (1847). The History of the Hundred of Wirral. London: Whittaker & Co. pp192-194.
