= St John the Evangelist, Knotty Ash =

St John the Evangelist's Church, Knotty Ash
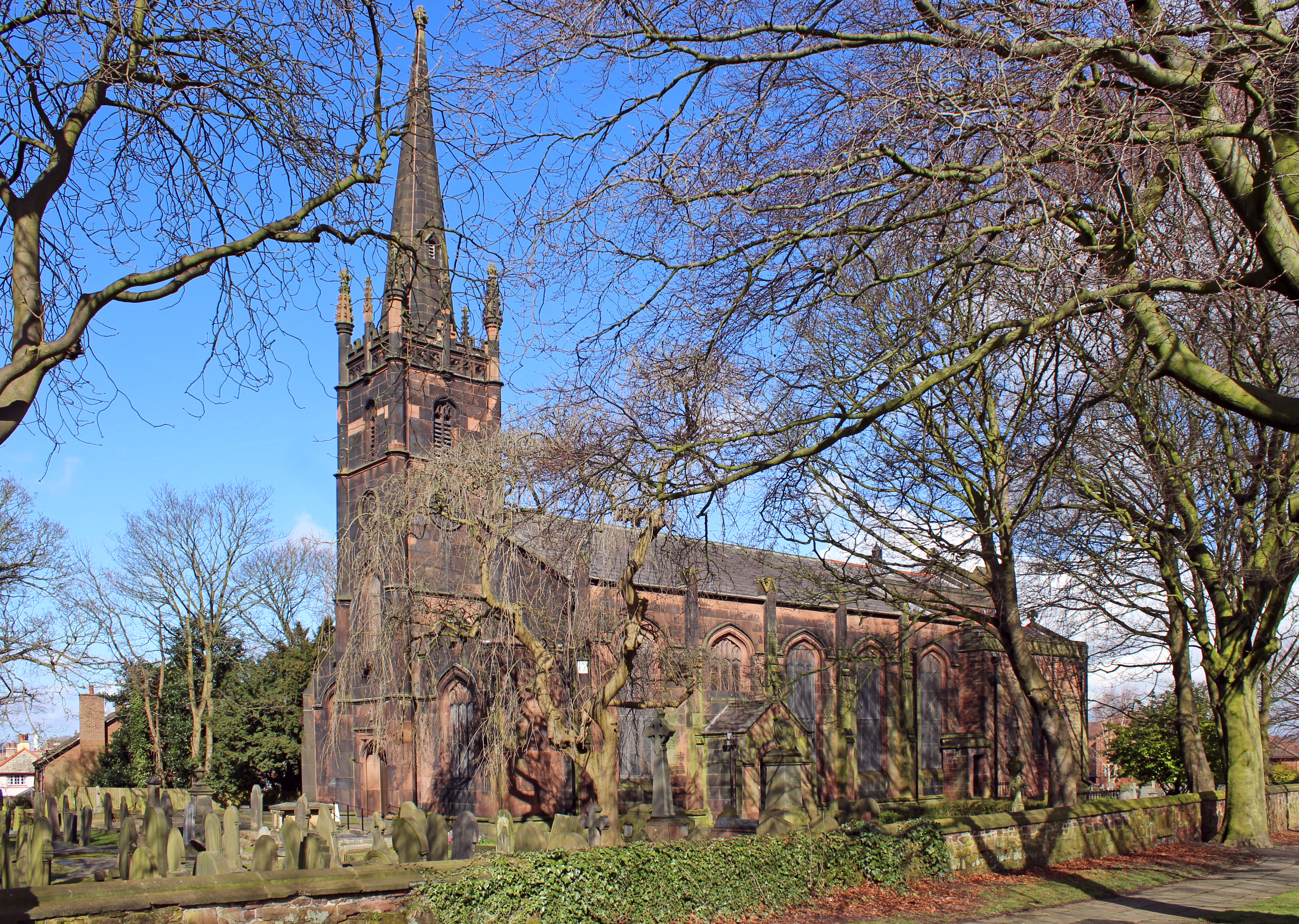
- St John the Evangelist's Church, Knotty Ash
- St John the Evangelist's Church, Knotty Ash
- 53.41625°N 2.891717°W
- OS grid reference: SJ 40861 91406
- Location: Knotty Ash, Liverpool, Merseyside
- Country: England
- Denomination: Anglican

History
- Status: Parish church
- Dedication: St John the Evangelist

Architecture
- Functional status: Active
- Heritage designation: Grade II
- Architect(s): Williams and Edwards
- Architectural type: Church
- Style: Gothic
- Groundbreaking: 1834
- Completed: 1836

Administration
- Province: York
- Diocese: Liverpool
- Archdeaconry: Liverpool
- Deanery: West Derby
- Parish: Knotty Ash

St John the Evangelist, Knotty Ash, is a church in the Knotty Ash area of Liverpool, Merseyside, England. It is on Thomas Lane and was built 1834–6.

The architects were Williams and Edwards and it was built by Richard and Paul Barker of Huyton in red ashlar sandstone. There is a narrow west tower with recessed spire and thin polygonal buttresses. It has tall church sides with three light perpendicular windows and thin buttresses. The taller chancel with south chapel is an 1890 addition by Aldridge and Deacon. There is an excellent late 19th century Celtic cross in the churchyard, finely carved. The churchyard contains war graves of three soldiers, a Royal Navy sailor and a Royal Air Force officer of World War I and three soldiers and an airman of World War II.

More detail about the history of St John's and its graveyard with war memorial graves in plots 10:C9 and 10:C10 and the grave of Norman Harrison, Second Engineer of the S.S. Titanic plot 5:C6, can also be found on the churches website..

== Images ==
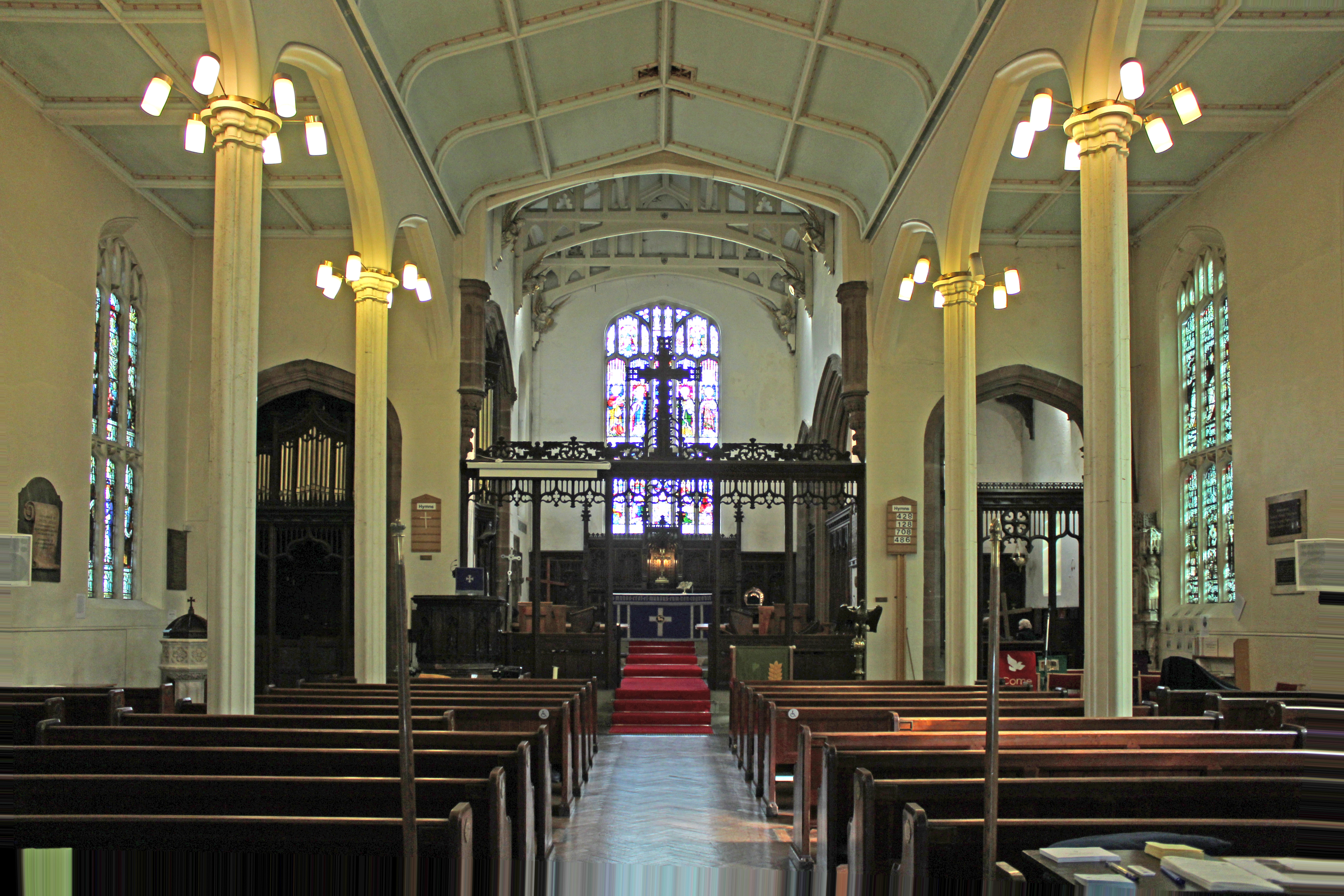
Nave towards the chancel

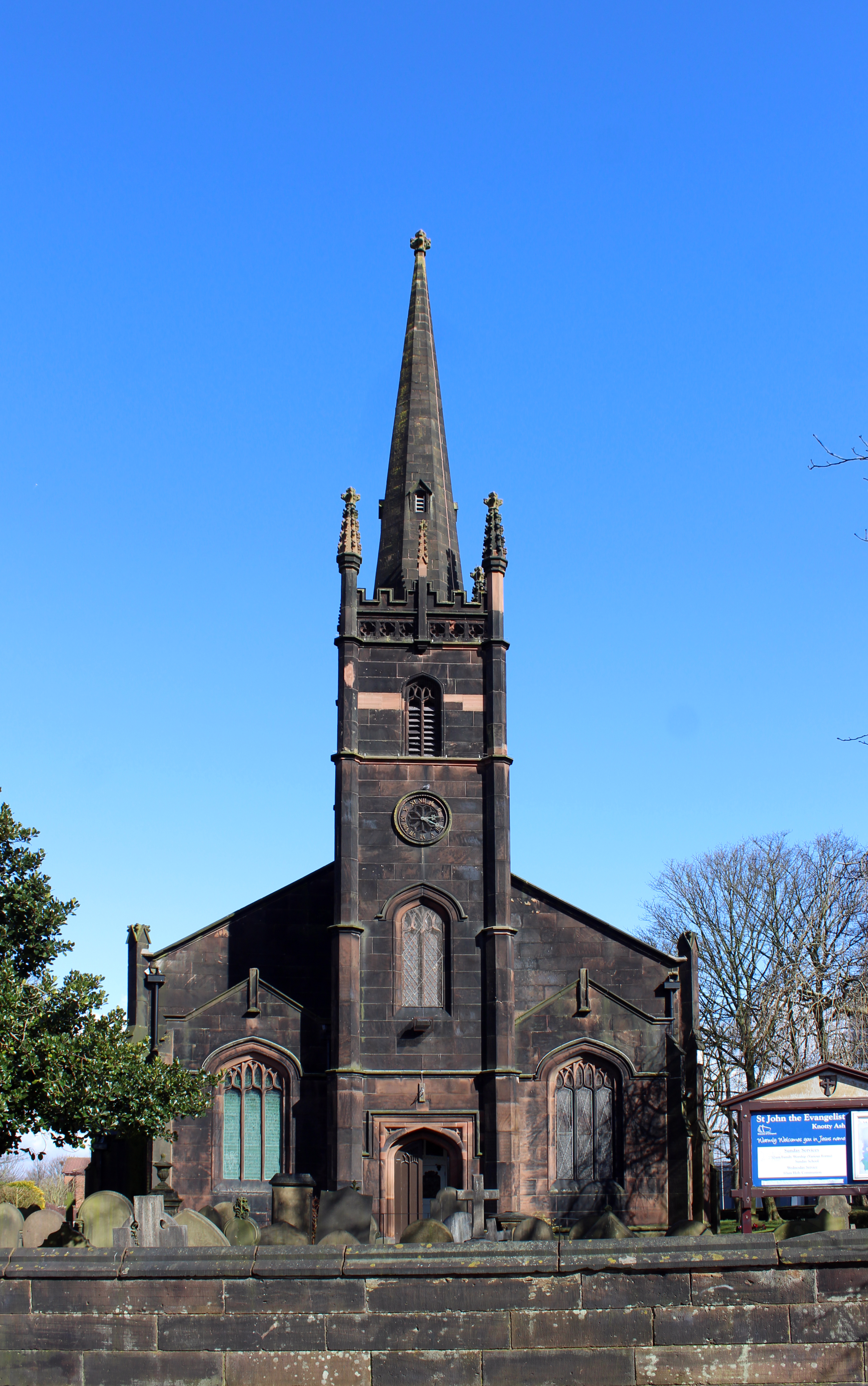
West end and tower

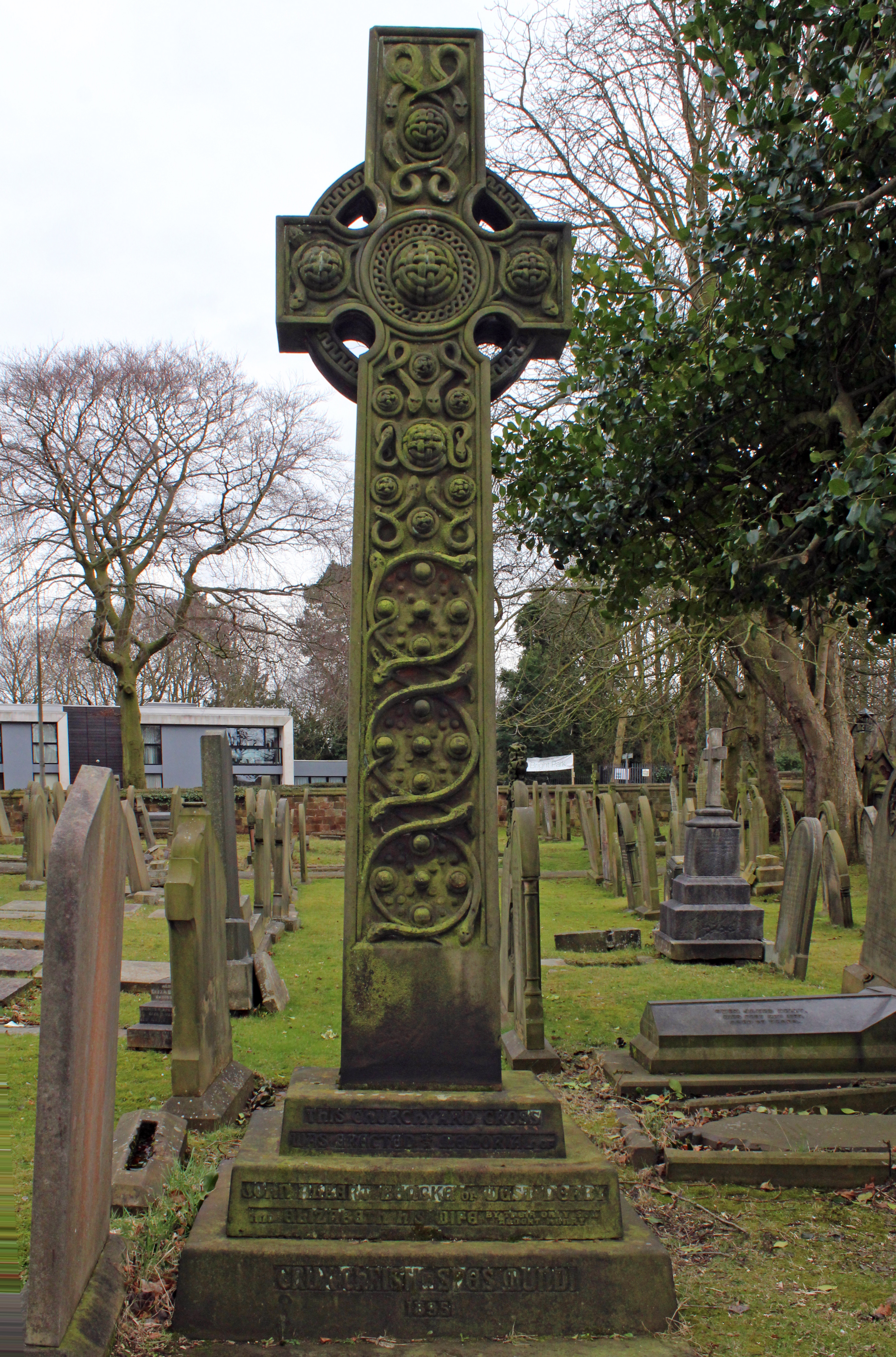
The Celtic cross. This is a Cenotaph for a local businessman and his wife, John & Elizabeth Bencke.

== See also ==
- Grade II listed buildings in Liverpool-L14
