= New Hall, Fazakerley =

Road in Liverpool

Coordinates: 53.4717°N 2.9238°W

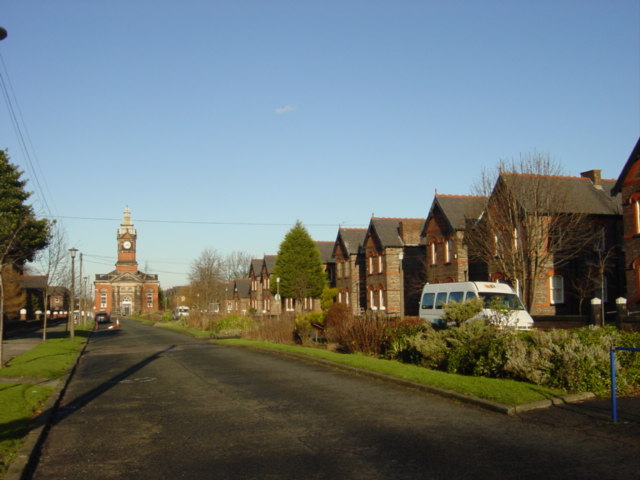
New Hall showing houses and the hall

New Hall, also known as Clock Tower Park, is located to the north of Longmoor Lane, Fazakerley, Liverpool, England. Originally built as cottage homes, all the buildings in New Hall are recorded in the National Heritage List for England as designated Grade II listed buildings.

== History ==
The complex was built between 1887 and 1889. It was designed by Charles H. Lancaster for the West Derby Poor Law Union, chaired by John Houlding, as a facility to provide accommodation for children from the West Derby Workhouse. There was originally a farm, but this is no longer present. It continued as a children's home until 1964 and at the end of the 21st century, the site was restored from a state of dereliction and converted into office space, a marine training academy and school.

== Layout and architecture ==
New Hall consists of a broad avenue lined with a row of two-storey brick houses (originally called "cottages"). At the entrance to the avenue is the former superintendent's house and a probationary ward. In the centre of the avenue towards the end is a square containing a hall, and surrounded by other buildings, including a swimming bath and service buildings. The houses are identical, each having a gabled five-bay front, and an H-shaped plan. The hall is a large building in red brick with sandstone dressings, and has tall round-headed windows along the sides, and a balustraded parapet. The front facing Longmoor Lane has a portico with a pediment carried on Corinthian pilasters, above which is a clock tower.

== See also ==
- Grade II listed buildings in Liverpool-L10
