= Listed buildings in Rainford =

Rainford is a civil parish in St Helens, Merseyside, England. It contains 27 buildings that are recorded in the National Heritage List for England as designated listed buildings. Of these, one is listed at Grade II*, the middle of the three grades, and the others are at Grade II, the lowest grade. Apart from the village of Rainford, the parish is rural. The listed buildings are mainly houses, farmhouses, farm buildings and associated structures. Other listed buildings include a public house, a church, village stocks, a former mill, and a pair of statues.

== Key ==
Grade	Criteria
II*	Particularly important buildings of more than special interest
II	Buildings of national importance and special interest

== Buildings ==
Name and location	Photograph	Date	Notes	Grade
Guildhall Farmhouse; 53.49628°N 2.73800°W	—	1629	A brick house that was extended in 1688. It is built in brick with dressings and extensions in stone and a stone-slate roof. The house is in two storeys with an attic, and has a four-bay front. The second bay is a projecting two-storey porch, and the fourth bay is a cross-wing; both have gables with ball finials. There are also two rear wings. The windows are mullioned, some containing casements. At the rear is a portion of timber-framed wall with brick infill. Inside the house is an inglenook.	II*
Barn, Guildhall Farm; 53.49600°N 2.73762°W	—	17th century	This originated as a barn with a cow house and a stable. The building is in stone, and has a roof partly of slate and partly of stone-slate. It is in a single storey with a five-bay front, and has a two-storey cross-wing at the west end. It has been converted into residential use.	II
Billinge Hall; 53.50842°N 2.73637°W	—	17th century	A stone farmhouse with a roof partly of slate and partly of concrete tiles. It has an H-shaped plan with cross-wings, is in two storeys, and has a four-bay front. The outer bays project forward and are gabled. Most of the windows are mullioned. The entrance has an architrave with a canopy above.	II
Maddock's Farmhouse; 53.51383°N 2.74737°W	—	Late 17th century	The farmhouse is in stone with a roof partly of stone-slate and partly of slate. It is in two storeys, and has a five-bay front. The windows are mullioned, some containing casements. In the second bay is a gabled entrance, and a garage entrance has been inserted into the fourth bay.	II
Maggot's Nook Farmhouse; 53.51862°N 2.77713°W	—	Late 17th century	The farmhouse is in stone with a slate roof, it is in two storeys and has a two-bay front, the first bay being gabled. The windows are mullioned with four or five lights. There is a small gabled porch on the front.	II
Scythe Stone Delph Farmhouse; 53.51377°N 2.78018°W	—	1682	The farmhouse is in stone with a slate roof, it is in two storeys, and has a three-bay front. In the centre is a two-storey gabled porch containing a segmental-headed doorway with an inscribed lintel. The windows are mullioned.	II
Barn, Crow's Nest; 53.50681°N 2.73563°W	—	1700	The barn is in stone with a slate roof. It has a front of five bays, a gabled wing to south east with an outshut under a cat-slide roof to its left, and a cow house under cat-slide roof to the north west. The barn contains a datestone, a garage entrance, pitch holes, a blocked entrance, and ventilation slits.	II
Derbyshire House; 53.50704°N 2.73781°W		1702	A stone house with a stone-slate roof, it is in two storeys and has a symmetrical four-bay front. The windows are mullioned and transomed. The central entrance has a bolection-moulded architrave, flat pilasters, an entablature, and a pediment. A two-bay single-storey extension was added on the left side in the 1990s.	II
Fir Tree House; 53.50598°N 2.74661°W	—	1704	A stone farmhouse with a slate roof. It has a double pile plan, is in two storeys and has a four-bay front. The windows are sashes, and the rear windows are mullioned. Some of the internal walls are timber-framed with laths for wattle and daub infill.	II
Dial House; 53.49706°N 2.77354°W	—	1722	A brick house with stone dressings and a stone-slate roof. It is in two storeys, and has a front of three bays. Projecting from the first bay is a two-storey gabled porch containing a doorway with panelled pilasters, an entablature, and a fanlight. Above this is a datestone and a sundial. The windows in the first and second bays are sashes, those in the ground floor with wedge lintels, and in the third bay they are casements.	II
Stable, Heysome House; 53.49073°N 2.75340°W	—	1732	The stable is built with a ground floor in stone, an upper floor in brick, and a stone-slate roof. It is in two storeys, and has a three-bay front. On the ground floor are three stable doors and windows with stone lintels, and above are three pitch holes. On the gables are ball finials, and there is a stone inscribed with initials and the date.	II
Barn, Dial House; 53.49717°N 2.77333°W	—	18th century (probable)	The barn is built in brick and has a four-bay front with two storeys. It contains casement windows, a barn entrance, and a later garage entrance.	II
Barn, Heysome House; 53.49075°N 2.75290°W	—	18th century (probable)	The barn is built in brick with a stone plinth and has a stone-slate roof with a finial. It has a five-bay front with a central entrance. In the first bay is a pitch hole, and the fifth bay has a stable door. On the gables are ball finials.	II
Gazebo; 53.50563°N 2.74570°W	—	18th century (probable)	The gazebo is built in stone with a hipped stone-slate roof. The entrance has a semicircular lintel flanked by small windows, one a sash, the other a casement. At the rear is a basement entrance.	II
Village stocks 53.49879°N 2.78521°W	—	18th century	The stocks consists of two stone posts. They have rounded tops and grooves for wooden boards. The left post has a benchmark.	II
Barn, Shaley Brow Farm; 53.50963°N 2.73118°W	—	Mid to late 18th century	The barn is in sandstone with a stone-slate roof, and was built to provide accommodation for animals and storage for foodstuffs. It has a four-bay front, and contains various doorways. On the south side is a massive buttress.	II
Golden Lion public house 53.50077°N 2.78809°W		1769	A roughcast public house with stone dressings and a stone-slate roof. It has a front of six bays. From the left is a single-storey wing in one bay, next and slightly forward is a two-bay block in two storeys, and the main block, projecting even further forward, is in three bays with three storeys. The windows in the top storey of this block are casements, and the others are sashes with rusticated wedge lintels and moulded sills. The doorway is round-headed surrounded by a Doric doorcase with pilasters and a broken pediment.	II
Former mill 53.50708°N 2.73623°W	—	Late 18th or 19th century	The former mill building is in stone with a slate roof. It is in a single storey with a cellar and has a three-bay front. The building contains 20th-century casement windows, and there is a small iron water wheel on the left side. Inside is a stone fireplace and fragments of machinery.	II
Heysome House; 53.49038°N 2.75312°W	—	Early 19th century	A brick house with stone dressings and a stone-slate roof. It is in two storeys with a front of three bays and a single-storey extension to the left. The windows have wedge lintels, some are sashes and others are casements. There is a central round-headed doorway with a Doric doorcase containing a fanlight.	II
Mossborough Hall; 53.48449°N 2.80774°W		19th century	A stone house with a stone-slate roof on the site of the previous manor house. It has an irregular plan, is in two storeys, and has a front of five bays. This front contains three gables, the one in the first bay containing a stone from the older house inscribed with 1703 and initials. The left side is in three bays, the first bay projecting and gabled with a coat of arms in a panel. There is a central gabled porch containing a Tudor arched entrance and surmounted with a finial. The windows are mullioned. The moated site on which the hall stands is a scheduled monument.	II
Pair of statues 53.49576°N 2.78167°W	—	19th century (or earlier)	The statues stand in front of Nos. 133 and 135 Church Road. They are made either in cast artificial stone or in terracotta, and depict figures dressed in Roman costume. They stand on square plinths on brick bases, and each statue has an iron ring in the small of the back.	II
Cow houses, Mossborough Hall; 53.48492°N 2.80827°W	—	1852	Part of a model farm, the cow houses are built in stone with slate roofs. There is a central range with four parallel ranges extending on each side. The gables contain roundels. The central range has an M-shaped roof, and the west front contains round-headed entrances.	II
Farm building, Mossborough Hall; 53.48511°N 2.80871°W	—	1852	The farm building is part of a model farm and built in stone with slate roofs. It consists of a two-storey range in eight bays with a three-storey barn and animal feed mill behind, together with a former engine shed and cart shed.	II
Smithy, Mossborough Hall; 53.48502°N 2.80921°W	—	1852	The smithy and wheelwright's shop is part of a model farm and built in stone with a slate roof. It contains a segmental opening at the front and a smaller opening at the rear.	II
Duck houses, White House Farm; 53.50193°N 2.77767°W	—	1860s	There are three duck houses built in stone with slate roofs. Each duck house has a rectangular plan and has a shallow gable, a round-arched entrance, and a large keystone flanked by windows, now blocked.	II
Farm building, White House Farm; 53.50154°N 2.77773°W	—	1860s	The farm building is in stone with slate roofs. It has a U-shaped plan, and is mainly in two storeys. It contains gables and various openings including windows, pitch holes, stable doors, ventilation slits and a cart entrance.	II
All Saints' Church; 53.50008°N 2.78726°W		1878	The church replaced an earlier chapel nearby, and was designed by Aldridge and Deacon. It is built in sandstone and has a slate roof. The tower was added in 1903, followed by a chapel in 1928. The church consists of a nave with a clerestory, aisles, a chancel with a south chapel, and a northeast tower. The tower has an octagonal bell stage, pinnacles, an embattled parapet and a pyramidal roof.	II
