= Listed buildings in Cronton =

Cronton is a civil parish in Knowsley, Merseyside, England. It contains eight buildings recorded in the National Heritage List for England as designated listed buildings, all listed at Grade II. This grade is the lowest of the three steps given to listed buildings and is applied to "buildings of national importance and special interest". The parish includes the village of Cronton and is otherwise rural. Apart from a medieval cross base and a set of stocks, the listed buildings are all houses and associated structures.

Name and location	Photograph	Date	Notes
Cross; 53.39240°N 2.76375°W		Medieval	The cross base is in stone and consists of three square steps, a base in the form of a cube, and the stump of a shaft.
Sunnyside Farmhouse; 53.39260°N 2.76160°W		16th or early 17th century	Basically a timber-framed house, it was encased in brick and an upper floor was added in the 18th century. The house consists of a main range and a gabled cross-wing, with a sandstone base to one end, it is in two storeys, and has a stone slab roof. The windows are horizontally-sliding sashes. It has a baffle entry plan, and inside is a pair of crucks.
Wayside; 53.39111°N 2.75089°W	—	17th century	A sandstone house with some repairs in brick, and a slate roof. It is in two storeys, and has an irregular L-shaped plan. The original range is in three bays. A cross-gabled wing was added in the 18th century, and there were further alterations in the 19th and 20th centuries. The interior contains features from each phase of the building.
Town End Farmhouse; 53.39288°N 2.76439°W	—	1705	A sandstone house with a stone roof, it has an H-shaped plan with gabled wings, and is in two storeys. In the right gable is a datestone.
The Field; 53.39170°N 2.75819°W	—	1740	A brick cottage with a slate roof, in two storeys, and with a three-bay front. The windows are horizontally-sliding sashes, and the datestone is above the doorway.
Holly Farmhouse; 53.38355°N 2.75897°W	—	18th century	A brick house with stone dressings, including quoins and a cornice, and a slate roof. It is in two storeys, and has a symmetrical three-bay front. The windows are sashes, and there is a central modern moulded doorcase.
Gates and gate piers Cronton Hall; 53.40589°N 2.78513°W	—	Undated	A pair of square stone gate piers. They are panelled, have Doric columns on the front, a frieze with metopes and triglyphs, and a cornice. On the top are urns with masks and drapery. The gates are in wrought iron.
Stocks; 53.38885°N 2.76284°W		Undated	The stocks consist of two stone uprights. They contain wooden boards with two pairs of holes for legs.
