= Norris Green Park =

Public park in Liverpool, England

Coordinates: 53°26′17″N 2°55′08″W

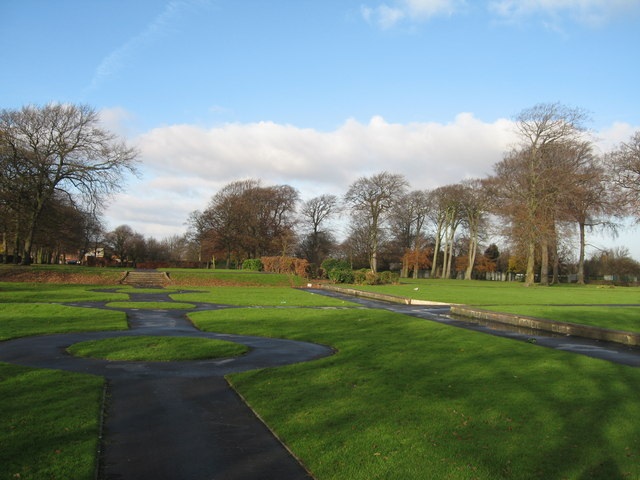
- Interactive map of Norris Green Park
- Type: Public Park
- Location: Norris Green, Liverpool
- Area: 17 acres (0.069 km^{2})
- Website: liverpool.gov.uk/parks-and-greenspaces/local-parks-and-greenspaces/norris-green-park/

Norris Green Park in Norris Green, Liverpool, England is a city park situated between Broad Lane and Lorenzo Drive.

The park contains the ruin of Norris Green, the original name of the grand mansion built by the Norris family in the fields and pastureland near West Derby. The park was created from the gardens and grounds of the mansion. Norris Green gave its name to the vast, council estate built to ease the housing crisis of the 1920s on land given to the city by Lord Derby of Knowsley Hall. He donated the land on the provision that no public houses were to be built within the estate.

The park was transferred to council ownership in 1933 to be used as a public space.

In 2018 a group of volunteers formed Friends of Norris Green Park to improve the park for the benefit of local people and residents of the city.

== Norris Green mansion ==
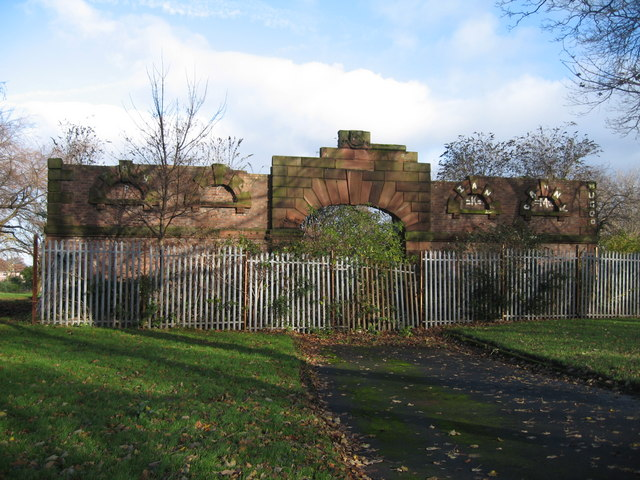
Remains of Norris Green mansion

The ruins of Norris Green are all that remains of the mansion built in 1830 to replace the original mansion built in the 17th century by the Norris family. The building itself was demolished in 1931 leaving just one wall of sandstone blocks as the only remaining example of the classical architecture. Above the arch is a crest with the Latin inscription ALTE VOLO ("I fly high").

The standing remains, described as a stable block, are of Grade II listed building status.
