= Listed buildings in Storeton =

Storeton is a village in Wirral, Merseyside, England. It contains two buildings that are recorded in the National Heritage List for England as designated listed buildings. Of these, one is listed at Grade II*, the middle of the three grades, and the other is at Grade II, the lowest grade. The former was a medieval that has been converted into farm buildings, and the other is a pair of stone houses.

== Key ==
Grade	Criteria
II*	Particularly important buildings of more than special interest
II	Buildings of national importance and special interest

== Buildings ==
Name and location	Photograph	Date	Notes	Grade
Storeton Hall; 53.35211°N 3.04532°W		1372	A medieval H-plan house, part of which has been converted into farm buildings, possibly in the 17th century. The building consists of two ranges at right angles to each other, with the former chapel forming a block in the corner. The buildings are in stone, and some gables are timber-framed. They contain openings, some of which are original, some are blocked, and some have been inserted. There are also doorways and the remains of a fireplace.	II*
Bethlem and adjoining house 53.35119°N 3.04509°W		17th century (probable)	A pair of stone houses with a tiled roof. They are in a single storey and have a six-bay front. The windows are mullioned, and there are two entrances, one of which is approached by steps leading up to a lean-to porch.	II

== See also ==
- Grade I listed buildings in Merseyside
- Grade II* listed buildings in Merseyside
