= Listed buildings in Upton, Merseyside =

Upton is a village in Wirral, Merseyside, England. It contains five buildings that are recorded in the National Heritage List for England as designated listed buildings, all of which are listed at Grade II. This grade is the lowest of the three gradings given to listed buildings and is applied to "buildings of national importance and special interest". Originally a village, Upton has become absorbed by the growth of Birkenhead, of which it is now effectively a suburb. The listed buildings are two churches, a library and two large houses, both of which have been adapted to serve other purposes.

Name and location	Photograph	Date	Notes
Upton Hall; 53.38585°N 3.10006°W		c.1840	Originally a house, later part of a school, it is in stuccoed brick. The building has two storeys and a three-bay front. In the centre is a portico porch with two pairs of Tuscan columns. The windows are sashes, the window above the doorway having a moulded architrave with an entablature. At the top of the building is a parapet.
Manor House; 53.39291°N 3.10483°W		c. 1853	This was built as a house for William Inman, it was extended with the addition of another block before 1875, and has more recently been used as a nursing home. The house is in stone with a Welsh slate roof. It has two storeys, and the later block also has attics. The entrance front has three bays, a central doorway with paired Doric columns, and a two storey bay window. The windows are sashes. There are more bay windows elsewhere, with dormers in the newer block, and a belvedere tower with a pyramidal roof in the angle between the blocks.
St Mary's Church; 53.38486°N 3.09620°W		1868	Designed by John Cunningham in early Decorated style, the church is built in stone with Welsh slate roofs. It consists of a nave without aisles, a polygonal apse, a south organ loft, and a southwest tower. On the north wall of the church, forming three gables, is a complex of vestries and halls. The tower is in two stages, with angle buttresses, a corbel table with beasts' heads, corner pinnacles, and an embattled parapet.
Upton Library; 53.38452°N 3.08951°W		1936	The library, designed by Richard Furniss, is in red and brown brick on a sandstone plinth, it has concrete parapets, and is in a single storey. At the entrance is a double-height oval rotunda flanked by lower segmental projections. In the centre is the metal doorway with a moulded sandstone architrave, and a tall metal fanlight. The body of the library has an open book plan with projections to the rear, and a flat roof. Most of the original furnishings have been retained.
St Joseph's Church; 53.38598°N 3.09870°W		1953–54	A church by Adrian Gilbert Scott in Perpendicular style. It is in brick with stone dressings and has a tiled roof. The church consists of a nave with projections towards the east end, a sanctuary, around which are three sacristies, and a west tower. The tower has three stages with clasping buttresses and a crenellated parapet.
