= Grade II listed buildings in Liverpool-L10 =

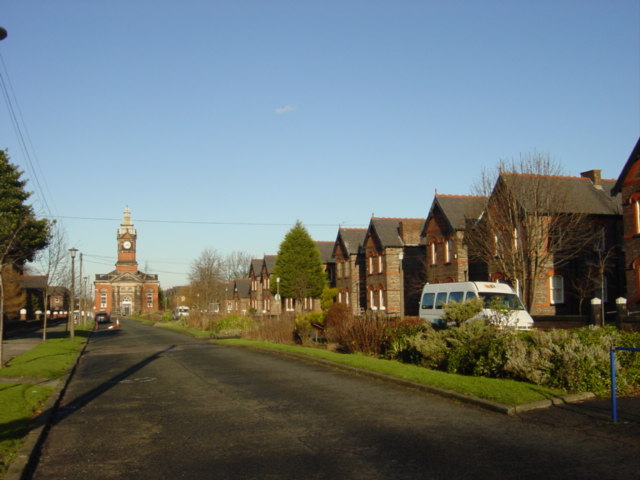
New Hall showing cottages and the dining hall

Liverpool is a city and port in Merseyside, England, which contains many listed buildings. A listed building is a structure designated by English Heritage of being of architectural and/or of historical importance and, as such, is included in the National Heritage List for England. There are three grades of listing, according to the degree of importance of the structure. Grade I includes those buildings that are of "exceptional interest, sometimes considered to be internationally important"; the buildings in Grade II* are "particularly important buildings of more than special interest"; and those in Grade II are "nationally important and of special interest". Very few buildings are included in Grade I — only 2.5% of the total. Grade II* buildings represent 5.5% of the total, while the great majority, 92%, are included in Grade II.

Liverpool contains more than 1,550 listed buildings, of which 28 are in Grade I, 109 in Grade II*, and the rest in Grade II. (Note: These figures are taken from a search in the National Heritage List for England in May 2013, and are subject to variation as further buildings are listed, grades are revised, or buildings are delisted.) This list contains the Grade II listed buildings in the L10 postal district of Liverpool. These total 25, and all of them are located in the former model village known as New Hall. This was built between 1887–89 to designs by Charles H. Lancaster to provide accommodation for children from the West Derby Workhouse. It consists of a row of identical houses, a central hall, and ancillary buildings. During the 21st century the complex is being converted by Urban Splash to provide housing and office accommodation.

Grade II listed buildings from other areas in the city can be found through the box on the right, along with the lists of the Grade I and Grade II* buildings in the city.

== Buildings ==
Name	Location	Notes
Dining hall	Longmoor Lane; 53.4721°N 2.9239°W	Standing in the middle of the central avenue, this is a large building in red brick with stone dressings and a slate roof. Along the sides are ten bays, each containing a round-headed window. Along the top is a balustraded parapet. The south front is in three bays with a central Corinthian portico with pilasters and a pediment. Above this is a clock tower with an elaborate three stage spire.
Kitchen yard buildings	Longmoor Lane; 53.4716°N 2.9243°W	Ancillary buildings in common brick, with dressings of red brick and stone, and a slate roof with a tiled crest. They are in one storey, with a six-bay front. The windows are casements. The right side of the building extends back for eleven bays, including two gabled bays. At the rear is a range in two storeys with seven bays.
Superintendent's house	Longmoor Lane; 53.4700°N 2.9228°W	The house is built in common brick, with dressings of red brick and stone, and a slate roof with a tiled crest. It is in two storeys, with two gables on the front. These have bargeboards and contain decorative timber-work. To the left of centre is a single storey bay window, and there is another bay window on the south front. The other windows are sashes.
Superintendent's office and laundry block	Longmoor Lane; 53.4714°N 2.9241°W	An office and a laundry block built in common brick, with dressings of red brick and stone, and a slate roof with a tiled crest. It is in one storey, with a two-bay front and a range at the rear. The first bay has a gable containing diapering, and a canted bay window with a hipped roof. To the left of this is a porch. The range at the rear has a lunette window.
Willow House	Longmoor Lane; 53.4717°N 2.9233°W	Used as a day centre, it is built in common brick, with dressings of red brick and stone, and a slate roof with a tiled crest. It is in one storey, with a ten-bay front, consisting of a central two-bay block, and two three-bay pavilions with two-bay connecting blocks. The central block has two gables with brick bands and diapering, and decorative bargeboards. The windows are sashes. In the left pavilion is a projecting conservatory with Doric columns and a hipped roof.
Magnolia	1 Longmoor Lane; 53.4699°N 2.9236°W	A house built in common brick, with dressings of red brick and stone, and a slate roof. The house is in two storeys, and has a three-bay front. The first bay projects forward and has a timbered gable. The third bay has a bay window containing a 20th-century casement. The other windows are sashes.
Ash	3 Longmoor Lane; 53.4701°N 2.9237°W	A house built in common brick, with dressings of red brick and stone, and a slate roof. The house is in two storeys, and has a five-bay front. The outer two bays project forward and have gables with decorative bargeboards. In the gables are brick bands and cartouches. The windows are sashes.
Alder	4 Longmoor Lane; 53.4702°N 2.9229°W	A house built in common brick, with dressings of red brick and stone, and a slate roof. The house is in two storeys, and has a five-bay front. The outer two bays project forward and have gables with decorative bargeboards. In the gables are brick bands and cartouches. The windows are sashes.
Blackthorn	5 Longmoor Lane; 53.4703°N 2.9237°W	A house built in common brick, with dressings of red brick and stone, and a slate roof. The house is in two storeys, and has a five-bay front. The outer two bays project forward and have gables with decorative bargeboards. In the gables are brick bands and cartouches. The windows are sashes.
Maple	6 Longmoor Lane; 53.4705°N 2.9230°W	A house built in common brick, with dressings of red brick and stone, and a slate roof. The house is in two storeys, and has a five-bay front. The outer two bays project forward and have gables with decorative bargeboards. In the gables are brick bands and cartouches. The windows are sashes.
Rowan	7 Longmoor Lane; 53.4705°N 2.9238°W	A house built in common brick, with dressings of red brick and stone, and a slate roof. The house is in two storeys, and has a five-bay front. The outer two bays project forward and have gables with decorative bargeboards. In the gables are brick bands and cartouches. The windows are sashes.
Rose	8 Longmoor Lane; 53.4707°N 2.9231°W	A house built in common brick, with dressings of red brick and stone, and a slate roof. The house is in two storeys, and has a five-bay front. The outer two bays project forward and have gables with decorative bargeboards. In the gables are brick bands and cartouches. The windows are sashes.
Larch	9 Longmoor Lane; 53.4707°N 2.9239°W	A house built in common brick, with dressings of red brick and stone, and a slate roof. The house is in two storeys, and has a five-bay front. The outer two bays project forward and have gables with decorative bargeboards. In the gables are brick bands and cartouches. The windows are sashes.
Spindle	10 Longmoor Lane; 53.4709°N 2.9231°W	A house built in common brick, with dressings of red brick and stone, and a slate roof. The house is in two storeys, and has a five-bay front. The outer two bays project forward and have gables with decorative bargeboards. In the gables are brick bands and cartouches. The windows are sashes.
Pine	11 Longmoor Lane; 53.4710°N 2.9239°W	A house built in common brick, with dressings of red brick and stone, and a slate roof. The house is in two storeys, and has a five-bay front. The outer two bays project forward and have gables with decorative bargeboards. In the gables are brick bands and cartouches. The windows are sashes.
Holly	12 Longmoor Lane; 53.4711°N 2.92312°W	A house built in common brick, with dressings of red brick and stone, and a slate roof. The house is in two storeys, and has a five-bay front. The outer two bays project forward and have gables with decorative bargeboards. In the gables are brick bands and cartouches. The windows are sashes.
Sycamore	13 Longmoor Lane; 53.4712°N 2.9240°W	A house built in common brick, with dressings of red brick and stone, and a slate roof. The house is in two storeys, and has a five-bay front. The outer two bays project forward and have gables with decorative bargeboards. In the gables are brick bands and cartouches. The windows are sashes.
Aspen	14 Longmoor Lane; 53.4713°N 2.9233°W	A house built in common brick, with dressings of red brick and stone, and a slate roof. The house is in two storeys, and has a five-bay front. The outer two bays project forward and have gables with decorative bargeboards. In the gables are brick bands and cartouches. The windows are sashes.
Juniper	15 Longmoor Lane; 53.4723°N 2.9246°W	A house built in common brick, with dressings of red brick and stone, and a slate roof. The house is in two storeys, and has a five-bay front. The outer two bays project forward and have gables with decorative bargeboards. In the gables are brick bands and cartouches. The windows are sashes.
Hawthorne	16 Longmoor Lane; 53.4726°N 2.9236°W	A house built in common brick, with dressings of red brick and stone, and a slate roof. The house is in two storeys, and has a five-bay front. The outer two bays project forward and have gables with decorative bargeboards. In the gables are brick bands and cartouches. The windows are sashes.
Cherry	17 Longmoor Lane; 53.4726°N 2.9244°W	A house built in common brick, with dressings of red brick and stone, and a slate roof. The house is in two storeys, and has a five-bay front. The outer two bays project forward and have gables with decorative bargeboards. In the gables are brick bands and cartouches. The windows are sashes.
Poplar	18 Longmoor Lane; 53.4729°N 2.9237°W	A house built in common brick, with dressings of red brick and stone, and a slate roof. The house is in two storeys, and has a five-bay front. The outer two bays project forward and have gables with decorative bargeboards. In the gables are brick bands and cartouches. The windows are sashes.
Laburnum	19 Longmoor Lane; 53.4728°N 2.9245°W	A house built in common brick, with dressings of red brick and stone, and a slate roof. The house is in two storeys, and has a five-bay front. The outer two bays project forward and have gables with decorative bargeboards. In the gables are brick bands and cartouches. The windows are sashes.
Oak	20 Longmoor Lane; 53.4731°N 2.9238°W	A house built in common brick, with dressings of red brick and stone, and a slate roof. The house is in two storeys, and has a five-bay front. The outer two bays project forward and have gables with decorative bargeboards. In the gables are brick bands and cartouches. The windows are sashes.
Lilac	21 Longmoor Lane; 53.4730°N 2.9246°W	A house built in common brick, with dressings of red brick and stone, and a slate roof. The house is in two storeys, and has a five-bay front. The outer two bays project forward and have gables with decorative bargeboards. In the gables are brick bands and cartouches. The windows are sashes.

== See also ==
- Architecture of Liverpool
