= Listed buildings in Woodside, Merseyside =

Woodside is a suburb of Birkenhead, Wirral, Merseyside, England. It contains two buildings that are recorded in the National Heritage List for England as designated listed buildings, all of which are listed at Grade II. This grade is the lowest of the three gradings given to listed buildings and is applied to "buildings of national importance and special interest". The listed buildings are structures at one of the entrances to Birkenhead Docks, and a ferry terminal booking hall.

| Name and location | Photograph | Date | Notes |
|---|---|---|---|
| Police booth and gate piers 53.39544°N 3.01191°W | | 1868 | The structures are at the entrance to Birkenhead Docks, with the former police booth in the centre of the road and the gate piers flanking it. They are in rusticated sandstone. The police booth has a slate roof, it is in a single storey, and has polygonal ends. Each structure stands on a large plinth and has a cornice; the police booth also has a parapet. |
| Booking Hall to Ferry Terminal; 53.39533°N 3.00940°W | | Late 19th century | The ferry terminal building is iron-framed with boarded cladding. The front has eight bays along the front and four bays on the sides. On the front is a canopy carried on cast iron columns with decorative brackets. In the centre of the roof is a gabled dormer containing a clock. |
