= Grade II listed buildings in Liverpool-L14 =

Liverpool is a city and port in Merseyside, England, which contains many listed buildings. A listed building is a structure designated by English Heritage of being of architectural and/or of historical importance and, as such, is included in the National Heritage List for England. There are three grades of listing, according to the degree of importance of the structure. Grade I includes those buildings that are of "exceptional interest, sometimes considered to be internationally important"; the buildings in Grade II* are "particularly important buildings of more than special interest"; and those in Grade II are "nationally important and of special interest". Very few buildings are included in Grade I — only 2.5% of the total. Grade II* buildings represent 5.5% of the total, while the great majority, 92%, are included in Grade II.

Liverpool contains more than 1,550 listed buildings, of which 28 are in Grade I, 109 in Grade II*, and the rest in Grade II. (Note: These figures are taken from a search in the National Heritage List for England in May 2013, and are subject to variation as further buildings are listed, grades are revised, or buildings are delisted.) This list contains the Grade II listed buildings in the L14 postal district of Liverpool. The district is a suburb of Liverpool, and includes the area known as Knotty Ash.

Grade II listed buildings from other areas in the city can be found through the box on the right, along with the lists of the Grade I and Grade II* buildings in the city.

== Buildings ==
| Name | Location | Photograph | Built | Notes |
|---|---|---|---|---|
| Drinking fountain | East Prescot Road; 53.41802°N 2.89333°W | | 1887 | The drinking fountain is in stone. It consists of a recess with a rusticated surround, and a projecting basin. A niche contains an inscription. Below the basin is a smaller one for dogs. |
| Ivy Dairy Farm | 256 East Prescot Road; 53.4176°N 2.8937°W | | Early 19th century | A brick house with stone dressings and a slate roof. It has two storeys and extends for three bays. The windows have wedge lintels and are sashes. The round-headed entrance has a Doric doorcase with a fanlight. |
| Nelson Monument | Springfield Park; 53.41810°N 2.89672°W | | c. 1805 | This is an obelisk to the memory of Lord Nelson. It has a stone base with recessed panels and a cornice, and is surrounded by a low wall. The monument was intended for Exchange Flags in the centre of the city, but was rejected. |
| Guide post | Thingwall Lane; 53.41452°N 2.89185°W | | 1770 | A tall stone mile post with a block at the top inscribed with directions to Broad Green and to Thingwall Lane. On the rear is a cross moline. |
| Dove Cottages | Thingwall Lane; 53.4140°N 2.8903°W | | Early 19th century | This originated as stables for Dovecot Hall, which has been demolished. It is a stuccoed building with a slate roof, in two storeys, and extending for eight bays. The central two bays project forward, and have a pediment containing a clock face. At the top of the building is a cornice and a parapet. |
| Church of St John the Evangelist | Thomas Lane; 53.4161°N 2.8913°W | | 1834–36 | The chancel and a south chapel were added in 1890 by Aldridge and Deacon. The church is built in stone with a slate roof. It consists of a nave with aisles, a chancel and south chapel, and a west tower. The tower has octagonal turrets and pinnacles, clock faces on three sides, an embattled parapet, and a thin spire. The windows have Perpendicular tracery. Inside the church the arcades are carried on slender columns, and have four-centred arches. |
| Sewer vent | Thomas Lane; 53.41085°N 2.89297°W | | 1860s | The sewer vent consists of an iron pipe with a conical cap. |
| — | 28 Thomas Lane; 53.41672°N 2.89277°W | | Early 19th century | The house is built in brick with a hipped slate roof. It is in two storeys and extends for three bays. The windows are sashes, and the entrance is round-headed. |
| — | 30 Thomas Lane; 53.41665°N 2.89267°W | | Early 19th century | The house is built in brick with stone dressings and a slate roof. It is in two storeys and extends for two bays. The entrance and the windows have wedge lintels; the windows are horizontal-sliding sashes. |
| Oak House | 76 Thomas Lane; 53.4153°N 2.8918°W | | 1784 | A brick house with stone dressings and a slate roof. It has two storeys and extends for three bays. The windows are a mix of sashes and casements. On the house is a plaque inscribed with initials and the date. It was the former home of Ken Dodd. |

== See also ==
- Architecture of Liverpool

== References and notes ==
Notes

Citations

Sources

- Pollard, Richard; Pevsner, Nikolaus (2006), Lancashire: Liverpool and the South-West, The Buildings of England, New Haven and London: Yale University Press, ISBN 0-300-10910-5
