= Listed buildings in Saughall Massie =

Saughall Massie is a village in Wirral, Merseyside, England. It contains six buildings that are recorded in the National Heritage List for England as designated listed buildings, all of which are listed at Grade II. This grade is the lowest of the three gradings given to listed buildings and is applied to "buildings of national importance and special interest". The listed buildings comprise four houses, an outbuilding, and a bridge.

Name and location	Photograph	Date	Notes
Ivy Cottage; 53.38880°N 3.12466°W	—	1660	A thatched stone house with a brick wing, and with a small brick bay with a slate roof. Some of the windows are mullioned, some contain casements, some have horizontally-sliding sash windows, and there is an eyebrow dormer. In the angle is a 20th-century porch.
The Elms; 53.39009°N 3.12370°W	—	1670	A roughcast house with a slate roof, in two storeys and two bays. The windows are casements, and most are mullioned.
Poplar Farmhouse; 53.38932°N 3.12371°W	—	1714	The farmhouse is in brick on a stone base, with stone dressings and a slate roof, in two storeys and two bays. The entrance has a segmental head, and the windows are casements. On the left side is a lean-to porch, and on the right is a single-storey one-bay extension.
Diamond Farmhouse and barn 53.39046°N 3.12380°W	—	1728	The farmhouse and barn are in brick on a stone base, with stone dressings and a slate roof. The farmhouse has two storeys and two bays, with a datestone on the front. The entrance has a segmental head, and the windows are sashes. The barn has three bays, a blocked entrance, and ventilation slots and pitch holes in the gable end.
Saughall Massie Bridge; 53.38850°N 3.12305°W		1829–30	A sandstone road bridge crossing Arrowe Brook by Thomas Brassey and William Lawton; it is the first structure constructed by Brassey. The bridge has a single segmental arch and a parapet, and carries a single carriageway with footpaths on each side.
Outbuilding, Poplar Farm; 53.38924°N 3.12347°W	—	1840s	The outbuilding is in stone with a slate roof. It has two bays, the left bay having one storey, and the second with two. In the left bay is a small entrance, and in the right bay is an elliptical-headed cart entrance. On the right side are steps leading up to a first floor entrance.
