= West Derby Cemetery =

Cemetery in Liverpool, England

Coordinates: 53°27′15″N 2°54′54″W

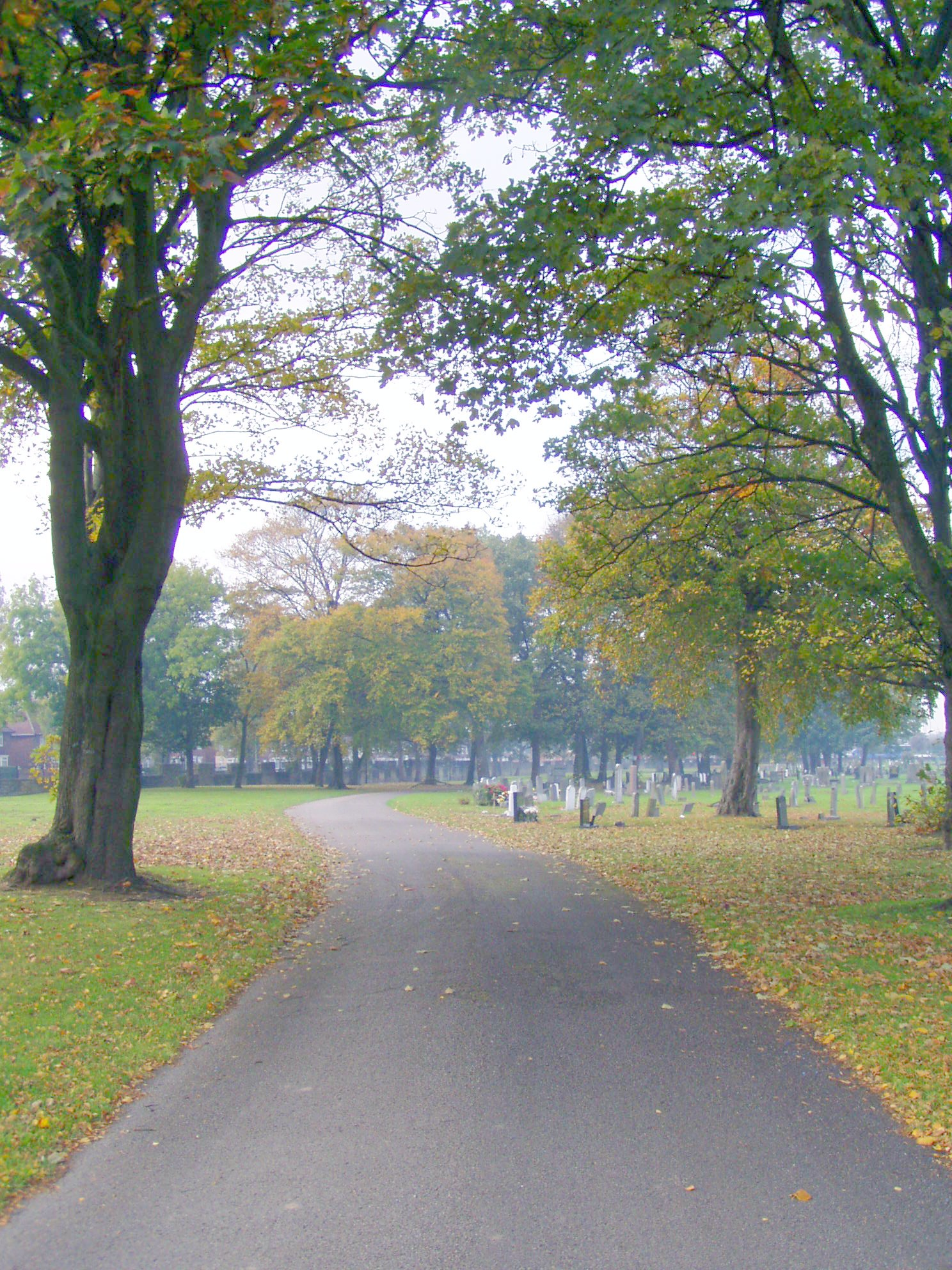
- Path at West Derby Cemetery
- Interactive map of West Derby Cemetery

Details
- Location: Croxteth
- Country: England
- Type: Public
- Owned by: Liverpool City Council
- Website: liverpool-ancestors.co.uk
- Find a Grave: West Derby Cemetery

West Derby Cemetery, Lower House Lane, Croxteth. Opened in January 1884 it has been used for Church of England, Roman Catholic and Jewish burials. Various buildings at the cemetery are Grade II listed buildings.

The cemetery contains 108 Commonwealth service war graves of World War I and 129 of World War II, scattered in the different denominational plots. Marked war graves from the latter war include Czech Battle of Britain veteran Jindrich Bartos (within Roman Catholic section). Casualties whose graves could not be marked by CWGC headstones are listed on the two denominational Screen Wall memorials. The CWGC also care for 2 foreign nationals' war graves.

== Notable burials ==
- Peter Craven
- Tommy Burns (diver)
- Freddie Starr

== Gallery ==
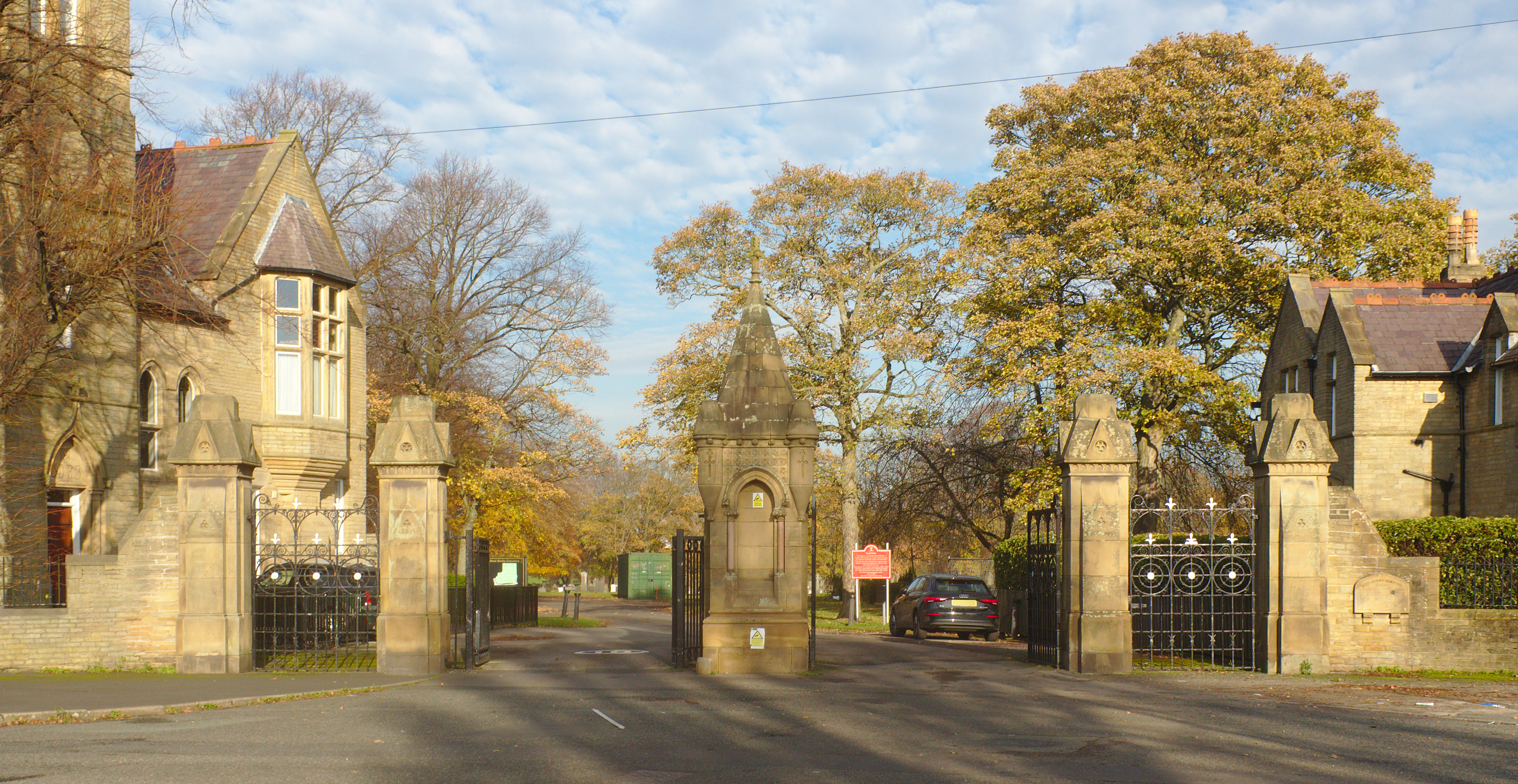
Entrance to West Derby Cemetery

== See also ==
- Burial Act 1857
