= Grade II listed buildings in Liverpool-L16 =

Liverpool is a city and port in Merseyside, England, which contains many listed buildings. A listed building is a structure designated by English Heritage of being of architectural and/or of historical importance and, as such, is included in the National Heritage List for England. There are three grades of listing, according to the degree of importance of the structure. Grade I includes those buildings that are of "exceptional interest, sometimes considered to be internationally important"; the buildings in Grade II* are "particularly important buildings of more than special interest"; and those in Grade II are "nationally important and of special interest". Very few buildings are included in Grade I — only 2.5% of the total. Grade II* buildings represent 5.5% of the total, while the great majority, 92%, are included in Grade II.

Liverpool contains more than 1,550 listed buildings, of which 28 are in Grade I, 109 in Grade II*, and the rest in Grade II. (Note: These figures are taken from a search in the National Heritage List for England in May 2013, and are subject to variation as further buildings are listed, grades are revised, or buildings are delisted.) This list contains the Grade II listed buildings in the L16 postal district of Liverpool. The district includes part of the suburb of Childwall. The six listed buildings in the district consist of houses and structures associated with them, a public house, and a former hearse house.

Grade II listed buildings from other areas in the city can be found through the box on the right, along with the lists of the Grade I and Grade II* buildings in the city.

== Buildings ==
Name	Location	Photograph	Built	Notes
Hearse House, All Saints' Church	Childwall Abbey Road; 53.39530°N 2.88200°W		1811	The former hearse house is sited in the churchyard of All Saints. It has an embattled parapet, and an elliptical-headed entrance. The entrance is flanked by buttresses, which rise to form pinnacles in the form of obelisks.
Childwall Abbey Hotel	Childwall Abbey Road; 53.3953°N 2.8824°W		Early 19th century	The public house is built in sandstone and has a hipped slate roof and an embattled parapet. It incorporates fabric from earlier dates. The building has two storeys, and an east front of three bays, the lateral two of which are canted. The south front is in seven bays. Most of the windows are casements with ogee heads.
Lodge, Childwall Hall	Childwall Abbey Road; 53.39454°N 2.88854°W		Early 19th century	The hall was demolished in 1949. The lodge stands to the west of the former hall, and is built in stone. It has two storeys, and is in three bays, the first bay being lower and recessed, and containing a round-headed entrance. The windows are lancets containing casements. At the top of the building is an embattled parapet.
Elm House	Childwall Abbey Road; 53.3949°N 2.8808°W		Early 19th century	A sandstone house with a slate roof. It has two storeys, and is in three bays. The windows are sashes. Along the top of the house is an embattled parapet.
Stable block, Elm House	Childwall Abbey Road; 53.3950°N 2.8803°W		Early 19th century	The former stable block is constructed in stone, and has a slate roof. The side facing Well Lane is gabled, and contains two pitching holes, one above the other. There are more pitching holes on the left side, and a 20th-century garage door.
Stable and coachhouse, St Joseph's Home	Woolton Road; 53.38969°N 2.89726°W	—	c. 1840s	The stable and coachhouse were designed by A. W. N. Pugin for a house then called Oswaldcroft. The building is in stone with a slate roof, and a gable end on Green Lane. It is rectangular, and its features include square pitch holes, ventilation slots (now blocked), a dormer, and a cross on the gable.

== See also ==
Architecture of Liverpool

== References and notes ==
Notes

Citations

Sources

- Pollard, Richard; Pevsner, Nikolaus (2006), Lancashire: Liverpool and the South-West, The Buildings of England, New Haven and London: Yale University Press, ISBN 0-300-10910-5
