= Everton Cemetery =

Cemetery in Liverpool, England

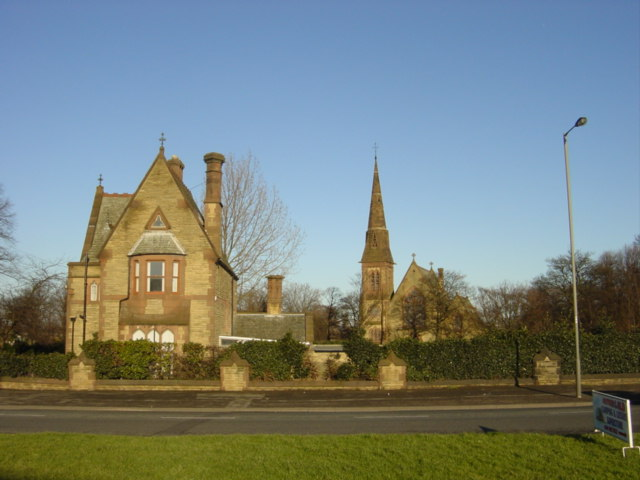
- Interactive map of Everton Cemetery

Details
- Established: July 1880
- Location: Fazakerley, Liverpool, Merseyside
- Country: England
- Coordinates: 53.457°N 2.942°W
- Type: Public
- Owned by: Liverpool City Council
- Website: liverpool-ancestors.co.uk
- Find a Grave: Everton Cemetery

Everton Cemetery, in Long Lane, Fazakerley, Liverpool, opened in July 1880.

== History ==
The site for the cemetery was bought in 1876/7, and John Houlding's building company was contracted to develop the site with its three mortuary chapels, gatehouses, boundary walls and gates. Houlding, the founder of Liverpool F.C., was also the first Chairman of the Everton Burial Board. Everton Cemetery was officially opened on 16 July 1880.

Many of the headstones in Everton Cemetery date back much further than its opening. Whenever work was undertaken in the city, like widening of roads or dock gates, if this work cut into the city's graveyards, the bodies would be exhumed, and moved to Everton, along with their headstones. Sections of Everton Cemetery contain many of these graves, from the likes of St Anne's Church (1772-1871), Church of Our Lady and St. Nicholas, and St. George's, to name but a few.

On 31 August 1898, Liverpool's Necropolis Cemetery (Low Hill/Everton), was closed, due to an edict of the City Council, citing the unsanitary conditions spreading to surrounding neighbourhoods, plus the fact that the cemetery was nearing its full capacity of 80,000 burials. The old headstones were 'dropped' over the graves, and subsequently landscaped in the early 1910s, to make Grant Gardens a public park, which was opened by City Alderman J.R. Grant in 1914.

Headstones from 'active' private plots at the Necropolis were removed to Everton Cemetery, along with much older headstones and remains from church graveyards within the city boundaries, when public works, such as road-widening or improvements to the riverside docks were undertaken in the early 1900s, which cut into these old burial sites.

The majority of standing Necropolis Headstones at Everton Cemetery are in the centre of Section GEN6; however, there are a few of these headstones placed in other religious denomination sections of the cemetery. Older 'dropped' headstones and remains, from churches within the city, long gone, are buried in the outer boundary sections of Everton Cemetery (CE32-38).

The gates to the cemetery, the lodge and the chapel are all Grade II listed buildings.

== War graves ==
Everton Cemetery is also described (by the Commonwealth War Graves Commission) as Liverpool (Everton) Cemetery.

In December 1914, Liverpool became one of the 21 Auxiliary Patrol Bases and, in February 1915, the base of the 10th Cruiser Squadron during the First World War. During the Second World War, Liverpool was the headquarters of Western Approaches Command and a manning depot for officers and men of the Merchant Navy who agreed to serve with the Royal Navy for the duration of the war.

Liverpool (Everton) Cemetery contains 55 First World War burials and 15 from the Second World War. There is a small Screen Wall memorial bearing the names of those whose graves are not marked by headstones. During the First World War, almost 700 American servicemen died in Liverpool's military hospitals and most of them were buried in Everton cemetery. Their remains were later removed in 1920 to the American military cemetery at Brookwood, or to the United States. There are 71 identified Commonwealth service war casualties buried at Everton.

== Yagan's head ==
The head of Aboriginal Australian warrior Yagan (c. 1795–1833), after being kept in Liverpool Museum, was buried in the cemetery in 1964 (General Section 16, grave number 296), in a box also containing a Peruvian mummy and a Maori's head that had also been kept by the museum.

After lobbying of British and Australian governments by Noongar tribal representatives, the head was exhumed in 1997 (despite a common grave of 22 infant children having been made over it in intervening years) for repatriation and reburial in Belhus, Western Australia.

== See also ==
- Burial Act 1857
