= Woodchurch =

Woodchurch may refer to the following places in England:

- Woodchurch, Kent, Ashford
- Woodchurch, a hamlet in Manston, Thanet
- Woodchurch, Merseyside
  - Woodchurch railway station, a proposed station
  - Woodchurch High School
