= Acrobat (disambiguation) =

An acrobat is one who practises acrobatics.

Acrobat may also refer to:

== Computers ==
- Adobe Acrobat, a family of computer programs
- Acrobat.com, a suite of hosted document exchange services from Adobe Systems

== Music ==
- "Acrobat" (U2 song), from U2's album Achtung Baby
- "Acrobat", a song from Maxïmo Park's album A Certain Trigger
- "Acrobat" (Jo Gwang-il song), from Jo Gwang-il's album Dark Adaptation
- Acrobat Records, an American independent record company
- The Acrobat (album), a 2026 album by Tenille Townes

== Film ==
- The Acrobat (1941 film), a French comedy film
- The Acrobat (2019 film), a Canadian drama film
- The Acrobats (film), a 1997 Italian drama film

== Visual arts ==
- The Acrobats (Doré), a 1874 painting by Gustave Doré
- Acrobats, a 1927 sculpture by Alan Durst
- The Acrobats, Chinese terracotta statues unearthed in 1999

== Other uses ==
- Paraavis Acrobat, a Russian paraglider design
