= List of works by Alan Durst =

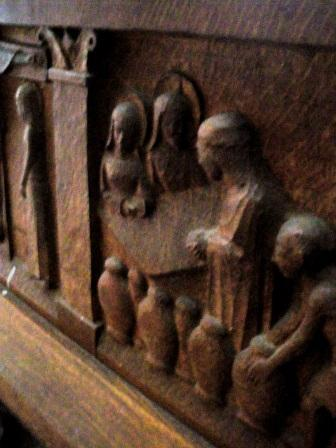
Alan Durst carving in Winchester Cathedral.

List of works by Alan Durst contains the works of sculptor Alan Durst, much of which was created for churches, chapels and cathedrals. Durst created many statues and other works that were intended for schools and private individuals.

His work was often carved in ivory, wood or stone. He drew inspiration from African art.

== Works ==
=== Notable works ===
==== Church of the Holy Cross, Woodchurch ====
Durst executed the rood screen and an ivory processional Cross for the Church of the Holy Cross. The rood screen was carved in 1933. The west side of the rood beam, facing the nave, features carvings of the Seven Sacraments represented as the fruit of the vine, which grows downwards from the foot of the cross above. From right to left the Sacraments are Baptism, Confirmation, Absolution, Holy Communion, holy orders, Holy Matrimony and Holy Unction. The figures on the supporting columns are - Augustine of Canterbury, Elijah, St Peter, St Luke, Moses, and St Columba. On the east side of the screen the Christ of the Apocalypse features at the top and on the beam beneath a priest is shown at the altar elevating the Host as the central act of the Church's worship. These two themes were proposed by the Reverend Bryan Robin who was the rector of the church at the time. Durst's carving include those on the uprights supporting the Rood Screen. The church is located in Woodchurch Cheshire, an area of Birkenhead on the Wirral Peninsula, England.

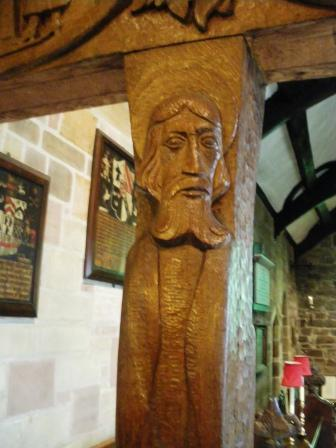
Upright on Woodchurch Rood

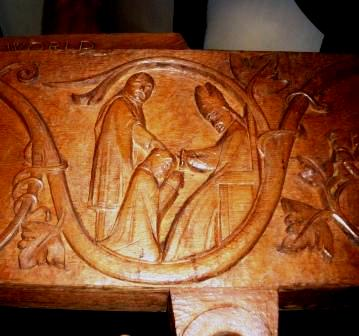
The sacrament of Holy Orders on the Woodchurch Rood Screen

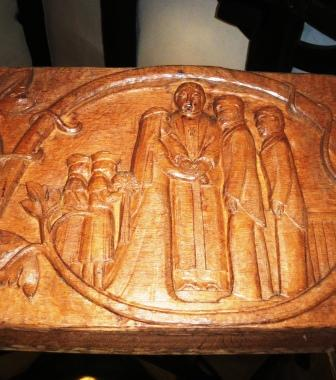
The sacrament of Matrimony on the Woodchurch Rood Screen

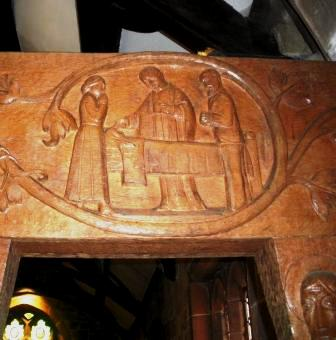
The sacrament of Holy Unction on the Woodchurch Rood Screen

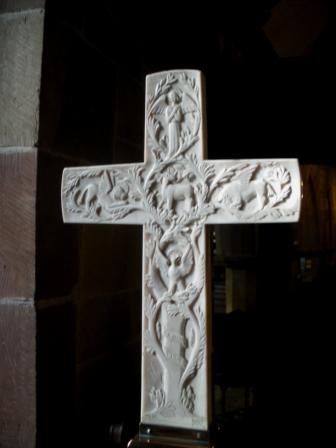
The "Tree of Life" carving on the Processional Cross

==== Holy Trinity Church, Northwood ====
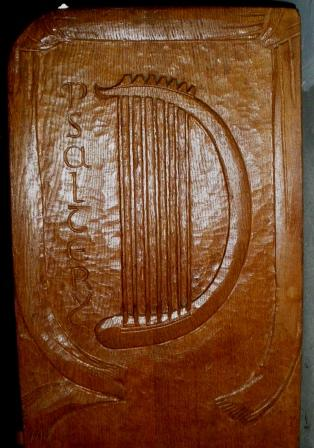
Northwood Instrument

Durst was responsible for carvings on the clergy and choir stalls for Holy Trinity Church in Northwood Middlesex. These were carved in 1957 from English oak and dedicated by The Bishop of London. The carvings express prayer, praise and harmony. The Vicar's stall on the right shows two angels kneeling in prayer at the step of an altar. Between them is a symbol of the Holy Trinity with the Cross set above the world, which is superimposed on three intersecting circles. The other clergy stall on the left symbolising praise shows two angels, each holding in one hand a crown and in the other a ribbon proclaiming: "Holy, Holy, Holy". The bench ends of the choir stalls express harmony. Firstly, those on the west end of the stalls represent from the left: trumpet, cymbal and pipe; and from the right, organ, lute and harp. On the east end of the benches on the left are lyre, lute and tabret; and on the right sackbut, cornet and psaltery. The photograph to the left shows one of Durst's carvings, this of a psalter.

==== Llandaff Cathedral ====
Durst made a carved font for Llandaff Cathedral in Llandaff Wales from Derbyshire stone. It includes scenes from the Bible including Eve giving her account of the temptation before God, Isaiah, St John and the Virgin and Child and the Life of St Teilo. On the upper part of the font the inscription reads: "QUI CREDERIT ET BAPTIZERATUS EVERIT SALVUS ERIT" (He that believeth and is baptized shall be saved). Part of the carving features the "Tree of Knowledge" with an angel before it holding a flaming sword. Eve kneels beneath the tree holding a tangled scroll. The Serpent is coiled around the tree and strikes at her heel. "SERPENS DECEPIT ME" (the serpent beguileth me). Isaiah prophesies the coming of Christ "ECCE VIRGO CONCIP" (Behold a Virgin shall conceive). The Tree of Life is shown against which stands the Angel of the Annunciation. Mary kneels before the cradle-altar upon which lies the infant Christ. Durst carved Saint John's vision. "ET FOLIO LIGNI AD SALVATEM CENTIUM" (The leaves of the Tree shall be for the healing of the Nations). On the pedestal is the Welsh inscription "A DUW NID DA IMDURAW" (It is not good to strive against God) followed by references to St Teilo's life.

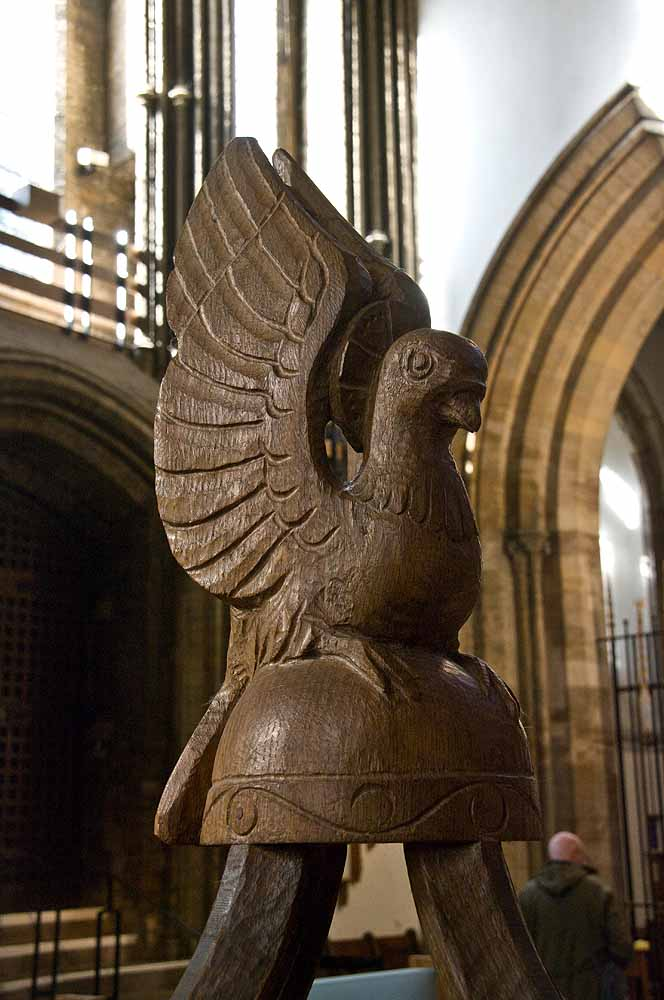

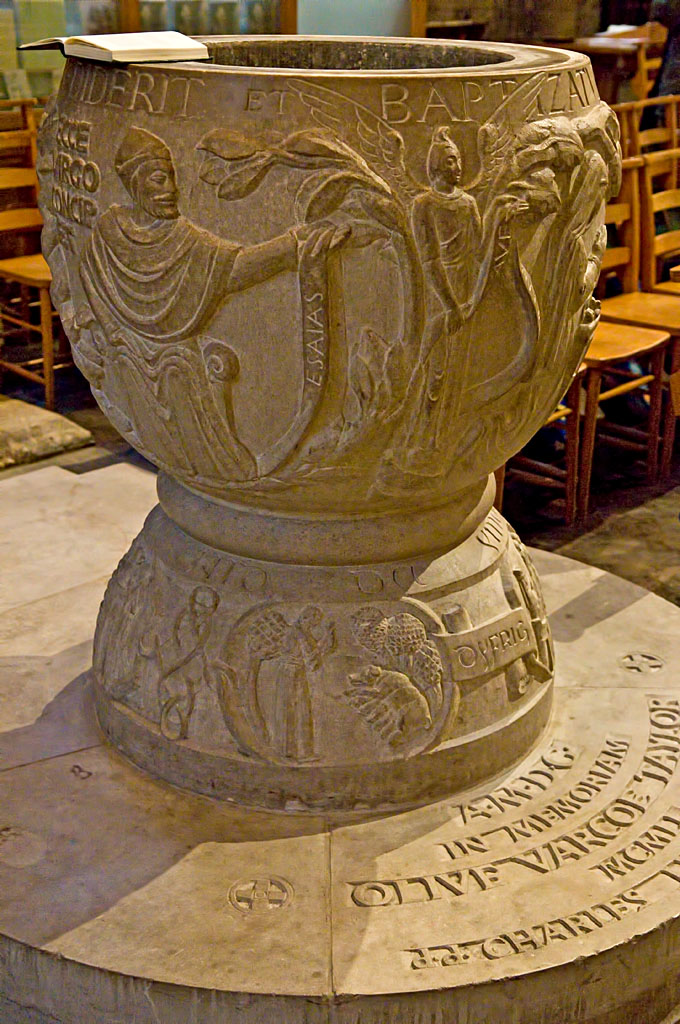
Relief on Llandaff Font

==== Manchester Cathedral ====
Durst executed several works for Manchester Cathedral The first can be seen in an oak panel above the south porch of the Good Shepherd and another work on the exterior tower. (Note: The panel above the south porch dates from 1950 and depicts the Good Shepherd (bearded) with a crook in his right hand and holding a lamb under his left arm. On his right are four sheep with two lambs, and on his left five sheep. Both the outside and inside surfaces of the lintel have inscriptions. On the outer surface of the lintel is inscribed-"I AM THE DOOR OF THE SHEEP" and on the inner surface of the lintel the inscription reads-"THE LORD BE WITH YOU GO IN PEACE". On the left side of the Tympanum "ET/FLET/UNAM/OVILE" is inscribed and on the right hand side "ET/UNUS/PASTOR". Durst also worked with Walter Miller on a regimental cross in the Manchester Regiment Regimental Chapel. The cross is constructed of ebony and ivory. The base of the cross is rectangular, the edging scalloped, this design repeated in two tiers on the upright stand of the cross. The edging of the cross is outlined in a relief of a wheat ear. On the arms of the cross, in ivory relief, are two kneeling angels with folded wings. On the head of the cross is an ivory crown. In the centre of the cross is a regimental sword embossed with the Lancashire Rose in relief over the sword and a motif of the crown of thorns also in ivory. The cross and candlesticks originally belonged to the Manchester Regiment, survived the war and have always been kept in the Regimental Chapel. Durst also carved several angels in the roof of the Regimental Chapel. These were in English oak and carved in 1952. These appear on the west-facing side of the tie-beams which were in-filled with eight moulded panels onto which are centrally placed two flying angels holding between them a coat of arms. One coat of arms represents the dove, the "Emblem of the Holy Spirit", another the Arms of Queen Elizabeth, The Queen Mother, who was Colonel-in-Chief of the Manchester Regiment, another the Arms of the City of Manchester, another the Arms of the Earl of Derby and another the fleur-de-lys, this being the badge emblem of the Regiment.) He carved angels of the roof of the Cathedral holding between them a coat of arms of Queen Elizabeth and The Queen Mother.

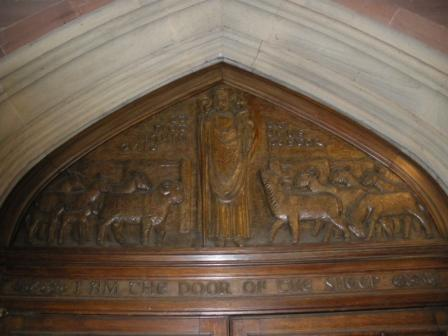
The entire relief

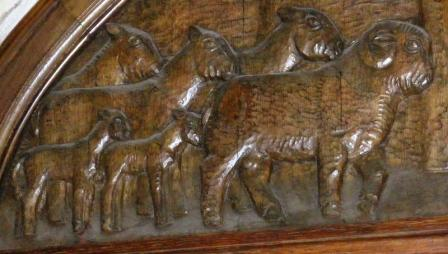
Durst's carving over the South Porch, Manchester Cathedral

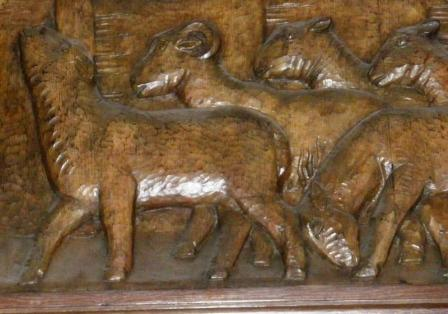
The right side of Alan Durst's carving over the South Porch

==== Royal Academy of Dramatic Art ====
Durst sculpted the masks of Comedy and of Tragedy above the entrance to the Royal Academy of Dramatic Art, Bloomsbury, London

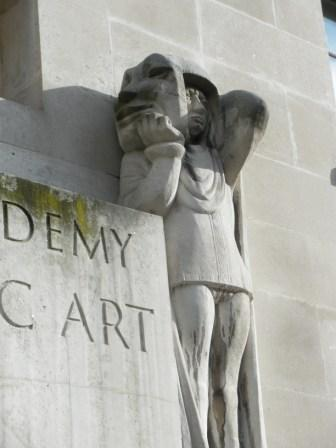
Part of Durst's sculpture over the entrance to the Royal Academy of Dramatic Art.

==== St Alphege Church, Solihull ====
For St Alphege Church in Solihull Warwickshire, Durst carved figures on the church corbels in the chancel. They were installed in 1950/1951. See record DRB64/203 held at the Warwickshire County Record Office. One of the figures is shown below; an angel with chalice.

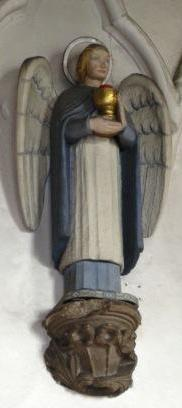
St Alphege Church in Solihull. Figure on church corbel.

==== St Christopher's Church ====
Durst carved a font in Alcaster stone for St Christopher's Church in Withington near Manchester.

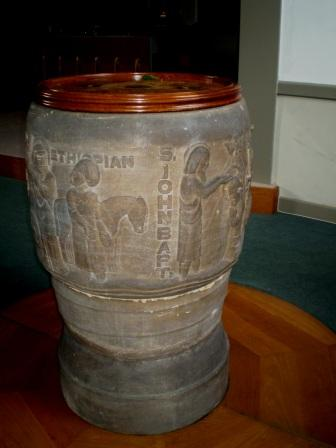
Font in St Christopher's Church in Withington

==== Winchester Cathedral ====
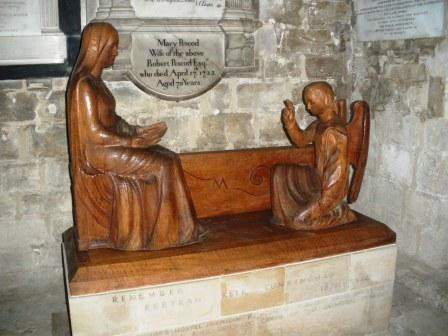
Durst carvings in Winchester Cathedral

Durst carried out some carving on the memorial in Winchester Cathedral in Hampshire to Canon Bertram Kier Cunningham, this memorial completed in 1944. The carving was shown at the Royal Academy in 1942 before going to Winchester. It can be found in the east aisle in front of the tablet to Mary Pescod. The carving is a representation of "The Annunciation" and features the Angel Gabriel appearing before the Virgin Mary and greeting her with the words "Greetings, favoured one, the Lord is with you" - "Ave, gratia plena, Dominus tecum" or more simply "Ave Maria". Gabriel tells Mary that she would bear a son to be called Jesus. As is often the case Mary is shown reading a book on which would be written "Ecce virgo concipiet et pariet filium" ("Behold, the Virgin will conceive and will give birth to a son" - Isaiah 7:14). At the back of the work Durst carved several reliefs including a representation of the turning water into wine. As the whole piece is close to a wall Durst's reliefs are not seen to their best advantage and are difficult to photograph. Just behind Mary, Durst has carved a dove in which form the Holy Spirit was said to have descended on Mary. Mary replied to Gabriel with the words "Behold the handmaiden of the Lord, let it be to me according to your will" Luke 1:26-38. It is believed that the conception of Jesus took place at this moment and the "Festival of the Annunciation" is held on 25 March, exactly nine months before the birth of Jesus is celebrated. Durst was commissioned to carve birds on the terminals of the Winchester Cathedral Drip mouldings round the windows. The birds included woodpeckers, a thrush, robin, blackbird, wren, jackdaw, owl, seagull and a nesting swallow.

=== Other works ===
==== Churches ====
Work	Image	Location	Notes and References
Canterbury Cathedral		Canterbury, Kent	Durst's works in Canterbury Cathedral include a carved ivory and ebony crucifix and candlesticks for St Augustine's Chapel in Canterbury Cathedral.
Cawood Church		Cawood, Yorkshire	For Cawood church near Selby in Yorkshire Durst carved a Madonna and Child for the church in 1961 to replace a previous sculpture which had been lost in 1938.
Christ Church		Chalford, Gloucestershire	In 1947 Durst carved an oak reredos for this church. It takes form of a triptych with a carving of Jesus Christ in the centre with kneeling angels on either side. The two side panels hold paintings by Nan Reid and on the outer wing left Durst has carved Matthew and on the outer wing right John.
Church of St Andrew and St Mary		How Caple, Herefordshire	Durst carved an Altar Cross and Candesticks in walnut and ivory.
Church of St Illtyds		Llantwit Major	Durst carved a rood beam and a rood which depicts Jesus Christ in the centre with Mary on the left and John on the right. This work dates from 1954.
Heswall Church		Heswall, Cheshire	Durst executed a memorial tablet for the church dedicated to a sailor who died when the submarine "Thetis" sank in 1939. At the bottom of the tablet are the words- "They that go down to the sea in ships / That do business in great waters / These see the works of the LORD / And his wonders in the deep."
Holy Trinity		Seer Green, Buckinghamshire	Durst carved an oak reredos for this church in 1956. The reredos features five figures with Jesus Christ in the centre. The words "BELOVED LET US LOVE ONE ANOTHER FOR LOVE IS OF GOD" are inscribed at the bottom. Here is a photograph showing Christ and two other figures.
Marlborough College Chapel			Durst carved an altar cross and candlesticks in ivory and ebony for this chapel, these dating from 1928. The altar cross bears the inscription "The Tree of Life 19 ALD 28".
Painswick Church		Painswick, Gloucestershire	The Dickinson Memorial in this church was carved by Durst from Hopton Wood Stone.
Peterborough Cathedral		Peterborough	Works for Peterborough Cathedral include an ivory Annunciation in St Kyneburgha's chapel. Durst completed several replacement figures for the West Front between 1949 and 1965. These include the figures of St James the Less, St John and St Thomas added in 1949, the figure of Grosseteste added in 1958, St Kyneburgha and the replacement head for King Peada and Abbott Saxulph, all added in 1959 together with Aethelwold and the head of St Dunstan added in 1965. Photograph courtesy of Stiffleaf
St Andrew the Apostle		Bolton upon Dearne, Yorkshire	Durst carved a hanging rood for this church.
St John the Evangelist		Newbury, Berkshire	Durst's carvings around the sides of this church's font depict the principal events in the life of Jesus and each scene is interspaced by an angel. We see a scene featuring Mary, Joseph, the Shepherds, the Wise Men and the Lamb at Jesus' birth, the Baptism of Jesus by John the Baptist and the Last Supper showing Jesus with his disciples. Many of the disciples are named on the halos around their heads. We also see the risen Jesus in the garden with Mary Magdalene.
St Leonard		Middleton, Lancashire	An ivory and ebony altar cross was carved for this church.
St Martin of Tours		Middlesbrough, Yorkshire	Durst created a "Majestas Domini" carving for this church.
St Mary the Great		Cambridge, Cambridgeshire	Durst created a "Christ in Majesty" scene in gilded wood for St Mary the Great Church in Cambridge, which is the university church. Alan Durst's work was installed as a reredos in 1960. The photograph is an original image by Martin Beek.
St Matthew's		Brixton, South London	A processional cross in ivory and ebony was made for this church in 1919.
St Matthews		Hutton Buscel, Yorkshire	Durst carved for the church a statue of St Matthew, which stands in a niche in the South Porch.
St Michael and All Angels		Tettenhall, Wolverhampton	Durst carved four guardian angels in the sanctuary roof. Each angel carries a symbol: 1) the paten, 2) the chalice, these representing the Eucharis, 3) the censer indicating the offering of prayer and worship and 4) the trumpet symbolizing the proclaiming of the gospel.
St Paul's		Bury, Lancashire	Two carved heads were made by Durst for Churchwardens' staves. This church has closed but the staves are still used when the congregation meets at St Paul's Parish School.
St Peter's		Petersfield, Hampshire	Durst carved an altar cross for this church which takes the form of a Crucifix, with the bearded figure of Christ in draped cape and robe, crowned and with a halo, closed eyes, outstretched arms and open hands, and with feet supported on a sloping ledge. It is carved in one piece and stands on a dome-shaped base in which is incised the symbol "Chi Rho". Above the figure is a chalice within a double entwined raised circle representing Faith. The piece is dated 1953 and the sculptor's name and the date 1953 are carved under the base. The altar cross is carved from English walnut. In the same Church are two wooden candlesticks carved by Durst. One has four motifs: crossed keys, an axe, a serpent and a sword. The other also has four themes, all winged objects with heads: haloed man, lion, ox, and eagle. Each has a carved inscription in roman caps and l/c on the base. The candlesticks are carved from English walnut and date from 1953. The photograph was supplied by Sacristan of St Peters.

==== Schools ====
Work	Image	Location	Notes and References
Kingswood School		Bath, Wiltshire	For Kingswood School in Bath, Durst carved an altar cross from walnut in 1937.The carving features a representation of the "Tree of Life" and the text on the base of the cross reads "The Leaves of the Tree were for the Healing of the Nations".
Merchant Taylors School		Northwood, Middlesex	For this school Durst executed 24 carvings in stone on the school's exterior of Sandy Lodge, Middlesex. These include "The Owl of Athene" and "The Raven of Apollo" on the outside of the Great Hall and "David", "Socrates", "Dante", "Shakespeare", "Goethe", "St Paul" and "Isaac Newton" on the outside of the library. Durst carried out this work in 1932.
Rossall School		Rossall, Lancashire	For Rossall School in Lancashire Durst executed three carvings over the doors of the dining hall. These are pierced gilt relief carvings in American basswood. One represents "fowl" and the other two "fish" and "flesh". Each has a base measurement of 2 feet 8 inches and a thickness of 3 inches.
St Chad's College, University of Durham.		Durham, County Durham	Durst carved a coat of arms for St Chad's College in the University of Durham. Clipsham stone was used.
T.A.Collins Langmoor School		Langmoor, Leicestershire	For Langmoor School in Leicestershire Durst carved an alabaster bear which stands in the school's foyer.
Uppingham School		Uppingham	Durst carved two cherubs in oak for the school's chapel in 1928.

==== Public statues ====
Work	Image	Location	Notes and References
Randolph Schwabe		Hampstead, London	Durst created a small statue in Portland stone commemorating Randolph Schwabe, the illustrator, draughtsman and costume designer. The statue was placed over Schwabe's ashes. The statue stands against the wall of a churchyard at Hampstead. Wrapped around the angel is a narrow banner on which is written: "Randolph Schwabe in whose life we have seen excellence in beauty."
Statue of St Boniface		Crediton, Devon	Durst sculpted a statue of St Boniface in Newcombes Meadow, Crediton, Devon. The Portland Stone statue of the young Boniface was unveiled on 24 July 1960 by Princess Margaret

==== Tombstones and graveyard sculptures ====
Work	Image	Location	Notes and References
Roos Churchyard		Roos, Yorkshire	Durst carved a calvary for the churchyard of the church. On the cross he has carved various items linked to the crucifixion: hammer and nails, dice and a dice-throwing cup and a crown of thorns.
Tombstone in Cumbria		Addingham, Cumbria	In the graveyard of St Michael Church, Addingham in Cumbria, Durst carved a tombstone on the Distin family grave. At the top of the tombstone it is inscribed "EX ILLUSTRI ET PER ANTIQUA STIRPE PROGNATA".
Tombstones in Winchfield cemetery, Hampshire		Winchfield, Hampshire	Durst received many commissions to carve tombstones including the Bennett headstone in Winchfield cemetery carved in 1948.
Walters headstone in		Kensal Rise Roman Catholic Cemetery	
Tombstone of Ellen Cobbold		Stopham Churchyard in Sussex	
Headstone of Helene Pfister		Norwood Greek Cemetery	
Tombstone for William Beech Masefield		Stopham Churchyard	Portland stone tombstone was made for Masefield who was the Rector of Stopham.

==== Other sculpture ====
Work	Location	Notes and References
Acrobats	Tate Britain	The carving, made of walnut, was shown at Leicester Galleries Exhibition in 1930.
African fruit-seller	Bradford 1 Gallery in Centenary Square, Bradford.	The stone sculpture was shown at Leicester Galleries Exhibition in 1930.
Archer	Unknown	A cedarwood carving.
Carvings for RMS Queen Mary	Longbeach, California.	Durst carved "Struggle", "Cat" and "Hind and Young", all three in stone, and "Horse" carved from Sienna marble.
Creation (tondo)	Unknown	The stone sculpture was shown at Leicester Galleries in 1930.
Dancer	Unknown	Wood carving. Exhibited at British Handicrafts by the Arts and Crafts Society and the Red Rose Guild, 1940.
Diana	Unknown	Torso carved in oak and shown Leicester Galleries Exhibition in 1930.
Dog	Unknown	Sienna marble carving. Exhibited at British Handicrafts by the Arts and Crafts Society and the Red Rose Guild, 1940.
Dog with bone	Unknown	Carving in sandstone
Eve and Cain	Unknown	Stone sculpture shown at Leicester Galleries Exhibition in 1930.
Feline	Tate Britain	Work in Sienna marble shown at Leicester Galleries in 1930. Held by Tate Britain and presented to the Tate by the executors of Mrs. Herbert Gibson in 1932. Mrs Gibson had purchased the piece from Leicester Galleries having seen it at their 1930 Exhibition.
Female figure	Unknown	Stone sculpture shown at Leicester Galleries Exhibition in 1930.
Female figure	Unknown	Sculpture shown in 1930 at Leicester Galleries.
Girl Binding Her Hair	Unknown	Wood carving shown at The Royal Glasgow Institute of the Fine Arts Eighty-Second Annual Exhibition, 1943.
Girl binding her hair	Tate Britain	The Derbyshire fossil stone sculpture standing on a black marble base was shown in 1930 at Leicester Galleries Exhibition. This work is held by Tate Britain, presented to them in 1965 by the Trustees of the Chantrey Bequest.
Goat	Unknown	Stone sculpture shown at Memorial Exhibition of Sculpture by the late Henry Poole, RA at the Leicester Galleries.
Head of girl	Unknown	Work in marble. Exhibited at The Exhibition of The Royal Scottish Academy of Painting, Sculpture and Architecture, The One-Hundred-and-Third, 1929.
Horse	Installed on R.M.S."Queen Mary".	Stone sculpture.
Horse	Unknown	Carving in rouge sanguine. Exhibited at The Exhibition of The Royal Scottish Academy of Painting, Sculpture and Architecture, The One-Hundred-and-Third, 1929.
Household God	Unknown	Carving in birchwood shown at Leicester Galleries in 1930.
Job	Unknown	The stone sculpture was shown at Leicester Galleries Exhibition in 1930.
Man and Lion	Unknown	The sculpture was shown in 1930 at Leicester Galleries.
Maritime Museum at Greenwich	Greenwich, Outer London	Durst carried out carvings from oak of the head of a sailor and a marine. It was acquired by the War Artists' Committee in 1944.
Mask	Unknown	Carving in teak shown at Leicester Galleries in 1930.
Mask	Unknown	Stone carving exhibited at Leicester Galleries in 1930.
Oak Carving	Unknown	Carving made from the "Headingly Shire Oak". Durst was apparently sent a piece of the tree for carving.
Pieta	Manchester Art Gallery	Marble work shown at Leicester Galleries in 1930. Held in the collections of the Manchester Art Gallery, though not currently on display.
Prehistoric Man	Unknown	The ivory carving was shown at Leicester Galleries in 1930.
Sea Lions	Docklands, Outer London	Durst carved a fountain sculpture featuring sea lions. This was commissioned in 1960 by the London County Council for an old peoples home in Greenlaw Street in the Docklands area.
Seated Figure	Unknown	Work in Greek marble shown at Leicester Galleries in 1930.
Seated Torso	Unknown	The stone sculpture was shown at 1930 Exhibition at Leicester Galleries.
Sleeping faun	Unknown	Marble carving. Exhibited at The Exhibition of The Royal Scottish Academy of Painting, Sculpture and Architecture, The One-Hundred-and-Third, 1929.
Sleeping woman	Unknown	Stone sculpture. Shown at Leicester Galleries in 1930.
Standing figure	Unknown	Stone sculpture. Exhibited at The Exhibition of The Royal Scottish Academy of Painting, Sculpture and Architecture, The One-Hundred-and-Third, 1929.
Tree spirit	Unknown	Carving in mahogany shown at Leicester Galleries Exhibition of 1930.
Tumbler (female)	Unknown	Carving in jarrah (eucalyptus).
Tumbler (male)	Unknown	The carving in jarrah (eucalyptus) was shown at Leicester Galleries in 1930.
Venus and Cupid	Unknown	Stone sculpture.
Woman	Unknown	Sculpture in African grey stone. Exhibited at The Exhibition of The Royal Scottish Academy of Painting, Sculpture and Architecture, The One-Hundred-and-Third, 1929.

=== Gallery of images ===
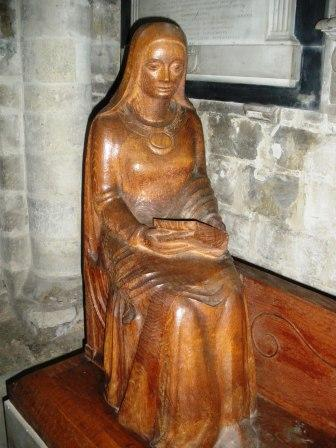
Close up of the Virgin Mary, "The Annunciation", in Winchester Cathedral

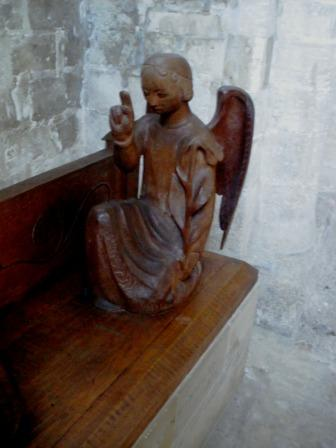
Gabriel in Winchester Cathedral

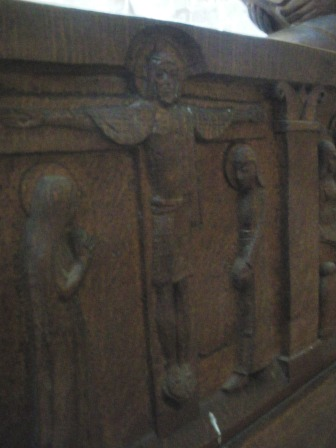
One of the reliefs to the rear of Alan Durst's "The Annunciation"- Jesus on the Cross

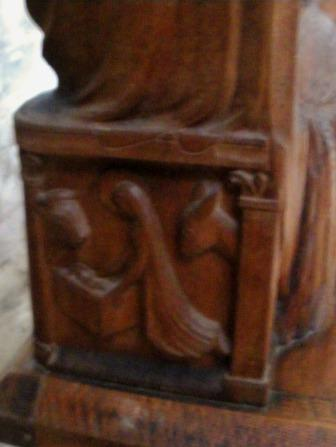
Relief on side of "The Annunciation"- Mary kneels before crib

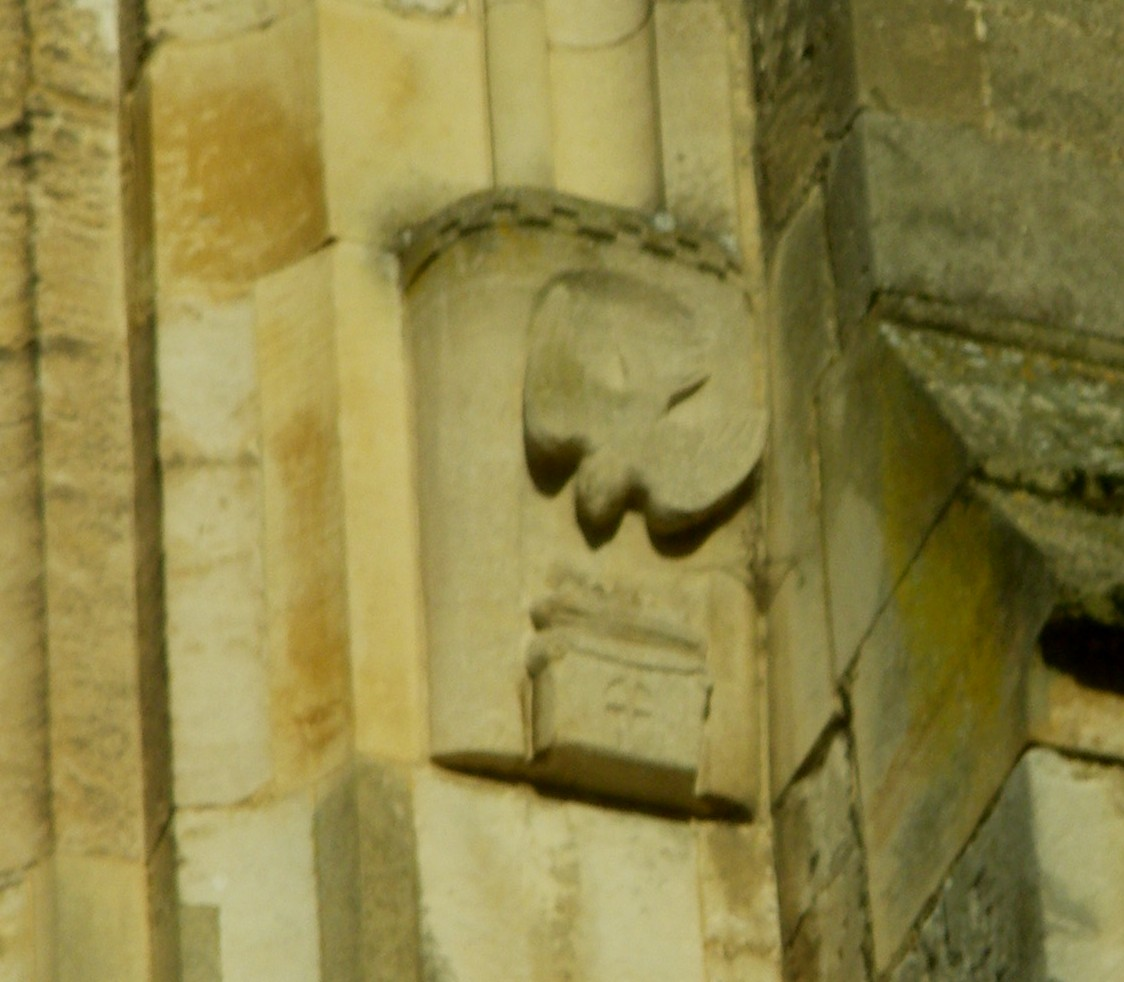
Another bird carving- A swallow swoops over its nest.

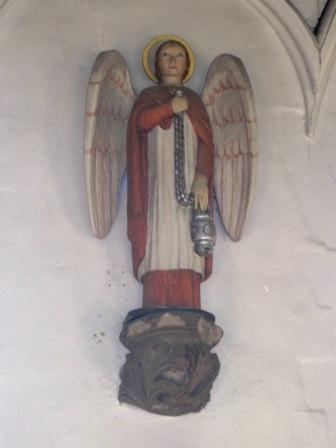
Angel with censer in St Alphege church.

== See also ==
- Holy Cross Church, Woodchurch
