= Listed buildings in Woodchurch, Merseyside =

Woodchurch is a suburb of Birkenhead, Wirral, Merseyside, England. It contains six buildings that are recorded in the National Heritage List for England as designated listed buildings. Of these, one is listed at Grade II*, the middle of the three grades, and the others are at Grade II, the lowest grade. The area was rural until the 1940s, since when there has been planned residential development. The major features in the area are a modern hospital, and Arrowe Hall with its surrounding grounds forming Arrowe Park. The hall is listed, as are its lodge and entrance. The other listed buildings are a medieval church, a modern church and a rectory.

== Key ==
Grade	Criteria
II*	Particularly important buildings of more than special interest
II	Buildings of national importance and special interest

== Buildings ==
Name and location	Photograph	Date	Notes	Grade
Holy Cross Church; 53.37350°N 3.09001°W		12th century	The oldest fabric is in the nave, dating from the 12th century, but most of the church was built in the 14th, 16th and 20th centuries. It is in stone with roofs of Westmorland and Welsh slate and copper. The church consists of a nave, aisles, a south porch, a chancel, and a west tower. The tower has large angle buttresses, a southeast stair turret, and an embattled parapet.	II*
Arrowe Hall; 53.36676°N 3.09402°W		1835	Originally a country house, enlarged in 1844, later used as a hospital, and subsequently converted into flats. It is ashlar-faced with a Welsh slate roof, and is in Neo-Tudor style. The building is in two storeys and has an entrance front of five bays with three gables and an oriel window. The south front is longer and includes more gables, two canted bay windows, and mullioned and transomed windows. Behind these fronts is a tower with an embattled parapet.	II
Gateway and walls, Arrowe Hall; 53.36884°N 3.08914°W		c. 1835	The gate piers and flanking walls are in sandstone, and the gates in cast iron. There are two pairs of octagonal piers with moulded caps, and between them are a carriage gate and two pedestrian gates with arrow-heads.	II
Lodge, Arrowe Park; 53.36890°N 3.08925°W		1856	The stone lodge has a Welsh slate roof, an L-shaped plan, and is in two storeys, the upper storey being jettied. The gabled porch is in the angle, and has scalloped bargeboards and a pendant finial. The wings are also gabled, and each contains a canted bay window with a mullioned window above.	II
Rectory; 53.37286°N 3.09022°W		1861–62	A brick house with stone dressings and a Welsh slate roof in Gothic style. It has two storeys with a central gabled timber porch. To the left are paired mullion windows with an oriel window above. To the right is a canted bay window over which is a gabled dormer. In 1961 the house was partly demolished and much of the internal decoration was destroyed.	II
St Michael and All Angels' Church; 53.37061°N 3.07337°W		1964–65	A Roman Catholic church by Richard O'Mahony. It is built with reinforced concrete walls and has a steel-framed pyramidal roof, which is clad internally with aluminium. The church has a T-shaped plan, with a narthex, a nave and transepts facing the central altar, and a chapel behind the altar. In the roof are louvres lighting the interior, and in the apex of the roof is a cross-shaped pierced opening.	II
