= Woodchurch High School =

Location
- Carr Bridge Road; Woodchurch, Wirral, CH49 7NG; England
- Coordinates: 53.378°N 3.081°W

Information
- Type: Academy
- Religious affiliation: Church of England
- Specialist: Engineering College & Training School
- Department for Education URN: 138853 Tables
- Ofsted: Reports
- Headteacher: Martyn Canham
- Gender: Coeducational
- Age: 11 to 16
- Enrolment: 1419 (2015)
- Website: http://www.woodchurchhigh.com

Woodchurch High School is a non-selective co-educational secondary school with academy status for people aged 11 to 16. It is located at Woodchurch, on the Wirral Peninsula, England. The school holds Specialist Engineering College status, and has facilities for students with physical and learning disabilities.

== Facilities ==
The main school building has a central hub with subject specific wings projecting out. Facilities include 4 Physics labs, 4 Chemistry labs, 3 Biology labs, 2 Science prep rooms, 2 Food Technology rooms, ICT, Art, Textiles, Maths, P.E, MFL, English and a recording studio. The building was designed by Building Design Partnership and the main contractor was KIER NorthWest. It is a functional and striking modern building that contrasts blocks of red and blue or black. The brickwork features modulation and effects including curved walls. Woodchurch High School Sports Complex has a number of facilities including Health and Fitness Suites, Sports Halls, Fitness Studios and Synthetic Turf Pitches.

== History ==
Woodchurch High School was created in 1970 after the merger of Woodchurch Secondary School for Boys and Woodchurch Secondary School for Girls.

In 1983 Woodchurch was expanded into an 11 to 18 mixed comprehensive after Birkenhead stopped using middle schools. The school underwent extensive building development to accommodate the additional pupils.

In 1988 the school became an 11 to 16 mixed comprehensive after the opening of Birkenhead Sixth Form College.

The school became a Specialist Engineering College in September 2002 as part of the Specialist Schools Programme in England.

In 2003 the schools headteacher Beryl Holt (1993 -2008) was appointed an OBE for services to education.

In 2004 it was announced that Woodchurch would be getting a new £2.2 million sports complex. The complex opened in 2005 for local schools and the general public. The Woodchurch Sports Barn was demolished at the same time.

As part of the British government's 'Building Schools for the Future' programme, plans for a new £23 million environmentally state-of-the-art school building were announced in November 2006. The new facility was officially opened in September 2010.

In 2008 the school was the subject of the BBC Two television documentary Rocket Science in which physics teacher Andy Smith tried to get a group of eighteen Year 8 pupils interested in science by using alternative teaching methods. Smith had already taught at the school for ten years before when he was approached to participate in the programme. In addition to the lessons, pupils made field trips to copper mines in the United States and fireworks factories in China. For the series finale, the students designed, built and lit the fireworks for the closing ceremony of Liverpool's period as European Capital of Culture for 2008.

In May 2014 the School became a Church of England Academy after becoming a 'Type 2' (new) academy in 2012 and ‘A School with a Church of England Trust’ in 2009.

== Exam results ==
In the academic year 2017/2018 38% of pupils achieved a grade 5 or above in English and Maths GCSEs. By comparison the Local Education Authority average was 45.90% and the English average was 43.30%.

== Ofsted reports ==
Ofsted inspections of the school began in the 1990s. In 1994 the school was rated ‘very good’. In 1999 Woodchurch celebrated an 'outstanding' Osfted report. They were the first secondary school on the Wirral to achieve such a high standard report placing them in the top ten per cent of the country. The school maintained its 'outstanding' reports in 2005 and 2008. The school was rated 'good' in 2012 and 2016.
