= Holy Cross Church, Woodchurch =

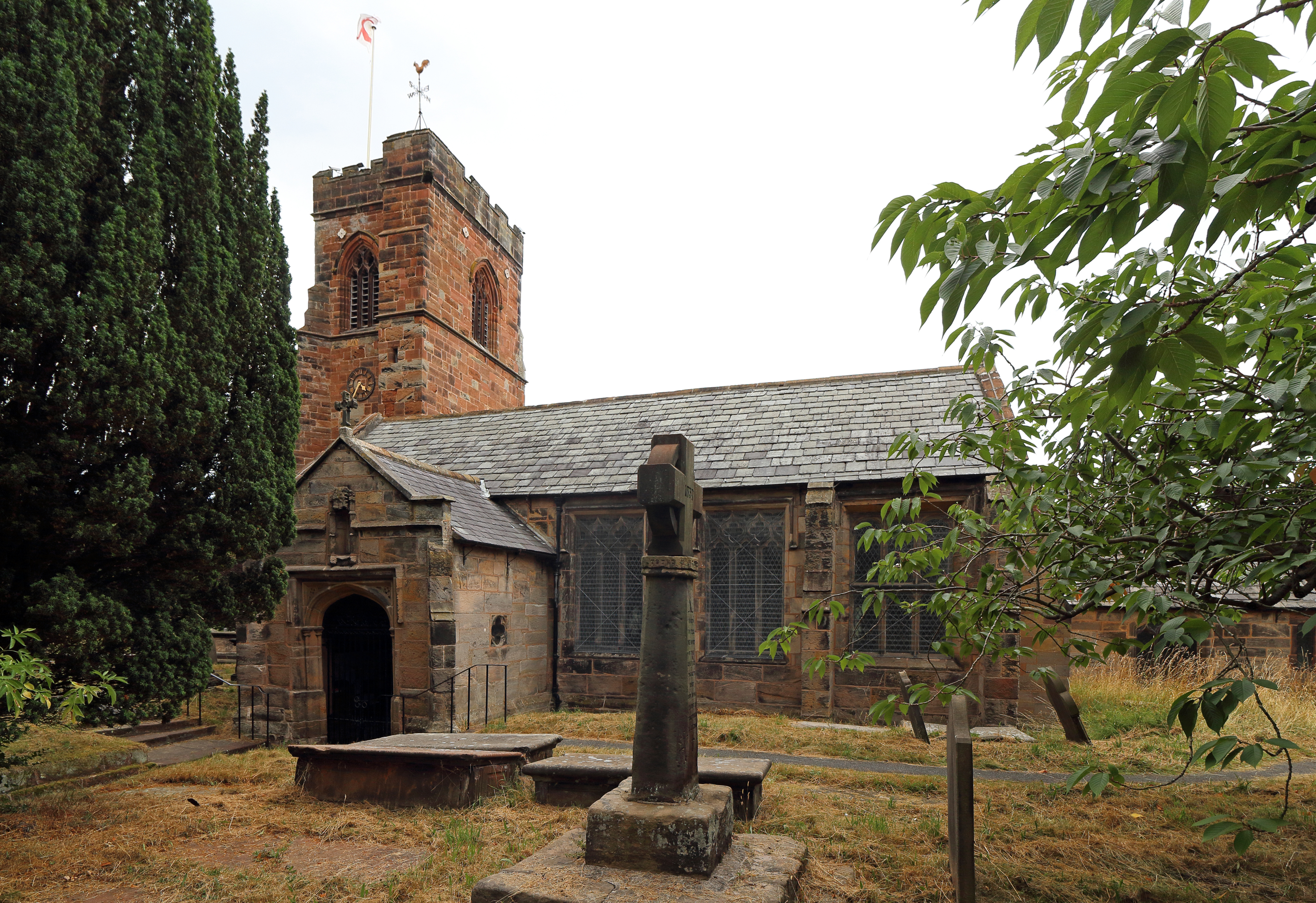
- Holy Cross Church, Woodchurch

- Location in Merseyside
- 53.3735°N 3.0900°W
- OS grid reference: SJ 276 869
- Location: Woodchurch, Birkenhead, Wirral, Merseyside
- Country: England
- Denomination: Anglican
- Churchmanship: Modern Anglo-Catholic
- Website: Holy Cross, Woodchurch

History
- Status: Parish church

Architecture
- Functional status: Active
- Heritage designation: Grade II*
- Designated: 29 July 1950
- Architect: Hubert Worthington
- Architectural type: Church
- Style: Gothic, Gothic Revival
- Completed: 1965

Specifications
- Materials: Stone, slate roofs with some copper covering

Administration
- Province: York
- Diocese: Chester
- Archdeaconry: Chester
- Deanery: Birkenhead
- Parish: Woodchurch

Clergy
- Rector: Revd. Anne Davis

Holy Cross Church is in Woodchurch, an area of Birkenhead, Wirral, Merseyside, England. It is an active Anglican parish church in the diocese of Chester, the archdeaconry of Chester and the deanery of Birkenhead. The church is recorded in the National Heritage List for England as a designated Grade II* listed building.

== History ==
The fabric of the nave originates from the 12th century. However, the circular style graveyard suggests a pre-Norman date, possible Saxon or Romano-British. This early date is supported by the discovery of a portion of a 'Class D' Anglo-Saxon wheel cross at the grounds of the church in the late 19th or early 20th century and placed within the wall of the chancel within the church. The cross probably stood intact in the graveyard until the 17th century when many such crosses were destroyed by the Puritans In the 14th century the south aisle, chancel and tower were added. The south aisle was rebuilt in the 16th century and a south porch was added. Heavy diagonal buttresses were added to the tower in 1675. The vestry was built in 1766. The north aisle by Hubert Worthington was added in 1964–65.

== Architecture ==
=== Exterior ===
The church is built in stone. The roofs are of slate with copper covering the latest additions to the church. Its plan consists of a nave with north and south aisles, a chancel, vestry and south porch. The tower is in two stages, the lower stage being very high. At the northwest and southwest corners of the tower are massive stepped buttresses. To its southeast is a square stair turret. Its top is embattled. In the porch is a shallow piscina and grooves said to be caused by the sharpening of arrows. The windows in the porch contain some medieval stained glass. The north wall of the nave is Norman and the chancel inclines to the north. Built into the wall of the chancel is a Saxon wheel cross. The chancel also contains old stained glass.

=== Interior ===
On the north wall of the chancel are three 17th-century wooden epitaph panels containing the coats of arms of local people painted by Randle Holme. The wooden carved bench ends in the chancel date from the 15th century. At the back of the church is a charity board dated 1741. On the west wall are old bread shelves dated 1641 and 1670. On the west wall of the south aisle are the remnants of a Jesse window by Kempe which was damaged by a bomb in 1941 and restored in 1945. The octagonal font dates from the late 15th century and includes carvings of angels and scenes from the Passion. The floor contains some medieval encaustic tiles. The rood screen, designed by Bernard A. Miller and carved by Alan Durst, was added in 1934. The south window of the chancel is by Kempe, and is dated 1875. A processional cross dated 1937 was carved in ivory by Alan Durst. In the chancel is a monument by W. Spence to Margaret Hughes who died in 1802. The parish registers begin in 1571. There is a ring of eight bells which were cast in 1971 by the Whitechapel Bell Foundry. It is said to be one of the lightest rings in Britain.

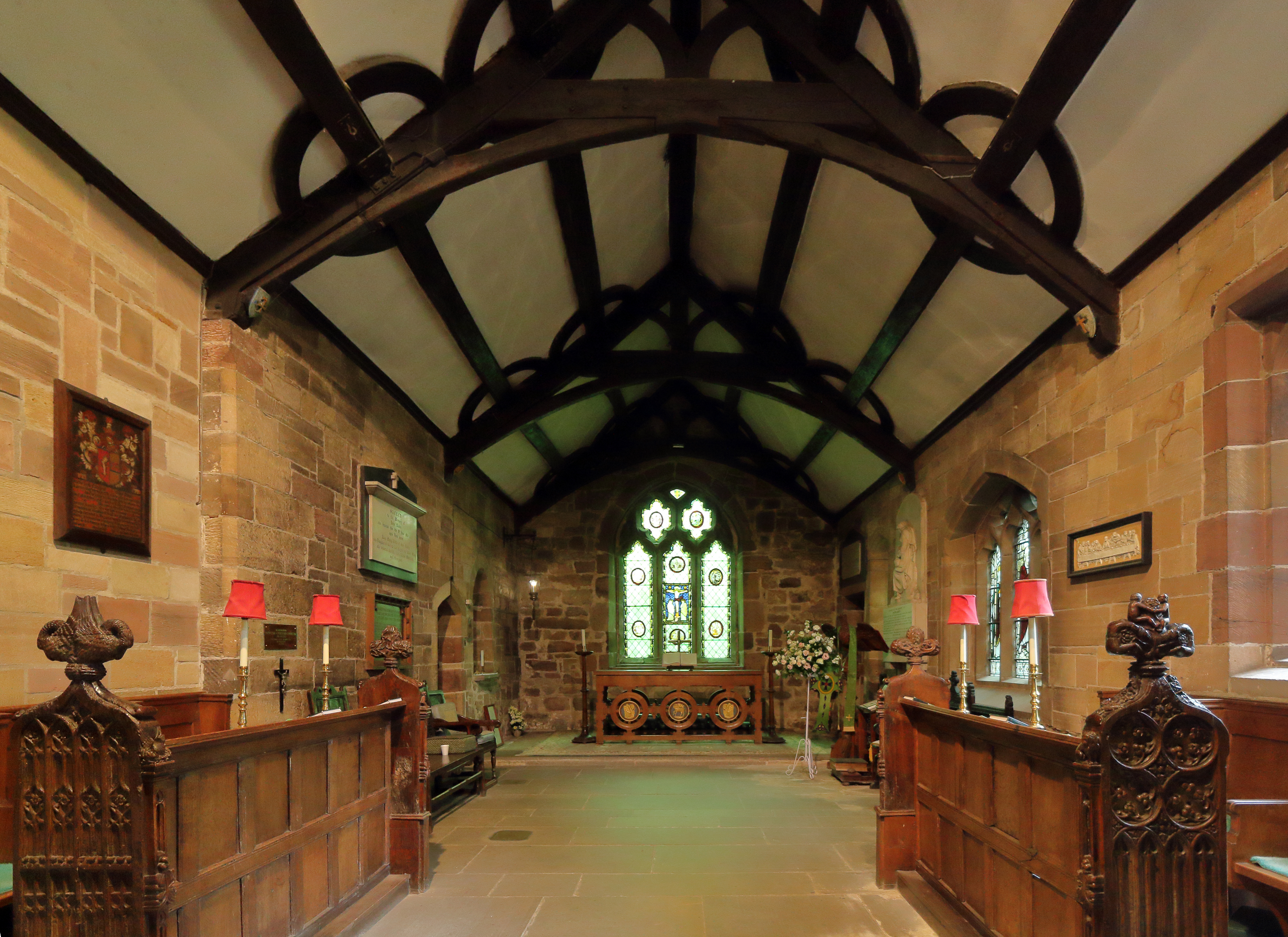
Chancel showing bench ends

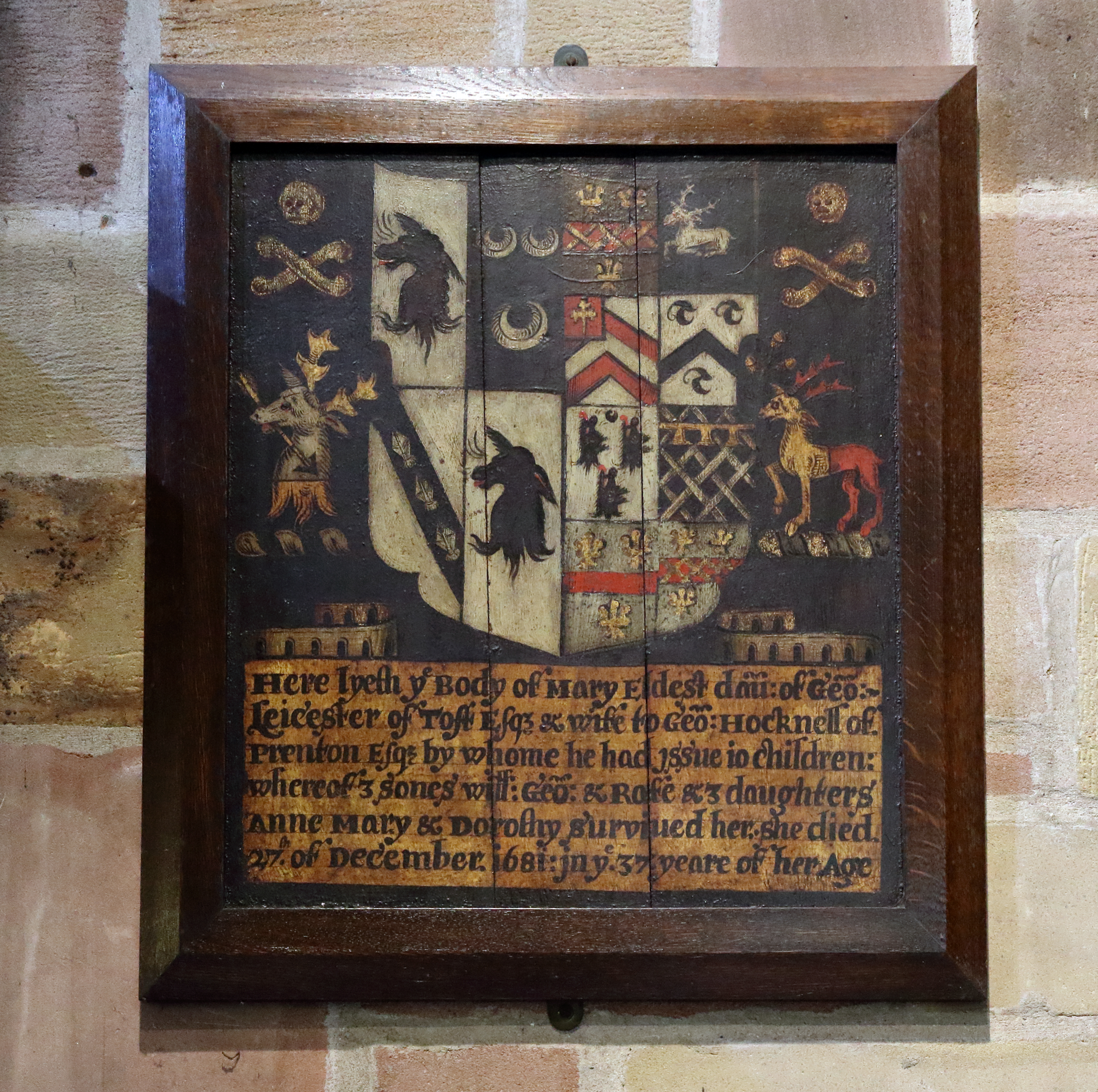
Hocknell epitaph panel

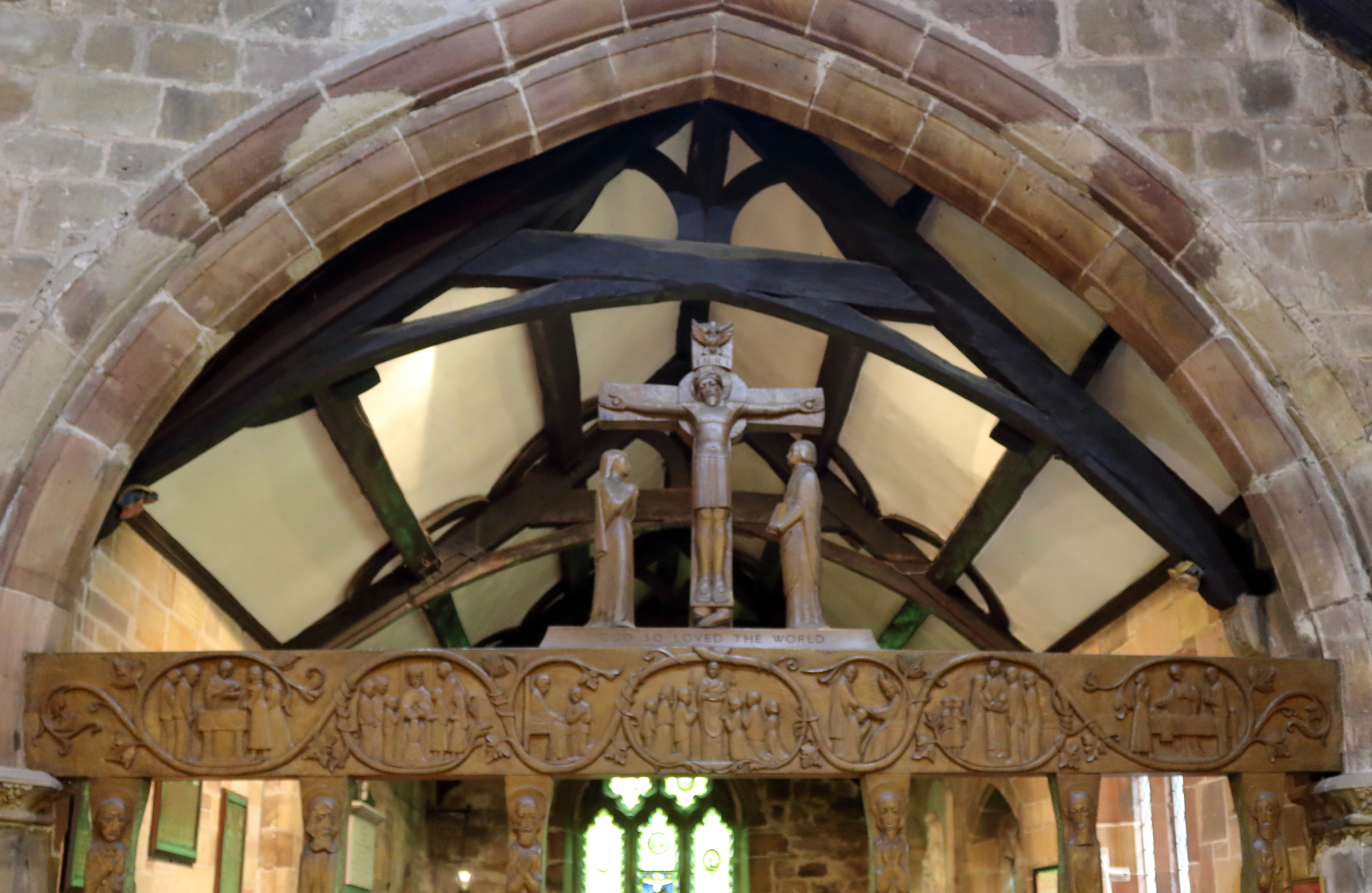
Alan Durst's rood screen

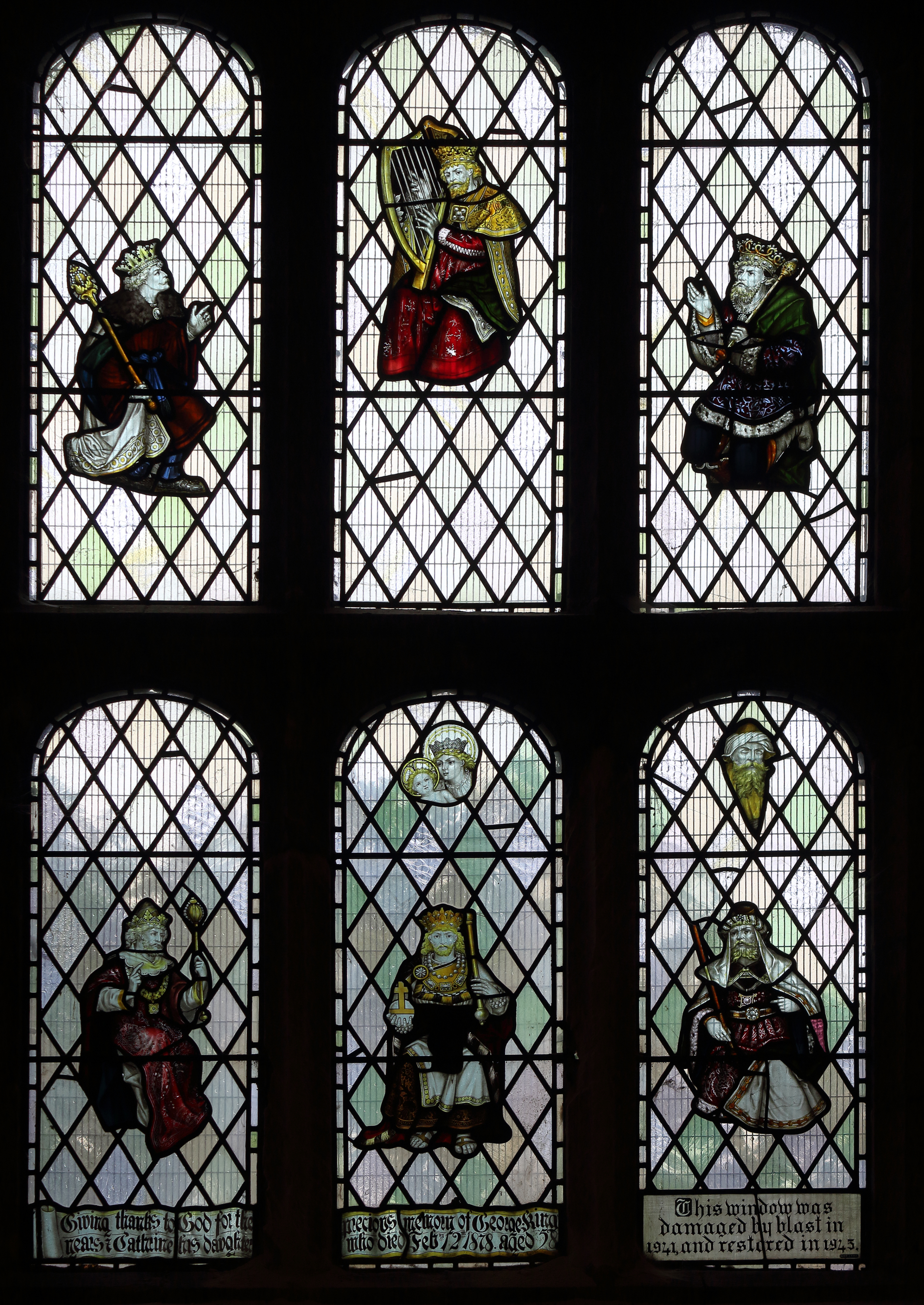
Kempe's reconstructed Jesse window

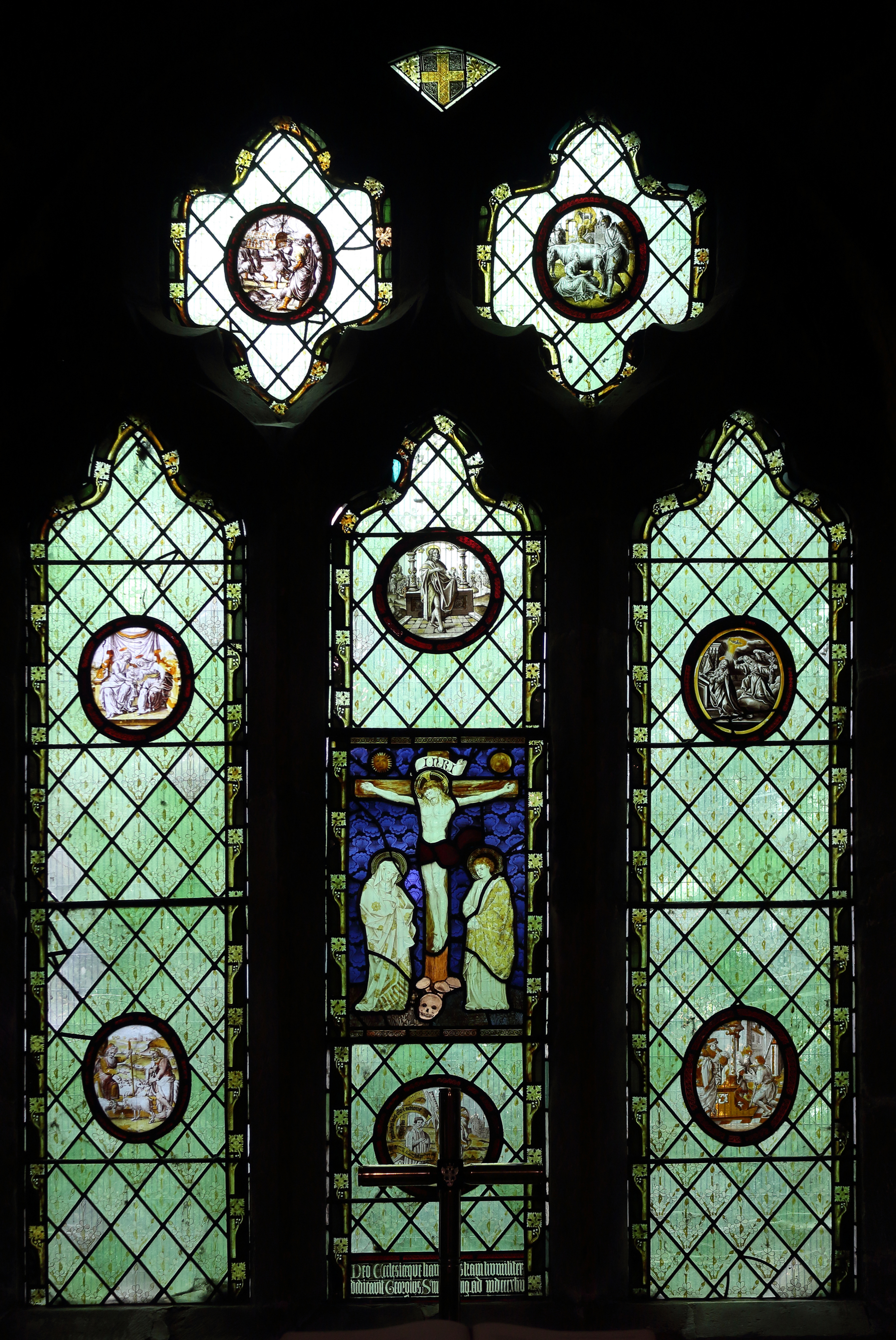
East window

== Organ Specification ==
The organ was built in 1938 by Rushworth and Dreaper and rebuilt in 1997 by the same firm. It is an electronic extension organ, with 2 manuals and a concave radiating pedal board. There are also confusingly 2 boxes, meaning that the entire instrument is boxed. Listed below are the list of stops, which on the instrument are tabbed, along with a list of where stops have been used again, and which box controls the stop. The number in brackets refers to the stop number below which from which it is borrowed.

Detailed stop specifications

Swell

Compass: Low C- C4 (61 keys)

1. Contra Salicional, 16', LH Box,(22)

2. Stopped Diapason, 8', RH Box, (13+24)

3. Salicional, 8', LH Box, (14+25)

4. Flute, 4', RH Box, (16+26)

5. Flautina, 2', RH Box

6. Larigot, 1 1/3', RH Box

7. Twenty Second, 1' LH Box

8. Contra Tromba, 16', RH Box (27)

9. Tromba, 8', RH Box (28)

10. Octave Tromba, 4', RH Box

Great

Compass: Low C- C4 (61 keys)

11. Bourdon, 16', RH Box (21)

12. Open Diapason, 8', LH Box (23)

13. Stopped Diapason, 8', RH Box (2+24)

14. Salicional, 8', LH Box (3+25)

15. Octave Diapason, 4', LH Box

16. Flute, 4', RH Box (4+26)

17. Dulcet, 4', LH Box

18. Nazard, 2 2/3', RH Box

19. Fifteenth, 2', LH Box

Pedal

Compass: Low C- C1 (30 keys)

20. Acoustic Bass, 32', RH Box

21. Sub Bass, 16', RH Box (11)

22. Salicional, 16', LH Box (1)

23. Octave, 8', LH Box (12)

24. Bass Flute, 8', RH Box (2+13)

25. Salicional, 8', LH Box (3+14)

26. Octave Flute, 4', RH Box (4+16)

27. Tromba, 16', RH Box (8)

28. Octave Tromba, 8', RH Box (9)

Accessories and couplers

Swell to Great

Swell to Pedal

Great to Peal

3 thumb pistons each to Great and Swell, giving double touch Pedal

3 toe Pedal pistons

3 toe Swell pistons

Reversible toe "Great to Pedal" piston

== See also ==
- Grade II* listed buildings in Merseyside
- Listed buildings in Woodchurch, Merseyside
