= The Acrobats (Doré) =

Painting by Gustave Doré

- Les Saltimbanques (French)
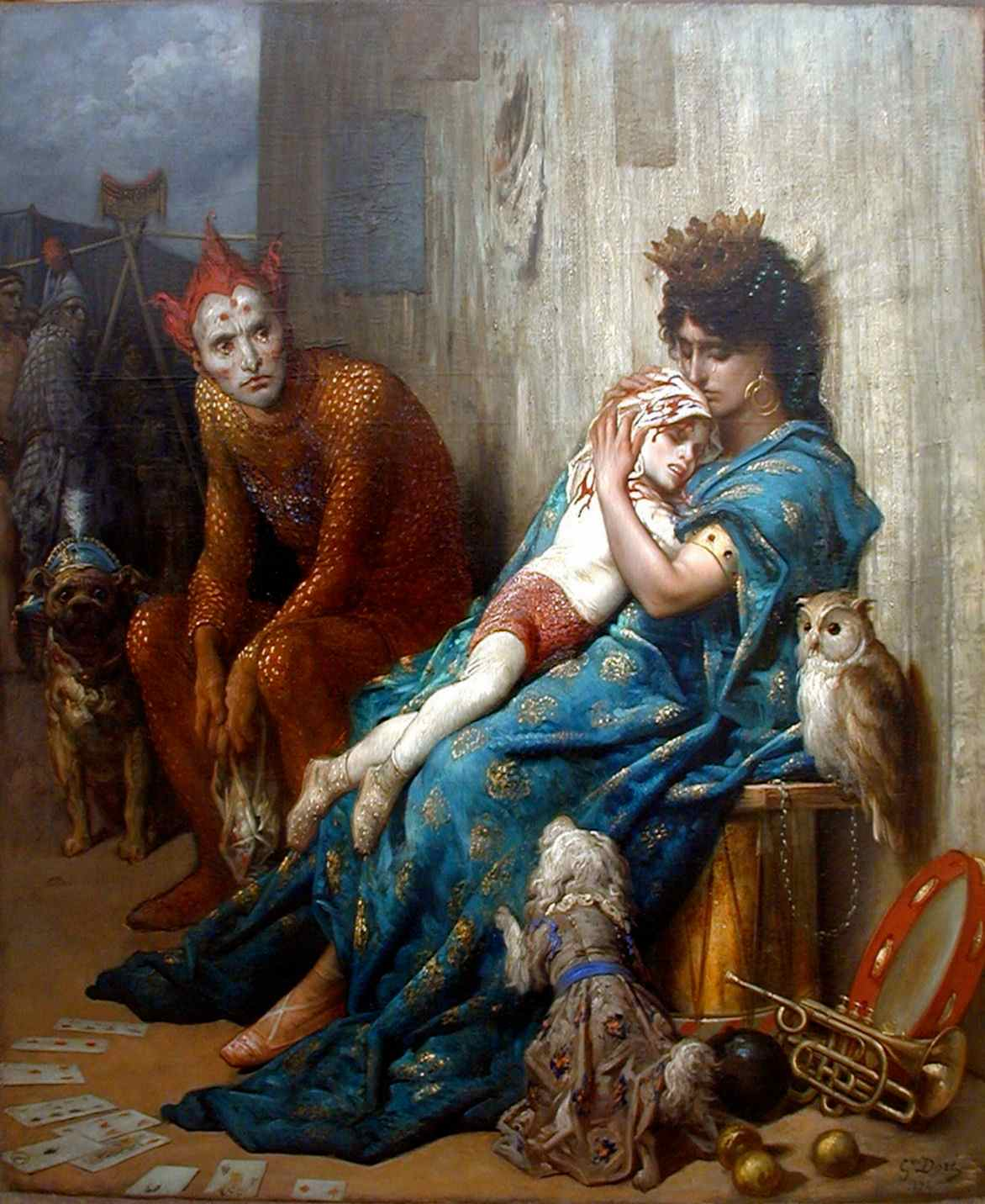
- Artist: Gustave Doré
- Year: 1874
- Medium: Oil on canvas
- Dimensions: 224 cm × 184 cm (88 in × 72 in)
- Location: Roger-Quilliot Art Museum; Clermont-Ferrand

The Acrobats (French: Les Saltimbanques), (or The Wounded Child) is an oil-on-canvas painting created in 1874 by the French artist Gustave Doré. It represents a family of acrobats, who work in a circus, struck by a tragedy: their son, mortally wounded in the head, lies in the arms of his mother after an accident during a tightrope walking performance.

== Description ==
The light in the painting is centered on the child and his mother; the background of the painting, where onlookers observe the scene, is much darker. The painting can be divided into two parts by drawing an imaginary diagonal going from the upper right corner to the lower left corner. The position of the child follows this line, and it is reinforced by the pallor of his white jerkin (the folds of the garment show that it is not his skin).

The bright colors of the circus clothing contrast with the whiteness of the injured child's clothing. The child and the mother are characters in a central position, and therefore are seen in full light. The mother is dressed in a Bohemian fashion with long, blue fabric, a golden crown, and ballet shoes. She holds her dying son in her arms, against her body. Her eyes are closed, and a tear runs down her face as she kisses him. She is seated on a drum and some musical instruments are seen at the right.

According to Doré, the child is dying from his injuries. The blood from the child's head wound is soaking into a white cloth his mother is pressing to it.

On the left, the seated and bent father watches the scene. His posture and affect show deep sadness with tears in his eyes. He is still dressed in his all-red clown costume complete with stage makeup and a red hat. He is holding circus slippers.

In the dark background, to the left of the father on the edge of the frame, a crowd of acrobats and onlookers observe the group of the mother and father with the dying son.

Three animals are also shown near the group: two dogs and an owl. Next to the father, there is a bulldog, who is sitting next to him on his right, and who is also looking sadly to the child. Near the mother is a bichon. He is covered with a garment whose patterns are similar to those of his owner's dress, but with the blue, gold and silver colors reversed, in negative. The animal puts its left front paw on her and also looks towards the child. The two dogs seem to sympathize with the suffering of their masters and to share their emotion.

The only animal not observing the scene is the owl, who is placed and chained on the edge of the drum where the woman is seated. The owl, with his eyes wide open, gives the impression of looking in the direction of the viewers of the painting.

== Symbolism ==
The position of the father separated from the mother and child follows a motif of Christian paintings of the nativity scene which often depict Joseph as separate from the Virgin Mary and the infant Jesus. The mother is dressed in blue, which is commonly associated with the Virgin Mary. In an interview, Doré commented on the Christian symbolism of the painting, saying "...[The Acrobats] would have made a good contrast with ‘The Christian Martyrs,’ being in so entirely different a style."

== Provenance ==
The painting was purchased by the city of Clermont-Ferrand in 1937. It is now in the city's Roger-Quilliot Art Museum on the floor reserved for 19th-century French art. In 2011, the painting was elected as the museum's favorite by its visitors.
