= Alan Durst =

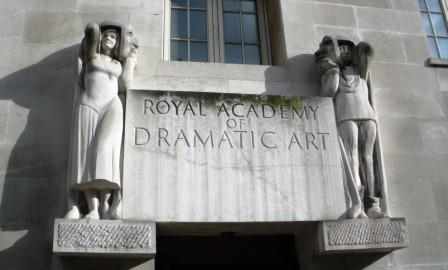
- Durst's sculpture above the entrance to the Royal Academy of Dramatic Art
- Born: 27 June 1883; Alverstoke, Hampshire, England
- Died: 1970 (aged 86–87); London, England
- Education: London County Council (LCC) Central School of Arts and Crafts
- Known for: Sculpture

Alan Lydiat Durst ARA (1883–1970) was a British sculptor and wood carver and member of the London Group of artists. Three of Durst's works are held in the permanent collection of Tate Gallery.

== Personal life ==
Alan Durst was born at the rectory in Alverstoke, Hampshire, England on 27 June 1883. He was the son of William Durst who was the Rector of Alverstoke. He married Elizabeth Clare Amy Barlow on 11 December 1918. Durst died on 22 December 1970 and his funeral took place on Tuesday 29 December 1970 at Golders Green Crematorium. (Note: His obituary in "The Times" of 30 November 1970 was written by George Pace and reads- Those who were privileged to work with Alan Durst were able to fully appreciate his integrity and his indomitable spirit; to enjoy with him his love of fine buildings and his pride in being senior Associate of the Royal Academy and to be enfolded in his gentle goodness and kind courtesy. In 1964 when he had finished carving seven statues for the upper part of Peterborough Cathedral he told me that in his early days when he wanted to learn “direct carving” he found that the art schools of the day could only teach him modelling; for it was still the fashion for sculptors to make models which were then translated into stone or marble by technicians using pointers and masons' skills. After World War 1 the more realistic approach to sculpture enabled him to learn the techniques of direct carving and this equipped him to devote the rest of his life to spirited direct carving in stone, wood and ivory. From the summer of 1914 his life ambition was to complete a series of statues carved in the spirit he had extracted from Chartres. He achieved this ambition in 1962-64. The statues he carved are stored at Peterborough. Amongst Alan Durst's outstanding works must be numbered the oakscreen and rood at Woodchurch, Wirral, 1935 in collaboration with architect Bernard Miller and the font at Llandaff Cathedral 1952. The small and delightful label stops he carved for Winchester Cathedral depict the wild birds which he had loved to watch in his childhood spent in the close. The ivory Annunciation carved in 1948 he gave to Peterborough Cathedral in 1968 to be a memorial to his dearly loved wife, Clare. This delicate and original treatment of the subject is to be placed in a special setting in the cathedral's new Treasury”)

== Education ==
He was educated at Marlborough College and in Switzerland. In 1913 he enrolled at the London County Council (LCC) Central School of Arts and Crafts As part of his studies Durst visited Chartres in early 1914. He went in fact to study stained glass windows but in his private papers held at Tate Britain Archive he explained that he was so taken with the magnificence of the statuary of Chartres Cathedral that he determined to pursue sculpture as a career. As Durst puts it, seeing the Chartres statues “opened a door for me”.

== Military service ==
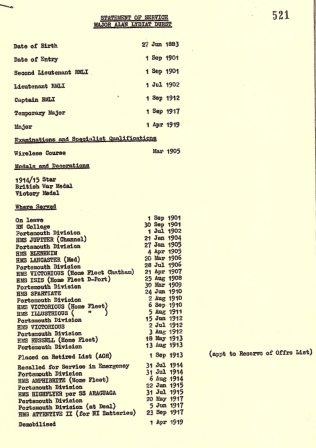
Part of Durst's Service Record.ADM/196/63

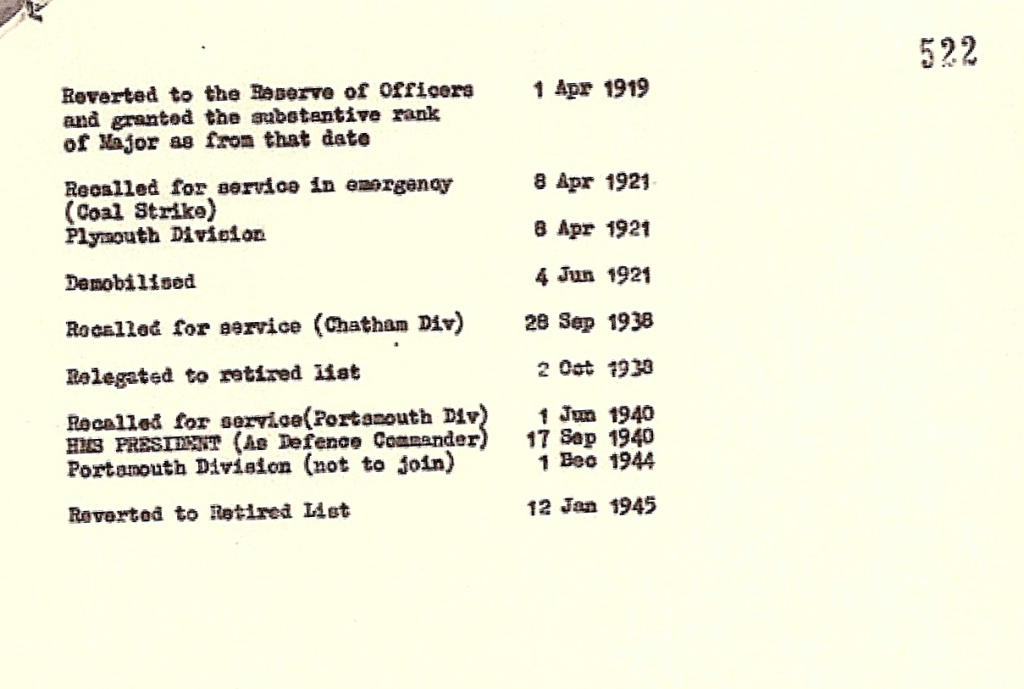
Part of Durst's Service Record.ADM/196/63

Durst served in the Royal Marine Light Infantry, first joining as a second lieutenant in 1901. Details of this service are shown in record ADM/196/63 held at The National Archive. He was promoted to lieutenant on 1 July 1902, and served until 1913 when he was placed on the "Retired List" and began his studies at the School of Art.

He returned to the Royal Marines in July 1914 and served from 1914 to 1919. In his private papers held at Tate Britain Archive Durst writes that he would often while away the time in his cabin when at sea by executing small carvings in ivory and in one of his photograph albums he features a Tea caddie with delicately carved ivory panels and adds the note "carved while at sea on active service-1918"

He was also recalled during the 1939-1945 conflict and in April 1921 for emergency service necessitated by the Coal Strike.

== Career ==
After leaving art school Durst became Curator of the George Frederic Watts Museum in Compton from 1919 to 1920. He left that museum to take up sculpture and wood carving on a full-time basis, and taught wood carving at the Royal College of Art from 1925 to 1940 and from 1945 to 1948. Durst had his first solo exhibition at the Leicester Galleries in London in 1930 and another in 1935. He was a regular exhibitor at the Royal Academy. We learn from Durst's Tate Britain Archive papers that when Durst returned to his studies after the 1914-1918 war he was very much drawn to the concept of "Direct Carving" as advocated by Jacob Epstein and Eric Gill. He also states that he was an admirer of Henri Gaudier-Brzeska the French sculptor killed in action in 1915.

George Pace, an English architect who worked with Dunst wrote of his philosophical approach towards sculpting:

In 1964 when he had finished carving seven statues for the upper part of Peterborough Cathedral he told me that in his early days when he wanted to learn “direct carving” he found that the art schools of the day could only teach him modelling; for it was still the fashion for sculptors to make models which were then translated into stone or marble by technicians using pointers and masons' skills. After World War 1 the more realistic approach to sculpture enabled him to learn the techniques of direct carving and this equipped him to devote the rest of his life to spirited direct carving in stone, wood and ivory. From the summer of 1914 his life ambition was to complete a series of statues carved in the spirit he had extracted from Chartres.

He was appointed a member of The British School at Rome in 1945 - Faculty of Sculpture.

== Gallery ==
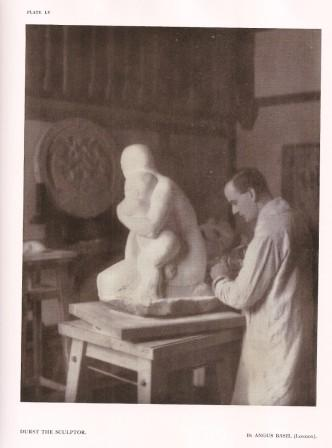
Alan Durst at work. Image shown courtesy Ashley Basil.

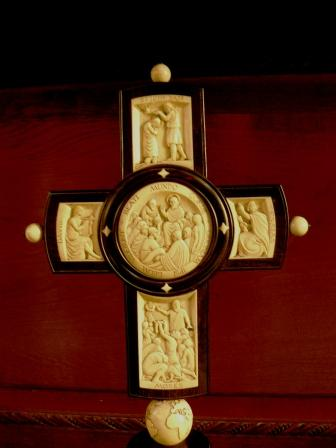
Close up of Middleton Altar Cross showing delicacy of Durst's carving

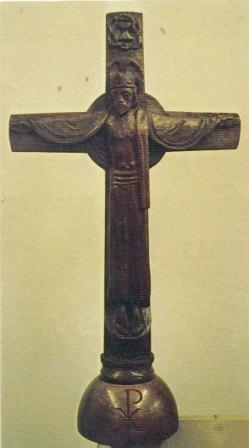
Altar Cross in St Peter's Church, Petersfield.Hampshire

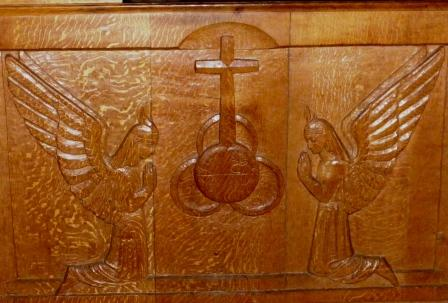
Carving on Clergy Stall in Northwood Church

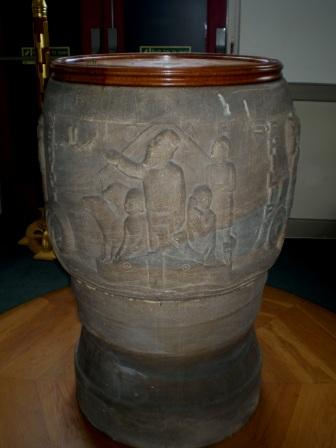
Font in St Christopher's Church Withington, Manchester

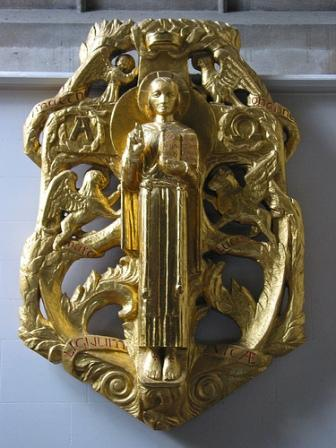
Durst work in St Mary the Great Church

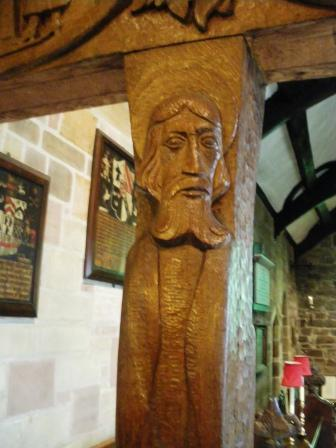
One of the uprights of the Woodchurch Rood Screen

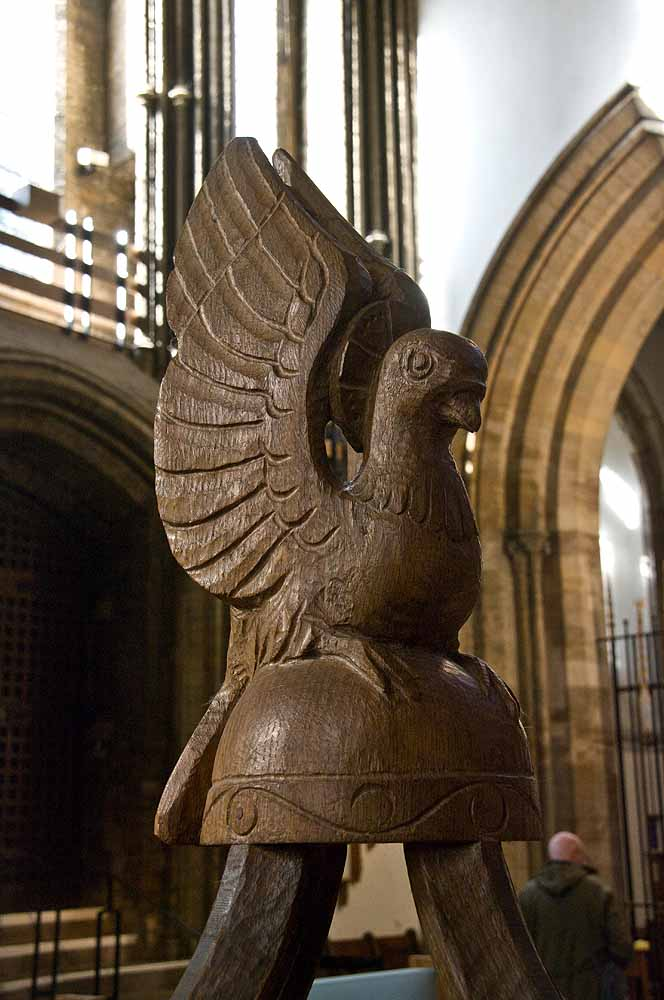
Llandaff Cathedral Dove

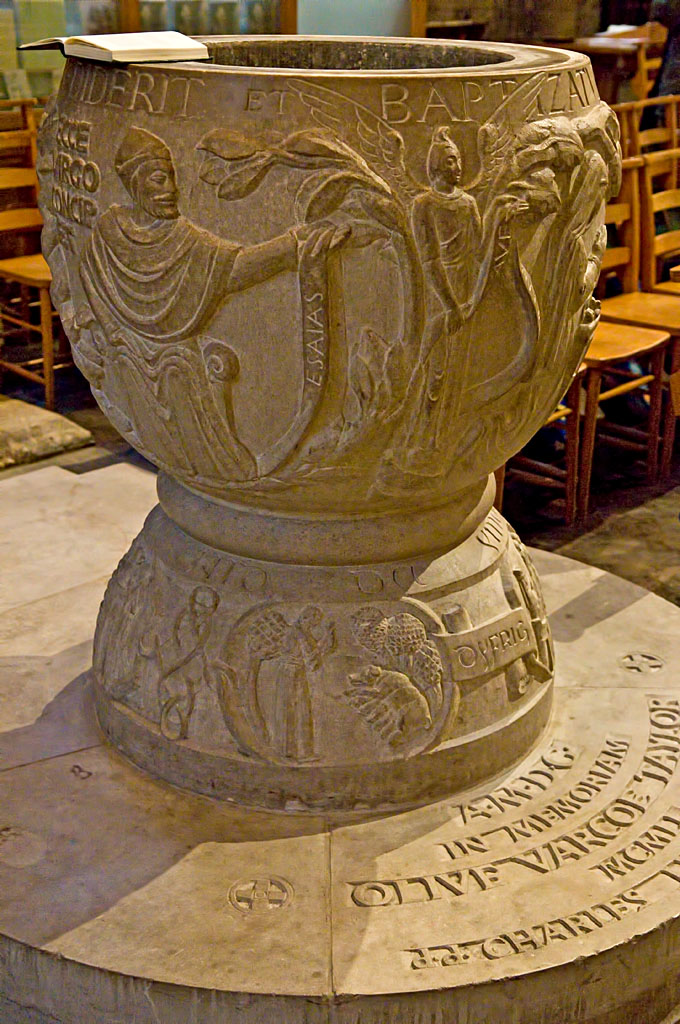
Llandaff Cathedral Font

== See also ==
- Holy Cross Church, Woodchurch
