= Woodchurch, Merseyside =

Coordinates: 53.375°N 3.084°W

Woodchurch
- Village
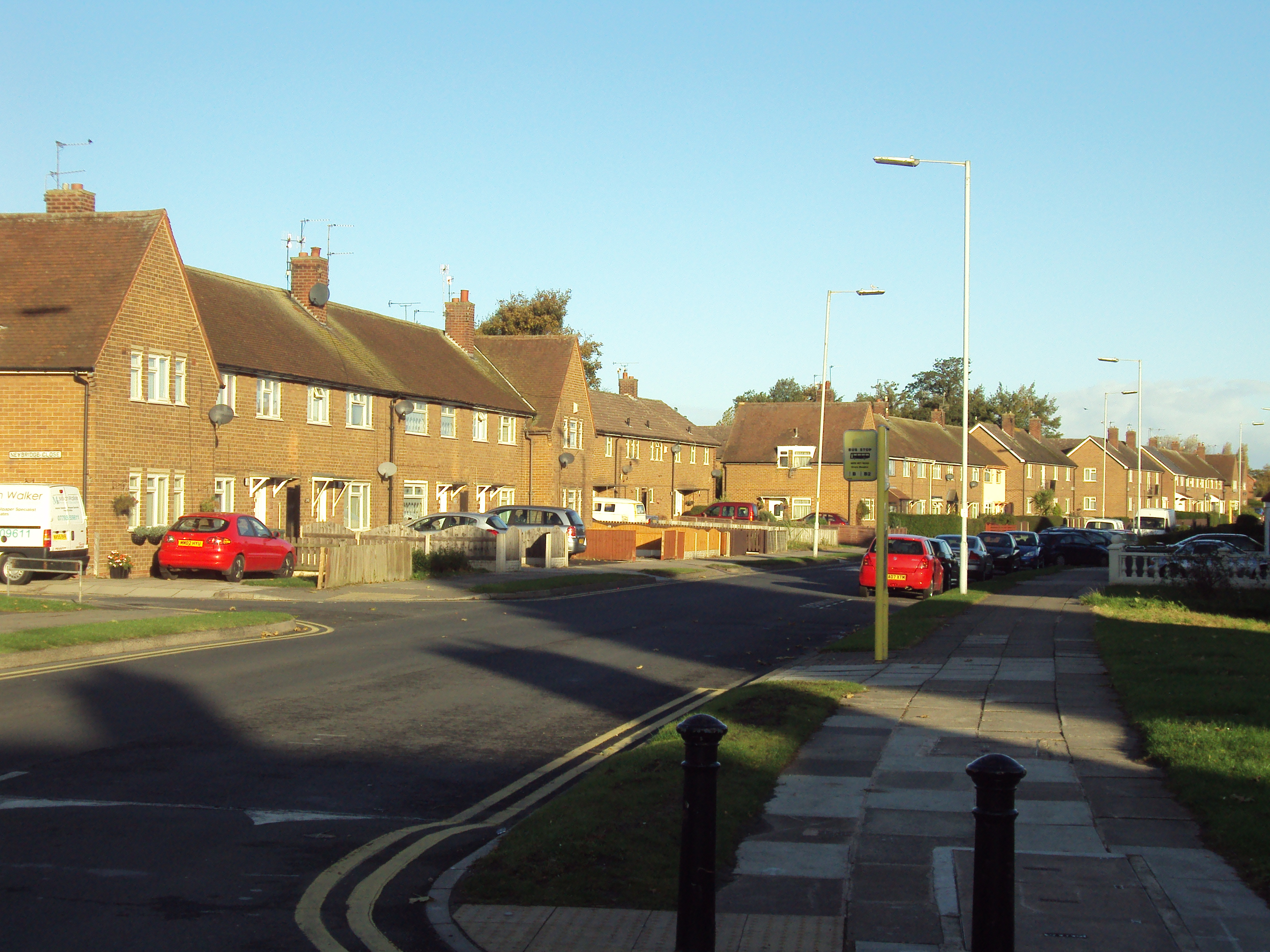
- Houses on New Hey Road

- Location within Merseyside
- Population: 8,400 (2001 Census)
- OS grid reference: SJ279870
  - London: 179 mi (288 km) SE
- Metropolitan borough: Wirral
- Metropolitan county: Merseyside
- Region: North West
- Country: England
- Sovereign state: United Kingdom
- Post town: WIRRAL
- Postcode district: CH49
- Dialling code: 0151
- ISO 3166 code: GB-WRL
- Police: Merseyside
- Fire: Merseyside
- Ambulance: North West
- UK Parliament: Wirral West

Woodchurch is a settlement on the Wirral Peninsula, in Merseyside, England. Administratively, Woodchurch is within the Metropolitan Borough of Wirral, its parliamentary constituency is Wirral West, and its local council ward is Upton. At the 2001 Census, it had a population of 8,400 (3,840 males, 4,560 females). Woodchurch is dominated by a large housing development, known as the Woodchurch Estate. The district is served by several schools and has the major Arrowe Park Hospital just outside its boundary, which was built on 15 acres (61,000 m^{2}) of the park itself and opened in 1982.

== History ==
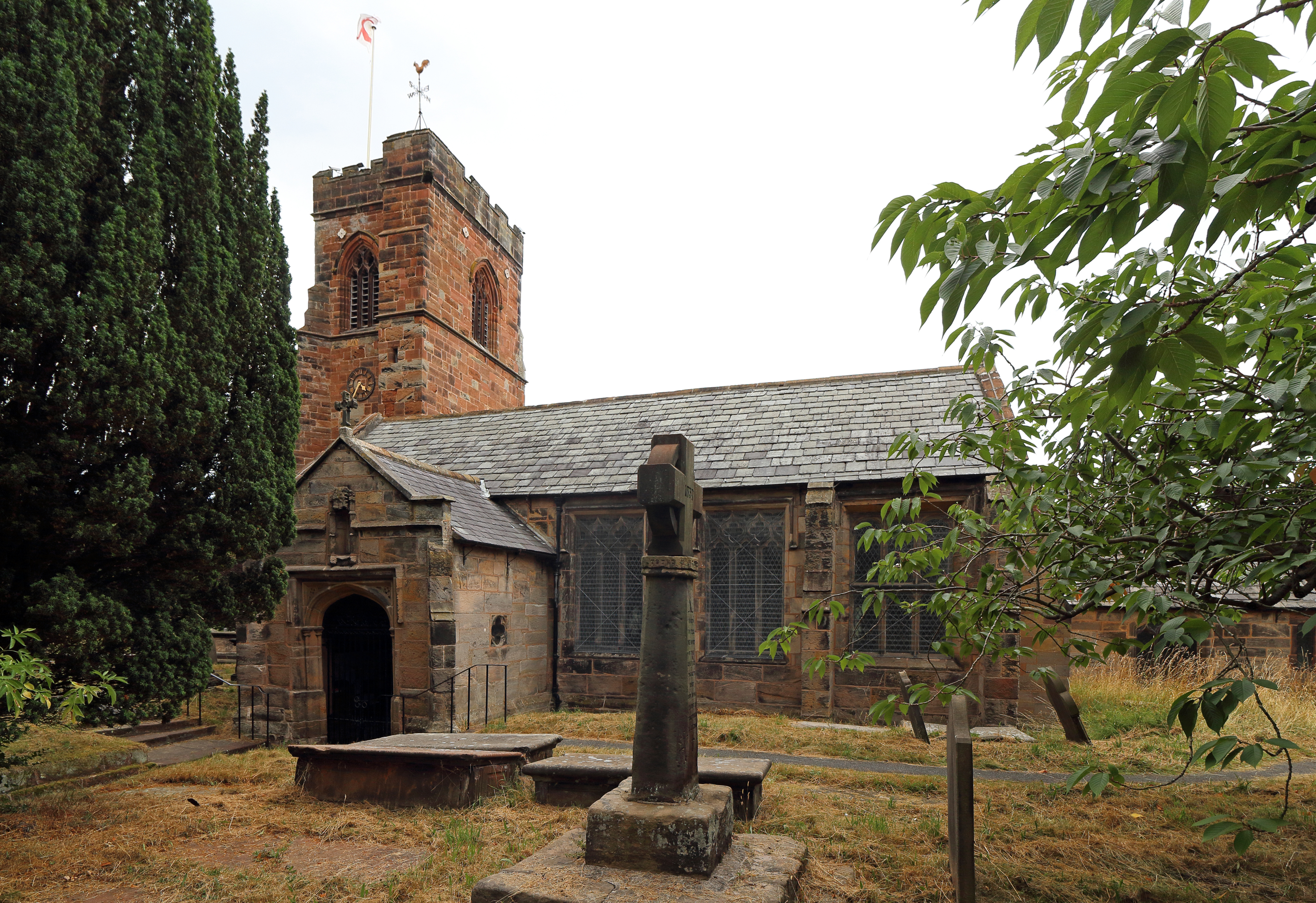
Holy Cross Church.

Woodchurch was originally a farming area and ancient village of the Wirral Hundred, known mainly for its parish church and the neighbouring Arrowe Park country estate. The first recorded owner of the land was an Anglo-Saxon chief called Aescwulf who claimed ownership of Woodchurch, Arrowe and Landican. Although not recorded in the Domesday Book, Woodchurch was recorded as Wude Church in 1093.

The population was 52 in 1801, 96 in 1851, 140 in 1901 and 113 in 1931.

=== 20th century ===
The area was purchased by Birkenhead Corporation in 1926, on 1 April 1933 the civil parish was abolished and merged with Birkenhead St Mary. Construction of a new housing estate complete with shops, schools, industry and leisure facilities began immediately after World War II. Of the old village, only the church and its adjoining school remain.

From 1968, the Champion Spark Plug Company operated an automotive components factory on Arrowe Brook Road, employing at one time over 1,000 people. It was closed in 2006 with production transferred to Italy.

From the 1950s to the 1980s, the CO-OP operated a clothing factory and industrial laundry on Woodchurch Road and its water-tower and chimney were local landmarks. This business had become a Leo's superstore by 1986, and is currently a branch of Asda.

== Geography ==
Woodchurch is in the northern part of the Wirral Peninsula, 5 km (3.1 mi) from the Irish Sea at Leasowe Lighthouse, a similar distance east-north-east of the Dee Estuary at Thurstaston and approximately 6 km (3.7 mi) west of the River Mersey at Woodside. The village of Woodchurch is situated on a lower prominence between Bidston Hill and Thurstaston Hill, with the centre of the village at an elevation of approximately 41 m (135 ft) above sea level.

The River Fender bounds Woodchurch to the east. The Fender joins the Birket, before discharging into West Float and then into the River Mersey.

== Community ==
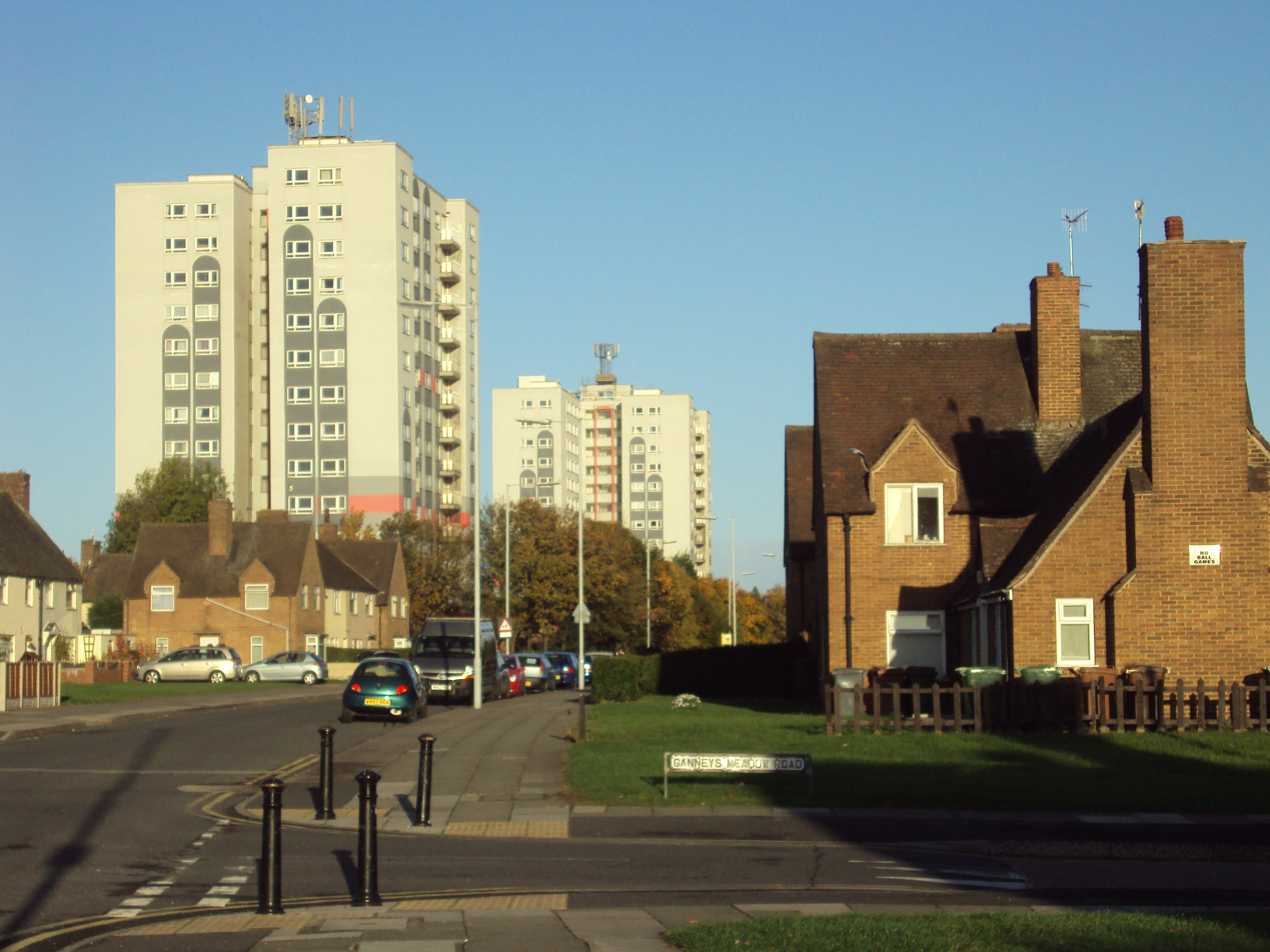
New Hey Road.

The housing estate was planned in 1944 by Sir Charles Reilly, although this scheme was replaced by that of his student, H. J. Rowse. Building commenced in 1946, with the first house being officially opened on 6 May 1949.

The housing estate itself is populated by mainly low income residents, with well above average levels of unemployment. During the late 1960s and 1970s, youths from Woodchurch were periodically involved in gang violence with youths from neighbouring estates. In the early 1980s, during a period of exceptionally high national unemployment, the area gained a reputation for drug and social problems (as did some neighbouring estates like those of Noctorum and Ford). In the late 1980s the estate was given a facelift, along with some of its neighbours. Today its social problems are largely a thing of the past, although unemployment levels are still above the UK national average.

=== Religion ===
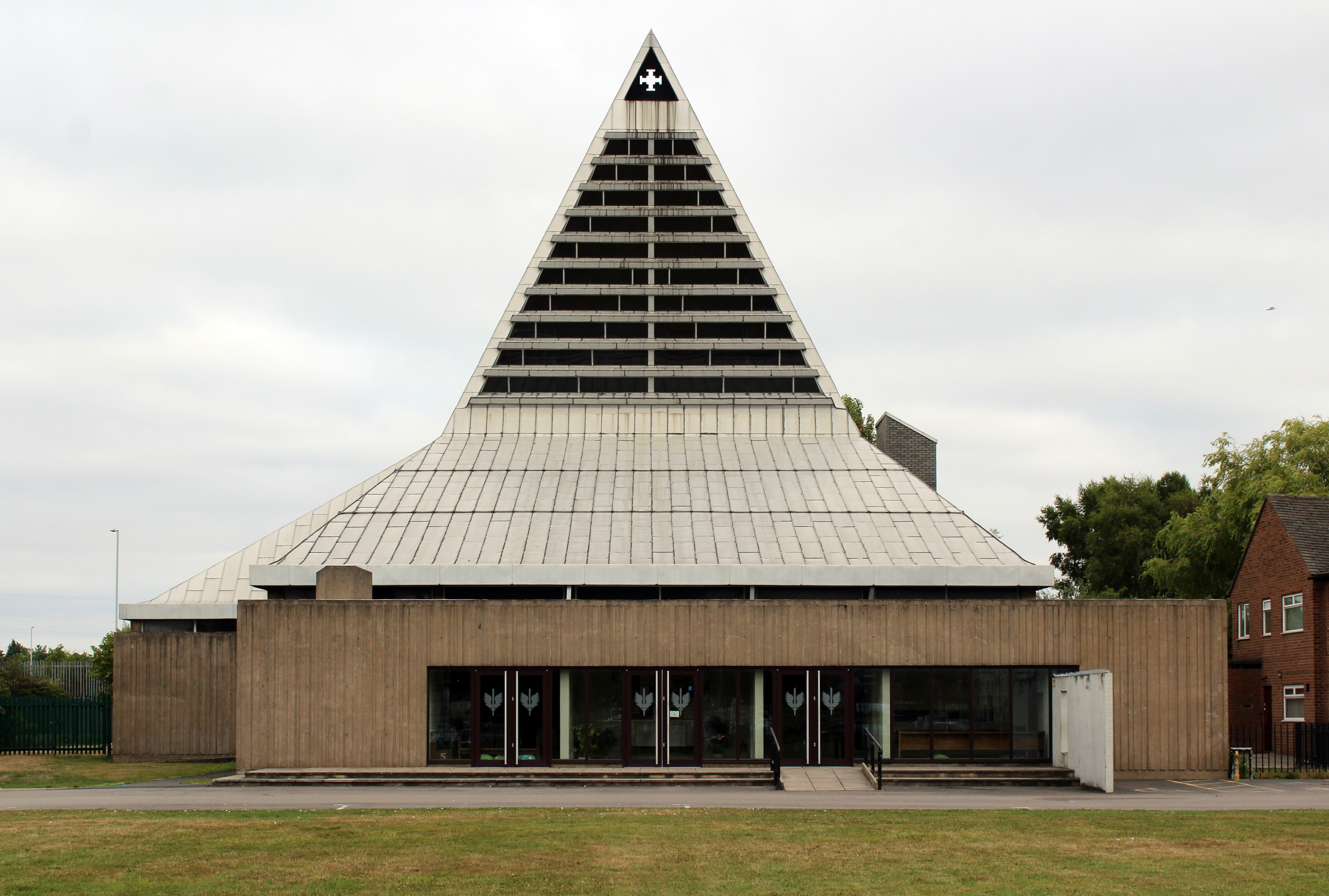
St. Michael and All Angels Catholic Church, Woodchurch

Holy Cross Church is the Church of England church, dating from the 12th century. The distinctive Roman Catholic St. Michael and All Angels church was designed by the F. X. Velarde Partnership. This church was commissioned in 1962 and opened in 1965, to serve the parish which had been founded in 1952. Woodchurch Methodist Chapel was built in 1963.

=== Education ===
Despite the low income catchment area, the local comprehensive, Woodchurch High School, has consistently attained a strong ranking in the Government's national league tables for secondary education. Noctorum Girls School (later known as St. Benedict's) was situated on the edge of the estate, on the Woodchurch side of the M53 motorway. The school later closing in the early 2000s and, after being demolished in 2009, the site is now being redeveloped for new housing.

=== Leisure ===
==== Public houses ====
Woodchurch has two public houses, these being The Woodchurch and the Arrowe Park Hotel. The Pelican was closed and demolished in the early 2000s. The Stirrup closed in November 2018.

==== Parks and commons ====
Woodchurch is situated adjacent to Arrowe Park. The housing estate is separated from the M53 motorway by a large piece of common land.

=== Sport ===
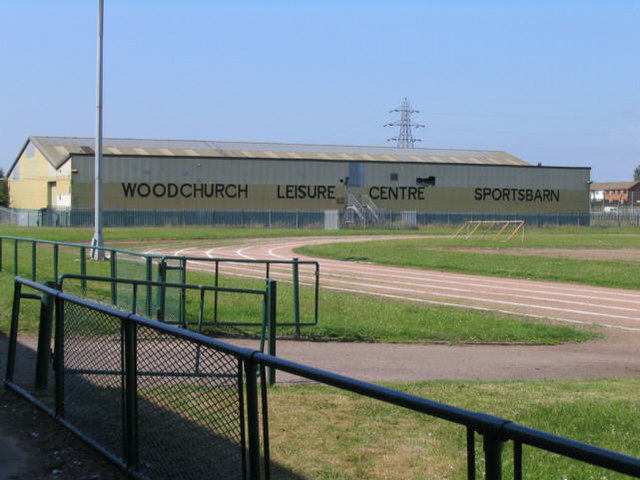
The Woodchurch Sportsbarn, adjacent to the leisure centre, in 2006

Woodchurch Leisure Centre has an indoor 25 m (82 ft) heated swimming pool, an aerobics studio, an adjacent social hub and a caged floodlit sports area with football pitches. The leisure centre hosts the Wirral Judo Club, as well as karate and archery clubs. The leisure centre is now permanently closed.

== Transport ==
=== Road ===
The A551 runs along the western side of Woodchurch, and the A552 along the southern side. The A552 and the M53 motorway cross with a three-level stacked roundabout interchange at Junction 3 of the motorway, which is at the south-eastern corner of the housing estate. The M53 runs on an approximate north-south axis along the eastern side of the housing estate. The A5027 Upton bypass runs along the northern side of Woodchurch.

==== Buses ====
Services are run primarily by Stagecoach, and are coordinated by Merseytravel.

=== Rail ===
Upton railway station is the nearest station to Woodchurch, where Transport for Wales operate battery powered electric BR Class 230 trains (also known as the D Train) created from converted former London Underground D Stock, between Bidston and Wrexham on the Borderlands Line. Woodchurch railway station is a proposed new station for this line and would most likely be sited at the point the A552 crosses under the Borderlands Line. These plans were revived when stated as an election promise by Liverpool City Region Mayor Steve Rotheram in 2024.

=== Cycling ===
National Cycle Route 56 passes along the eastern side of the housing estate, along Ackers Road, Home Farm Road, New Hey Road and Carr Bridge Road, then on a paved path towards Upton railway station. This route goes from Chester to Liverpool, via Leasowe and Seacombe, and includes part of the Wirral Way along its course.

== Notable people ==
- Richard Adams, religious writer, raised in Woodchurch.
- Thomas Adams, religious writer, raised in Woodchurch.
- Richard Sherlock, clergyman, baptised at Woodchurch.
- Bryan Robin, English Anglican priest, incumbent in Woodchurch.

== See also ==
- Listed buildings in Woodchurch, Merseyside
