= Woodchurch railway station =

Proposed railway station on the Borderlands Line in Wirral, England

Coordinates: 53.3709°N 3.0676°W

Woodchurch

General information
- Location: Wirral, Merseyside; England
- Grid reference: SJ290865
Location

Woodchurch is a proposed railway station in Merseyside, situated between Upton and Heswall on the Borderlands Line.

According to the Core Strategy for Wirral report, compiled by the local council, Woodchurch railway station is one of the council's long-term objectives. The proposal was also mentioned in Merseytravel's 30-year plan of 2014.

The October 2017 Liverpool City Region Combined Authority update to the Long Term Rail Strategy mentions the station as being built between Network Rail Control Periods CP5 and CP7.

A new proposal to open a station was raised by Metro Mayor of the Liverpool City Region Steve Rotheram as part of his re-election plans in January 2020. The proposal was again raised as part of his re-election plans in 2024, with the new railway station being a priority along with new stations at Daresbury and Carr Mill.

The land for the station has been reserved by the Metropolitan Borough of Wirral's local planning authority, which considers the station to be justified by the size of the catchment population.

Preceding station	Future services	Following station
Heswall	Transport for Wales Borderlands Line	Upton
