= Egremont, Merseyside =

Area of Wallasey, England

Coordinates: 53.4236°N 3.0375°W

Egremont
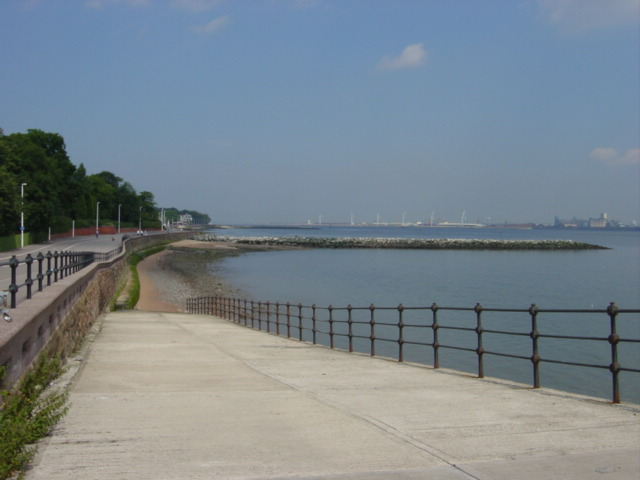
- Slipway and promenade at Egremont, looking towards the mouth of the Mersey

- Location within Merseyside
- OS grid reference: SJ317923
  - London: 181 mi (291 km) SE
- Metropolitan borough: Wirral
- Metropolitan county: Merseyside
- Region: North West
- Country: England
- Sovereign state: United Kingdom
- Post town: WALLASEY
- Postcode district: CH44
- Dialling code: 0151
- ISO 3166 code: GB-WRL
- Police: Merseyside
- Fire: Merseyside
- Ambulance: North West
- UK Parliament: Wallasey

Egremont is an area of Wallasey, in the Metropolitan Borough of Wirral, Merseyside, England. Historically part of Cheshire and in the north east of the Wirral Peninsula, it is bordered by New Brighton to the north, Liscard to the west and Seacombe to the south.

== History ==
Egremont was considered part of the Liscard township until the 1820s, when expansion of Liscard was deemed significant enough that it should be split into two townships.

One of the earliest buildings in Egremont was the Liscard Manor House, also known as the 'Seabank'. Dating back to the 1790s, it was home to the influential Penkett and Maddock families. The area which grew up around Seabank was eventually to become the Mariners' home founded in 1892 by William Cliff.

The name of the area was decided by one Captain Askew who built a house in the area as early as 1835 and named the village 'Egremont' after his Cumberland birthplace.

Egremont Ferry was built in 1827 and was the longest pier on Merseyside until its dismantlement in 1946 due to a coaster having crashed into it, causing irreparable damage.

The MV Egremont, an ex-Mersey Ferry named for the town, was sold in 1975 and converted into a floating base for the Island Cruising Club, based in Salcombe, Devon. In 2016, the vessel underwent extensive repairs in Sharpness, Gloucestershire, before being laid up and subsequently offered for sale.

== Geography ==
Egremont is in the north-eastern part of the Wirral Peninsula, on the western side of the River Mersey, about 2 km (1.2 mi) south-south-east of the Irish Sea at New Brighton and about 12 km (7.5 mi) east-north-east of the Dee Estuary at West Kirby. The area is situated at an elevation of between 10–35 m (33–115 ft) above sea level.

== Description ==
Today three and four-bedroomed, largely working class terraced houses and semi-detached homes dominate Egremont. A small shopping area is located along King Street, the main road of the district. Egremont's river frontage is part of the promenade which, under various names, runs as an unbroken traffic-free pedestrian route from Seacombe Ferry to New Brighton.

The central point of Egremont Promenade is the site of the Egremont Ferry, reached from Tobin Street. For a number of years there was a building there known locally as 'The Beehive'. This building began life as a police station before the interiors and exterior panels were ripped out leaving only a brick frame and tiled roof. There was also a number of other structures which were probably part of the ferry buildings. Before their demolition in 1983, these buildings served as homes to a boat yard, the base for a motorboat club and also the infamous 'Davy Jones Locker' club. To either side of this minor promontory there is access to the sea-shore. One of the most prominent buildings visible from the promenade is Wallasey Town Hall - now one of the administrative buildings for Wirral Council. This large building is reached by road from Brighton Street, or via a lengthy flight of steps from the promenade.

Tobin Street with Church Street marks the boundary between the municipal wards of Liscard and Seacombe, the Church referred to being St John's Church at the top of Church Street on Liscard Road, just within Central Park.

Tobin Street, leading down to the promenade, is named after John Tobin. He owned the land from Tobin Street to Kinglake Road and between Wright Street. His home was located in what is now Central Park. When he died he gave the land to the community. By the early 21st century his house had become derelict and was demolished in 2009.

Egremont Primary school serves the community and is sited on Church Street.
