= Church of Our Lady Star of the Sea, Wallasey =

Coordinates: 53.4114°N 3.0263°W

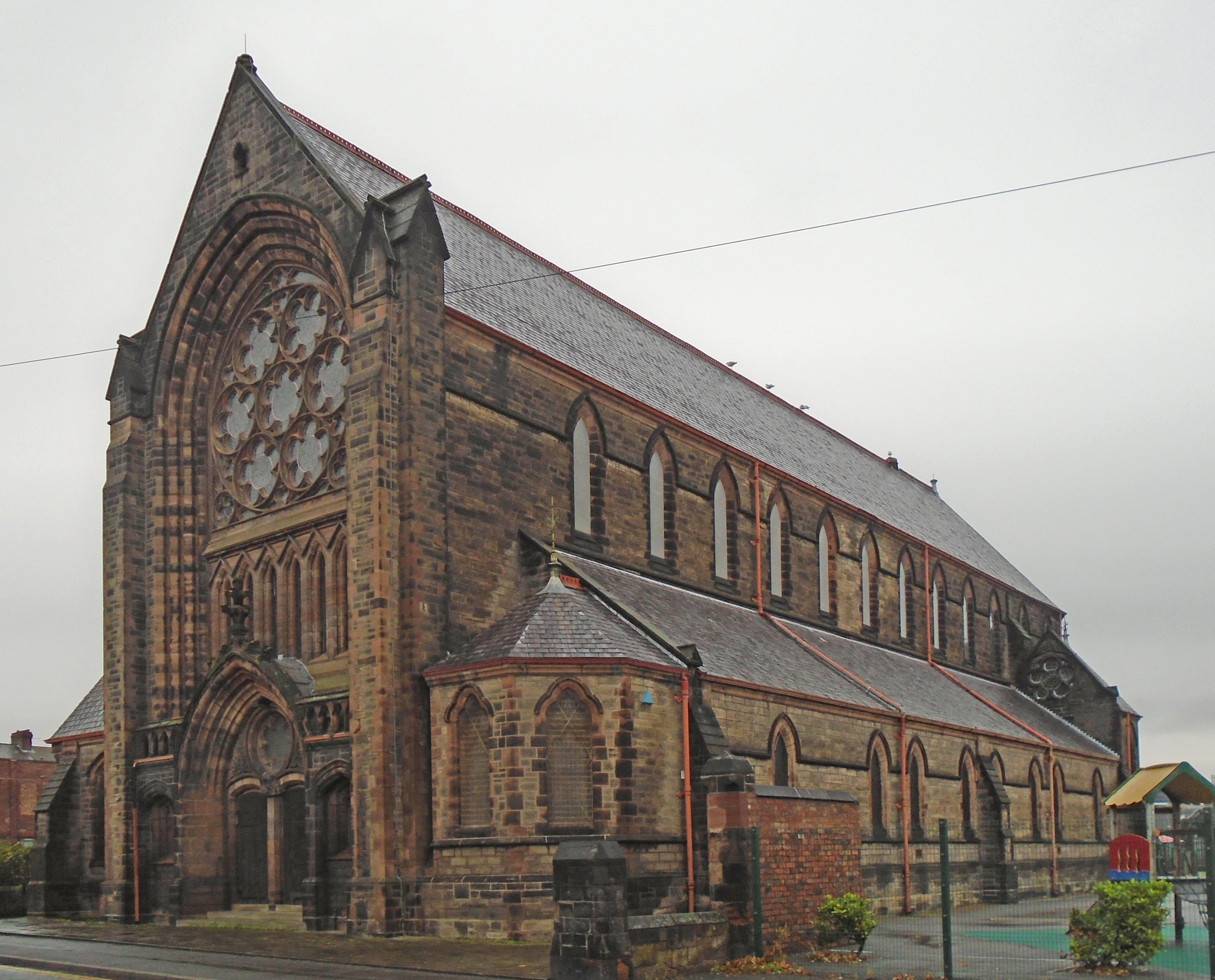
- Church of Our Lady Star of the Sea, Wallasey, from the southwest

- Location in Merseyside
- OS grid reference: SJ 319 910
- Location: Wheatland Lane, Seacombe, Wallasey, Wirral, Merseyside
- Country: England
- Denomination: Roman Catholic
- Website: Parish of St Joseph and St Alban, Wallasey

History
- Status: Parish church

Architecture
- Functional status: Active
- Heritage designation: Grade II
- Designated: 20 January 1988
- Architect: Edmund Kirby
- Architectural type: Church
- Style: Gothic Revival
- Groundbreaking: 1888
- Completed: 1889

Specifications
- Materials: Stone, slate roof

Administration
- Diocese: Shrewsbury
- Parish: Our Lady Star of the Sea and St Joseph, Wallasey

Clergy
- Priest: Fr David Long

The Church of Our Lady Star of the Sea is in Wheatland Lane, Seacombe, Wallasey, Wirral, Merseyside, England. It is an active Roman Catholic parish church in the diocese of Shrewsbury, and its parish is combined with that of St Joseph, Wallasey. The church is recorded in the National Heritage List for England as a designated Grade II listed building.

== History ==
In 1860 the Seacombe Mission was founded by St Alban's Church, Liscard, and the Roman Catholics of Seacombe first worshipped in the upper room of a house. In 1862 a combined school and chapel were built. The local population was growing, and in 1870 a plot of land was bought, and a presbytery and school were erected. No church was built at this time, part of the school being used as a chapel. In 1883, following a legacy left by a local resident, it was agreed that some of the money should be used to finance the building of a church. Edmund Kirby was chosen as the architect, the foundation stone was laid in 1888, and the church opened in July 1889.

The church was damaged slightly by bombs in the Second World War, following which it was renovated. It was reordered following the Second Vatican Council, and there was a more substantial reordering in 2006.

== Architecture ==
=== Exterior ===
The church is built in stone with a slate roof. Its plan consists of a five-bay nave with a clerestory, north and south aisles under lean-to roofs, a south chapel, and a chancel with a canted apse. The west front has an arched doorway with a sexfoil in the tympanum. This is flanked by gabled buttresses. Above the doorway are five lancet windows. At the top of the west front is a gable containing a large rose window. At the west end of the aisles are paired windows with a cinquefoil above. Along the south side of the aisle and on both sides of the clerestory are lancets. On the north side of the church are two gabled transeptal bays with rose windows forming confessionals. There is also a gabled porch and a baptistry. At the east end of the chancel is a three-light window, and on the sides are lancets. The east window contains Geometrical tracery.

=== Interior ===
Inside the church the nave and chancel are in one vessel with a single waggon roof. The five-bay arcades are carried on round piers. The octagonal pulpit is in stone with clustered shafts in marble. The high altar and the reredos date from about 1900 and are panelled with coloured marble. Flanking the chancel arch are canopied statues of Our Lady and Saint Joseph. The stained glass in the east window is in memory of those who fell in the First World War.

== See also ==
- Listed buildings in Wallasey
