= St Paul's Church, Seacombe =

Coordinates: 53.4092°N 3.0202°W

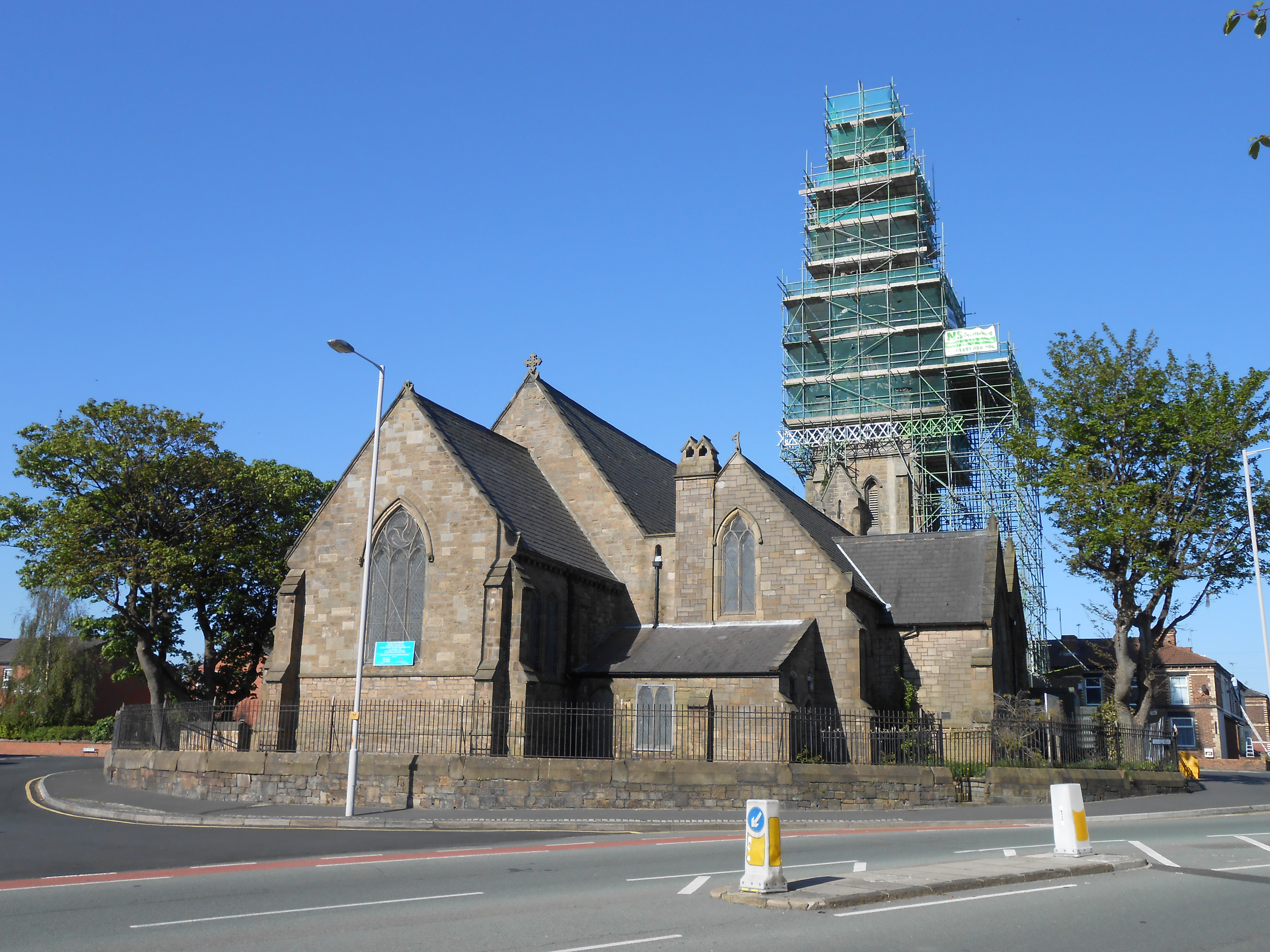
- St Paul's Church, Seacombe, during reconstruction of the spire

- Location in Merseyside
- OS grid reference: SJ 323 908
- Location: Church Crescent, Seacombe, Wallasey, Wirral, Merseyside
- Country: England
- Denomination: Anglican
- Churchmanship: Evangelical
- Website: St Paul, Seacombe

History
- Status: Parish church
- Consecrated: 12 October 1847

Architecture
- Functional status: Active
- Heritage designation: Grade II
- Designated: 12 March 2009
- Architect: John Hay
- Architectural type: Church
- Style: Gothic Revival
- Groundbreaking: 1846
- Completed: 1891

Specifications
- Materials: Sandstone, slate roofs

Administration
- Province: York
- Diocese: Chester
- Archdeaconry: Chester
- Deanery: Wallasey
- Parish: St Paul, Seacombe

Clergy
- Vicar: Reverend Peter Timothy Cooper

St Paul's Church is an active Anglican parish church in Church Crescent, Seacombe, Wallasey, Wirral, Merseyside, England. It belongs to the deanery of Wallasey, the archdeaconry of Chester and the diocese of Chester. The church is recorded in the National Heritage List for England as a designated Grade II listed building.

== History ==
Until the 19th century Seacombe was an agricultural community, and in the 1840s wealthy businessmen from Liverpool began to build large houses in the area. St Paul's was built at an early stage in this development, and was intended to serve both communities. The church occupies a prominent site in the area, and is raised on a plateau overlooking the ferry terminal. It was built in 1846–47 and was designed by John Hay, a Liverpool architect. The church was consecrated on 12 October 1847, and the spire was completed in 1849. The south aisle was added in 1859, and in 1891 the north aisle, Lady Chapel, and west gallery were built. During the Second World War the east end of the church was damaged by bombs and had to be rebuilt. Also, in the middle of the 20th century, the fabric of the spire had become unsafe. The top 20 feet (6.1 m) of the spire were removed, and were replaced by a crown of thorns made by Cammell Laird of Birkenhead. In 2013–14 the spire was dismantled, a stainless steel frame was built, and the spire was reconstructed, re-using the stone up to the former level, and adding new material to the top of the spire to restore it to its original height.

== Architecture ==
=== Exterior ===
St Paul's is built in sandstone with Welsh slate roofs. Its architectural style is that of 1300. The plan consists of a seven-bay nave, a south aisle, also of seven bays, a south porch, a north aisle of six bays, a north transept containing a Lady Chapel, a two-bay chancel, a north vestry, and a steeple at the northwest corner. Around the church are buttresses and between them, along the sides of the church, are tall pointed windows containing geometrical and curvilinear tracery. The east window has three lights, and the west window has four lights with a trefoil window above. Along the roof of the south aisle are gabled dormers with trefoil windows. The south porch is gabled, and contains stone benches and narrow windows. At the west end is a hexagonal stair turret leading to the west gallery. The steeple consists of a three-stage tower and a spire. The tower contains a west door, and at its top are pinnacles and small gables. The top of the spire consists of the new material added during its reconstruction.

=== Interior ===
The interior of the church is plastered. Between the nave and the aisles are five-bay arcades with clustered piers and carved capitals. The roof of the nave has scissor-braced trusses with pendants, and is supported by corbels carved as angels. The chancel arch is moulded, the chancel ceiling is panelled and painted, and around the chancel is a painted dado. The stone pulpit is to the left of the chancel arch, it incorporates marble shafts, and is inscribed with Alpha and Omega symbols and the IHS Christogram. The sandstone font dates from the early 20th century. The organ was made by Henry Willis & Sons.

== Appraisal ==
The church was designated as a Grade II listed building on 12 March 2009. Grade II is the lowest of the three grades of listing and is applied to buildings that are "nationally important and of special interest". The reasons given for listing include that the church "has special historic interest in acting as a landmark for ships navigating their way on the River Mersey" during the mid to late 19th century.

== See also ==
- Listed buildings in Wallasey
