= Peter Watson =

Peter Watson may refer to:

- Peter William Watson (1761–1830), English merchant and botanist
- Peter Watson (shoemaker) (fl. 1824), shoemaker and political activist, Chester-le-Street, England
- Peter Watson (arts benefactor) (1908–1956), British art collector, benefactor and publisher
- Peter Watson (ophthalmologist) (1930–2017), British ophthalmologist
- Peter Watson (footballer, born 1934) (1934–2013), English footballer for Nottingham Forest and Southend United
- Peter Watson (footballer, born 1935) (1935–2016), English footballer for Workington
- Peter Watson (bishop) (born 1936), Anglican Archbishop of Melbourne, 2000–2005
- Peter Watson (musician) (born 1941), rock guitarist and member of English 1960s band The Action
- Peter Watson (intellectual historian) (born 1943), English intellectual historian and author
- Peter Watson (footballer, born 1944), Northern Irish footballer
- Peter Watson (politician) (born 1947), member of the Western Australian parliament
- Peter Watson (cyclist) (born 1950), English cyclist
- Peter Watson (photographer) (born 1952), British landscape photographer
