= St Hilary's Church =

St Hilary's Church may refer to:

== Australia ==
- St Hilary's Anglican Church, Melbourne, Victoria

== United Kingdom ==
- St Hilary's Chapel (also known as St Hilary's Church), Denbigh, Denbighshire, Wales
- St Hilary's Church, St Hilary (Cornwall), England
- St Hilary's Church, St Hilary (Vale of Glamorgan), Wales
- St Hilary's Church, Wallasey, Merseyside, England

== United States ==
- St. Hilary Roman Catholic Church, Washington, Pennsylvania
- Old Saint Hilary's Church, Marin County, California
