= St Alban's Church, Wallasey =

Coordinates: 53.4181°N 3.0446°W

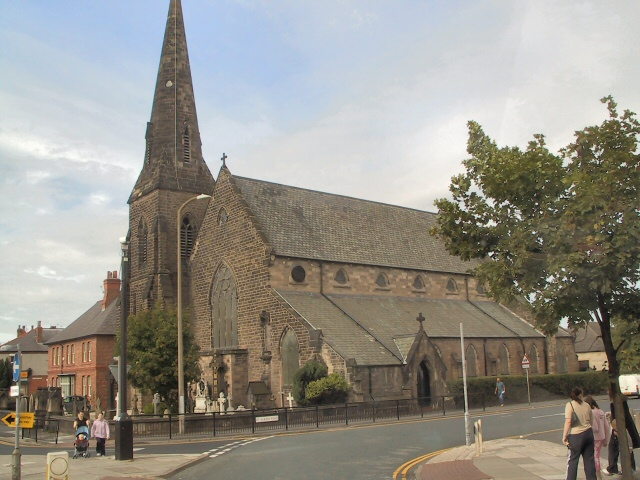
- St Alban's Church, Wallasey, from the northwest

- Location in Merseyside
- Location: Mill Lane, Liscard, Wallasey, Wirral, Merseyside
- Country: England
- Denomination: Roman Catholic
- Website: Parish of St Joseph and St Alban, Wallasey

History
- Dedication: Saint Alban

Architecture
- Functional status: Active
- Heritage designation: Grade II
- Designated: 20 January 1988
- Architect(s): Stephen R. Eyre and Joseph Hansom
- Architectural type: Church
- Style: Gothic Revival
- Groundbreaking: 1852
- Completed: 1853

Administration
- Diocese: Shrewsbury

Clergy
- Priest: Revd Devan Arul

St Alban's Church, is in Mill Lane, Liscard, Wallasey, Wirral, Merseyside, England. It is an active Roman Catholic church in the diocese of Shrewsbury. The church is recorded in the National Heritage List for England as a designated Grade II listed building.

== History ==
St Alban's was built in 1852–53, before which the local Roman Catholics met in a nearby school that was built in 1842. The church was designed by Stephen R. Eyre and Joseph Hansom. The foundation stone was laid on 8 June 1852, and the church opened in September 1853. It was originally planned to have two aisles, but the north aisle was omitted to reduce the cost. In 1904 the steeple was partly taken down and rebuilt. In the early 20th century the north wall suffered from subsidence and had to be rebuilt together with the chancel arch in 1913–14. The church was damaged in 1941 and lost some of its fittings, including an elaborately decorated altar, statues, and some stained glass. The interior of the church was re-ordered in 1952 when the canopies were removed from the Stations of the Cross. In 1977 the sanctuary was re-ordered in accordance with the Second Vatican Council, and there was another re-ordering in 2004.

== Architecture ==
The church is constructed in stone with roofs of hexagonal slates. It consists of a six-bay nave with a clerestory, a south aisle under a lean-to roof, a south porch, a chancel with a north vestry and a south Lady chapel, and a steeple at the northwest corner. The tower has angle buttresses, a west entrance above which is a niche, pairs of louvred bell openings, and a broach spire with lucarnes. On the east side of the tower is a canted stair tower with a small spire. At the west end of the nave is a four-light window with Decorated tracery. To the right of the window is a niche, and to the right of this is the three-light aisle west window. Along the south side of the aisle are two-light windows separated by buttresses, the second bay containing a gabled porch. The clerestory contains spherical triangular windows. Along the north wall are two tiers of windows, between which are buttresses rising above the eaves. The east window has four lights. Inside the church the six-bay arcade is carried on quatrefoil piers. At the west end is a wooden gallery. In the chancel is a triple sedilia, and between the chancel and the chapel is a two-bay arcade with a parclose screen. Around the walls are three-dimensional Stations of the Cross containing crowd scenes.

== See also ==
- Listed buildings in Wallasey
