= Listed buildings in Wallasey =

Wallasey is a town in Wirral, Merseyside, England. It contains 35 buildings that are recorded in the National Heritage List for England as designated listed buildings. Of these, three are listed at Grade II*, the middle of the three grades, and the others are at Grade II, the lowest grade. Originally a number of small separate villages, the town grew in the 19th century to become a dormitory town for Liverpool. It also contains part of Birkenhead Docks. There are only four listed buildings dating from before the 19th century, namely the isolated tower of a medieval church, a house, a rectory, and a former grammar school. The later listed buildings include houses, churches, public houses, buildings associated with the docks, the town hall, a library, part of a school, a watercourse, and two war memorials.

== Key ==
Grade	Criteria
II*	Particularly important buildings of more than special interest
II	Buildings of national importance and special interest

== Buildings ==
Name and location	Photograph	Date	Notes	Grade
Tower, St Hilary's Church; 53.42119°N 3.06032°W		13th century	The tower of the original church stands separately from the present church, the rest having burnt down in 1857. The lower part is the older, and the upper parts date from 1530. The tower is in three stages with diagonal buttresses, and has blocked openings. In the top stage are louvred bell openings, and at the top of the tower is an embattled parapet with gargoyles.	II
The Old House; 53.41134°N 3.05171°W		1627	A house mainly in stone with some brick at the rear and with a slate roof. It has two storeys and an attic, and is in three bays. The windows are mullioned, and there are two gabled dormers. The doorway has a large inscribed lintel and a hood mould.	II
Old Rectory; 53.42096°N 3.06116°W		17th century	A stone house with a roughcast 20th-century extension. It has two storeys, an attic, and a basement. There is a two-bay front with a central entrance, mullioned windows, and a gabled dormer.	II
180 Breck Road; 53.41809°N 3.05967°W		1799	Built as Wallasey Grammar School and later used as a private house. It is in stone with a slate roof, in one storey and three bays. On the front are two blocked entrances, a glazed door, and casement windows. On the gabled street front are a blocked round-headed window and a sash window.	II
8–26 Manor Road; 53.42128°N 3.04325°W		Early 19th century	A terrace of ten stone houses with slate roofs. They have two storeys, and each house has two bays. Two groups of four bays project forward under gables. Most of the windows are horizontally-sliding sashes.	II
St John's Church; 53.41624°N 3.03334°W		1832–33	A church, now redundant, by Henry Turberville Edwards in Neoclassical style. It is stuccoed with stone dressings and a stone façade. The façade has a Doric portico with four fluted columns, and an entablature with a triglyph frieze and a pediment. There are windows with architraves and pediments flanking the portico and along the sides of the church.	II
St Paul's Church; 53.40920°N 3.02023°W		1846–47	The church was designed by John Hay in the style of 1300, and was enlarged in 1859 and in 1891. It is in sandstone with Welsh slate roofs, and consists of a nave with a dormers, aisles, a north transept, a chancel, and a north vestry. At the northwest is a steeple with a three-stage tower with pinnacles and spire, shortened in height in the 20th century, and restored to its original height in 2013–14.	II
Springvale Terrace; 53.42077°N 3.03701°W		c. 1850	A terrace of four brick houses with stone dressings and a slate roof. They have three storeys and nine bays, the outer two bays at each end projecting forward. The windows are sashes with wedge lintels. The entrances are round-headed with fanlights. The garden walls are included in the listing.	II
St Alban's Church; 53.41811°N 3.04457°W		1852–53	A Roman Catholic church by Stephen R. Eyre and Joseph Hansom in stone with a slate roof. It consists of a nave with a clerestory, a south aisle, a south porch, a chancel with a north vestry and a south Lady chapel, and a northwest steeple. The steeple has a tower with angle buttresses, and a broach spire with lucarnes.	II
Gateway to former Liscard Battery; 53.43235°N 3.03434°W		1858	The entrance to the former battery is in stone, and has a central four-centred arch with a datestone above. This is flanked by octagonal towers with arrow slits, cornices and embattled parapets.	II
St Hilary's Church; 53.42164°N 3.05997°W		1858–59	The church was built in the churchyard of a medieval church that had been destroyed by fire in 1857. It was designed by W. and J. Hay, and is built in stone with a slate roof. The church consists of a nave with a clerestory, aisles, transepts, a chancel with a north vestry and a south chapel, and a tower at the crossing. The tower has an embattled parapet with gargoyles, and an octagonal stair turret rising to a greater height.	II
4–6 Prospect Vale; 53.42386°N 3.05904°W		c. 1860	A pair of back-to-back houses in rendered stone with a slate roof. They have two storeys and three bays with central entrances. The windows in No. 4 are casements, and those in No. 6 are sashes.	II
8–10 Prospect Vale; 53.42394°N 3.05847°W		c. 1860	A pair of back-to-back houses in rendered stone with a slate roof. They have two storeys and three bays with central entrances and casement windows. No. 8 has a lean-to extension, and No. 10 has a 20th-century porch.	II
12–14 Prospect Vale; 53.42405°N 3.05793°W		c. 1860	A pair of back-to-back houses in rendered stone with a slate roof. They have two storeys and three bays with central entrances and 20th-century casement windows. Both houses have openwork lattice porches.	II
Accumulator tower 53.40450°N 3.01570°W		1860	The accumulator tower is at the entrance to Alfred Dock, it is built in brick, and has stone dressings. The tower has a square plan and is in two stages. It has corner buttresses, a corbelled cornice, and a coped parapet. The windows are round headed, and grouped in pairs and triplets. On the south side is a round-headed doorway.	II
Wallasey Water Tower; 53.41786°N 3.04578°W		1860	The water tower is in brick on a stone base with stone dressings. It has a square plan, is in five storeys, and in Romanesque style with a round-headed entrance. On each side is a giant arch containing pairs of round-headed windows with colonnettes. At the top is a Lombard frieze, a cornice, and a machicolated parapet.	II
Grain warehouse (north); 53.40524°N 3.02835°W		1868	The warehouse was designed by G. F. Lister, and has been converted into flats. It is in brick on a stone base, with stone dressings, and has six storeys, with 18 bays along the front and five along the sides. At the top is a corbelled parapet. The windows have projecting segmental lintels with keystones and imposts. On the front are loading bays, and at the north end is a turret.	II
Grain warehouse (south); 53.40486°N 3.02855°W		1868	The warehouse was designed by G. F. Lister, and has been converted into flats. It is in brick on a stone base, with stone dressings, and has six storeys, with 24 bays along the front and five along the sides. At the top is a corbelled parapet. The windows have projecting segmental lintels with keystones and imposts. On the front are loading bays, and at the north end is a turret.	II
Central Hydraulic Tower, Great Float; 53.40214°N 3.02230°W		1868	The hydraulic generating station, now derelict, consists of an engine house and tower that were designed by J.B. Hartley. The engine house is in brick with stone dressings, it has three storeys and seven bays. A block connects it to a stone tower, which has buttresses, balconies, and clock faces. At the top are machicolations, and an embattled parapet with notched merlons.	II
St Mary's Church; 53.42325°N 3.03848°W		1876–77	The church was designed by E. W. Nobbs, with G. E. Grayson as consultant, in Gothic Revival style, the tower was added in 1882, and the church was extended in 1907. It is built in local yellow sandstone with dressings in red sandstone from Runcorn, and has slate roofs. The church has an irregular cruciform plan consisting of a nave with a south porch, transepts, a chancel with vestries to the north and a lady chapel to the south, and a west tower. The tower has three stages, diagonal buttresses, an embattled parapet with crocketed pinnacles and gargoyles, and a pyramidal roof.	II
Brighton public house 53.41582°N 3.02434°W		1886	A public house in Gothic Revival style, built in stone and brick with slate roofs, on a corner site. It has two storeys, with four bays on Brighton Street, three on Buchanan Road, and a turret on the corner. The turret is polygonal and has a crenellated parapet and a spire. On the Brighton Street front is the main entrance with an oriel window above, and three gables surmounted by seated griffins. On the other front is an arched doorway and a canted and crenellated two-storey bay window.	II
Pumping station 53.40217°N 3.01368°W		1886	The pumping station was extended in 1908. It is in common brick with red brick dressings and a slate roof, and is in six bays by three bays, with a three-bay extension. Along the front is an arcade, partly blind and partly with segmental windows and round windows above. The ends are gabled, and on the roof are louvres. At the north end is a chimney stack with a machicolated cap.	II
Church of Our Lady Star of the Sea; 53.41136°N 3.02648°W		1888–89	A Roman Catholic church by Edmund Kirby in stone with a slate roof. It consists of a nave with a clerestory, aisles, a chancel with a canted apse, chapels, a porch, and a baptistry. Most of the windows are lancets, there is a rose window at the west end, and the east window contains Geometric tracery.	II
Memorial Chapel; 53.42166°N 3.04101°W		1898–99	Originally a Unitarian church, it is now redundant and under the care of the Historic Chapels Trust. The church was designed by Edmund Waring and Edmund Rathbone in Arts and Crafts style. It is built in brick with stone dressings and has a tiled roof. The church has a rectangular plan, with a narthex at the front, a hall at the left, and a vestry and other rooms at the rear. The entrance is in an octagonal porch and has arches with columns, and a pyramidal roof. The fittings were designed by Art Nouveau craftsmen from the Bromsgrove Guild.	II*
War Memorial; 53.41633°N 3.03615°W		1899–1920	The memorial to the South African War is in Central Park, and is by J. Whitehead and Sons. It has a stone base containing inscribed names and a panel. On the base is a marble statue of Britannia standing and holding a wreath, a shield, and a flag.	II
Gorsehill water tower 53.43388°N 3.04940°W		1902–05	The stone water tower by J. H. Crowther is octagonal and has an octagonal turret rising to a greater height. The entrance and windows are round-headed, and in the top stage are round-headed openings with Ionic colonnettes. At the top of the tower is a cornice and a double-stepped embattled parapet.	II
Manor Church Centre; 53.42384°N 3.03248°W		1907–08	This church was originally a Presbyterian church, designed by Briggs, Wolstenholme and Thornley in a mixture of Arts and Crafts and Gothic Revival styles. It is in stone with a slate roof, and consists of a nave with narrow aisles, a north transept, a short chancel, and a southwest tower. A church hall was added in 1910. This is in Tudor style, and has mullioned and transomed windows.	II
St Nicholas' Church; 53.42944°N 3.07160°W		1910–11	A church in Storeton sandstone and roofed in Yorkshire stone flags, by J. F. Doyle with Perpendicular features. It has a cruciform plan, with a central tower, a nave and a chancel both with a clerestory, aisles, transepts, a Lady Chapel, a vestry, and porches. The tower has a battlemented parapet and a stair turret rising to a greater height. Inside the church, furnishings are in Arts and Crafts style.	II
Wallasey Central Library, including former Earlston House; 53.42892°N 3.04542°W		1911	The library incorporates a house dating from about 1840. The library is in red Ruabon brick and buff terracotta on a steel frame, with a green slate roof, and is in Edwardian Baroque style, and the house is in buff sandstone in Scottish Tudor Gothic style with blue slate roof. The library has a T-shaped plan, with a two-storey range facing the road and a single-storey wing to the south. The house is attached to the library, and has an L-shaped plan, and a three-storey round tower in the angle. The main front has three wide bays, with the entrance in the middle bay, which has an elaborate surround and a segmental open pediment. The outer bays project under an open pediment, and contain a Venetian window in the upper floor.	II
Town Hall; 53.41574°N 3.02331°W		1914–20	The town hall was designed by Briggs, Wolstenholme and Thornley, and is in limestone with Welsh slate roofs. It is in three storeys, and has a rectangular plan, with sides of 15 and 19 bays. In the centre is a three-stage tower with openings flanked by columns. At the corners are four figures sculpted by William Birnie Rhind. Above are porticos on each side, and a stepped pyramidal roof surmounted by a copper cupola.	II*
Egremont War Memorial; 53.41631°N 3.03276°W	St_John's_Church,_Wallasey_(6)	1921	The war memorial is in the churchyard of St John's Church. It is in Cornish granite, and consists of a wheel-head cross with a sword carved in low relief on the front of the shaft. The cross stands on a plinth on a single-step base. On the front of the plinth is an inscription.	II
Seacombe Ferry Terminal; 53.40980°N 3.01589°W		1930–33	The ferry terminal was designed by L. St G. Wilkinson, it is in brick with dressings in Portland stone, and has tiled roofs. The building consists of two ranges at right angles, and along the ground floor of both ranges is a loggia carried on pairs of Doric columns. The range parallel to the River Mersey contains booking and entrance halls and is in a single storey. Its protruding central entrance block is in stone, flanking it are three bays on each side, and above it is a brick clock tower. The other range has two storeys and eleven bays. On the central bays is a stepped parapet with urns, a flagstaff, and the municipal coat of arms.	II
Jellicoe watercourse 53.40784°N 3.11457°W	Water_barrier_at_Burton's_factory,_Moreton	1952	The watercourse is a cascade feature in the grounds of the former Cadbury factory designed by Geoffrey Jellicoe. The feature and associated structures are in concrete, brick and wrought iron. It has a linear plan and consists of a series of ten pools stepping down a slope. Associated with the feature are a retaining wall, viewing platforms, railings, and planters.	II
English Martyrs' Church; 53.42430°N 3.06340°W		1952–53	A Roman Catholic church by F. X. Velarde in Neo-Romanesque style. It is built in brick with decoration in cast stone, and with tiled roofs. The church consists of a nave with a clerestory, aisles, a Lady Chapel, and a sanctuary with a curved apse. There is an attached campanile with an octagonal cast stone lantern with a copper pyramidal roof surmounted by a cross. Inside the church is a statue and a font by Herbert Tyson Smith.	II*
Solar Campus; 53.41975°N 3.07948°W		1962	A school building designed by Emsley A. Morgan to use and conserve passive solar energy. The south front is completely glazed with two skins of glass. Other parts are in brick, stone and timber, and the roof is felted. The building is mainly in two storeys and comprises an assembly hall, gymnasium, kitchen, and corridors.	II
