= Wallasey Water Tower =

Victorian water tower in Wallasey, England

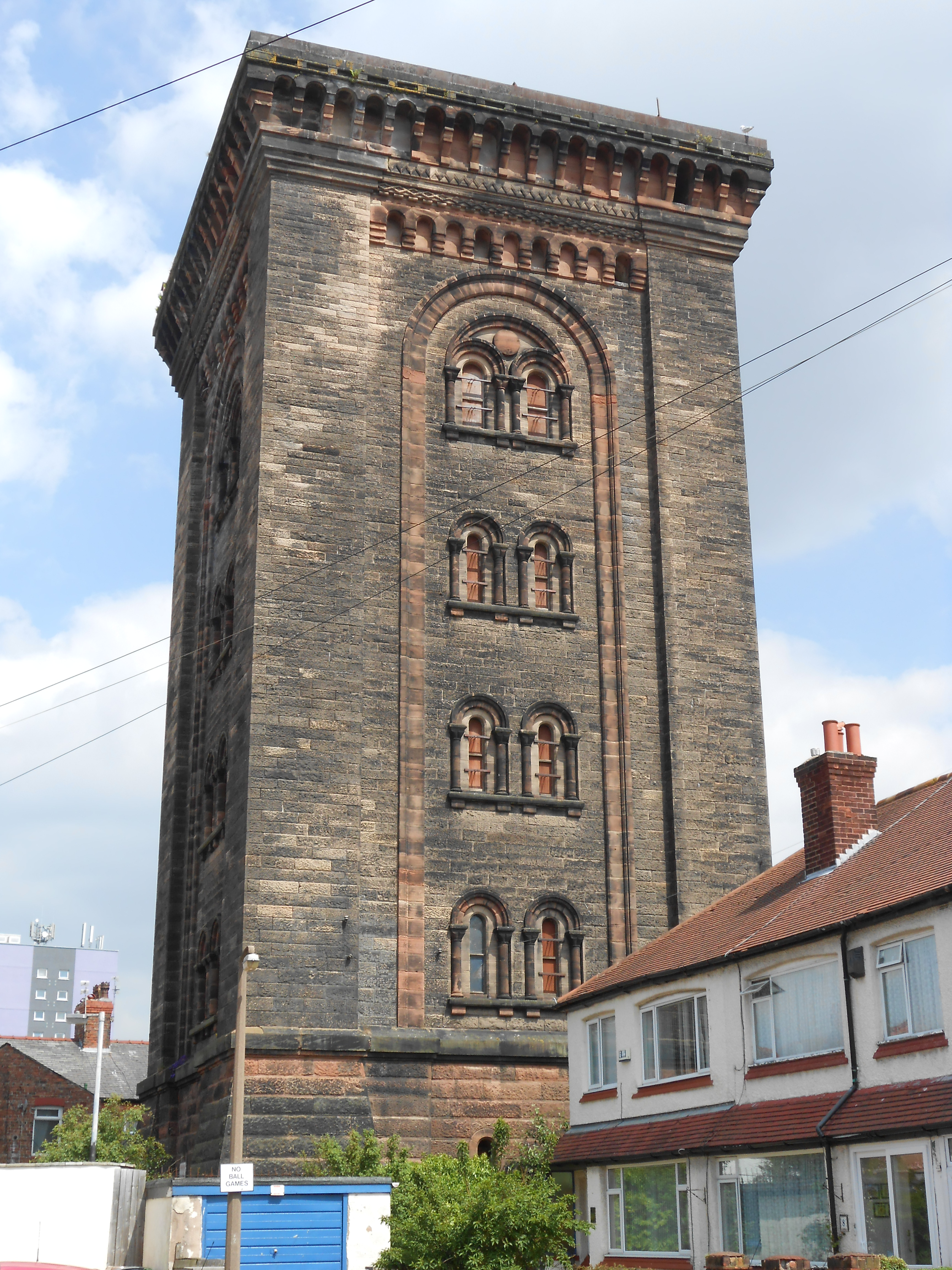
- Wallasey Water Tower, 2013

General information
- Address: 40 Mill Lane, Wallasey, Merseyside, CH44 5UG
- Coordinates: 53.41786°N 3.04578°W
- Year(s) built: 1859-1861
- Designations

Listed Building – Grade II
- Official name: Wallasey Water Tower, Mill Lane
- Designated: 20 January 1988
- Reference no.: 1258308

Wallasey Water Tower is a water tower in Wallasey, Wirral.

== History ==
The lintel above the entrance dates the tower back to 1860, however the tower was built between 1859 and 1861 and was the opened by the local MP, John Tollemache. The tower was built by local Wallasey resident Henry Pooley, whose grandfather founded Henry Pooley & Son.

The tower's tank had the capacity for around 682,000 litres (150,000 imp gal) of water, however the tower was hit by a bomb during WW2, destroying the tank. The tank was never replaced, and today the tower stands at 32 metres high with the roof where the tank would have sat. The tower is made up of five floors and the top can be reached by ascending 140 steps. Wallasey Fire Station was situated next to the tower and at one point, the tower was home to a fire bell used by the brigade to summon their firemen.

It was Grade II listed in 1988. Today, the tower is privately owned and is home to a garage, but is also available for hire and private tours.

== Architecture ==
Historic England describes it as: "The water tower is in brick on a stone base with stone dressings. It has a square plan, is in five storeys, and in Romanesque style with a round-headed entrance. On each side is a giant arch containing pairs of round-headed windows with colonnettes. At the top is a Lombard frieze, a cornice, and a machicolated parapet."

== See also ==
- Listed buildings in Wallasey
