= St John's Church, Egremont =

Coordinates: 53.4162°N 3.0335°W

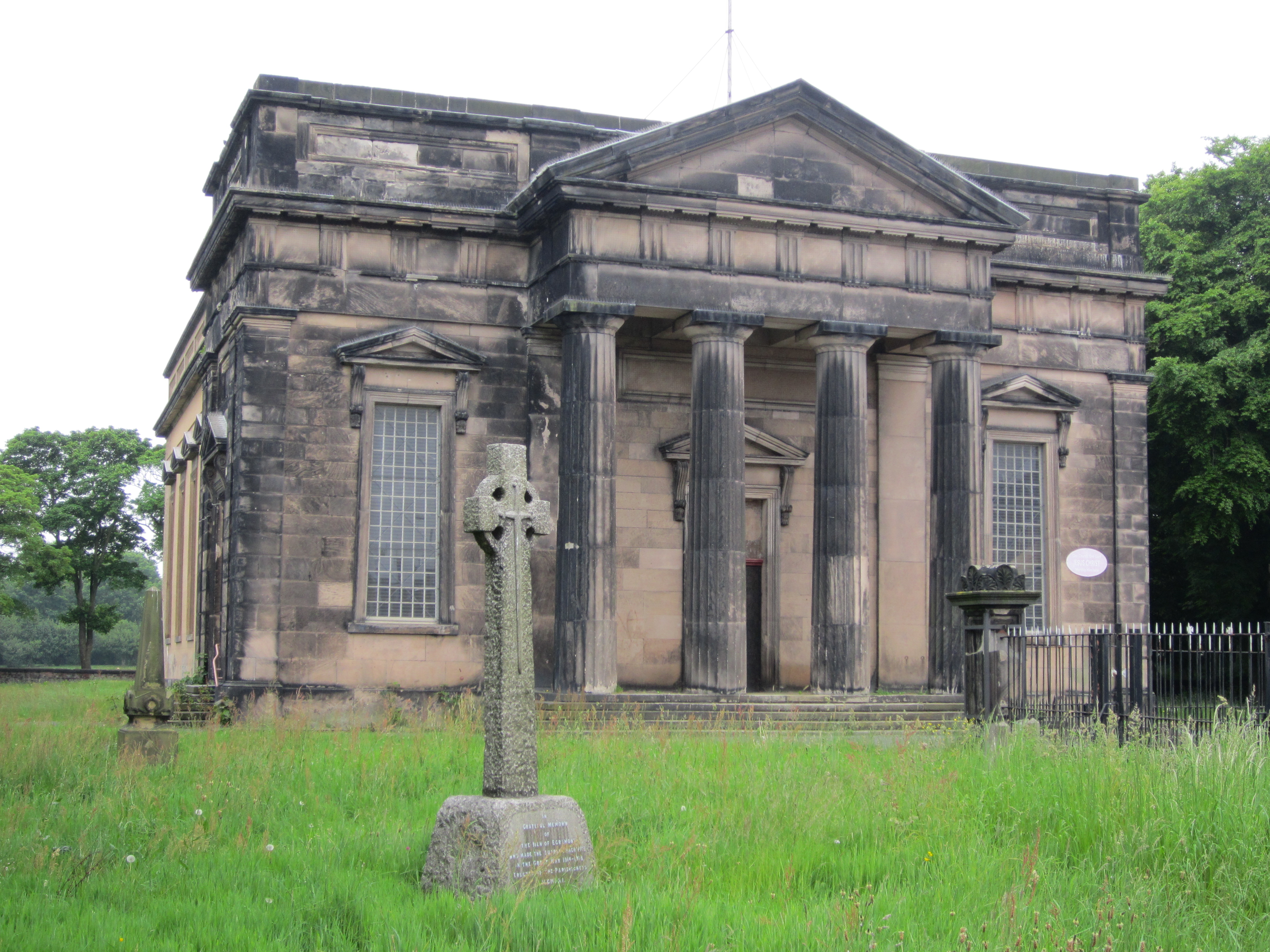
- Entrance front of St John's Church, Egremont

- Location in Merseyside
- OS grid reference: SJ 314 915
- Location: Liscard Road, Egremont, Merseyside
- Country: England
- Denomination: Anglican

History
- Consecrated: 31 September 1831

Architecture
- Functional status: Redundant
- Heritage designation: Grade II
- Designated: 20 January 1988
- Architect: Henry Turberville Edwards
- Architectural type: Church
- Style: Neoclassical
- Completed: 1833

Specifications
- Materials: Stone

St John's Church is in Liscard Road, Egremont, Merseyside, England. It is a redundant Anglican parish church, formerly in the diocese of Chester. The church is recorded in the National Heritage List for England as a designated Grade II listed building.

== History ==
St John's was built in 1832–33, and was designed by Henry Turberville Edwards; it is his only known work. The church was built on land owned by Sir John Tobin, whose son became the first vicar. The church was consecrated on 31 October 1831 by the Rt. Revd. John Bird Sumner, bishop of Chester, and it opened for worship on 19 May 1833. In 1881 it was restored by Cornelius Sherlock; this included removing the galleries, replacing box pews with benches, moving the organ, enclosing the chancel, and adding two new windows. In 1942 the church was damaged by bomb blast, and was repaired in the 1950s with a new roof. It was declared redundant on 1 July 2004, and approval for conversion into residential use was agreed on 6 December 2006. As of August 2018 the church was put into private ownership with the intention of reopening it as church again.

== Architecture ==
=== Exterior ===
The church is built in stone from Storeton quarry, and is in Neoclassical style. On the entrance front is a Doric portico consisting of four fluted columns without bases, carrying an entablature with a triglyph frieze and a pediment. Flanking the portico are windows with architraves and pediments. There are six similar windows along each side of the church, and running round the church above them is a panelled parapet. At the rear, the narrower chancel projects under a pediment. On its rear wall is a blind window with four pilasters and an entablature with wreathes.

=== Interior ===
Inside the church is an elliptical chancel arch. When the building was in use as a church, it had a tripartite painted reredos, and there were paintings round the walls of the nave. The font was in alabaster, it stood on three marble steps, and was supported by carved angels. It was decorated with cherubs' heads and gadrooning. The timber pulpit was part of a former two-decker. The ceiling has a span of 63 feet 6 inches (19.4 m), which makes it the largest unsupported ceiling in Merseyside. The original pipe organ was made by Bewsher and Fleetwood and had two manuals. This was enlarged to three manuals in 1902 by Hele and Company. It was further enlarged in 1925 by Henry Willis, repaired following bomb damage in the 1950s by Rushworth and Dreaper, cleaned in the 1970s by Cowin, and restored in 1999 by Harrison and Harrison. After the church was closed, the organ was moved by David Wells to St James' Church, New Brighton.

=== Graveyard ===
The war memorial in the churchyard was designated as a Grade II listed building on 4 January 2022. The memorial commemorates the First World War 1914-1918. It had a brass plaque inside the church but has been removed. It commemorated 96 people who lost their lives from the parish in WW1.

== See also ==
- Listed buildings in Wallasey
