= Eureka! Science + Discovery =

Tourist attraction in Seacombe, England

Coordinates: 53.409°N 3.017°W

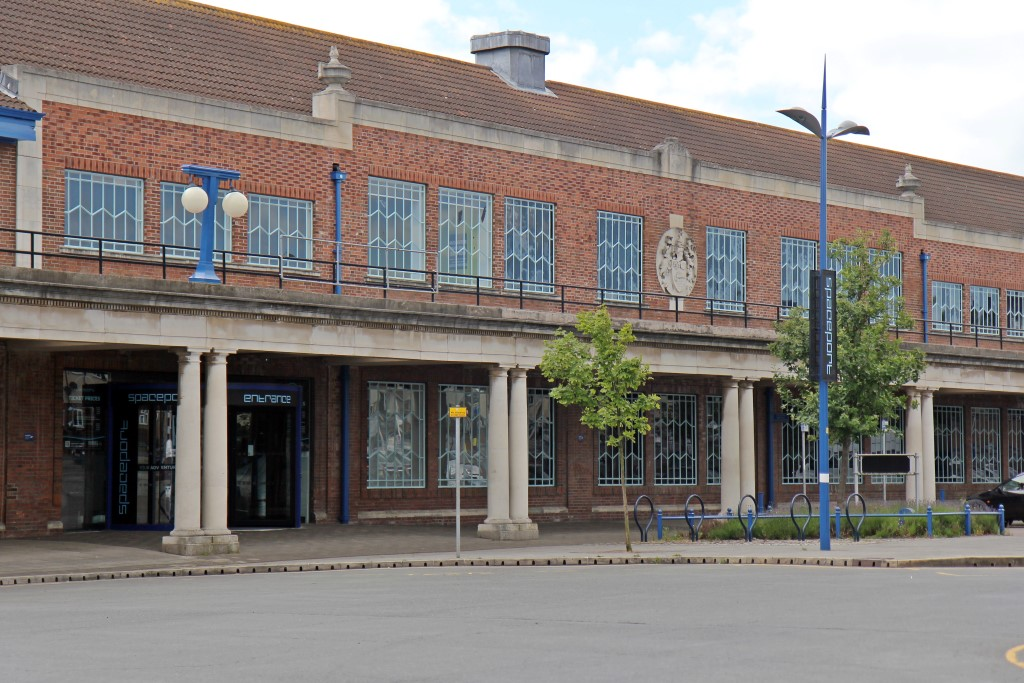
- The building, in former Spaceport branding.
- Interactive map of Eureka! Science + Discovery
- Location: Seacombe, Merseyside, England
- Status: Operating
- Opened: 2005 (as Spaceport); November 11, 2022 (as Eureka! Science + Discovery)
- Closed: 2019 (as Spaceport)
- Owner: Eureka!
- Area: Seacombe, Merseyside, England
- Website: https://www.eurekadiscovery.org.uk/

Eureka! Science + Discovery is a tourist attraction in Seacombe, Wallasey, Merseyside, North West England, which opened on 11 November 2022.. The attraction's main topic of interest is STEAM education (Science, Technology, Engineering, Arts, Maths) through playful learning and is suited to visitors aged 0–14.

The building used for the attraction was previously Spaceport and was opened on 26 July 2005 by Merseytravel Chairman Mark Dowd. The previous attraction was based around learning about space through interactive exhibits. A visit to the centre took about two hours, which included half an hour spent in the Spacedome planetarium. This section of the attraction was on the ground floor at the back of the building. Visitors to Spaceport could also take a River Explorer Cruise on a Mersey Ferry.

In July 2019 Merseytravel announced that spaceport was to close, due to a decline in visitor numbers and the attraction becoming too costly to run following government funding cuts. It was announced that the building would become another attraction, the £14m "Eureka! Science + Discovery" Centre. Merseytravel will still own the building, and the new company will operate the attraction.

== See also ==
- List of science centers#Europe
