= St Hilary's Church, Wallasey =

Coordinates: 53.42169°N 3.06017°W

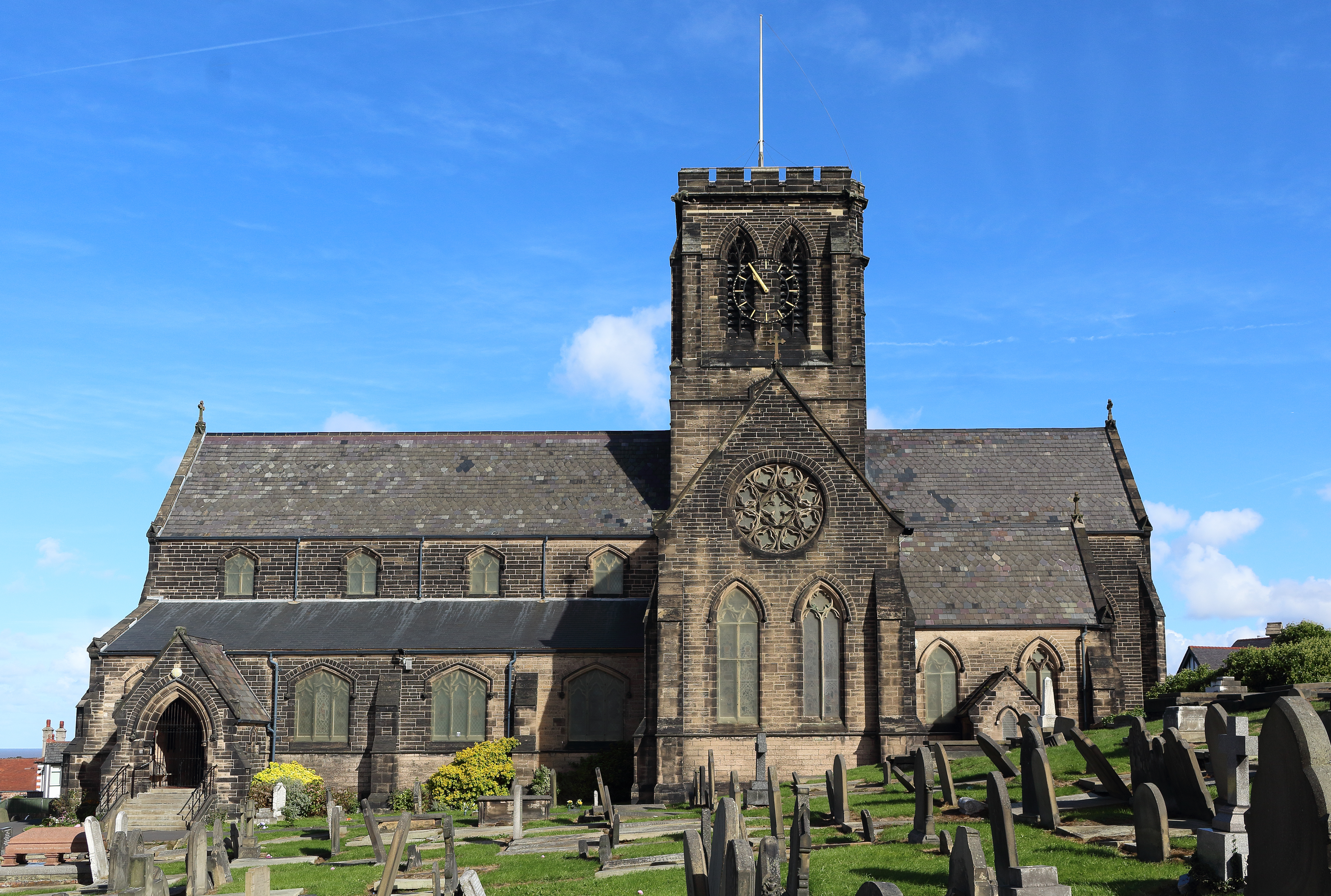
- St Hilary's Church, Wallasey, from the south

- Location in Merseyside
- OS grid reference: SJ 296 928
- Location: Wallasey, Wirral, Merseyside
- Country: England
- Denomination: Anglican
- Churchmanship: Low church
- Website: www.sthilarywallasey.org.uk

History
- Status: Parish church
- Dedication: Saint Hilary of Poitiers
- Consecrated: 1859

Architecture
- Functional status: Active
- Heritage designation: Grade II
- Designated: 20 January 1988
- Architect(s): W. & J. Hay
- Architectural type: Church
- Style: Gothic, Gothic Revival

Specifications
- Materials: Stone, slate roofs Separate tower in stone

Administration
- Province: York
- Diocese: Chester
- Archdeaconry: Chester
- Deanery: Wallasey
- Parish: Wallasey

Clergy
- Abbot: Ann Hughes
- Rector: Rev.Joshua Carlson

St Hilary's Church is in the town of Wallasey, Wirral, Merseyside, England. It consists of a church built in 1858–59 and the separate tower of a former medieval church. Both the church and the tower are recorded in the National Heritage List for England as designated Grade II listed buildings. The church is an active Anglican parish church in the diocese of Chester, the archdeaconry of Chester and the deanery of Wallasey.

== History ==
The present building is believed to be the sixth church on the site. The first church is thought to have been built in Saxon times and was probably built of timber and of which there is no trace. Several stones have been found of a Norman structure on the site. It is thought that a new church was built between 1162 and 1182 by William de Waley. This was rebuilt and a tower added during the reigns of Edward I and Edward II. The next rebuilding was in the age of Henry VIII when the tower of 1530 was reconstructed. In 1757, the church was described as ruinous and it was rebuilt.

This structure was accidentally burnt down in 1857, reputedly because the sexton over-stoked the heating boiler, and bacon being cured in the boilerhouse began to drip fat, causing the old prayer mats beneath them to catch fire. Because Wallasey had no fire service, a messenger had to be dispatched to Birkenhead, and by the time the fire brigade arrived the structure was beyond saving. The church was rebuilt as a separate building in 1858–59, leaving the tower as a freestanding edifice. The architects of the present church were W. and J. Hay.

== Architecture ==
=== Exterior ===
The church is built in stone with a slate roof. Its plan consists of a nave with clerestory, north and south aisles under lean-to roofs, a crossing tower with transepts, and a chancel with a north vestry and a south chapel.

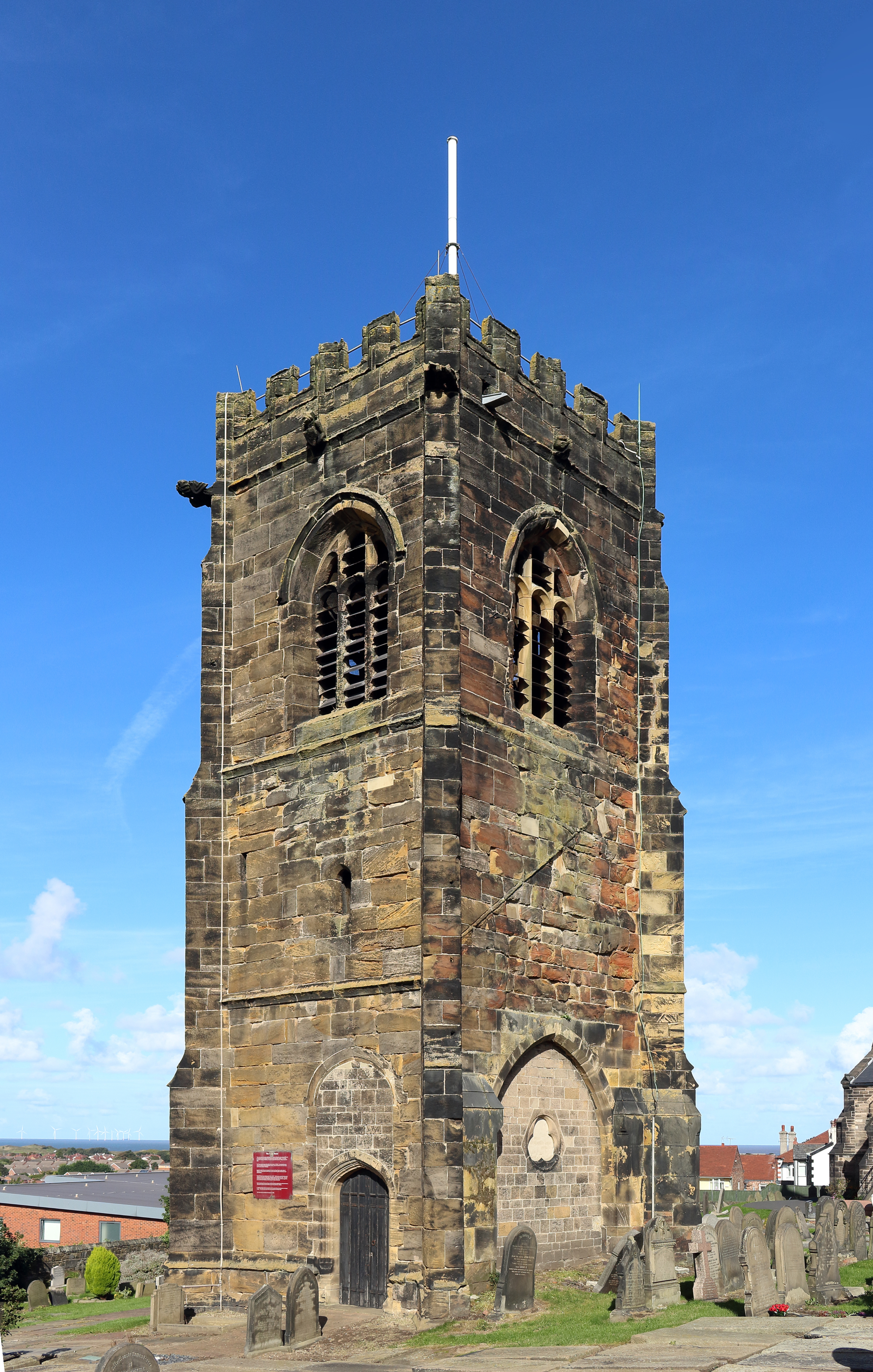
The Tudor tower

The separate tower is built in stone and its lower parts date from the 13th century. It is in three stages with diagonal buttresses. On the north and east faces are blocked arches. The louvred bell openings have three lights and at the top is an embattled parapet with gargoyles.

=== Interior ===
The roof is arch-braced in type. In the chancel is a two-bay organ loft to the north and a two-bay chapel arcade to the south. The wooden reredos has rich carving. The stalls are dated 1897 and are decorated with Arts and Crafts ornament and enamel plaques. There is a ring of six bells cast by John Taylor & Co in 1859. The churchwardens' accounts begin in 1658 and the parish registers in 1574; both were saved in the fire of 1857.

The organ was built in 1861 by Henry Willis to the design of W. T. Best, who was organist at that time, with two manuals. Around 1903 the instrument was entirely reconstructed as a three-manual organ of 39 stops and 15 couplers, designed by Dr James Lyon, who was organist at the time. The work was carried out by W. Johnson of Birkenhead. In 1924 the organ was moved to the north choir aisle above the vestry. The rebuilt organ was designed by George Dixon and built by Rushworth and Dreaper.

== External features ==
The churchyard contains the war grave of a World War II Royal Air Force officer.

== See also ==
- Listed buildings in Wallasey
