= Peter Watson (footballer, born 1935) =

English footballer

Personal information
- Full name: Peter Watson
- Date of birth: 18 March 1935
- Place of birth: Newcastle, England
- Date of death: July 2016 (aged 81)
- Place of death: North Tyneside, England
- Position: Centre forward

Senior career*
Years	Team	Apps	(Gls)
- North Shields
1962–1965	Workington	45	(10)
- Ashington
Total		45	(10)
- * Club domestic league appearances and goals

Peter Watson (18 March 1935 – July 2016) was an English professional footballer who played as a centre forward in the Football League for Workington.

== Career ==
Born in Newcastle, Watson played for North Shields, Workington and Ashington.
