= St. Hilary Roman Catholic Church =

- St. Hilary Roman Catholic Church
- 40.1894°N 80.2668°W
- Location: Washington, Pennsylvania
- Country: United States
- Denomination: Roman Catholic

History
- Founded: 1919

Administration
- Diocese: Pittsburgh

St. Hilary Roman Catholic Church is a church in Washington, Pennsylvania, USA.

It began as a Polish congregation on Henderson Avenue, at the corner of Bruce St and Henderson Avenue (Rt. 18 North) within the Diocese of Pittsburgh.

The church is now part of the "Saint James and Saint Katharine Drexel Catholic Partnership Parishes".

== History of the Congregation and first Pastors ==
The parish was primarily Polish, including their pastor. In July 1919, the Pittsburgh Diocese gave permission to the small group of Roman Catholics to organize a new parish, to be named Saint Hilary. Reverend Victor Majka was assigned. However, services were temporarily conducted in a rented room in a building at the corner of Allison and McAdam Avenues.

Reverend Anthony Spiewak was appointed pastor of Saint Hilary on October 23, 1919. The parishioners rented a home at 1025 Jefferson Ave. that served as the first rectory. In November, 1919, a house was purchased on Henderson Avenue. This was used as the rectory until, March 25, 1958 when it was destroyed by fire. On December 12, 1920, the building of the new church had begun.

The congregants were laborers who worked in heavy labor, especially in nearby coal mines and steel mills. Men in these industries faced the same problems that immigrants also endured in other areas of the county.

== Mass ==
Mass was said in Latin until around 1964, when Vatican II's directives came into effect.

== Description of the old and Grade School ==
The small church, which reeked of age and from thousands of candles burnt down to nubs over the years, sat within a few hundred feet of St. Hilary Roman Catholic Grade School (grades 1 to 8 in the 1960s, K added later).

== New Church edifice ==
The new church was dedicated on May 30, 1967 and the original church was subsequently torn down. It was the newest "modern" architecture of the times, a huge white edifice set at an angle on the lot.

It was in stark contrast to the old church, both inside and out. The old church had a very small entrance with porch on the outside, while the newer building has a wide entrance.

The old church was impressive, with its ornate altar from where the priest said Mass with his back to the congregation. Priests' robes had a brocade-type design on the back, and the Priest's sleeves of his outer garment would open widely as he held the chalice high above his head. On three sides of the church but especially in the front were hand-painted life-size statues.

There were side areas right and left of the main altar in the old church, with racks of votive candle sitting below very large statues. Attached to the front of both racks was a metal coin box; if you had coins (pennies, nickels, dimes), you could light a votive candle (or a couple) using very long sticks. Visitors could put the end of the stick into the flame of a lit candle, then light a new one of their choice. They were supposed to pray for someone if they lit a candle, but many of the young children wanted to light candles even if they had no coins, just to watch the dancing flames.

The new church altar faced front while the old church altar had taken up the entire back wall. The altar area of the new church was no longer separated by the communion rail of the old church.

== Organ locations of the Old and New Church and the Organists ==
In the original (old) church, the organ was up in the balcony at the back of the church. This area had seating for a chorus as well.

A new organ was obtained for the new church. The organ is situated at the front, to the left of the altar area.

Frederick "Fritz" Florian had been the primary organist in both the old and new churches until his death.

For 29 years in the new church, the organist was Louis F. "Lou" Florian, of Washington, PA. He was the son of the prior organist, Frederick "Fritz" Florian and Fritz's wife Elizabeth Rodgers Florian. As his primary occupation, Lou Florian was a sports writer, reporter, city editor and editorial editor for more than 50 years at the Observer-Reporter newspaper which he retired from in 2009. He was past president of the Pittsburgh Chapter of Society of Professional Journalists and was a member of the National Association of Pastoral Musicians. He also served as organist at Immaculate Conception R.C. Church and at numerous other churches in the Washington area. He died on Monday, October 6, 2014 in a single car accident.

== See also ==
- Polish Cathedral style
- Polish Americans
