= Seacombe =

District of Wallasey, England

Coordinates: 53.409°N 3.029°W

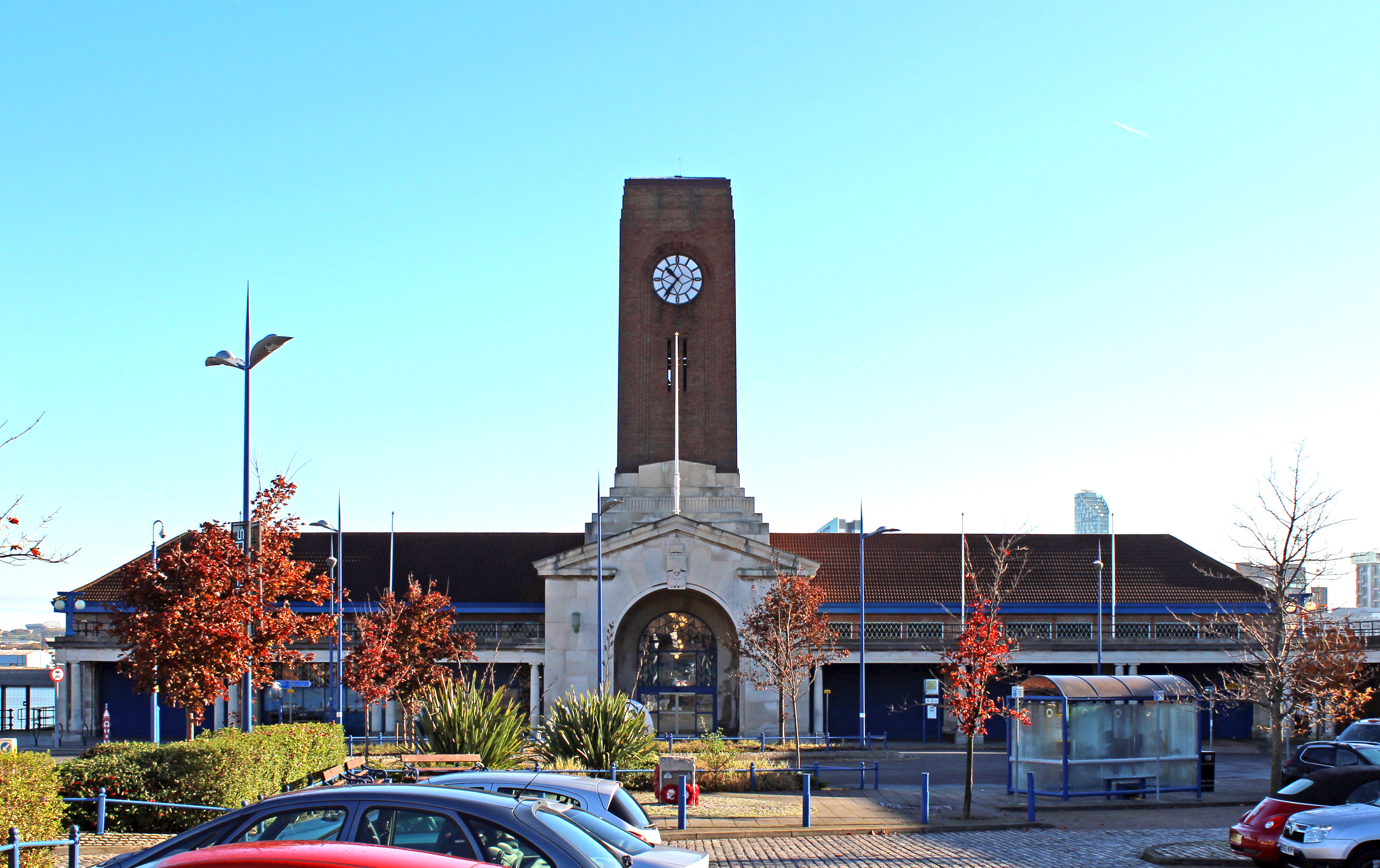
- The front of the Grade II listed ferry terminal

- Location within Merseyside
- Population: 15,387 (2011 CensusWard)
- OS grid reference: SJ316908
  - London: 179 mi (288 km) SE
- Metropolitan borough: Wirral
- Metropolitan county: Merseyside
- Region: North West
- Country: England
- Sovereign state: United Kingdom
- Post town: WALLASEY
- Postcode district: CH44
- Dialling code: 0151
- ISO 3166 code: GB-WRL
- Police: Merseyside
- Fire: Merseyside
- Ambulance: North West
- UK Parliament: Wallasey

Seacombe (/ˈsiːkəm/) is a district of the town of Wallasey, on the Wirral Peninsula, England. Administratively, Seacombe is a ward of the Metropolitan Borough of Wirral in Merseyside. Before local government reorganisation on 1 April 1974, it was part of the County Borough of Wallasey, within the geographical county of Cheshire. At the 2001 Census, the population of Seacombe was 15,158, (7,081 males and 8,077 females), increasing to 15,387 (7,554 males, 7,833 females) at the Census 2011.

== History ==
Seacombe is mentioned in the Domesday Book of 1086 as Seccum.

In 1845 George Turnbull was the civil engineer who designed and built the Seacombe Wall sea defence that helped drain the marshes behind the town.

Seacombe was originally a terminus for the Wirral Railway; however, passenger services ended on 4 January 1960 and all services on the line terminated on 16 June 1963. Much of the line to Seacombe station was used as the approach road to the Kingsway Tunnel.

== Geography ==
Seacombe is situated to the north-east of the Wirral Peninsula, adjoining the River Mersey to the east. Seacombe is less than 4 km (2.5 mi) south-south-east of the Irish Sea at New Brighton and about 11 km (6.8 mi) east-north-east of the Dee Estuary at Caldy. The area is at an elevation of between 0–18 m (0–59 ft) above sea level.

== Notable features ==
Seacombe is dominated by three landmarks. The first of these is one of the terminals for the Mersey Ferry, the legendary "Ferry 'cross the Mersey" described by Gerry & The Pacemakers. The ferry travels in a triangular route between the Seacombe, Woodside and Liverpool Pier Head terminals. The second landmark is the parish church of St Paul. The third is a building housing some of the ventilation systems for the Kingsway Tunnel, a colossal structure which faces the river. It consists of two huge grilles which resemble stereo speakers, and a central concrete flue-like structure. This building has an almost identical counterpart on the Liverpool side of the river.

Seacombe was also home to Spaceport, a space-themed visitor attraction situated near the ferry terminal. Spaceport was opened on 26 July 2005 by Merseytravel Chairman Cllr Mark Dowd. It closed at the end of 2019 due to large financial losses. In November 2022 a new children's attraction, Eureka! Science + Discovery opened at the same site and welcomed 100,000 visitors in its first year.

Wallasey Town Hall is situated in Seacombe. It is a Grade II listed building. During World War I it was used as a military hospital.

Seacombe is also the location of Guinea Gap Baths. It is the oldest swimming pool in the Wirral, with the first swimming club being founded in the 1890s. It was originally filled with sea water, being so close to the River Mersey.

The nearest school to Seacombe Ferry is Riverside Primary School. The school has over 200 pupils and over 25 staff. The school's Latin motto is Da Totem Habes!, translated as Give it all you've got!

== Popular culture ==
The area was immortalised in the title of "Party Seacombe", an instrumental by George Harrison on his Wonderwall Music album.

Michael Portillo lived briefly in Seacombe in 2003 for the BBC TV programme When Michael Portillo became a Single Mum, which saw the former Conservative MP experience life as a single parent (he also worked in the Asda superstore in Wallasey).

== Notable people ==
Falkland Road in Seacombe, which runs from Brighton Street to Liscard Road, is the birthplace of the writer, peace campaigner and philosopher Olaf Stapledon, (1886–1950), author of Last and First Men and Star Maker. Stapledon's birth certificate gives his place of birth as "Poolton (sic) - cum - Seacombe". The prominent Welsh dramatist, literary critic and politician, Saunders Lewis, was born in 61 Falkland Road on 15 October 1893. Marjorie Cottle, pioneer female motorcyclist was born in the town in 1900.
