= Peter Watson (photographer) =

British photographer (born 1952)

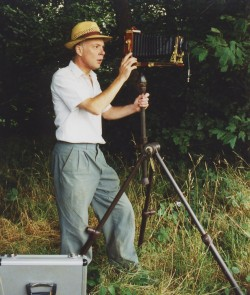
Peter Watson

Peter Watson (born 1952) is a British photographer best known for his large format landscapes of rural Britain.

== Background ==
Born in Wallasey in February 1952 Watson’s photographic career started in his teenage years when he photographed and produced his own black & white prints in an improvised darkroom. They were sold in a local gallery and this early success encouraged him to pursue a career as a photographer. He studied art and graphic design and in 1993 obtained a diploma in photography from the New York Institute of Photography. Watson specialises in landscape, fine art and travel photography using large format Fujifilm with a 5x4 view camera.

Before becoming a full-time professional landscape photographer Watson worked in advertising and commercial photography. He now teaches, holds workshops and lectures. He is the author of several practical photography books and his work has featured in many publications including BBC's Radio Times magazine, Cheshire Life and Zoom magazine and many practical photography magazines. His work is internationally published and collected. In 2008 Watson was chosen as a contributor to the publication Icons of England, produced by The Campaign to Protect Rural England (CPRE). He also runs a photo agency and picture library specialising in images of rural Britain.

== Bibliography ==
- Watson, Peter (2001). Light in the Landscape–a photographer's year. GMC Publications Ltd. ISBN 1-86108-209-6.
- Watson, Peter (2002). The Field Guide to Landscape Photography. GMC Publications Ltd. ISBN 1-86108-285-1.
- Watson, Peter (2005). Capturing the Light. Photographer's Institute Press. ISBN 1-86108-481-1.
- Watson, Peter (2009). Reading the Landscape. Photographer's Institute Press. ISBN 978-1-86108-652-5.
- Watson, Peter (2010). Seasons of Landscape. Photographer's Institute Press. ISBN 978-1-86108-800-0.
- Watson, Peter (2011). The Welsh Coast. Frances Lincoln Limited. ISBN 978-0-7112-3111-5.
- Watson, Peter (2013). Views Across the Landscape Ammonite Press ISBN 978-1-90770-884-8
- Watson, Peter (2014). Composition in the Landscape. Ammonite Press. ISBN 978-1-78145-055-0.
- Watson, Peter (2016). Lessons in Landscape. Ammonite Press. ISBN 978-1-78145-144-1.
- Watson, Peter (2021). Landscape Gallery. Independent Publishing Network. ISBN 978-1-80049-438-1.
