= Wallasey =

Town in Merseyside, England

Coordinates: 53°25′26″N 3°03′11″W

- Town
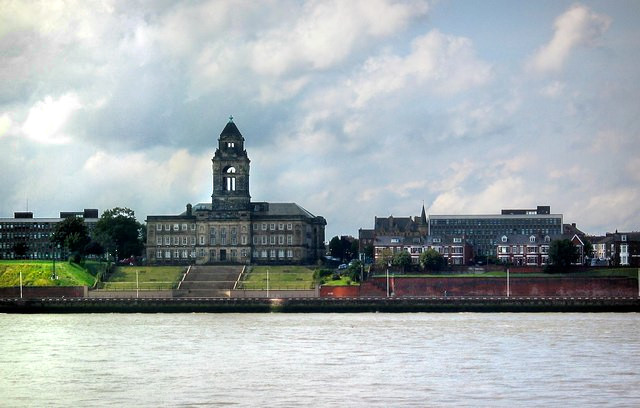
- Wallasey Town Hall

- Location within Merseyside
- Population: 85,610 (Built up area, 2021)
- OS grid reference: SJ293923
  - London: 180 mi (290 km) SE
- Metropolitan borough: Wirral
- Metropolitan county: Merseyside
- Region: North West
- Country: England
- Sovereign state: United Kingdom
- Post town: WALLASEY
- Postcode district: CH44, CH45
- Dialling code: 0151
- ISO 3166 code: GB-WRL
- Police: Merseyside
- Fire: Merseyside
- Ambulance: North West
- UK Parliament: Wallasey

Wallasey (/ˈwɒləsi/) is a town in the Metropolitan Borough of Wirral, Merseyside, England. It is at the mouth of the River Mersey, on the north-eastern corner of the Wirral Peninsula. It lies within the historic county boundaries of Cheshire, and became part of Merseyside in 1974. At the 2021 Census, the built up area as defined by the Office for National Statistics had a population of 85,610.

== History ==
=== Toponymy ===
The name of Wallasey originates from the Old English word Walh, meaning a Briton, a Welshman, which is also the origin of the name Wales. The suffix -ey denotes an island or area of dry land. Originally the higher ground now occupied by Wallasey was separated from the rest of Wirral by the creek known as Wallasey Pool (which later became the docks), the marshy areas of Bidston Moss and Leasowe, and sand dunes along the coast.

=== Early history ===
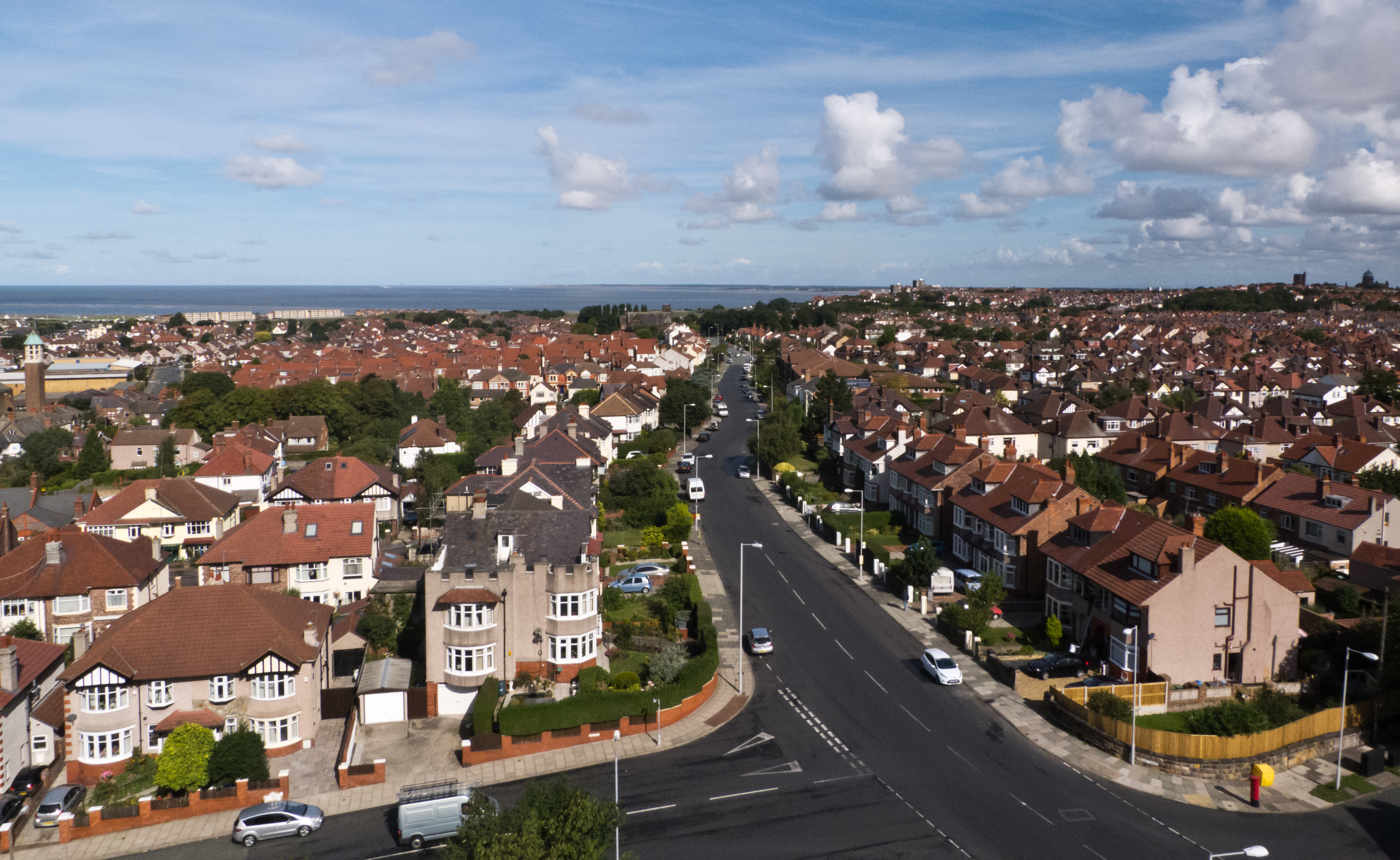
View from the top of St Hilary's Church Tower looking down Claremount Road

The area was sparsely populated before the 19th century and horse races organised for the Earls of Derby on the sands at Leasowe in the 16th and 17th centuries are regarded as forerunners of the modern Derby.

Old maps show that the main centre and parish church (St Hilary's) were located at what is now called Wallasey Village, and there were smaller hamlets at Liscard, Poulton and Seacombe, from where there were occasional ferries across the Mersey. There was also a mill (at Mill Lane), and from the mid-18th century a gunpowder store or magazine at Rock Point, located well away from the built-up areas.

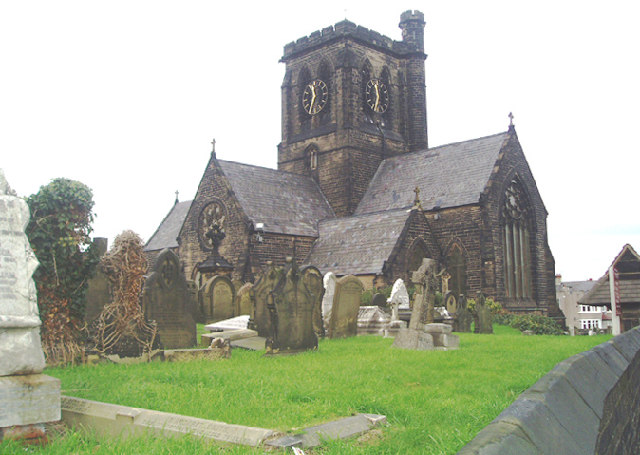
St Hilary's Church

The main activities in the area were farming and fishing. The area also had a reputation for smuggling and “wrecking”, the act of luring ships onto rocks or sandbanks with false lights in order to raid their cargo. Underground cellars and tunnels, which were used to hide cargo pilfered from wrecked ships still exist in the town. As late as 1839, the “Pennsylvania” and two other ships were wrecked off Leasowe in a severe storm, and their cargoes and furnishings were later found distributed among local residents.

=== Early 19th-century development ===
By the early 19th century, the shoreline between Seacombe and Rock Point started to become an attractive area to which affluent Liverpool merchants and sea captains could retire. Development at Egremont began around this time, and gained pace with the introduction of steam ferries across the river. The area also had a defensive role overlooking the growing Port of Liverpool. In 1829, Fort Perch Rock was built, and in 1858 Liscard Battery.

In 1835 Liscard Hall was built by another merchant, Sir John Tobin. Its grounds later became Central Park. His family also developed a “model farm” nearby.

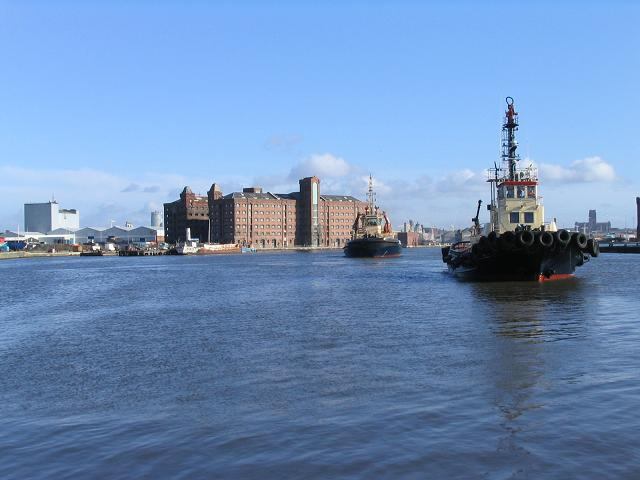
East Float Dock

With the expansion of trade on the Mersey, new docks were constructed between 1842 and 1847 in the Wallasey Pool, and by 1877 the dock system between Wallasey and neighbouring Birkenhead was largely complete. The area around the docks became a centre for engineering industries, many associated with shipbuilding, and other activities including sugar refining and the manufacture of cement and fertilisers. Bidston Dock, the last in the area, was opened in 1933, but was filled in during 2003.

=== Later growth and the 20th century ===
During the latter half of the 19th century New Brighton developed as a popular seaside resort serving Liverpool and the Lancashire industrial towns, and many of the large houses were converted to inexpensive hotels. A pier was opened in the 1860s, and the promenade from Seacombe to New Brighton was built in the 1890s. This served both as a recreational amenity in its own right and to link up the developments along the estuary, and was later extended westwards towards Leasowe. The New Brighton Tower, the tallest in the country, was opened in 1900 but closed in 1919 and dismantled shortly afterwards. However, its ballroom continued as a major venue, hosting numerous concerts in the 1950s and 1960s by local Liverpool bands as well as other international stars.

After 1886, with the opening of the Mersey Railway allowing access via a tunnel to Liverpool, the pace of housing development increased, particularly in the Liscard and Wallasey Village areas. The area now called Wallasey comprises several distinct districts which gradually merged to form a single built-up area during the 19th and early-20th centuries. Further growth continued well into the 20th century and eventually spread into the Leasowe area and beyond to Moreton.

The UK's first guide dog training school, the Guide Dogs for the Blind Association, was founded in the town in 1931. A statue sits outside the Floral Pavilion Theatre to celebrate this.

The Wallasey Golf Club is where club member, Dr Frank Stableford, developed the Stableford system of points scoring. This was first used in competition in 1932.

Because of its docks and proximity to Liverpool, parts of the area suffered aerial bombing in 1940–41. After the Second World War, the popularity of New Brighton as a seaside resort declined dramatically, as did the use of the docks, and Wallasey gradually became more obviously a residential suburb for Liverpool, Birkenhead, and the other towns in the area.

The Beatles played some of their first shows outside Liverpool at the Grosvenor Ballroom in Liscard in 1960, and over the next few years also played several times at the Tower Ballroom in New Brighton. On 12 October 1962, they played there as the support act for Little Richard. Wallasey was also the home base of two other leading Merseybeat groups, the Undertakers featuring Jackie Lomax, and the Pressmen featuring Ritchie Prescott and Phil Kenzie who later became a successful saxophone soloist.

The world's first passenger hovercraft service operated from July 1962 to September 1962 between Leasowe and Rhyl in North Wales. Local MP Ernest Marples was responsible as Minister of Transport (1959–64) for introducing parking meters, yellow lines, and seat belt controls to the UK.

The "Solar Campus" on Leasowe Road was the first building in the world to be heated entirely by solar energy. It was formerly St George's Secondary School, and was completed in 1961 to the designs of Emslie Morgan. The solar panels on this establishment have since been removed due to high costs and has been renamed.

Wallasey was struck by an F1/T3 tornado on 23 November 1981, as part of the record-breaking nationwide tornado outbreak on that day.

== Governance ==
There is one main tier of local government covering Wallasey, at metropolitan borough level: Wirral Council. The council is a member of the Liverpool City Region Combined Authority, which is led by the directly-elected Mayor of the Liverpool City Region. Wallasey gives its name to the Wallasey constituency, which has been held since the 1992 general election by Angela Eagle of the Labour Party.

=== Administrative history ===
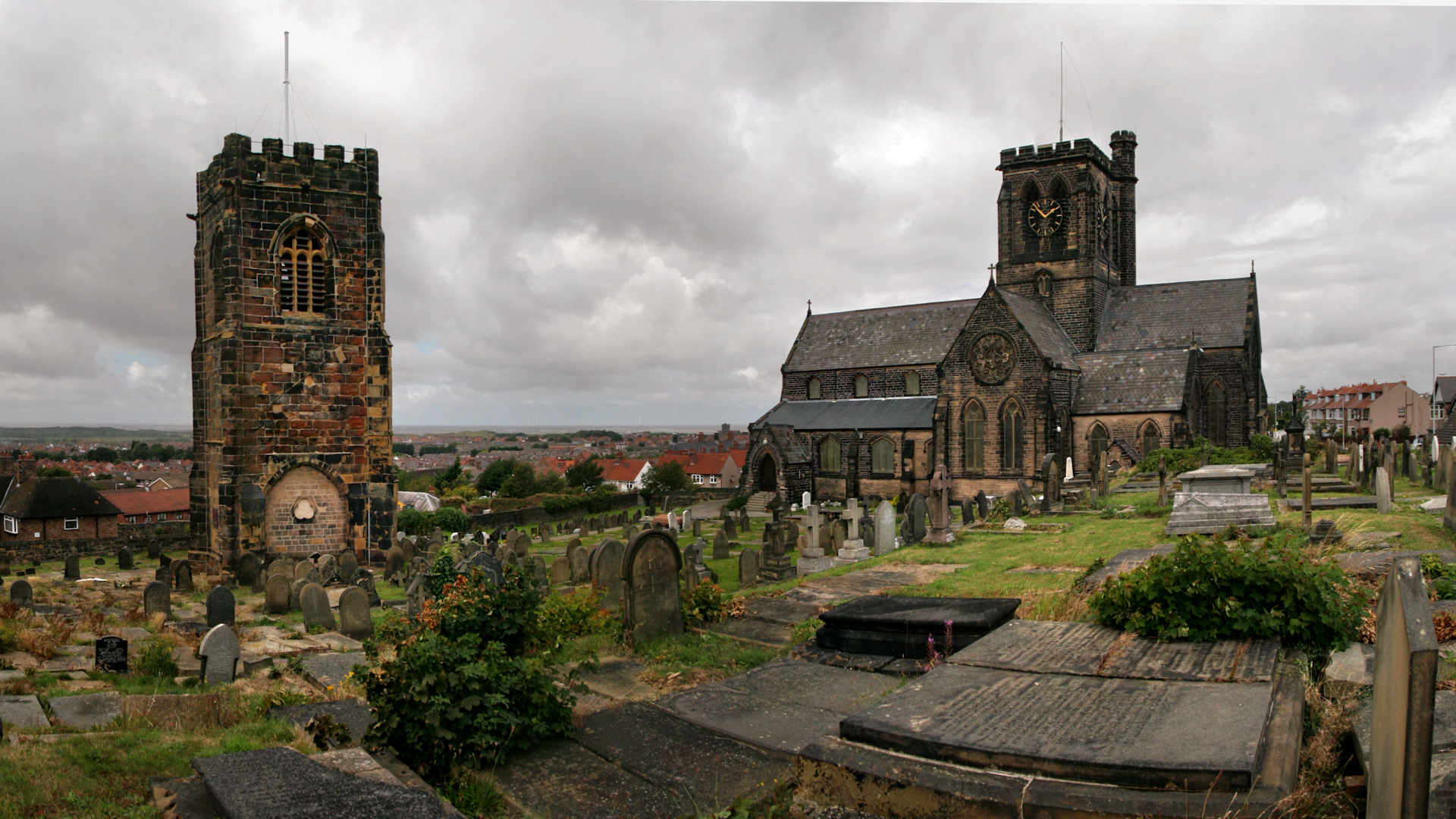
St Hilary's Church: Surviving tower from earlier building destroyed in fire in 1857 and the new church built to replace it

Wallasey was an ancient parish in the Wirral Hundred of Cheshire. The parish was subdivided into three townships: Liscard, Poulton-cum-Seacombe, and a Wallasey township covering the area around Wallasey Village and stretching westwards along the north coast of the peninsula as far as Leasowe Castle. From the 17th century onwards, parishes were gradually given various civil functions under the poor laws, in addition to their original ecclesiastical functions. In some cases, including Wallasey, the civil functions were exercised by each township separately rather than the parish as a whole. In 1866, the legal definition of 'parish' was changed to be the areas used for administering the poor laws, and so the townships also became civil parishes.

To better administer the area in light of development in the early 19th century, including at New Brighton in the Liscard township, a body of improvement commissioners was established in 1845. Their district covered all of the Liscard and Poulton-cum-Seacombe townships and most of the Wallasey township, excluding only the westernmost part of the latter township around Leasowe Castle. The commissioners' district was converted into a local board district in 1853, administered instead by an elected local board. The district was extended in 1877 to include the remaining part of the Wallasey township, and thereafter matched the ancient parish. Such districts were converted into urban districts under the Local Government Act 1894.

Wallasey CB within Cheshire in 1970

Wallasey Urban District was incorporated to become a municipal borough in 1910. The three civil parishes within the borough were united into a single parish of Wallasey matching the borough in 1912. In 1913, the borough was raised to the status of a county borough, taking over county-level functions from Cheshire County Council. Wallasey Borough Council built itself Wallasey Town Hall to serve as its headquarters; the building was officially opened in November 1920. The parish and borough boundaries were expanded in 1928 to take in Moreton and in 1933 to take in Saughall Massie.

The borough of Wallasey was abolished in 1974 under the Local Government Act 1972. The area became part of the Metropolitan Borough of Wirral in the new county of Merseyside.

== Geography ==
Wallasey is situated at the north-east of the Wirral Peninsula, on the western side of the River Mersey and adjoining the Irish Sea. The area is approximately 9.5 km (5.9 mi) east-north-east of the Dee Estuary at Hoylake. Wallasey is at an elevation of between 0–50 m (0–164 ft) above sea level, with the highest point being around St Peter and St Paul's Church in New Brighton.

The area now called Wallasey comprises several distinct districts - Egremont, Liscard, New Brighton, Poulton, Seacombe and Wallasey Village. These gradually merged to form a single built-up area during the 19th and early 20th centuries.

Unlike in most other towns, there is no single Wallasey town centre, although the main shopping area is centrally located at Liscard. Both the parliamentary constituency and the former County Borough of Wallasey also include (or included) Leasowe, Moreton and Saughall Massie, which are now usually regarded as separate settlements.

The town forms part of the wider Birkenhead Urban Area, which in 2011 had a population of 325,000.

=== Liscard ===
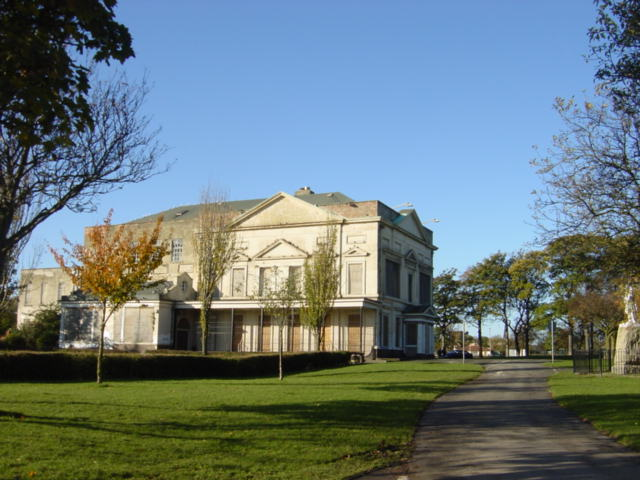
Liscard Hall (demolished)

This contains the main shopping area, with the covered Cherry Tree precinct and an extensive shopping parade outside. Central Park, originally the grounds of Liscard Hall, is the largest park in the town. Much of the area is residential and contains mainly high-density semi-detached housing with some terraces. The gatehouse of the old Liscard Battery remains.

Liscard Hall was destroyed by a fire on 7 July 2008. The damage was so severe, the whole building had to be demolished.

=== Wallasey Village ===
Wallasey Village has a mixture of mostly 20th century semi-detached and detached housing, a shopping street, with a floral roundabout in the centre. St Hilary's Church is an ancient foundation; the old tower is all that remains of a 1530 church building which burned down in 1857. There are two railway stations, Wallasey Village and Wallasey Grove Road. At the north end of Wallasey Village, the main street leads to the promenade and coastal park, and two golf courses. The promenade passes here, running from the 'Gunsite' around to Seacombe, a total of over 7 mi (11 km).

=== New Brighton ===
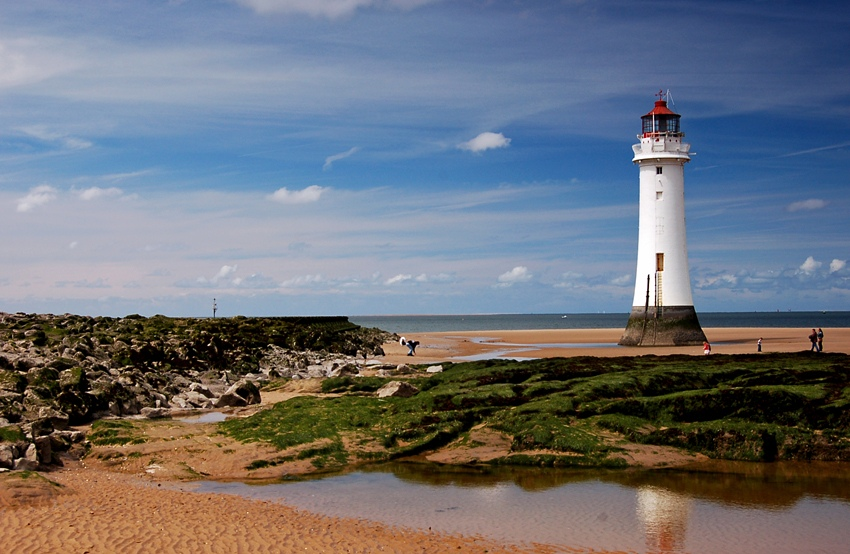
New Brighton Lighthouse on Perch Rock.

New Brighton was a popular seaside resort after the mid-19th century, but declined in popularity after the 1950s. Nevertheless, the marine promenade is part of a walkway and the areas near the sea offer a much improved beach and many leisure activities. The Floral Pavilion plays host to regular productions and national stars such as Ken Dodd, and Vale Park is a public park. Housing here ranges from large villas near the sea to suburban semi-detached homes, and some terraces in parts of the area. New Brighton is served by a railway station of the same name.

=== Poulton ===
Poulton was originally a small fishing and farming hamlet beside the Wallasey Pool (hence its name). It developed with the growth of the docks, mainly as an industrial and terraced housing area.

=== Egremont ===
Egremont developed as an affluent residential area in the early 19th century, and was named by one Captain Askew who built a house in the area in 1835 and named it after his Cumberland birthplace.

=== Seacombe ===
Seacombe, the most southeasterly section of Wallasey, is best known for its Mersey Ferry terminal, with regular ferry boat departures to Pier Head in Liverpool and Woodside in Birkenhead. There is a commuter ferry service direct to Liverpool during peak hours, while for the rest of the day the ferries are geared to serving tourists with a circular cruise visiting Birkenhead Woodside ferry terminal as well. Seacombe is the last remaining of the three ferry terminals which used to connect the Borough of Wallasey, the others being Egremont Ferry and the New Brighton Ferry, which operated from its own pier, running parallel to the New Brighton pleasure pier. Seacombe Ferry is also the starting point of a four-mile (six-kilometre) unbroken promenade, mostly traffic-free, running alongside the River Mersey to Harrison Drive beyond New Brighton.

Local landmarks are St Paul's Church, standing on its own traffic island, and the ventilation tower for the Kingsway Tunnel with its huge extraction fans. As with Poulton, the area developed with housing for the dockworkers and nearby industries, and much of the housing is owned by Magenta Housing or is terraced. The Guinea Gap swimming baths are located between Seacombe and Egremont.

== Education ==
When compared to the national average, the schools of Wallasey slightly underperform on GCSE results. However, they are above the national average on 'A' Level results.

=== Primary schools ===
- Egremont Primary School
- Greenleas Primary School
- Kingsway Primary School
- Liscard Primary School
- Mount Primary School
- New Brighton Primary School
- Park Primary School
- Riverside Primary School
- St Albans Catholic Primary School
- St George's Primary School
- St Joseph's Catholic Primary School
- Saints Peter and Paul Catholic Primary School
- Somerville Primary School

=== Secondary schools ===
- The Kingsway Academy (in Leasowe)
- The Mosslands School
- The Oldershaw Academy
- St Mary's Catholic College
- Weatherhead High School
- St Georges Secondary Modern School

=== Voluntary aided schools ===
- St Alban's Catholic Primary School
- St Joseph's Catholic Primary School
- Saints Peter and Paul Catholic Primary School
- St Mary's Catholic College

== Media ==
=== Television ===
Local news and television programmes are provided by BBC North West and ITV Granada, the local television station TalkLiverpool also broadcasts to the area. Television signals are received from the Winter Hill TV transmitter and the Storeton relay transmitter.

=== Radio ===
Local radio stations are BBC Radio Merseyside, Heart North West, Capital North West & Wales, Smooth North West, Greatest Hits Radio Liverpool & The North West, InDemand Radio and Wirral Wave Radio, a community based station.

=== Newspapers ===
The town is served by the local newspaper, Wirral Globe which publishes on Wednesdays. Liverpool Echo also covers the area.

== Transport ==
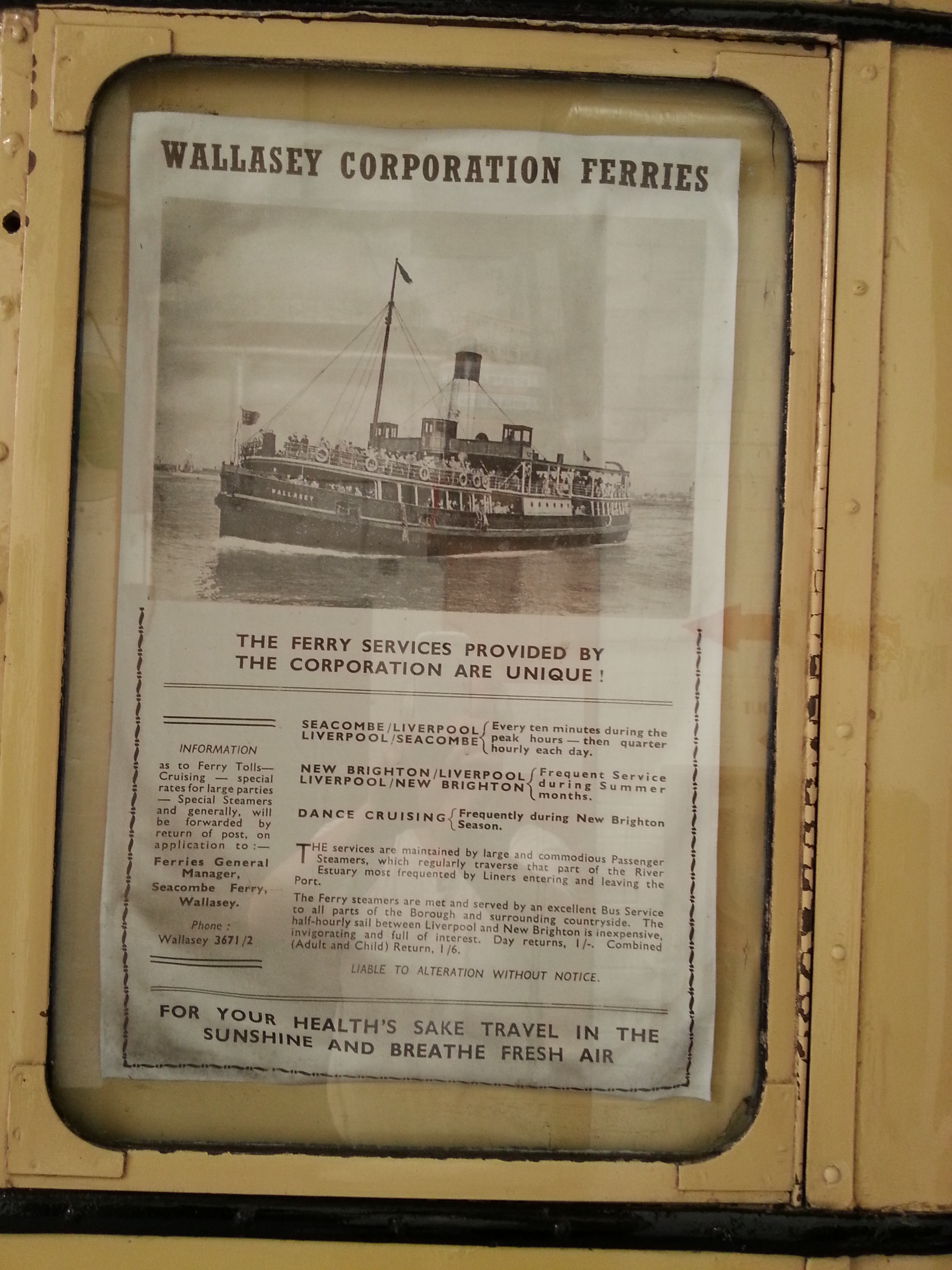
Wallasey Corporation Ferries advert

=== Roads ===
The following roads connect to Wallasey:

- The Kingsway Tunnel was opened by Queen Elizabeth II when it was completed in 1971. Its roadway route via Poulton leads to its entrance in Seacombe, which links Wallasey with the centre of Liverpool.
- The M53 motorway begins in Poulton; it leads south through the centre of the Wirral Peninsula to Chester and into the M56 motorway, which continues to Manchester Airport.
- The North Wallasey Approach Road begins in Wallasey Village and ends in Bidston at junction 1 of the M53.
- Leasowe Road gives access to Leasowe and Moreton to the west, and to Wallasey Village to the east.

=== Railway ===
The town has three railway stations: New Brighton, Wallasey Village and Wallasey Grove Road. Merseyrail operates electric trains to Liverpool Central on the Wirral line every 15 minutes during the day; this reduces to 30 minutes in late evenings and on Sundays.

=== Buses ===
Bus services in the area are operated primarily by Arriva North West, Stagecoach Merseyside and Al's Coaches. Routes connect Wallasey with nearby towns including Birkenhead, Leasowe and Moreton; and Liverpool.

Until 1969, Wallasey had its own corporation bus service; from this date, the operation was taken over by Merseyside Passenger Transport Executive.

== Notable people ==
The following people were from Wallasey:

- Mabel Esther Allan (1915–1998), children's author
- John Baker (1901–1985), structural engineer and inventor of the Morrison indoor shelter
- Shirley Ballas (b. 1960), dancer
- John Barrie (1917–1980), actor
- Ann Bell (b. 1938), actress
- Peter Benson (1943–2018), actor
- Elizabeth Berrington, (b. 1970), actress
- Samuel John "Lamorna" Birch (1869–1955), painter
- The Boo Radleys (formed 1988), Alternative rock band
- Michael Carson (b. 1946), writer
- Jayne Casey (b. 1956), singer (member of Big In Japan)
- Walter McLennan Citrine, Baron Citrine (1887–1983), trade unionist and politician
- Heather Couper (1949–2020), astronomer and broadcaster
- Charles Crichton (1910–1999), film director (The Lavender Hill Mob, A Fish Called Wanda)
- Neil Cross (b. 1972), cricketer
- Dickie Davies (1933–2023), TV sports journalist and presenter
- Louise Delamere (b. 1969), actress
- General Sir Miles Dempsey (1896–1969), commander of the British Second Army during the D-Day landings
- Frank Doel (1908–1968), bookseller in London, whose story is told in 84 Charing Cross Road
- Jenny Frost (b. 1978), singer (member of Atomic Kitten)
- Maxwell Fry, (1899–1987), modernist architect
- Shaun Garnett (b. 1969), Tranmere Rovers footballer and coach
- Sidonie Goossens (1899–2004), harpist
- Leslie Graham (1911–1953), world champion motorcycle racer
- Robbie Green (b. 1974), Professional darts player
- Deryck Guyler (1914–1999), actor and comedian
- Freya Hannan-Mills (b. 2004), actress
- Austin Healey (b. 1973), Leicester and England Rugby Union player
- Annie Higdon (1864–1946) Schoolteacher and social activist
- George Noel Hill (1893–1985), architect
- Paul Hollywood (b. 1966), TV personality, baker
- Geoffrey Hughes (1944–2012), actor
- Rita Hunter (1933–2001), opera singer
- Eric Idle (b. 1943), Monty Python actor and comedian
- John Irvin (1940-2026), film and television director
- Arthur Johnson (1878-1929), Irish born Madrid FC footballer and coach
- Hetty King (1883–1972), music hall performer
- Felice Lascelles (1904–1961), musical comedy actress
- Saunders Lewis (1893–1985), Welsh politician and writer
- Jackie Lomax (1944–2013), singer-songwriter
- Malcolm Lowry (1909–1957), writer (Under the Volcano)
- Wilfrid Lowry (1900–1974), Birkenhead Park FC and England rugby union player
- Frances Macdonald (1914–2002), painter
- Donald McMorran (1904–1965), New Classical architect
- Raymond Moore, (1920–1987), photographer
- Tyler Morton, (b. 2002), Liverpool F.C. footballer
- John Mungo-Park (1918–1941), wartime flying ace
- Tom Murphy (b. 1949), sculptor
- Nigel Olsson (b. 1949), rock drummer (Elton John)
- Vincenzo Pellegrino (b. 1967), actor
- Fred Perry (1909–1995), Wimbledon tennis champion
- Dominic Purcell (b. 1970), actor
- Brian Reece (1913–1962), actor
- Simon Rimmer (b. 1963), chef, TV presenter
- Alan Rouse (1951–1986), mountaineer
- Matthew Smith (b. 1966), games programmer, creator of Manic Miner
- Jay Spearing (b. 1988), Blackpool F.C. footballer
- Olaf Stapledon (1886–1950), science fiction writer and philosopher
- Graham Stark (1922–2013), actor
- Ralph Steadman (b. 1936), artist and cartoonist
- Ray Stubbs (b. 1956), TV sports presenter
- Major Bill Tilman, (1898–1977), mountaineer and explorer
- Victor Tindall (1928–2010), England rugby player
- Peter Watson (b. 1952), photographer
- Aeneas Francon Williams, (1886–1971), minister of the Church of Scotland, missionary, chaplain, writer, poet
- R.J. P. (Bob) Williams (1926–2015), inorganic chemist
- Fortunatus Wright (1712–1757), privateer

== See also ==
- Listed buildings in Wallasey
- Wallasey power station

== Bibliography ==
- Bidston, Carol E. (1980). Wallasey of yesteryear. Birkenhead: Metropolitan Borough of Wirral. ISBN 9780904582017. OCLC 16543770.
- Boumphrey, Ian (2008). Yesterday's Wallasey & New Brighton : including : Moreton Leasowe & Saughall Massie : a pictorial history 1860 to 1960. Prenton: Ian & Marilyn Boumphrey. ISBN 9781899241286. OCLC 652015249.
- Boumphrey, Ian; Boumphrey, Marilyn (1988). Yesterday's Wirral 5 : Wallasey, New Brighton & Moreton. ISBN 9780950725543. OCLC 655904123.
- Carson, P. A.; Garner, C. R. (1990). The silver screens of Wirral : (a history of cinemas in Wallasey, Hoylake, West Kirby and South Wirral). Birkenhead: Countyvise and Metropolitan Borough of Wirral. ISBN 9780904582109. OCLC 24736612.
- Collard, Ian (2009). Wallasey from old photographs. Stroud: Amberley. ISBN 9781848682849. OCLC 403496622.
- Collard, Ian (2009). Wallasey through time. Chalford: Amberley Publishing. ISBN 9781848684256. OCLC 701103642.
- Davies, John V. (1991). Wallasey Golf Club : 1891–1991. Worcestershire: Grant Books. ISBN 9780907186144. OCLC 29219804.
- Dutton, R. (2013). Sixteen Decades In Wallasey. Infodial Ltd. ISBN 9780955655463. OCLC 861542666.
- Jones, Les (2014). Wallasey, the postcard collection. Amberley Publishing. ISBN 9781445636641. OCLC 869344484.
- Maund, T. B. (1969). Local transport in Wallasey. London: Omnibus Society. ISBN 9780901307019. OCLC 54692.
- Maund, T. B. (1995). The Wallasey Bus. Wirral: Ian & Marilyn Boumphrey. ISBN 9781899241057. OCLC 500164440.
- Maund, T. B.; Jenkins, Martin (1987). The tramways of Birkenhead and Wallasey. London: Light Rail Transit Association. ISBN 9780948106033. OCLC 19849706.
- Mortimer, William Williams (1847). The History of the Hundred of Wirral. London: Whittaker & Co. pp. 290–297.
- Rimmer, Ralph (1996). Around Wallasey and New Brighton. Stroud: Chalford. ISBN 9780752401560. OCLC 36760307.
- Wallasey Council (1969). New Brighton, Wallasey : Cheshire's popular family resort. Wallasey: Wallasey Corp. ISBN 9780901649003. OCLC 316232689.
- Wallasey Historical Society (2003). Wallasey at War 1939–45 including Moreton & Leasowe. Prenton: Ian & Marilyn Boumphrey. ISBN 9781899241149. OCLC 751486916.
- Wilson, William (1936). A century of local government in Wallasey 1835–1935. Wallasey: Wallasey Corp. OCLC 15229488.
- Woods, Edward Cuthbert; Brown, Percy Culverwell (1960). The rise and progress of Wallasey, a history of the borough. Wallasey: Wallasey Corp. OCLC 9434957.
