= Wallasey Town Hall =

Municipal building in Wallasey, Merseyside, England

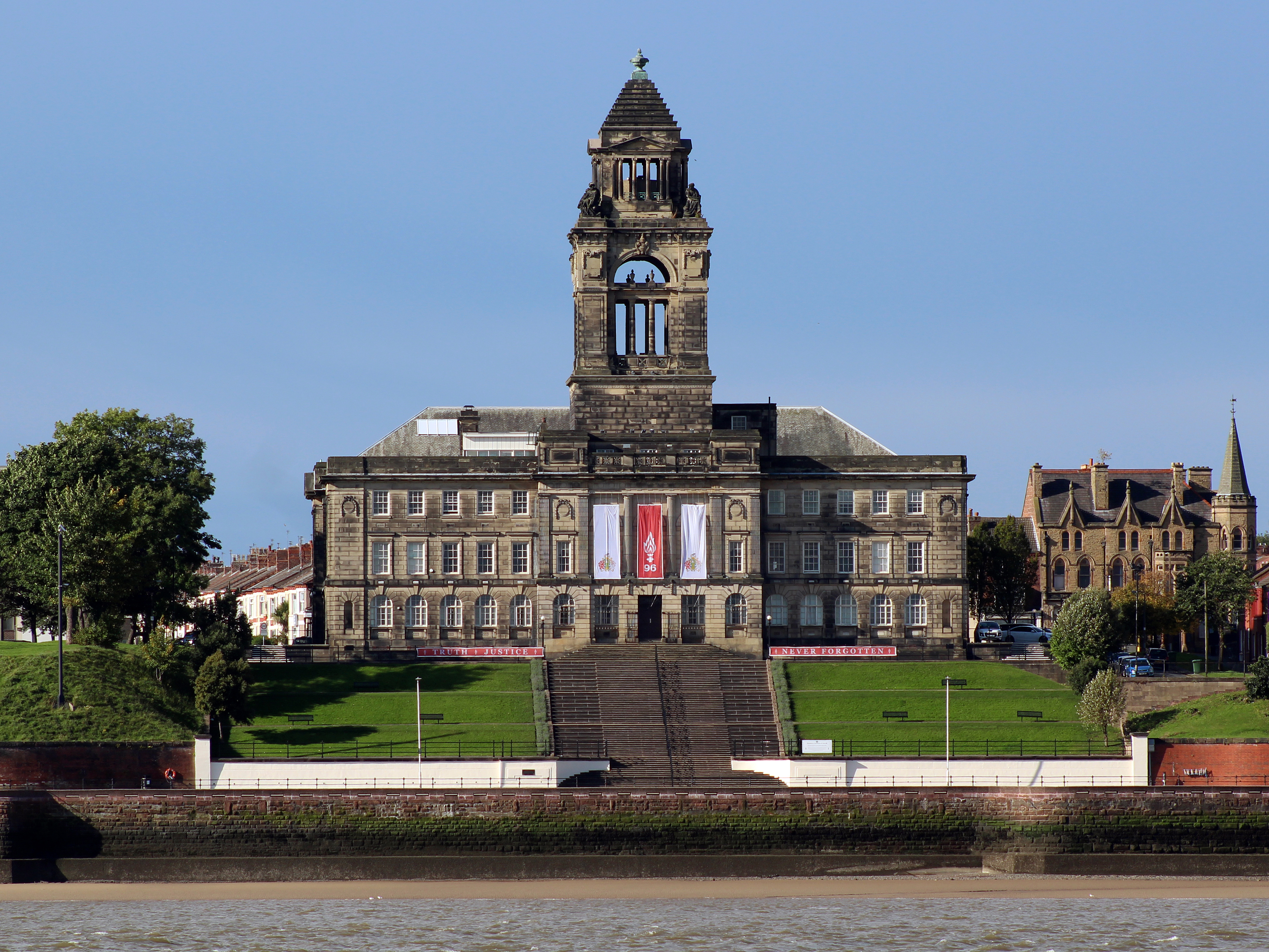
- Wallasey Town Hall

- Shown in Merseyside
- 53.4159°N 3.0229°W
- Location: Wallasey

History
- Built: 1916

Site notes
- Architect: Briggs, Wolstenholme & Thornely
- Architectural style: Neoclassical style

Listed Building – Grade II*
- Official name: Wallasey Town Hall
- Designated: 16 May 1990, upgraded from Grade II to II* on 5 July 2023
- Reference no.: 1258467

Wallasey Town Hall is a municipal building on Brighton Street in Wallasey, Merseyside, England. The town hall, which is the main meeting place of Wirral Council, is a Grade II* listed building.

== History ==
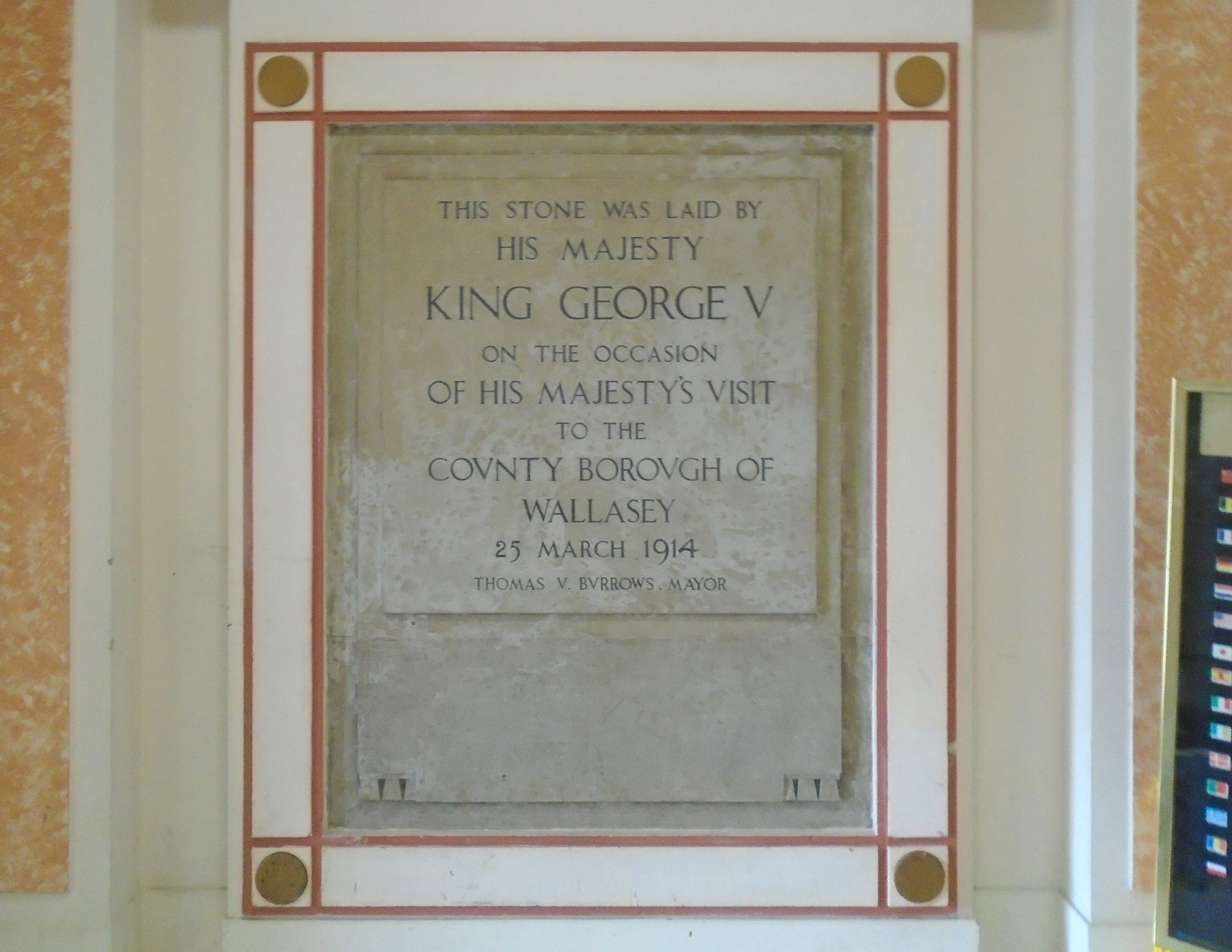
The foundation stone

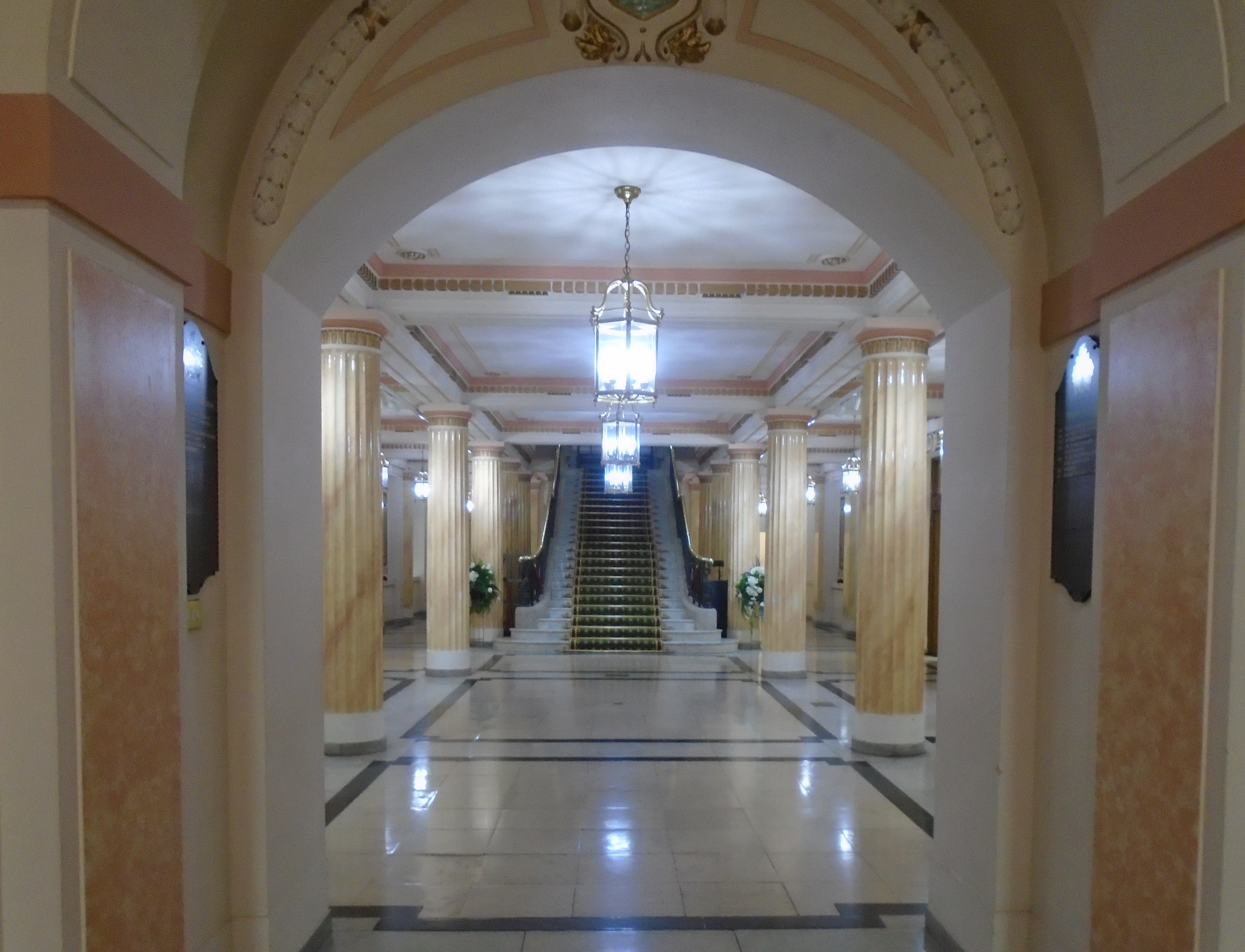
The ground floor atrium

In the early 20th century, Wallasey urban district council, which had been created in 1894, was based in council offices in Church Street. After population growth, largely associated with tourism, Wallasey became a municipal borough in 1910 and then a county borough in 1913. Civic leaders decided to procure a town hall: after a long debate, during which sites at Liscard and in Rake Lane were also considered, the site they selected was one which had been occupied by a mansion known as Northmead House.

The foundation stone for the new building was laid by King George V, who was accompanied by Queen Mary, on 25 March 1914. It was designed by Briggs, Wolstenholme & Thornely in the Neoclassical style and built by Moss and Sons of Loughborough. In 1916, the completed building was placed under the command of the 1st Western General Hospital in Fazakerley and used as a military hospital for soldiers who had been wounded in action during the First World War. After the war it was converted for its intended use as a municipal building and was officially opened as Wallasey Town Hall on 3 November 1920.

The design involved a symmetrical main frontage with seventeen bays facing onto the River Mersey with the blank end bays slighted projected forward; the central section of five bays, which projected forward more prominently, featured a doorway on the ground floor and three tall round-headed sash windows on the first floor. At roof level, there was a three-stage lantern, with large round headed arches spanning the first and second stages; seated figures, designed by William Birnie Rhind and representing peace, courage, prudence and industry, were placed at the corners of the third stage, and a copper urn was installed at its apex. The building, including the lantern, was 180 feet (55 m) high. Internally, the principal rooms were the civic hall, which had a proscenium arch, and the council chamber, which was panelled. An organ designed and manufactured by Henry Willis & Sons, which had originally been installed in City Hall in Dublin, was acquired for the civic hall in 1926.

The civic hall was badly damaged, and its organ destroyed, by bombing on the night of 3 August 1940 during the Second World War and King George VI and Queen Elizabeth visited the town hall to inspect the damage on 6 November 1940. Salvaged parts from the organ were subsequently used to build an organ which was initially installed at the Te Awamutu Methodist Church in Christchurch, New Zealand and later at the Church of St Michael and All Angels in Christchurch, New Zealand. After the war, a plaque, which was flanked by the flags of the United States and the United Kingdom, was installed inside the town hall on the first floor to commemorate the role of the American forces who had been stationed in the town during the war.

Queen Elizabeth II, accompanied by the Duke of Edinburgh, visited the town hall and waved to the crowd from the balcony on 13 July 1957. As the work of the borough council continued to grow, a modern annex was built to the north west of the main building and completed in 1964.

The town hall continued to serve as the headquarters of the county borough of Wallasey and became the local seat of government of the enlarged Wirral Council in 1974. The singer, Sir Paul McCartney, attended the marriage of his niece, Sally Harris, at the town hall on 23 June 2000. The freedom of the Wirral was awarded to the 96 victims of the Hillsborough disaster at a ceremony in the town hall in September 2017.

Works of art in the town hall include a landscape depicting the Liverpool Docks by Henry Melling.

== See also ==
- Listed buildings in Wallasey
