= Metropolitan Borough of Wirral =

Borough of Wirral
- Metropolitan borough
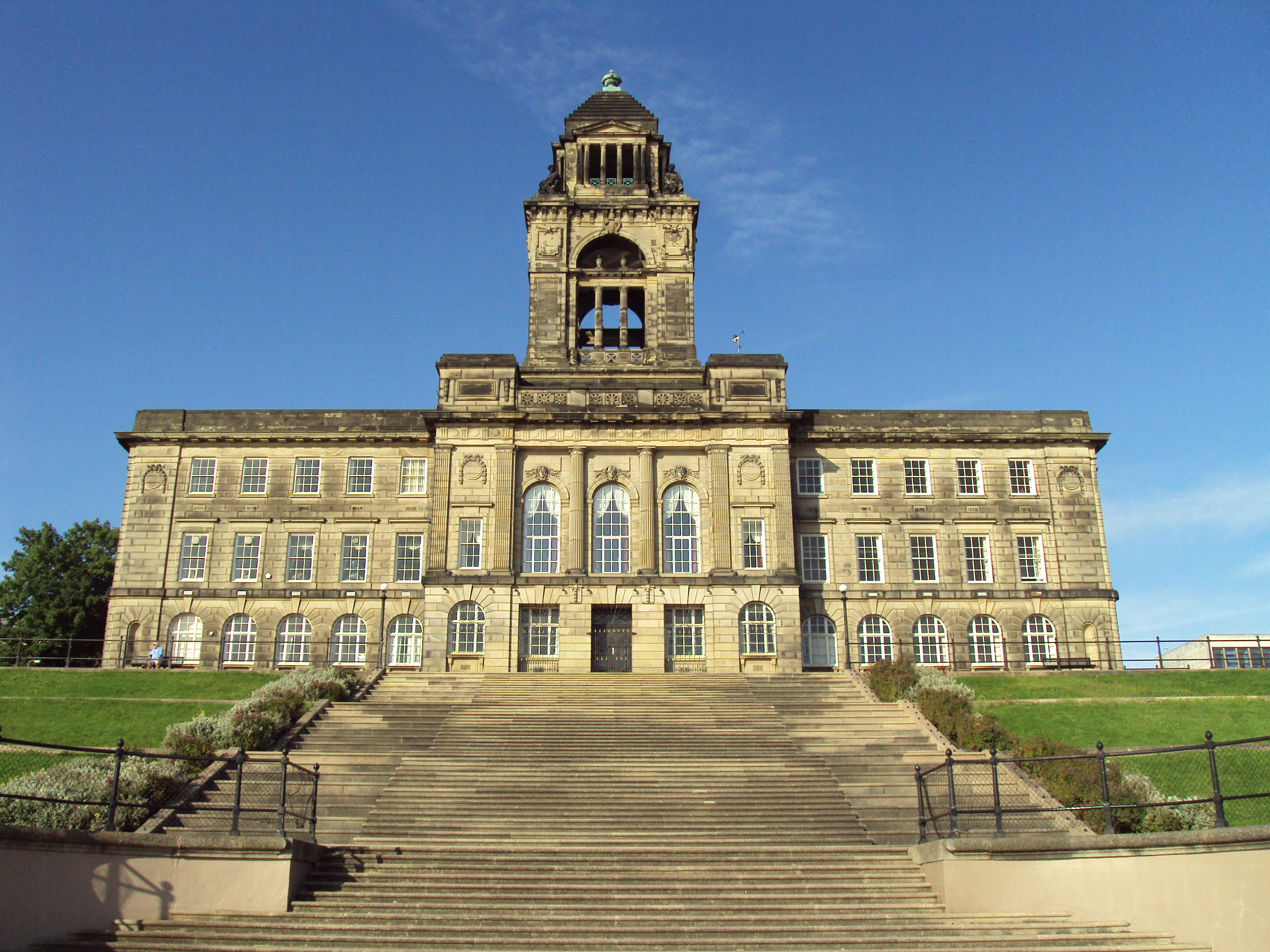
- Wallasey Town Hall

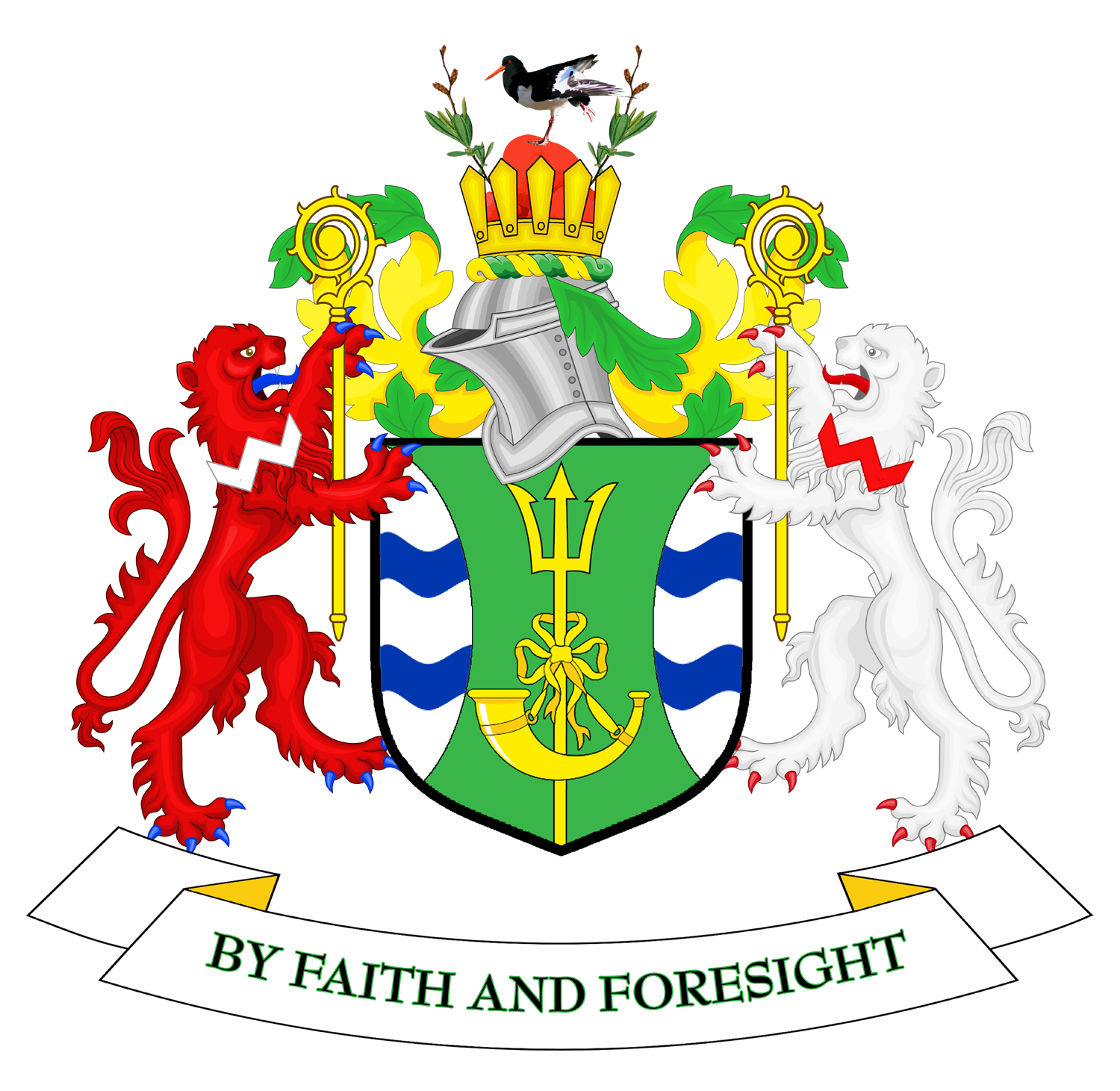
- Coat of arms
- Motto: By faith and foresight
- Wirral shown within Merseyside
- Coordinates: 53.3568°N 3.0635°W
- Sovereign state: United Kingdom
- Country: England
- Region: North West
- Ceremonial county: Merseyside
- City region: Liverpool
- Incorporated: 1 April 1974
- Named for: Wirral Peninsula
- Administrative HQ: Wallasey Town Hall

Government
  - Type: Metropolitan borough
  - Body: Wirral Council
  - Executive: Committee system
  - Control: No overall control
  - Leader: Paula Basnett (L)
  - Civic Mayor: Jerry Williams
  - MPs: 3 MPs: Angela Eagle (L); Alison McGovern (L); Matthew Patrick (L)

Area
  - Total: 253 km^{2} (98 sq mi)
  - Land: 161 km^{2} (62 sq mi)
  - Rank: 161st

Population (2024)
  - Total: 328,873
  - Rank: 40th
  - Density: 2,044/km^{2} (5,290/sq mi)
- Demonyms: Wirralian; Wirralite (colloq.)

Ethnicity (2021)
  - Ethnic groups: List: 95.2% White; 2.3% Asian; 1.5% Mixed; 0.4% Black; 0.6% other

Religion (2021)
  - Religion: List: 55.0% Christianity; 37.3% no religion; 1.0% Islam; 0.4% Hinduism; 0.3% Buddhism; 0.1% Sikhism; 0.1% Judaism; 0.4% other; 5.3% not stated
- Time zone: UTC+0 (GMT)
  - Summer (DST): UTC+1 (BST)
- Postcode areas: CH41–49; CH60–63
- Dialling code: 0151
- ISO 3166 code: GB-WRL
- GSS code: E08000015
- Website: wirral.gov.uk

The Metropolitan Borough of Wirral is a metropolitan borough of Merseyside, in North West England. It has a population of 328,873 (2024), and encompasses 62 square miles (161 km^{2}) of the northern part of the Wirral Peninsula. Major settlements include Birkenhead, Wallasey, Bebington, Heswall, Hoylake and West Kirby. It is one of the six boroughs of the Liverpool City Region, a combined authority area with a population of more than 1.5 million.

Wirral is England's westernmost metropolitan borough, faced by the City of Liverpool to the northeast over the River Mersey.

== Geography ==
Bordering is the River Mersey to the east, the Irish Sea to the north and the River Dee to the west; the borough of Cheshire West and Chester occupies the remainder of the Wirral Peninsula and borders the borough of Wirral to the south.

It is the only non-contiguous part of Merseyside, being located west of the River Mersey and the remainder of the county. It is linked only by the two Mersey Tunnels, the Wirral line of Merseyrail, and the Mersey Ferry.

== History ==
The borough was formed on 1 April 1974, under the Local Government Act 1972, as a merger of the county boroughs of Birkenhead and Wallasey, along with the municipal borough of Bebington and the urban districts of Hoylake and Wirral.

== Governance ==
=== Liverpool City Region Combined Authority ===
The Metropolitan Borough of Wirral is one of the six constituent local government districts of the Liverpool City Region. Since 1 April 2014, some of the borough's responsibilities have been pooled with neighbouring authorities within the metropolitan area and subsumed into the Liverpool City Region Combined Authority.

The combined authority has effectively become the top-tier administrative body for the local governance of the city region and the leader of Wirral Borough Council, along with the five other leaders from neighbouring local government districts, take strategic decisions over economic development, transport, employment and skills, tourism, culture, housing and physical infrastructure.

In 2016, the Cities and Local Government Devolution Act 2016 provided for the direct election of mayors of combined authorities. The Liverpool City Region Combined Authority decided to follow this route and in 2017 Steve Rotheram was elected as the Mayor of the Liverpool City Region (often described as "Metro Mayor"). He was re-elected in 2021 and 2024.

=== Wirral Borough Council composition ===
Wirral Metropolitan Borough Council composition, 2023

The Wirral Independent Network (WIN) had one councillor, Colin Dow, who previously sat as an Independent after having the Labour whip removed in December 2001. He formed WIN before the 2003 election. He failed to win re-election. WIN contested the 2003, 2004, and 2004 elections without success, with under 1% of the vote. The party was founded by Labour members disillusioned with the council administration. Several members went on to join the Green Party and, later, rejoined Labour.

After the local elections in 2008, the Metropolitan Borough of Wirral was governed by a Labour Party/Liberal Democrat coalition, the second and third largest parties on the council respectively. Steve Foulkes of Labour was leader of the council. The Conservative Party was the largest party represented, and was in opposition with its leader Jeff Green being leader of the opposition.

After the local elections in 2010, the Metropolitan Borough of Wirral was governed by a Conservative Party/Liberal Democrat coalition, which reflected the coalition at national level. The Conservative Party, continuing to be the largest party represented on the council increased its number of seats by 2 to 27 and has now entered into coalition government with the Liberal Democrats as the leading coalition partner with the leader of the Conservatives, Jeff Green, becoming the new leader of the council. The Labour Party increased its representation on the council by 4 to 24 and remained the second largest party though they are now in opposition with their leader, Steve Foulkes, who was leader of the council now leader of the opposition. The Liberal Democrats lost 4 seats decreasing their tally to 15 remaining the third largest party on the council but continuing to participate in the governing of the council as the junior coalition partner to the Conservatives. The one independent represented on the council lost their seat.

After the local elections in 2011, the Metropolitan Borough of Wirral was governed by a minority Labour Party administration. Foulkes was leader of the council with Phil Davies as deputy leader. The Liberal Democrats lost a councillor who switched to Labour, Steve Niblock shortly after the elections. There are now no independents on Wirral Council. Labour have 36 seats, Conservatives have 23 and the Liberal Democrats 7.

In February 2012, the Conservatives and Liberal Democrats defeated the Labour administration in a motion of no confidence and the two parties governed again until the May election. Labour made gains in May 2012, gaining majority control of the council for the first time since local elections in 2002 saw Labour become a minority.

In 2014, the Green Party gained their first seat on the council, defeating Labour in their typically safe seat of Birkenhead and Tranmere. They retained it in 2018 with an increased vote share, albeit with a reduced majority. In the 2023 local elections, the Green Party won 13 seats. The current leader of the council is Paula Basnett (Labour).

== Economy ==
This is a chart of trend of regional gross value added of Wirral at current basic prices published (pp. 240–253) by Office for National Statistics with figures in millions of pounds.

Year	Regional gross value added^{1}	Agriculture^{2}	Industry^{3}	Services^{4}
1995	2,089	10	674	1,405
2000	2,609	5	814	1,789
2003	3,020	9	755	2,256

- ^1 Components may not sum to totals due to rounding
- ^2 includes hunting and forestry
- ^3 includes energy and construction
- ^4 includes financial intermediation services indirectly measured

Plans were announced in 2006 for a £4.5bn development around the docklands to be called Wirral Waters. The development is a mixture of industrial, office, residential and leisure facilities. Planning permission was granted in 2010 and work began on the site in 2011, with development work potentially lasting for 30 years.

== Education ==
When the borough was set up in 1974, it inherited comprehensive systems from the former County Boroughs of Birkenhead and Wallasey. In the part of Wirral formerly administered by Cheshire County Council, it inherited a selective system of grammar and secondary modern non-Roman Catholic schools and a comprehensive Roman Catholic school (St John Plessington Catholic College).

Until the implementation of the Education Reform Act 1988, education in Wirral continued to be organised in four areas; Birkenhead, Wallasey and the former parts of Cheshire known for education purposes as "Bebington" and "Deeside". However this Act introduced "open enrolment", allowing parents from anywhere in the borough, and outside it, to apply for a place for their child at any secondary school. As a result, significant numbers of pupils from the former "comprehensive areas" attend schools in the former "selective areas" and vice versa. The distinction between different types of school was to an extent masked, as all secondary modern and most comprehensive schools were named "High School". As a further result of this Act, St Anselm's College and Upton Hall School, both within the Birkenhead education area, became the only independent schools in the country to become state funded grant-maintained schools, retaining selective admissions policies to become Roman Catholic grammar schools.

A further change came as a result of the School Standards and Framework Act 1998, which effectively changed secondary modern schools into comprehensives as schools were no longer permitted to select by examination failure. In summary, Wirral now has a state secondary sector made up of 16 comprehensive schools (of which two are Roman Catholic) and 6 grammar schools (of which two are Roman Catholic).

== Political makeup ==
Year	Party					Ref.
Year	CON	GRN	LAB	LIB	OTH	Ref.
Year	CON	GRN	LAB	LDM	OTH	Ref.
1973	29	0	24	13	0	
1974	29	0	24	13	0	
1975	36	0	21	9	0	
1975	37	0	21	8	0	
1976	42	0	18	6	0	
1977	42	0	18	6	0	
1978	45	0	16	5	0	
1979	40	0	20	6	0	
1980	37	0	23	6	0	
1981	37	0	23	6	0	
1982	35	0	25	6	0	
1983	34	0	24	8	0	
1984	34	0	24	8	0	
1985	34	0	24	8	0	
1986	30	0	26	10	0	
1987	29	0	27	10	0	
1988	24	0	32	10	0	
1988	24	0	29	10	3	
1989	24	0	29	10	3	
1990	23	0	33	7	3	
1990	23	0	33	8	2	
1991	24	0	34	7	1	
1992	29	0	31	6	0	
1993	29	0	31	6	0	
1994	28	0	30	8	0	
1995	22	0	36	8	0	
1996	16	0	41	9	0	
1997	16	0	41	9	0	
1998	16	0	41	8	1	
1999	16	0	42	8	0	
1999	17	0	39	10	0	
2000	20	0	34	12	0	
2001	20	0	34	12	0	
2001	20	0	33	12	1	
2002	20	0	32	12	2	
2002	20	0	31	14	1	
2003	23	0	26	16	1	
2004	21	0	26	19	0	
2004	20	0	26	19	1	
2005	21	0	26	18	1	
2006	21	0	26	19	0	
2007	21	0	25	20	0	
2007	21	0	25	19	1	
2007	20	0	25	29	2	
2008	24	0	21	20	1	
2009	25	0	20	20	1	
2010	27	0	24	15	0	
2011	27	0	29	10	0	
2011	27	0	30	9	0	
2012	22	0	37	7	0	
2013	23	0	36	7	0	
2013	22	0	37	7	0	
2013	22	0	37	6	1	
2014	21	1	38	6	0	
2015	21	1	39	5	0	
2016	21	1	38	5	1	
2016	21	1	39	5	0	
2017	21	1	39	5	0	
2018	21	1	39	5	0	
2018	21	1	38	5	1	
2018	21	1	37	5	2	
2019	22	3	32	6	3	
2023	17	13	30	6	0	

== Members of Parliament ==
Constituency	Member of Parliament	Political party	Year first elected
Wallasey	Angela Eagle	Labour Party	1992
Birkenhead	Alison McGovern	Labour Party	2010 (Note: First elected to Parliament as MP for Wirral South in 2010, this constituency was abolished in 2024 and McGovern stood and was elected MP for Birkenhead)
Wirral West	Matthew Patrick	Labour Party	2024

== Places of interest ==
Wirral Council maintains five designated Local Nature Reserves: Bidston Moss, Dibbinsdale, Heswall Dales, Hilbre Island and Thurstaston Common. It also operates the Merseyside part of Wirral Country Park, which was the first country park to be established in Britain.

== Twin towns – sister cities ==
The Metropolitan Borough of Wirral is twinned or has sister city relationships with:

- Lorient, France
- Gennevilliers, France
- Midland, Texas, United States
- Reno, Nevada, United States
- Sibiu, Romania

== Freedom of the Borough ==
The following people, military units, organisations and groups have received the Freedom of the Borough of Wirral.

=== Individuals ===
- Lieutenant Commander Ian Edward Fraser: 1993
- Joseph Lynch: 1996
- Raymond Holmes: 2005
- Reverend David Urquhart: 2006
- Michael Chan, Baron Chan: 2006
- Stephen Maddox: 2010
- Police Constable David Phillips: 21 May 2016 (awarded posthumously)
- Frank Field, Baron Field of Birkenhead: 16 February 2022
- Paul O'Grady: 8 June 2023 (awarded posthumously)
- Glenda Jackson: 9 October 2023 (awarded posthumously)
- Dame Patricia Routledge: 17 January 2025

=== Military units ===
- The Cheshire Regiment: 1996
- The Royal Marines: 1998
- 1st Battalion The Mercian Regiment: 2009
- 234 (Wirral) Transport Squadron, RLC (Volunteers): 18 February 2012
- 107 (Lancashire and Cheshire) Field Squadron (Volunteers): 18 February 2012
- HMS Astute, RN: 6 July 2015
- Wallasey Sea Cadet Corps: 6 July 2015

=== Organisations and groups ===
- The 96 people killed at the Hillsborough disaster: 15 September 2017
- Andrew Devine (97th Hillsborough Victim): 21 March 2021
