= Royal Daffodil =

Royal Daffodil may refer to the following ships:

- SS Royal Daffodil, originally a Mersey ferry built in 1906 with the name Daffodil, which gained the "Royal" prefix after the Zeebrugge Raid in 1918
- SS Royal Daffodil II, a Mersey ferry built in 1934, renamed the St. Hilary in 1957 and broken up in 1962.
- MV Royal Daffodil (1939), a cross-channel excursion boat built in 1939 and scrapped in 1967
- MV Royal Daffodil II, a Mersey Ferry built in 1958, sold for service in the Eastern Mediterranean in 1977 and lost at sea in 2007
- MV Royal Daffodil (1962), a Mersey ferry built as MV Overchurch in 1962 and renamed in 1998
- MV Royal Daffodil (2025), a Mersey ferry launched in 2025

== See also ==
- Daffodil (disambiguation)
