= Daffodil (disambiguation) =

Daffodil is the common name for the plant genus Narcissus and any of its individual species.

Daffodil, Daffodils, The Daffodils, etc. may refer to:

== Art, entertainment, and media ==
- Daffodils (film), a 2019 film set in New Zealand
- "Daffodils" (poem), alternative title for Wordsworth's "I Wandered Lonely as a Cloud"
- Daffodils (song), a song by Mark Ronson
- "Daffodil", a song by Florence + the Machine from the 2022 album Dance Fever
- "Daffodil", a song by Jamie xx from the 2024 album In Waves
- Daffodil, a rabbit on US children's TV series Clifford's Puppy Days
- Doctor Daffodil, character in the US animated series Pet Alien
- Daffodil Records (disambiguation)
- The Daffodill And The Eagle, the title of a composition performed by Shakti (band) & John McLaughlin (musician) on the record "Natural Ekements"

== Educational institutions ==
- Daffodil International University, a private research university located in Dhaka, Bangladesh

== Events ==
- The Daffodil Festival, regional festival and parade held in Pierce County, Washington, USA
- Daffodil Day, a fundraising event used by various cancer charities, including Marie Curie Cancer Care

== Ships ==
- HMS Daffodil (1940), British train ferry used by navy in World War II
- SS Daffodil, a Mersey Ferry that took part in the Zeebrugge Raid and was, in consequence, renamed Royal Daffodil
- USS Daffodil (1862), US navy sidewheel steamer

== Other uses ==
- Narcissus pseudonarcissus, the wild daffodil (Lent lily)
- DAF Daffodil, a small family car
- Daffodil or "daffy", a derogatory slang term for a homosexual or cross-dresser
- Daffodil, an American internet celebrity deer nicknamed "Dillie"

== See also ==
- Daffydils
- Royal Daffodil (disambiguation)
