= Mersey Ferry =

Passenger boat service in Liverpool, UK

Coordinates: 53.416°N 3.025°W

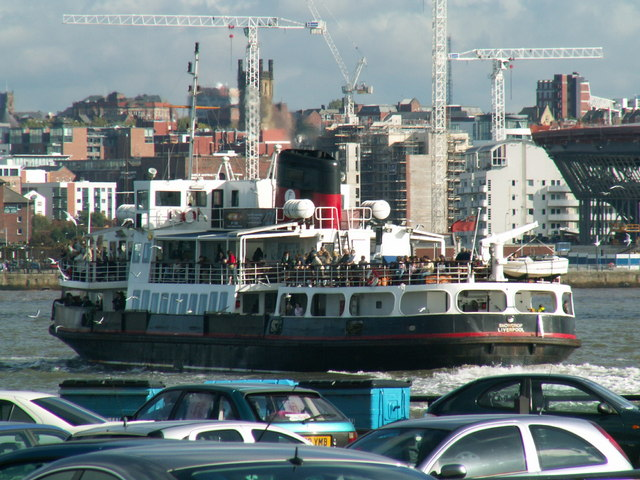
MV Snowdrop of Mersey Ferries in Birkenhead colours

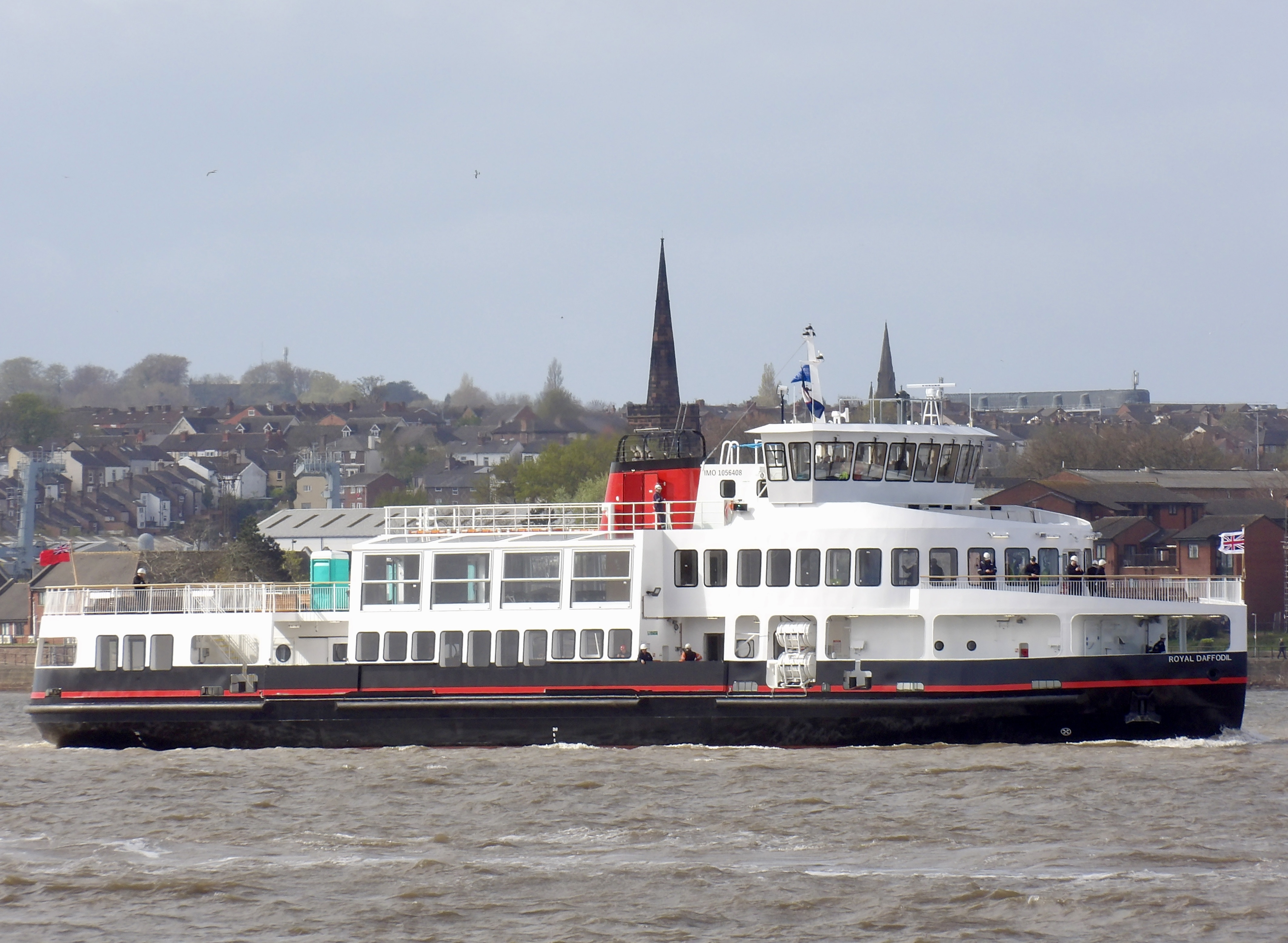
The new MV Royal Daffodil during sea trials in 2026

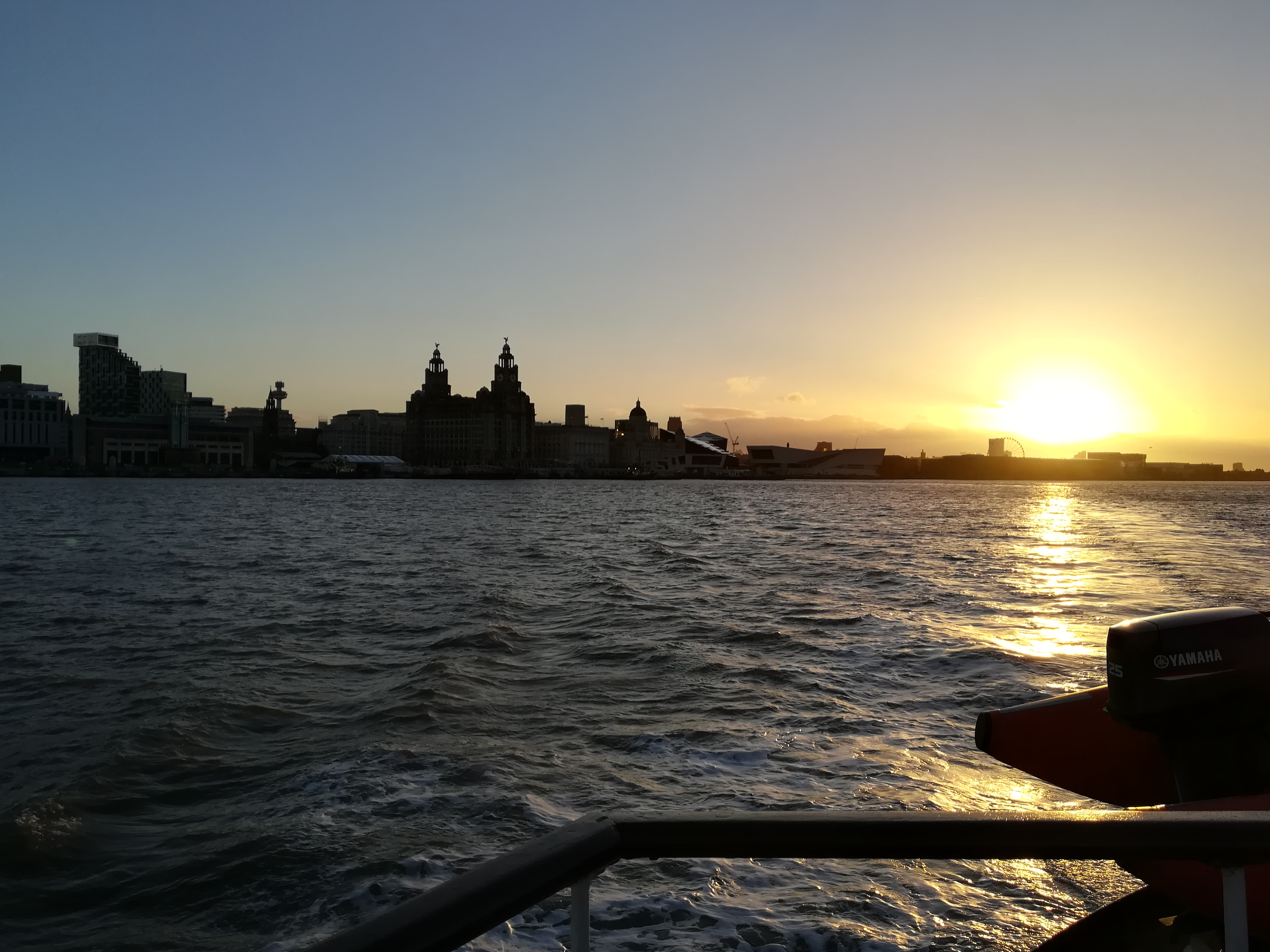
Liverpool waterfront viewed from the stern of a ferry

The Mersey Ferry is a ferry service operating on the River Mersey in northwest England, between Liverpool to the east and Birkenhead and Wallasey on the Wirral Peninsula to the west. Ferries have been used on this route since at least the 12th century and continue to be popular for both local people and visitors. In addition to cross-river ferrying, the vessels provide charter cruises and the Manchester Ship Canal cruise.

The service is operated by Merseytravel, under the "Mersey Ferries" brand. The current fleet consists of two vessels: Snowdrop (formerly Woodchurch) and Royal Daffodil, which entered service in 2026 to replace the now withdrawn Royal Iris of the Mersey (ex-Mountwood).

== History ==
=== Medieval ferries ===
In about 1150, the Benedictine Priory at Birkenhead was established. The monks used to charge a small fare to row passengers across the river. At this time, the Mersey was considerably wider with sand dunes and marshes to the north leading up to Ainsdale beach and sandstone cliffs and shorelines to the south near Otterspool. The only suitable landing point for the ferry was in the Pool, near the site of the present Merseyside Police headquarters. Weather often stopped crossings and passengers were delayed for days, taking shelter at the priory.

In 1317, a royal licence was issued, granting permission to the Priory to build lodging houses for men crossing the river at Woodside. King Edward II visited Liverpool in 1323, and the royal accounts show that he used local ferrymen to sail up the river to Ince. In 1330, his son Edward III granted a charter to the Priory and its successors forever: "the right of ferry there... for men, horses and goods, with leave to charge reasonable tolls". At the time, there was only a small hamlet at Birkenhead, and a slightly larger village at Liverpool. The Chester Indictments record criminal activities on the Mersey ferries in the 14th and early 15th centuries. In 1355, Richard, son of Simon de Becheton, was murdered on the ferry; the murderers escaped and took refuge at Shotwick. In 1365, it was recorded that there were four ferryboats operating without a licence, from Bromborough and Eastham. In 1414, William de Stanley, the servant of John Talbot, later Earl of Shrewsbury, was on the ferry between Birkenhead and Liverpool when about 200 men assaulted him and stole his bay horse valued at £5 (current value - over £2,800), a bow and 14 arrows valued at 3s 4d (current value - over £95) and a barge valued at £10 (current value - over £5,700). The thieves were fined.

A licence was issued in 1357 to the Poole family by Edward, the Black Prince, for a ferry from Eastham. The licence then passed to the Abbey of St Werburgh, in Chester, and became known as Job's Ferry. Early ferries also existed across the Mersey further upstream, at Ince and at Runcorn.

=== From the 16th to the 18th century ===
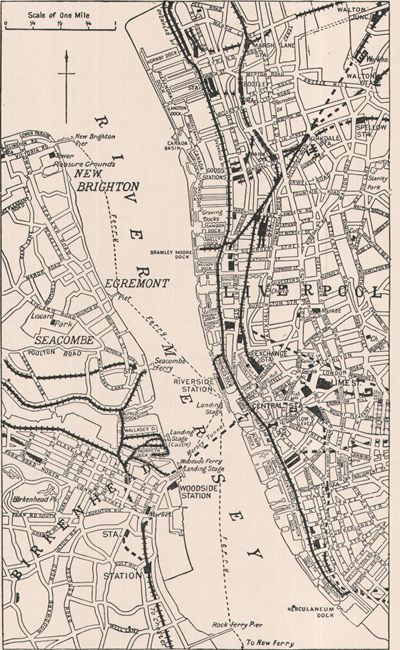
Map from 1911 Encyclopædia Britannica, showing ferry routes

The monks of Birkenhead Priory operated a ferry service until the Dissolution of the Monasteries and the priory's destruction by King Henry VIII's troops in 1536. Ownership reverted to the Crown, and in 1544 the ferry rights as well as the Priory properties were bought by Ralph Worsley of Lancashire for £586. 11s. 6d (the current value is almost £205,000). The rights later passed to the Molyneux family. By 1541 William Bromley had the licence for ferries at Seacombe, and in 1586, Queen Elizabeth I granted John Poole of Sutton the rights at Tranmere.

During this period, the private owners began to use fully rigged sailing ships. The use of sailing ships meant that bigger vessels could be employed, but in reality, these boats were even more at the bidding of the weather. The Mersey is famed for its thick fogs, and during these times during winter there was little wind and ferries could not operate. The frequency depended on demand and the weather.

By the 18th century, the commercial expansion of Liverpool and the increase in stage coach traffic from Chester spurred the growth of the transportation of passengers and goods across the river. Ferry services from Rock House on the Wirral – that is, Rock Ferry – were first recorded in 1709. By 1753 the Cheshire side of the Mersey had at least five ferry houses at Ince, Eastham, the Rock, Woodside and Seacombe. The service from New Ferry to Liverpool was first mentioned in 1774.

=== Steam ferries ===
The first steamship to operate on the Mersey was the Elizabeth, a wooden paddle steamer, which was introduced in 1815 to operate between Liverpool and Runcorn. There was considerable debate as to the best way of boarding a ferry vessel. For the steam ferry Etna, which entered service at Tranmere on 17 April 1817, the idea of extension stages was mooted. These were long piers that were mounted on wheels and, by using a steam engine, could be wheeled in and out depending on the level of the tide.

At Woodside, a small slipway was built on the beach to allow the boats to berth, and in 1822 the paddle steamer Royal Mail began commercial operation between Liverpool and Woodside. The town of Birkenhead was just starting to develop at this point. In 1820, the Birkenhead Ferry began operating from a new site just to the south; this closed in 1870. The Woodside, North Birkenhead and Liverpool Steam Ferry Company was formed in 1835, and the slipway at Woodside was widened and constructed as a stone pier. In 1838, the Monks Ferry Company began operating rival ferries from a new stone slip and hotel about 400 metres south of Woodside, but this service closed in 1878.

From about 1830, steam ferries also operated from the new resort developed by James Atherton at New Brighton, and from nearby Egremont. Steam ferries also began operating from Eastham.

By the 1840s, Birkenhead was developing into a busy new town. The railway to Chester had opened, the town was growing quickly, and the docks were under construction. There were also competing ferry services and disputes over the rights granted to the monks, and there was a need to improve the facilities at Woodside. In the early 1840s, the old slipway was replaced with a new stone pier with a small lighthouse at the end. However, this soon became inadequate.

In 1847, the first floating landing stage, which rose and fell with the tide so that boats could dock at any time, was opened at Liverpool. The first portion, known as the Georges' landing stage, was designed by William Cubitt and was 500 feet long. It was rebuilt and extended in 1874.

=== Corporation years ===
Birkenhead Improvement (Woodside Ferry) Act 1842
- Act of Parliament
- Parliament of the United Kingdom
- Long title: An Act to authorize the Purchase of a certain Ferry called "Woodside Ferry" by the Commissioners for the Improvement of the Township or Chapelry of Birkenhead in the County Palatine of Chester; and for amending the Improvement Acts for the said Township.
- Citation: 5 & 6 Vict. c. v

Dates
- Royal assent: 22 April 1842

Other legislation
- Repealed by: Birkenhead Corporation Act 1881

Status: Repealed

Text of statute as originally enacted

Until the establishment of the Mersey Railway in 1886, the ferries were the only means of crossing the river, and so all of the routes were heavily used. All of the ferry routes were owned by private interests before coming under municipal ownership in the mid-19th century. The Woodside ferry was taken over by the Birkenhead Commissioners in 1858 and, in 1861, the Wallasey Local Board took over the ferry services at Seacombe, Egremont and New Brighton. At Woodside, land between the Woodside Hotel and the end of the old pier was reclaimed, and in 1861 the floating landing stage was opened. The pontoons were towed into position, moored by chains originally made for the SS Great Eastern, and linked to the mainland by two double bridges.

The Cheshire, the first passenger ferry steamer to have a saloon, operated from Woodside in 1864. The iron pier at Eastham was built in 1874. On 26 November 1878, the ferry Gem, a paddle steamer operated from Seacombe by the Wallasey Local Board, collided with the Bowfell, a wooden sailing ship at anchor on the River Mersey; five people died as a result.

In 1886 the Mersey Railway Tunnel was opened, providing competition for the ferry services. The Woodside ferry service began using twin-screw passenger steamers in 1890, which replaced paddle steamers. In 1894 trains were carrying 25,000 passengers per day and the ferries 44,000 per day. The ferry service at Tranmere, which had operated since mediaeval times, closed in 1897. The pier and landing stage at Rock Ferry was built in 1899, and Birkenhead Corporation also operated the ferry service at New Ferry.

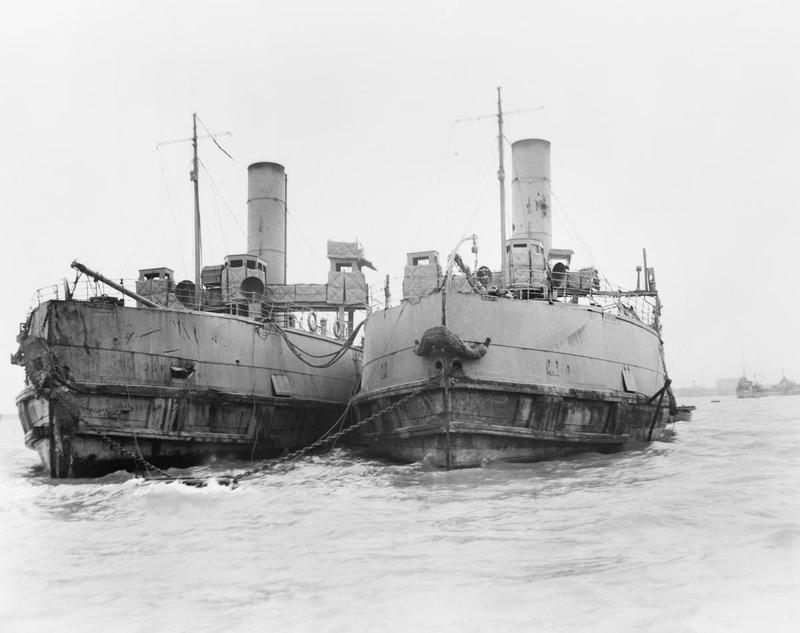
Mersey ferries Daffodil and Iris at Dover in 1918. The vessels had been requisitioned for war service and had recently returned from participating in the Zeebrugge Raid.

In 1914 King George V and Queen Mary travelled on the ferry Daffodil from Wallasey to Liverpool. During the First World War the steamers Iris and Daffodil were taken out of service from Wallasey to be used as troop ships in the naval raid on Zeebrugge in Belgium. The ferries had a shallow draft, allowing them to skim over the mines floating beneath the surface, and were robust enough to approach the heavily defended mole curling into the North Sea. They both saw action, which was described on 24 April 1918 by Vice–Admiral Sir Roger Keyes of the Royal Navy in a message to the ferries' manager:

"I am sure it will interest you to know that your two stout vessels carried Bluejackets and Marines to Zeebrugge, and remained alongside the Mole for an hour, greatly contributing to the success of the operation... The damage caused by enemy gun fire has been repaired".

Because of their work King George V allowed the vessels to use the word "Royal" in their name. They needed extensive refitting before they could resume peacetime activities.

In the boats themselves, there was quick development. The early incarnations of today's modern vessels can be seen in some of the early propeller driven ships, mainly the 1906 pair, Royal Iris and Royal Daffodil. The Wallasey twin screw vessels all had flying bridges with port and starboard docking cabs. As built, the two ferries still had the wheel at promenade deck level, however this was subsequently moved up onto the bridge, so navigation was all on one level. They were all fitted with ahead and astern reciprocating engines and most vessels could achieve a speed of around 12 knots, which is about the same as today's trio of ferries. On early paddlers, the wheelhouse and side cabs were open largely due to the transition from sail to steam, and most ships at the time had open navigation bridges with the ferries being no different. Birkenhead did not use flying bridges, instead having a central wheelhouse and two outer navigation boxes which were raised up higher above deck level. Wallasey ferries employed a funnel livery of white and black and Birkenhead red and black. Birkenhead changed to orange and black after the second world war.

When the railway tunnels were constructed and opened, the ferry service did suffer somewhat but it always remained popular. It was really the advent of the road tunnels that caused trouble. When the Queensway road tunnel opened in 1934, the ferry service from Seacombe lost two million passengers because people started to use the tunnel rather than the ferry. The opening of the road tunnel also had an effect on the luggage boats which were introduced in 1879. Both ferry companies earned a substantial amount from luggage boats, which carried vehicles and goods across the river. When the road tunnel opened, traffic dropped by 80%. By the 1940s, luggage boat services from both Woodside and Seacombe to Liverpool had ceased. From Woodside in 1941 and from Seacombe 1947.

Due to financial losses incurred from a gradual reduction in patronage, Birkenhead Corporation gradually closed its southern terminals; New Ferry (officially) on 22 September 1927, Eastham in 1929 and Rock Ferry on 30 June 1939. The closure of Eastham marked the last use of ferry paddle steamers on the river. Wallasey were always trying to close Egremont, but faced stiff opposition from locals who got petitions to keep the ferry open. The chance came to close Egremont during the Second World War for economic reasons, after the pier was damaged in a collision. This was in similar circumstances to the demise of New Ferry twenty years earlier. As a result, the Egremont service never reopened.

In 1941, mines which had drifted into the River Mersey stopped ferry crossings. The Oxton and Bebington vessels were fitted with cranes to enable them to unload United States aircraft from mid-river and deliver them to the Liverpool landing stage. The Upton vessel was taken by the army and used as a ferry and supply vessel for the anti-aircraft forts in Liverpool Bay.

In 1950, the ferries carried almost 30 million passengers a year, including 11 million on the Woodside ferries and 15 million on Seacombe ferries, but by 1970 the total number fell to 7 million. Night boats across the river were withdrawn and replaced by buses through the tunnel in 1956.

=== The MPTE takes over ===
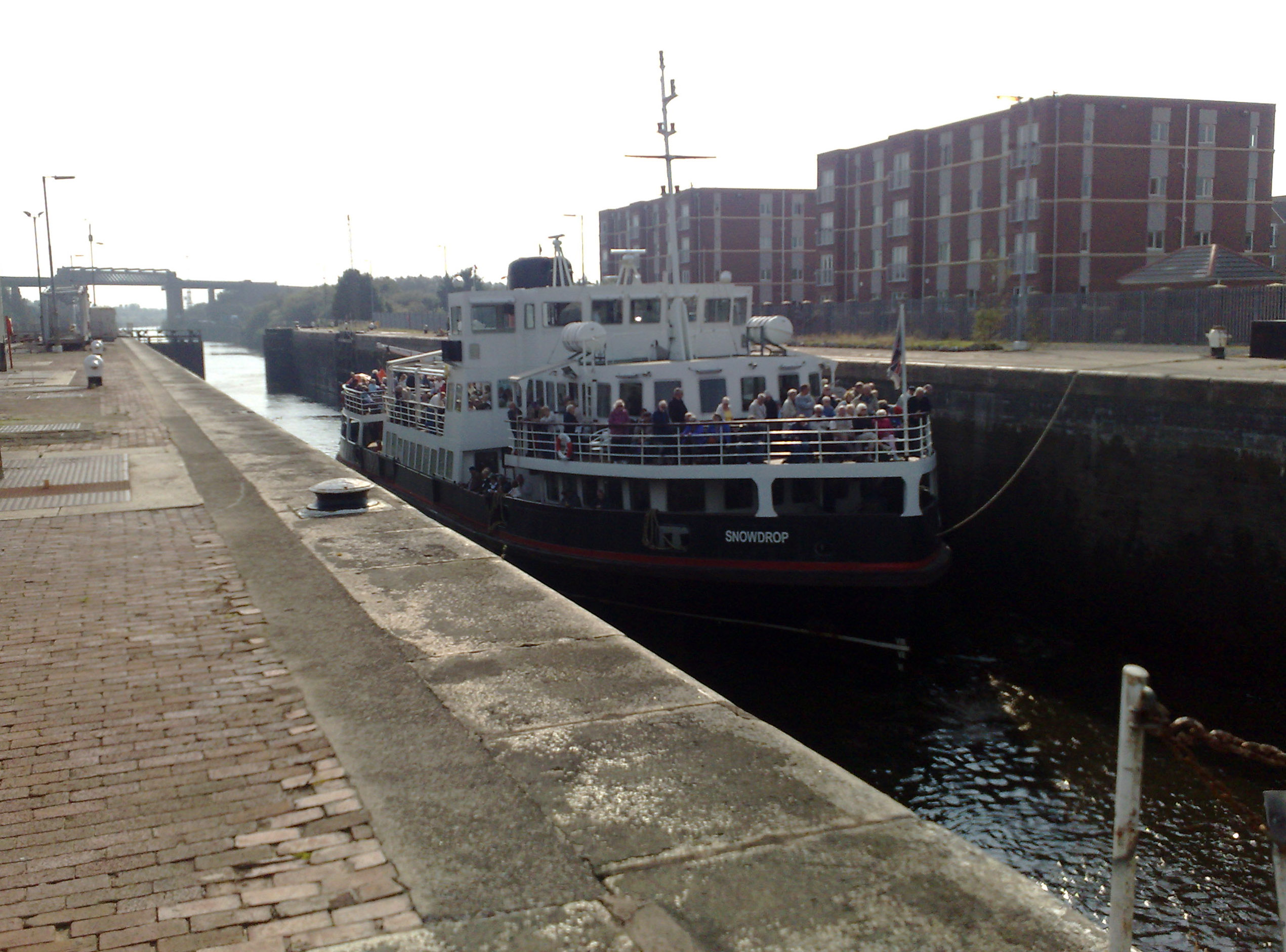
Snowdrop at Irlam Locks on the Manchester Ship Canal

As a result of the Transport Act 1968, the transport functions of both Wallasey and Birkenhead corporations came under the control of the Merseyside Passenger Transport Executive (MPTE) on 1 December 1969. By this time, New Brighton had declined as a tourist destination; owing to this and to silting problems near the landing stage, the ferry service was withdrawn in 1971, with the stage and pier subsequently demolished.

In spite of the close proximity of Wallasey and Birkenhead and their respective ferry landing stages, each corporation had used different gangway spacing on their vessels. This meant that a Wallasey ferry could not utilise both gangways at Birkenhead's terminal at Woodside, and that a Birkenhead boat would be similarly disadvantaged at Seacombe and New Brighton. The Pier Head at Liverpool was obliged to have gangways to suit both sets of ships. When the combined ferry fleet was rationalised, Seacombe Ferry landing stage required the construction of an additional gangway to cater for the Birkenhead vessels.

The 1970s economic situation in Britain saw costs escalating, with funding limited by the MPTE, which was embarking on an expensive operation to construct the Merseyrail "Liverpool Loop" extension. Compounded with the opening of the Kingsway road tunnel on 28 June 1971 and a further decline in passenger numbers (only 4,000-5,000 a day), the future of the service was uncertain. It was sentimental, rather than economical grounds which resulted in the retention of the ferries, after much public protest to keep them. However, service frequency was reduced, with ferry fares being linked to bus and rail fares. During this period, maintenance on the ferries was limited considerably, with the Woodchurch being laid up as a salvage for parts for Mountwood and Overchurch. At this time, the large brass helm from Overchurch was damaged and was replaced by that from Woodchurch. After the damaged helm was repaired, it was placed on Woodchurch. This has remained the case, even after both vessels were extensively rebuilt.

During a brief period in 1982 and 1983, a Western Ferries catamaran by the name of Highland Seabird underwent trials as a possible high speed replacement for one of the existing aging ferries. It operated between Woodside, Seacombe and the Pier Head. During this trial, the vessel retained its existing livery consisting of a red hull and white deck, which contrasted sharply with the black and white livery of other Mersey ferries operating at this time. The operation of the Highland Seabird was short lived as the catamaran had trouble dealing with the challenging conditions on the Mersey. During a passenger crossing in December 1983, she was damaged after being caught by strong winds and the tide and had to be rescued by another Mersey ferry, the Royal Iris who towed her to safety. Following this damage, her trial on the Mersey was considered to have been unsuccessful and she was sold out of the fleet in 1985.

1984 was a momentous year for the ferries and can be seen as the beginning of their rise from the slump of the 1970s. For the duration of the International Garden Festival, a special ferry service was provided to Otterspool Promenade. This service was usually operated by the Overchurch. The ferries also began to operate summer Manchester Ship Canal cruises, a service which had been popular for many years since the canal opened but declined somewhat in the 1960s and 1970s. Sailing ships from the Tall Ships' Race visited the river in August 1984, which helped bring patronage to 250,000 over four days, a level unseen for forty years.

=== Bus deregulation and the 1990 changes ===
Mersey Ferries
- Type: Private limited company
- Industry: Public transport
- Headquarters: Liverpool
- Area served: River Mersey
- Parent: Merseytravel; Liverpool City Region Combined Authority
- Website: www.merseyferries.co.uk

On 26 October 1986 as a result of the Transport Act 1985, bus services were deregulated and restrictions which prevented regular bus services through the Mersey Tunnels were abolished. As a result, many buses which formerly stopped at the Birkenhead Woodside bus/ferry terminal were extended into Liverpool. This was another blow to the Mersey Ferries and the ferry service had to be re-focussed away from commuter traffic, which had declined, to tourist needs.

From 1990 a commuter shuttle has operated Monday-Friday peak period with an hourly River Explorer Cruise. At weekends River Explorer cruises operate from 10:00 to 18:00. The morning peak service until 2010 ran every 30 minutes on a Liverpool-Birkenhead-Seacombe-Liverpool circuit, but since then only runs every 20 minutes from Liverpool-Seacombe Ferry and back.

The evening peak service runs Liverpool-Seacombe every 20 minutes. The Explorer cruises follow a Liverpool-Seacombe-Birkenhead-Liverpool pattern and sail slightly further upstream with a commentary of what can be seen.

These operations run with a bias towards Seacombe Ferry as the vicinity of Seacombe lacks the rail and bus connections of Birkenhead. In the summer there are also cruises up the Manchester Ship Canal.

== Previous and present fleets ==
The "Royal" prefix was granted to the ferries Iris and Daffodil for their service during the First World War where they were instrumental during the Zeebrugge Raid. Both ferries were badly damaged but returned home to a triumphant greeting. Since the original duo's withdrawal, there have been other Royals. The Royal Daffodil II of 1934 was hit by a bomb during the May Blitz and sunk at her berth at Seacombe on 8 May 1941. She was later raised and returned to service by 1943.

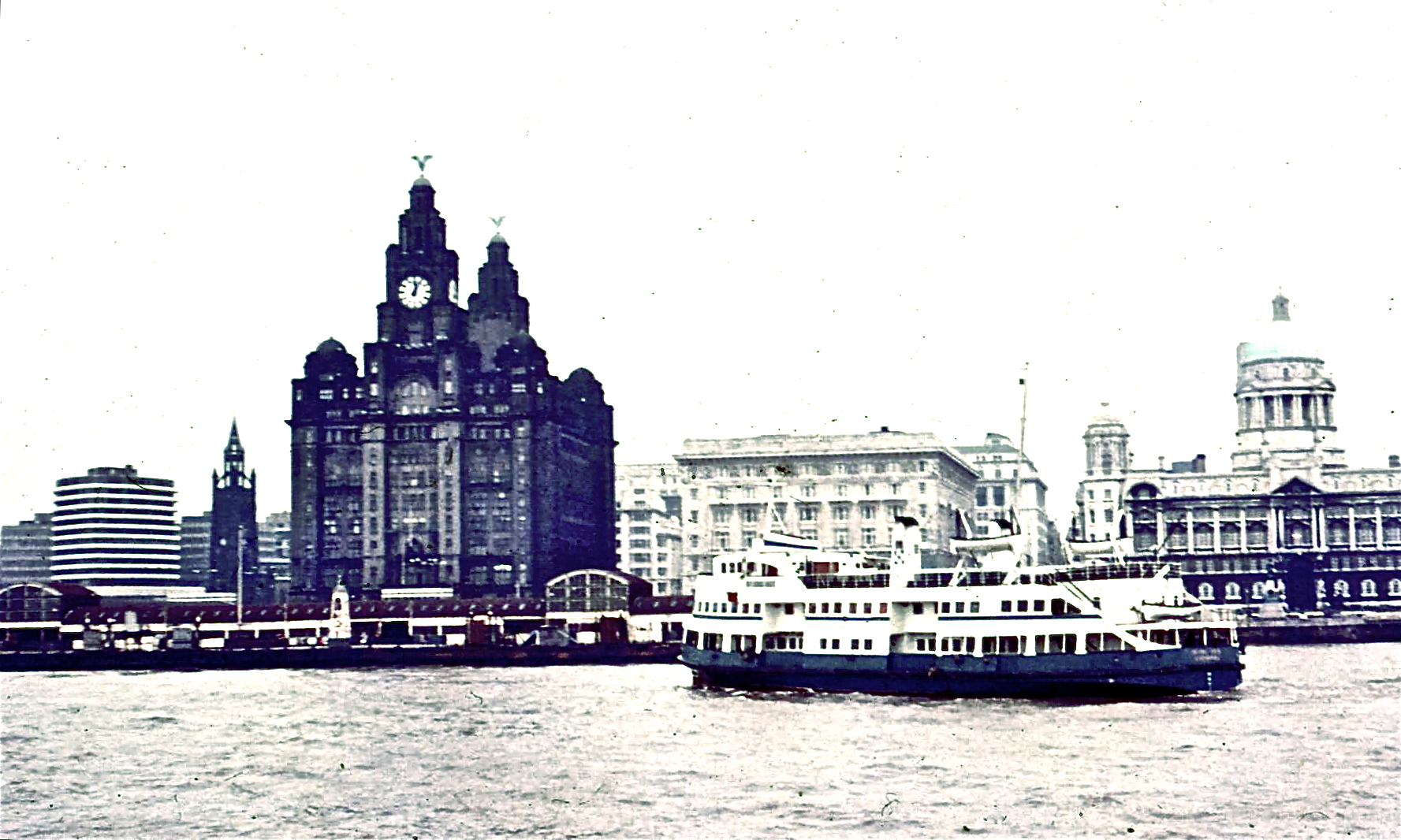
The 1951 Royal Iris approaching Liverpool Pier Head in 1972.

=== Royal Iris (1951) ===
Perhaps the most famous Royal is the Royal Iris of 1951, built by William Denny & Brothers in Dumbarton. She was the first diesel-powered vessel of the Wallasey fleet, with four diesel generators connected to two Metrovick marine propulsion units. The vessel differed from all the other ferries, for she had super-smooth lines and a dummy funnel in place. She was the best-loved of all the Mersey ferries and played host to hundreds of party cruises, in which acts such as Gerry & The Pacemakers, The Searchers, the Beatles and Elvis Costello performed aboard her. The Royal Iris received a major refit in the 1970s and her popular fish-and-chip cafe - which earned her the name "the fish and chip boat" - was removed and replaced with a steak bar. The Royal Iris was also the setting for the 1979 ITV children's programme The Mersey Pirate, for which she was fitted with a temporary geodesic glass dome on her upper deck. The Royal Iris remained in service for nearly 40 years before being sold in 1994 – three years after withdrawal – for use as a floating nightclub. She was then berthed in a deteriorating condition at Woolwich, London. Around 2010 her hull breached, causing her to sink onto the bed of the Thames – which has only served to accelerate the decline in her condition. Attempts to bring her back to Merseyside have come to nothing due to the prohibitive cost of making her fit for a 1,000 mile journey coastwise. In April 2025 it was reported that a fire had broken out on board, gutting most of her remaining interior

=== Leasowe, Egremont and the Royal Daffodil II ===
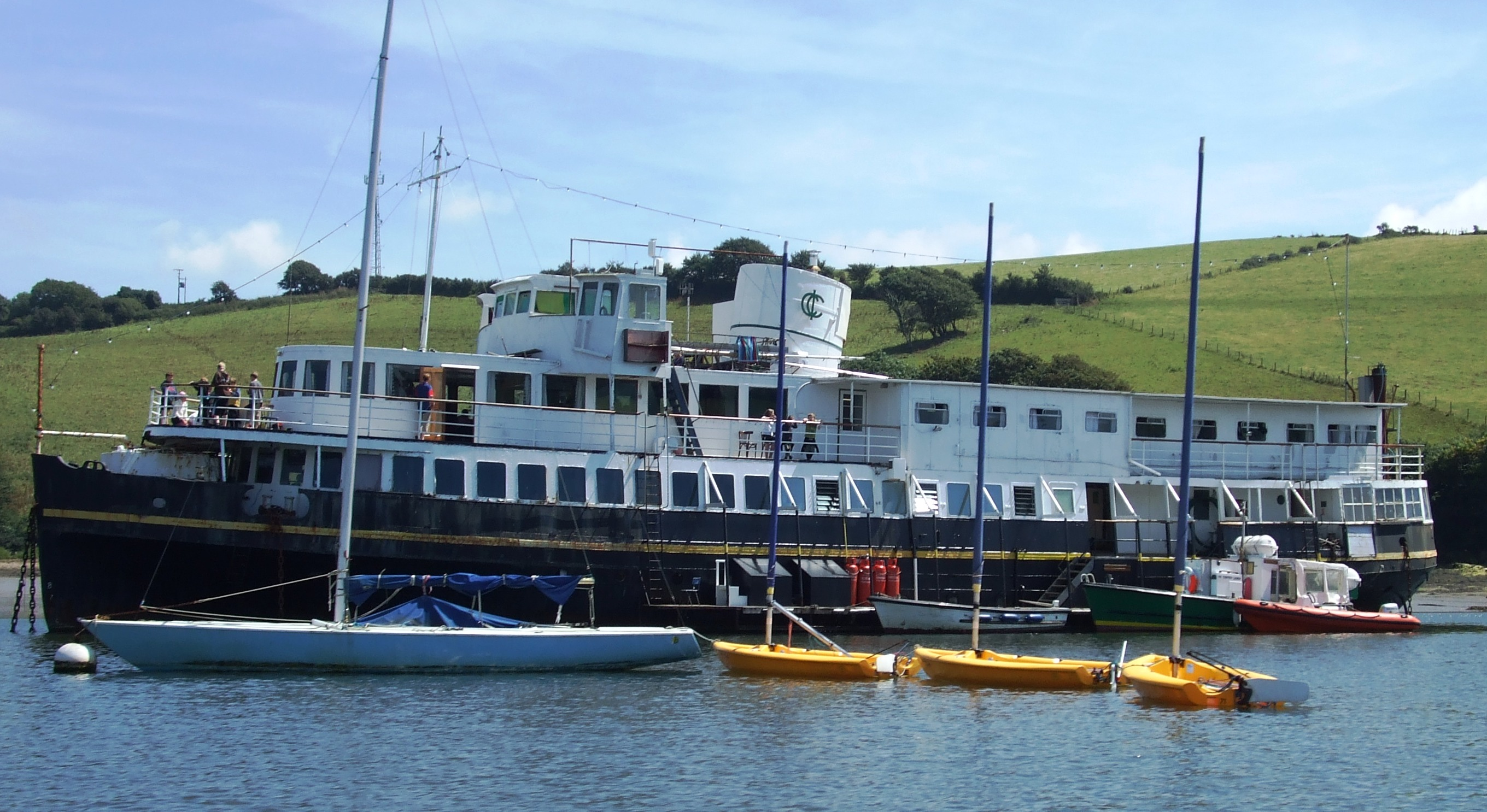
Egremont in Salcombe Harbour

The Leasowe and Egremont were built by Philip and Son in Dartmouth, Devon and entered service in late 1951 and early 1952 respectively. Named after suburbs of Wallasey, both vessels were commissioned by Wallasey Corporation.

They were of a traditional design by naval architects Graham and Woolnough, who are based in Liverpool, but boasted modern equipment including Crossley multi-speed engines for versatile control. They only had one single boarding gangway and their forward saloons extended to the whole width of the ship. This proved somewhat problematic especially at busy periods, so an additional gangway space was added on the promenade deck for use with the high level terminal gangways. The forward saloons also had facility for a bar area and dance floor, which meant the vessels could be used for cruising. The two vessels were primarily used on the Seacombe – Liverpool service, augmenting the New Brighton run during the summer seasons.

Egremont differed externally to Leasowe in that she had a canvas awning fitted around her funnel. Early photographs of Leasowe and Egremont show them to have deckhead compasses above the wheelhouse and side boxes, which appear to have been removed in the late 1950s. Upon the bridge there were numerous modern devices. Chadburn synchrostep telegraphs and rudder angle indicators, hydraulic steering telemotor and an automatic whistle control could be found in both the wheelhouse and the navigation boxes. There was also an internal communication system and a ship to shore radio system. Similar types of navigation equipment and deck fittings used on these vessels are extant on the pilot boat Edmund Gardner at Merseyside Maritime Museum. The Leasowe and Egremont were popular ferries with their crews as they had much improved crew accommodation compared to the earlier steamers, where much of the lower deck space was taken up with boilers and machinery. When the ferries entered service they all had Wallasey white and black funnel liveries.

A second Royal Daffodil II was constructed by James Lamont & Co at Greenock and entered service in 1958. She was larger than the Dartmouth pair as she had three decks and was designed for the dual role of ferry and cruise service. The Roman 'II' was added to her name because of a Thames estuary cruise ship also called Royal Daffodil which existed from 1939 until 1967. The gross register tonnage of Royal Daffodil II was 609. A gross error was the size of her engines, developing 1,360 bhp (1,010 kW) a piece she was underpowered and often struggled in strong tides. Aside from the engine order telegraphs, she also had helms in the side boxes meaning that the ship could be steered from them if required. The vessel ran aground on a sandbank in thick fog in September 1967 and was involved in a collision in January 1968. Taking on water from a hole near her bow, she was beached near Seacombe. Repaired at Cammell Laird, she subsequently returned to service.

During the 1970s the fleet was rationalised, with surplus vessels being put up for sale. Leasowe was sold into Greek ownership in 1974 and renamed Naias II. By 1980 she had been sold on and was renamed Cavo Doro. She remained in service until the early 2000s and is reported to have since been scrapped. Royal Daffodil II was also sold to Greek owners in 1977 and renamed several times. She sank in heavy seas on 7 November 2007, whilst carrying the name Dolphin I, with the loss of her captain and mate.

The Egremont was laid up in Morpeth Dock whilst on sale offer in 1975 and sprang a leak. Her engine room was flooded, ruining her engines and rendering her inoperable. She was stripped of her machinery and used as a floating headquarters for the Island Cruising Club in Salcombe, Devon, not far from her original birthplace. In 2016, the vessel underwent extensive repairs to her hull in Sharpness, Gloucestershire, before being again laid up. By April 2019, the vessel was no longer in use by the ICC and had since been offered for sale. Despite the strong likelihood of being scrapped in 2019, Egremont was still berthed, unused, at Sharpness in July 2025 and moored alongside the Planet Mersey Bar lightvessel.

=== Mountwood, Woodchurch and Overchurch ===
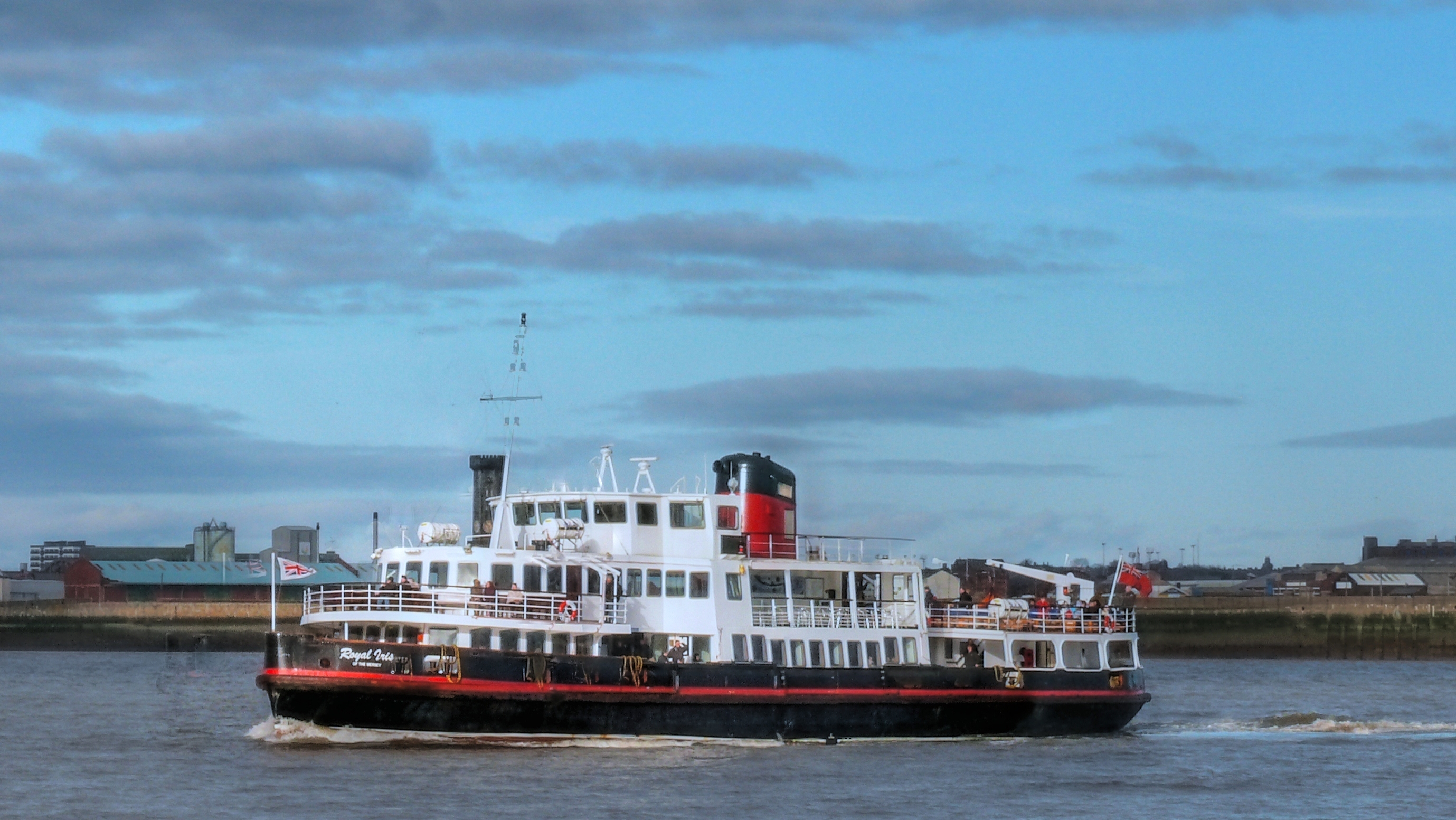
MV Royal Iris of the Mersey (formerly Mountwood) in 2012

Mountwood and Woodchurch were commissioned by Birkenhead Corporation and entered into service in 1960. Two years later they were joined by Overchurch. Named after overspill post-war housing developments of Birkenhead, together these three vessels would operate cross-river ferry services for the next fifty years.

Mountwood and Woodchurch were built at Dartmouth by Philip and Son and based on a similar design by naval architects Graham and Woolnough of Liverpool. The Mountwood was launched on the 31 July 1959 and the Woodchurch on the 28 October of the same year. They were loosely based on designs of the Leasowe and Egremont of the Wallasey fleet, although they both weighed considerably more at 464 tonnes, compared with 311 tonnes for the earlier vessels. They are also larger than the older Wallasey pair, being approximately 19 feet (5.8 m) longer, 6 ft (1.8 m) broader and over 1 ft (0.30 m) taller. Both vessels were externally identical in almost every way up until 1991 when the shroud protecting the aft funnel vent on the Mountwood was changed from square to rounded.

Compared to the earlier Wallasey twins, the Mountwood and Woodchurch were highly advanced. They benefited from an injection of cash from both Birkenhead Corporation and the Joint Tunnel Committee. They were given special Crossley eight-cylinder engines which were fitted with gears and automatic air brakes. New style telegraphs by Chadburns were designed which had a facility for braking the engines for rapid reversal, the telegraphs were part of a brand known as "Synchrostep" and were all originally unpainted brushed aluminium with shiny brass rimming. Overchurch had the same telegraph 'heads' however they were fitted into the wings and main control position in specially built units which also had instruments fitted to them. They entered service in 1960 and were a hit with ferry passengers. They were light, modern and boasted the latest in marine navigation equipment. They were given an orange and black funnel livery, with a red band just above the rubbing strake. In their early years of service both the ferries carried rope fenders to protect the strakes.

On the bridge was also a brass talk tube that linked down to the engine room. A prank amongst bridge crews was to call an engineer on the talk tube then pour water down it, thus soaking the engineer at the other end.

The Mountwood was used in the film "Ferry Cross The Mersey", a musical and subsequent Gerry & The Pacemakers song, crossing to Liverpool from Birkenhead. Her near sister Overchurch also appeared in the background of several shots. In her early years Mountwood was an unreliable ship. She had broken down whilst crossing the river and had to anchor. Her passengers were rescued by Woodchurch. She also collided with Bidston whilst berthing, due to an error in engine movements.

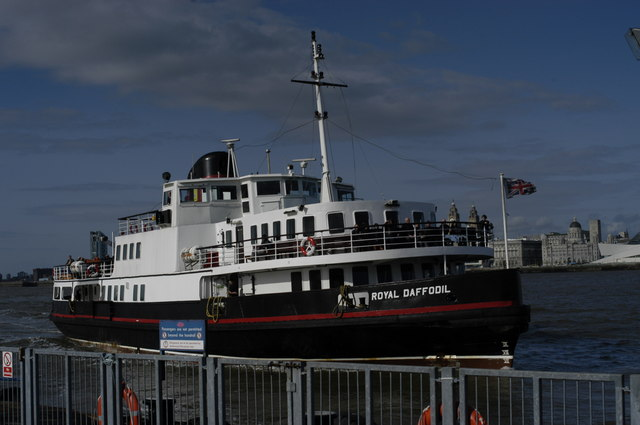
The previous Royal Daffodil (formerly Overchurch) in 2010

In 1962, Mountwood and Woodchurch were joined by a third ferry, the Overchurch. Built at the Birkenhead shipyard of Cammell Laird and Co., Overchurch was of all welded construction and also had a bridge that was completely enclosed rather than a wheelhouse and navigation boxes like Mountwood and Woodchurch. The addition of a totally enclosed bridge meant that there only needed to be one binnacle upon it, whereas on the two sisters there were three, one inside the main wheelhouse and two in the docking/navigation boxes. The Overchurch also had much of its instrumentation fitted into specially built units, meaning the ferry had a spacious bridge, rather than the more compact and cluttered bridges of the Mountwood and Woodchurch. Overchurch had a high funnel immediately behind the bridge and also a small bridge deck, giving the appearance of a somewhat forward top-heavy look, as a result. The Overchurch was fitted with the same navigation equipment as her near sisters. She differed slightly by being a few tonnes heavier and a few inches longer. The Overchurch also had only one access stairway to the promenade deck unlike the Dartmouth twins which had two. In her first year of service, the Overchurch conveyed Princess Alexandra to open the new Cammell Laird dry dock.

The trio of ferries all remained in near-constant operation up until 1981, when cost-cutting measures saw Woodchurch withdrawn for almost three years. It was rumoured that she was cannibalised to help keep her sisters running. Whilst in lay up at Clarence dry docks, she was offered for sale, with one prospective buyer hoping to use her to operate cruises around the Isle of Man. She was not sold, and after main engine repairs and a full repaint, Woodchurch returned to service in 1983, freeing up Overchurch to become the primary ferry to be used on a new Otterspool service, set up for the 1984 International Garden Festival. The ferries all operated on a normal 20-minute route throughout this.

The late 1970s and early 1980s saw very limited budgets for maintenance and the ferries are noted to have appeared in poor condition during this period.

In 1989, Mountwood and Woodchurch were withdrawn and extensively refurbished internally which resulted in complete rewiring and main engine repairs. They were given new modern interiors and their separate bridge wings and wheel houses were plated over to form one large bridge, although none of the original equipment was removed from the new bridge. They entered service by July 1990 in time for the QE2's first visit to the Mersey and also operated the new "heritage cruises". They also were given a new black and red livery replacing the red white and blue given for the Garden Festival season of 1984. The Overchurch also underwent some refurbishments at Bootle. She was then moved to the ferries' regular berth on the East Float, where she was used as a stand by vessel and during the busy summer season. In 1996 the Overchurch was given a small refit which involved the enclosing of the promenade deck shelter.

The Snowdrop and Royal Iris each carry two Kockums Super Tyfon TA 100/165 type fog horns. Royal Daffodil carries two Kockums Super Tyfon TA 100/195 horns. These are the original horns fitted when the ferries were first built. Both Royal Iris of the Mersey and Snowdrop have an E-flat tone, and Royal Daffodil's is in F Sharp. When berthing the vessel, the captain uses a combination of rudder positions and engine movements. The ferries all have twin rudders and propellers, making them very manoeuvrable.

=== Refits and renamings ===
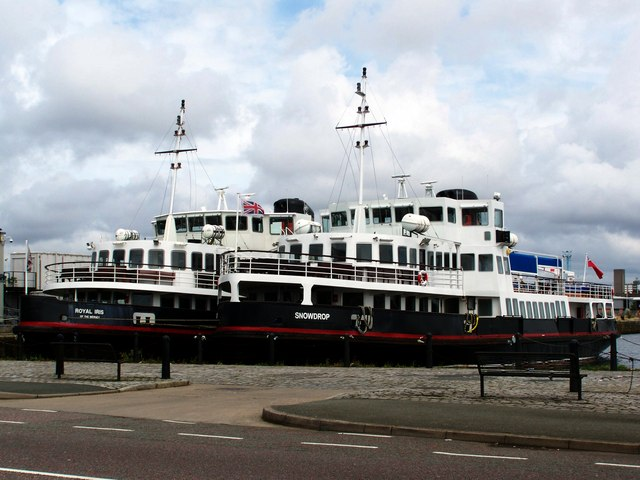
Royal Iris of the Mersey and Snowdrop berthed at East Float, Wallasey

The Overchurch was given her major refit in 1998 at Lengthline Ship Repairers in Manchester, which resulted in a major rebuilding of all decks and fitting of new engines and navigation equipment. She was renamed Royal Daffodil and returned to service in 1999 until January 2013. Mountwood and Woodchurch were also refitted and renamed Royal Iris of the Mersey and Snowdrop, respectively in 2002 and 2004. The ferries were re-designed by their original architects - Graham and Woolnough. When all three vessels were refitted, the previously used helms and binnacles with compasses were placed back on the refurbished bridges. The current two ferries have been in service for over 60 years, with 2019 marking the 60th anniversary of the launching of Royal Iris of the Mersey and the Snowdrop.

The Wärtsilä engines installed on the ferries during their last major refit are much more economical than the previous engines by Crossley Bros of Manchester. They are also much 'greener' and produce much less emissions than the original propulsion units.

=== Liveries ===
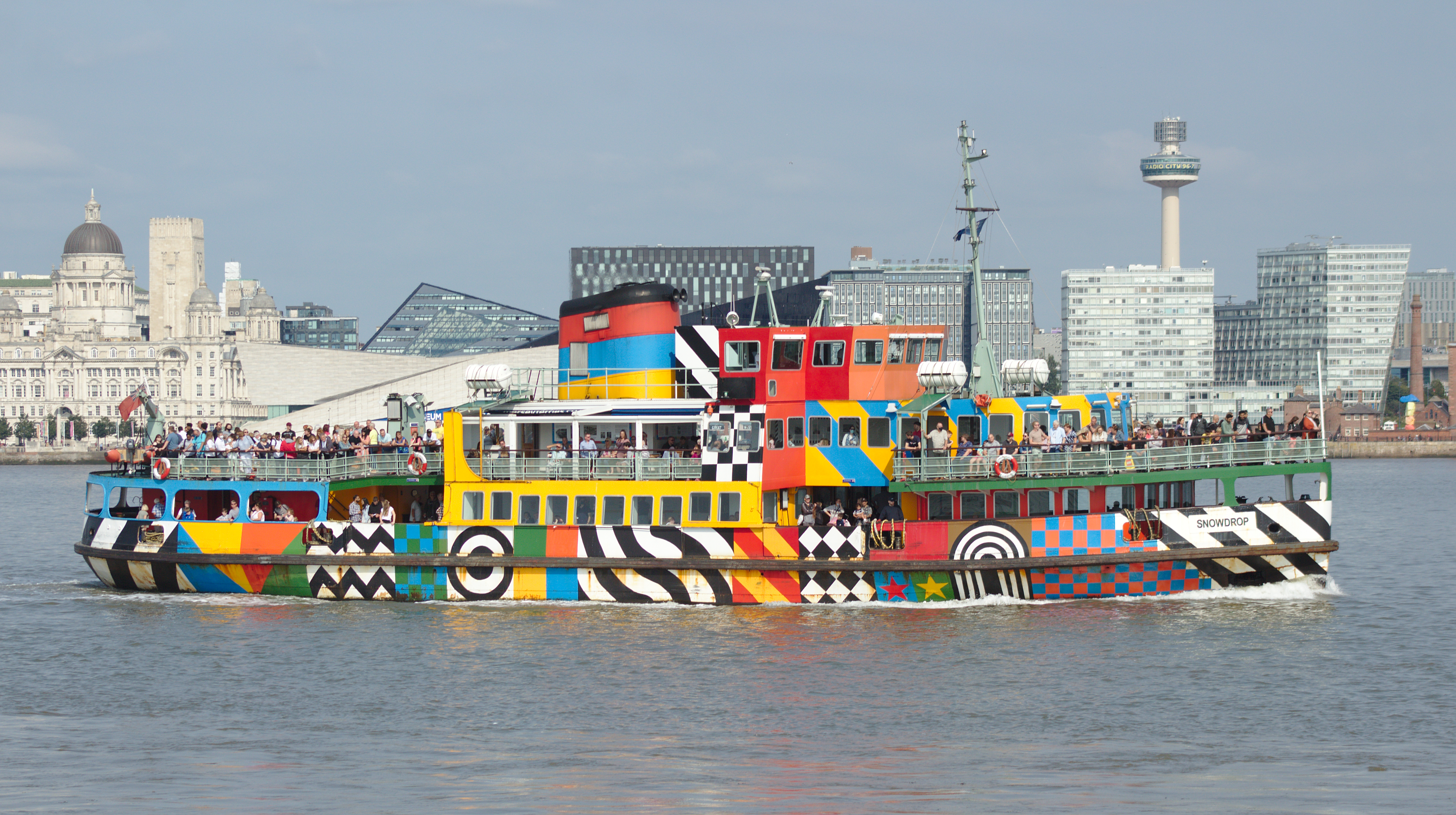
Snowdrop in her "Razzle Dazzle" livery

The ferry companies were identifiable by their different colour liveries displayed on each vessel's funnel. Wallasey ferries carried a black and white colour scheme. Early Birkenhead steamers carried red and black, however this appears to have changed to orange in the 1920s or 1930s, remaining until the merger of the two fleets under the Merseyside Passenger Transport Executive in 1969. When the ferries were taken over by the MPTE, the liveries of Birkenhead and Wallasey were replaced initially with a primrose yellow and powder blue colour scheme. This was followed by a black and green livery, then in 1984 by the colours of the Union Flag for the International Garden Festival celebrations. By the 1990s the vessels carried a red and black colour scheme, similar to that previously used by Birkenhead Corporation.

From January 2015, MV Snowdrop had a special livery applied, based on the World War I dazzle camouflage and designed by Peter Blake.

== Future ==
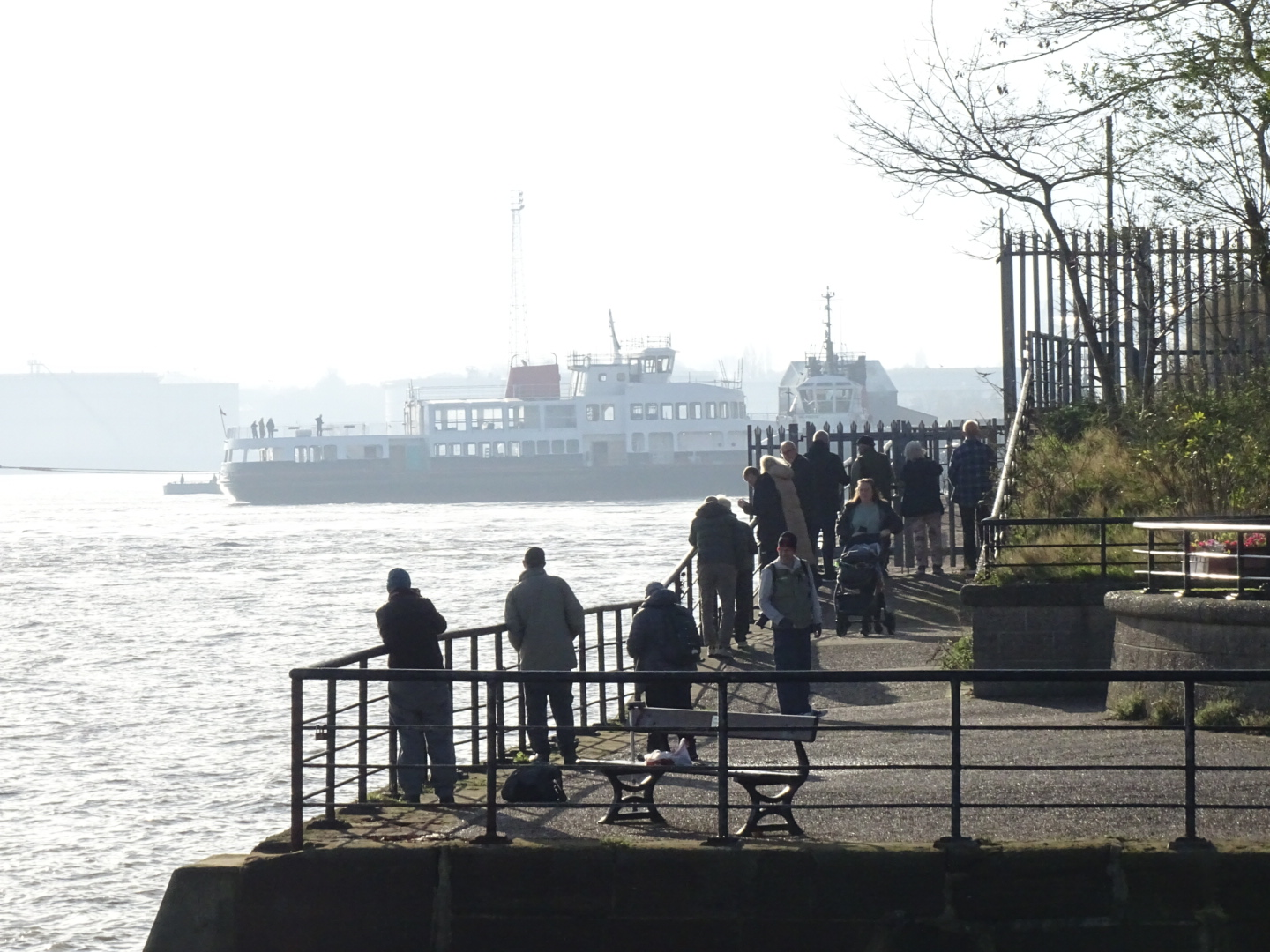
Royal Daffodil being floated on the river for the first time, 6 November 2025

In January 2018, the Mayor of the Liverpool City Region, Steve Rotheram announced that plans had been drawn up for a new vessel. The announcement stated that naval architects had prepared initial designs and there would be a period of public consultation on the designs. In November 2022 a contract for a new vessel was placed jointly with Cammell Laird and Netherlands shipbuilders Damen Group. Royal Daffodil was launched in November 2025, and will enter service in 2026.
