= MV Royal Daffodil (1962) =

Mersey ferry built as MV Overchurch and renamed in 1998

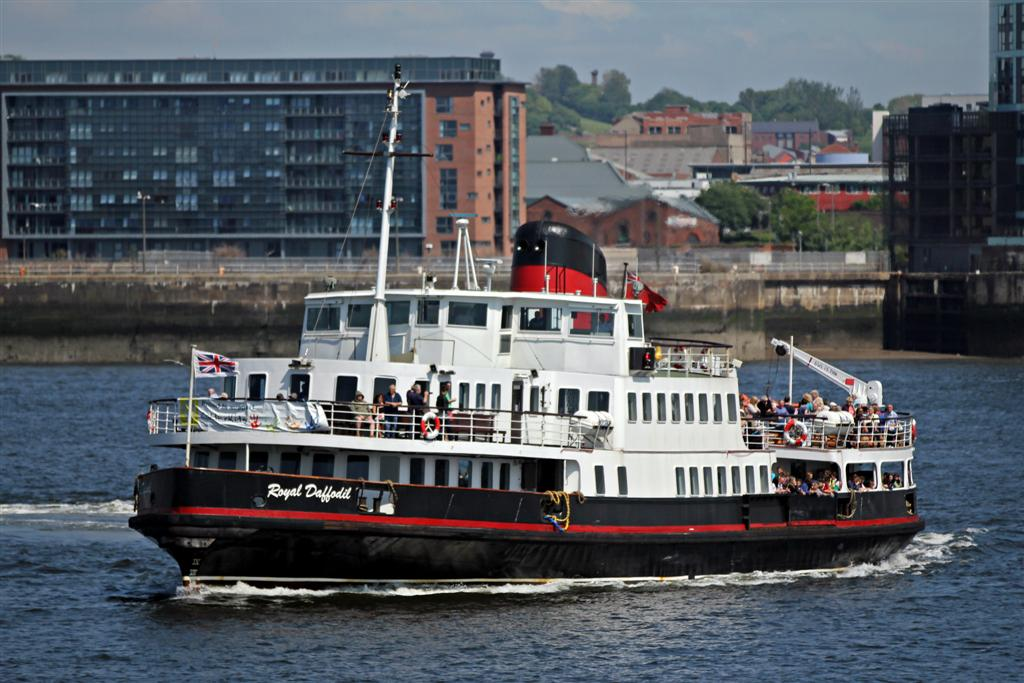
- MV Royal Daffodil on the River Mersey in May 2012

History
- Name: 1962-1999: Overchurch; 1999-2024: Royal Daffodil; 2024 onwards: Daffodill
- Owner: 1962-1968: Birkenhead Corporation; 1968-2019: Merseytravel; 2019 onwards- Liverpool City Sights Ltd
- Operator: 1962-1968: Birkenhead Corporation; 1968-1990: Merseytravel; 1990-2013: Mersey Ferries; 2019-Liverpool City Sights Ltd
- Port of registry: 1962 onwards: Liverpool, United Kingdom
- Builder: Cammell Laird, United Kingdom
- Laid down: April 1961
- Launched: November 1961
- Christened: November 1961
- Completed: March 1962
- Maiden voyage: April 1962
- Identification: IMO number: 4900868; MMSI number: 235024006; Callsign: MHWB2
- Status: Floating Bar

General characteristics
- Class & type: Class IV with seasonal class III
- Tonnage: 751 GT
- Length: 44m
- Beam: 12m
- Draught: 3.5m
- Decks: 4 - bridge deck, promenade deck, main deck, lower deck
- Installed power: 2 × Cummins-Wärtsilä 170 diesel engines
- Speed: 12–15 knots (22–28 km/h; 14–17 mph)
- Capacity: 860 on ferry duties, 370 on cruises
- Crew: Captain, mate, engineer, seapersons × 2, catering assistant

MV Royal Daffodil is a former Mersey ferry, built in 1962 to provide passenger ferry service across the River Mersey in England. Until a major refit in 1998 /1999, she was named MV Overchurch, she began service for Birkenhead Corporation Ferries in 1962 and was in regular service on the river until her withdrawal in December 2012. Despite her extensive re-build in 1999, the ship still retains a similar profile to that of her original design. After her withdrawal, the vessel remained idle since her dry docking and survey in January 2013. In April 2019 a new home was confirmed for the ship in the form of a new floating leisure attraction, in Liverpool's Canning Dock.

== MV Overchurch ==
The ferry was built for Birkenhead Corporation in 1962 at Cammell Laird, Birkenhead. She was named after one of the town's post-war overspill housing developments.

Overchurch was the first of the fleet to be of all-welded construction and was the last Mersey Ferryboat to have been built until 2025, with the introduction of the new Royal Daffodil. The Overchurch was popular with its Captains and Mates as its navigation bridge spanned the whole ship, rather than having a wheelhouse and side cabs such as Mountwood and Woodchurch used. A model of the ship by builders Cammell Laird is on display in the Williamson Gallery in Birkenhead. The wheelhouse was spacious with a single binnacle and brass wheel. Most of the ship's control instruments were fitted into specially-built stand alone units, including the telegraph heads. Unlike Mountwood and Woodchurch, there was no central set of telegraphs next to the helm, so the crew were required to move to either of the bridge wings to control the engines. Her bridge was modern, unlike the compact and relatively cluttered bridges on the Overchurch's two near sisters, where most of the instruments were attached to the bulkheads. It was a handsome vessel, with clean and smooth lines and a stout funnel. Her original livery was Birkenhead's orange and black, with a flame red band above the rubbing strake.

The Overchurch contained identical engines to Mountwood and Woodchurch, however, with a gross tonnage of 468, the ship was slightly heavier than its two near sisters. Overchurch was fitted with a small deck area just behind the bridge and around the rakish funnel. The funnel was joined to the bridge at the front and was quite high, giving the ferry a top heavy look. There were also sheltering bulkheads beneath the bridge wings. When built, she was somewhat more advanced than the two sisters. Her wheelhouse generally offered a more pleasant working environment for her crews as they did not need to venture outside when berthing the vessel in order to reach the bridge wing, as they did on the slightly older Mountwood and Woodchurch.

=== Engines & manoeuvrability ===
The two medium-speed Crossley diesel engines developed over 1,400 bhp combined and could easily propel the vessel over 12 knots against the flow of the tide. Both engines were controlled by Chadburn 'Synchrostep' telegraphs on the bridge. Like her near sisters, these were fitted with custom command dials which allowed for greater speed control ahead and astern and quick direction change by a 'brake' position which stopped the engines rapidly. Despite the concise level of control over her engines, she could be difficult to handle in strong winds. This was due to a design flaw which saw the front of her high funnel joined to the bridge. As such, airflow was blocked and this could create a 'sail' type effect under certain conditions meaning bringing her alongside could become troublesome. In addition, the flare of her bow was different to her two near sisters, her having a tendency to throw water over her forward observation deck in a strong swell.

=== In service ===
Her first official duty was in 1962, when she conveyed Princess Alexandra to open the new Cammell Laird dry dock.

Like the other new ferries, Overchurch was popular with passengers, offering heated saloon accommodation on the main deck, together with a large open top deck with a forward shelter and observation deck for passengers. She was in more or less constant operation aside from periods of dry docking and maintenance - including the early 1980s when her near sister Woodchurch was laid up in Morpeth Dock for a lengthy period in an effort to save costs. Overchurch was chosen as the primary ferry to operate a new service to Otterspool Promenade during the 1984 International Garden Festival, when all the ferries were given a new livery of red white and blue, replacing the black and green livery given in the mid 1970s. She operated alone throughout the Mountwood and Woodchurch refurbishment, her last full season was 1989.

In 1991, she was used until the two sisters returned in time for Queen Elizabeth 2's first visit to Liverpool. After the summer season, she was moved to Bootle and underwent cosmetic refurbishments. A cafe was installed in her upper deck shelter. She was then placed as a standby vessel, ready in case one of the two sisters broke down. The Mountwood and Woodchurch were reliable boats and worked on an interchanging rota with around two weeks of operational service and then two weeks of repairs and maintenance. This meant that Overchurch underwent lengthy periods of disuse, being laid up in the East Float of Birkenhead Docks. Overchurch saw most of her active service at peak times and during the summer months when special cruises were operated. In 1996 plans were afoot to refurbish Overchurch to allow her provision for operating dance and party cruises. The plans were developed and funding sourced to secure the refit. In 1998 she journeyed to Manchester to undergo a major refit.

== Refurbishment ==
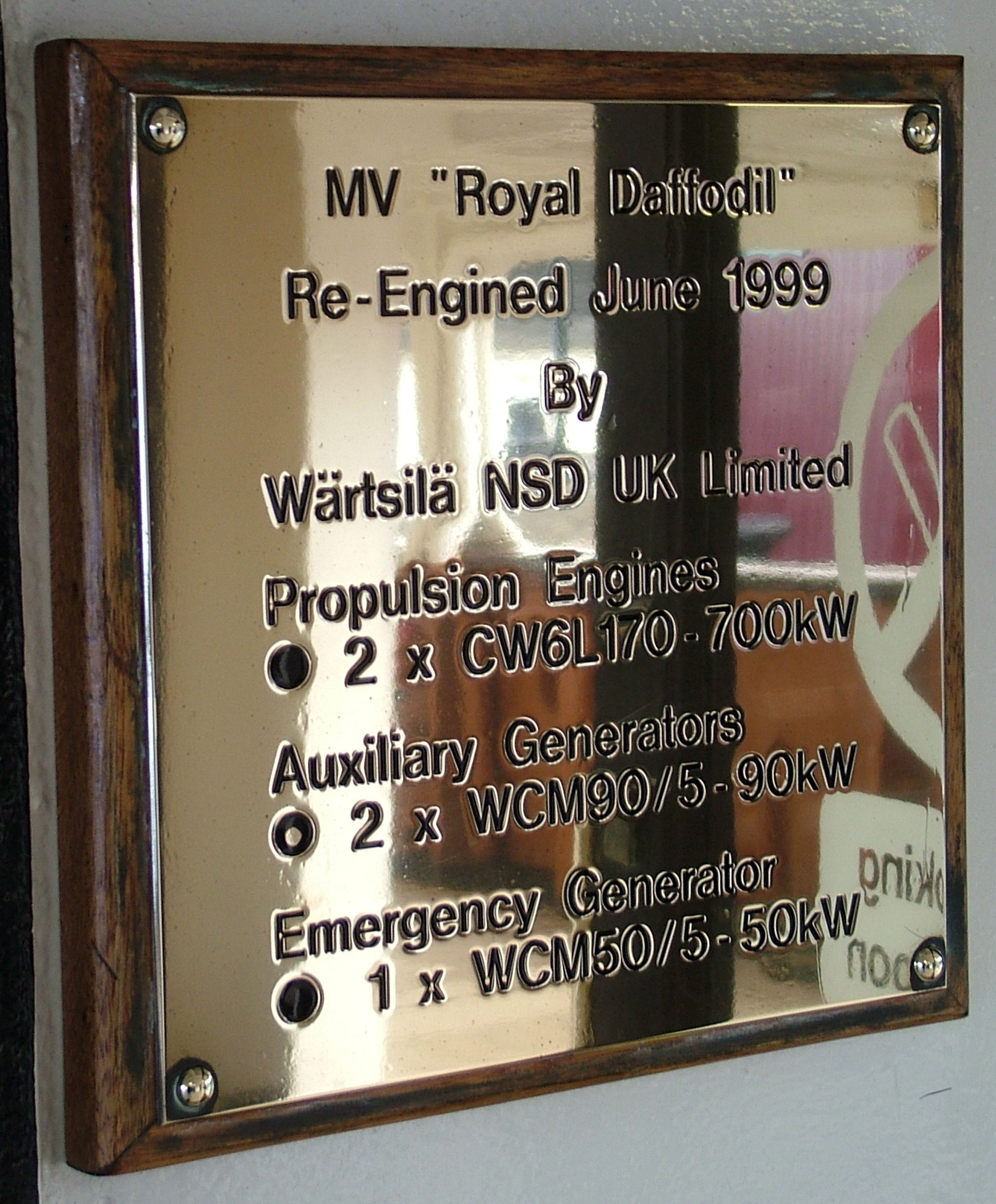
MV Royal Daffodil engine specifications plaque, added during the 1998-99 refit

The Overchurch was given her major refit in 1998 at Lengthline Ship Repairers in Manchester, which resulted in a major rebuilding of all decks. Her funnel and bridge were removed during this process together with other parts of her superstructure to permit access into the engine room for removal of the redundant machinery. After installation of new engines, the superstructure was rebuilt. New engines and auxiliaries were fitted and the resulting transformation was spectacular. Her original funnel and bridge, including binnacle and brass helm, were retained, albeit with some minor additions. The ferry also retains its original pair of Kockums Supertyfon TA 150/195 air horns. They sound at F sharp and are a slightly different model from her sisters'.

== MV Royal Daffodil ==
She was renamed Royal Daffodil and was back in service by 1999. Yet, close examination of her bows and stern, the name "Overchurch" could still be seen beneath the black paint. In March 2011 the ferry had her bows re-plated and now carries her name in Birkenhead Corporation style cursive font. The Royal Daffodil changed considerably from her previous guise. The lower main and forward saloons were gutted and extensively re-built, spanning to whole width of the ship. Catering and bar facilities were installed plus fabric seating, carpets and tables and chairs. The upper saloon was also enclosed and extended, with a dance floor fitted and another bar area. The bridge deck was also extended to the full width of the ship. Immediately behind the bridge a small crew room was installed. Below decks there is another large dance floor in the former smoke room and there is crew accommodation at the stern of the vessel. The engine room was completely gutted during the refit, and major re-structuring work took place within it. The new engines were fitted further back to allow greater space around them for additional machinery. The engine room also contains a control centre which includes a set of telegraphs for direct operation of the engines by the duty engineer. The main deck stairwell was also covered over with a shelter-like structure, having previously been open.

Royal Daffodil was often used for functions and party or special cruises as well as regular cross river service. Her rebuild differed from the other ships in the fleet, as she was re-built primarily for cruising. Whereas, the Mountwood (Royal Iris of the Mersey) and the Woodchurch (Snowdrop) were re-built as standard multi-purpose ferries.

From 2007, the Daff as she is affectionately known by Ferries staff and enthusiasts, begin to see less regular use on the river. The reasons cited by Merseytravel was persistent engine problems, which was a direct result of her engines no longer being in production, despite only being several years old.

=== Near miss ===
On 23 October 2009, the Royal Daffodil was carrying a full load of passengers to witness the aviation display to celebrate the visit of HMS Illustrious to the Mersey. The ferry appeared to be on a direct course across the bows of the approaching oil tanker Ramira. Evasive action was taken by both vessels after the Ramira sounded her whistle. Some passengers were shocked and upset but nobody sustained any injuries. An investigation by the Liverpool Harbour Master and the MCA concluded the Captain of the ferry to be at fault, and both Captain and Mate were disciplined.

=== Withdrawal ===
The Royal Daffodil was withdrawn from service in December 2012 and traveled to the ferries berth at Duke Street. On a snowy morning in January 2013, she made the short journey to Cammell Laird's shipyard where she underwent dry docking and a full survey, including re application of anti-foul painting to her hull. After her return to Duke Street she was laid up. The ferry had remained at Duke St since this time. Her life saving equipment and rescue boat were removed and the ferry did not return to service. During her period of lay up, basic maintenance was completed, including 'turning' of the engines and testing of the generators and other such equipment. Cosmetically, the vessel became weather worn and certain areas of the paintwork were showing considerable markings from rust - although her interiors remained in good condition. In late 2018 and early 2019 a series of break ins occurred with some items being removed from the ferry, with additional security measures being put in place.

== Present ==
In April 2019, Merseytravel confirmed that Liverpool City Sights had taken ownership of the vessel and it was to become a floating leisure attraction in Liverpool. In May 2019 the vessel travelled under tow from two tugs out of its East Float berth in Birkenhead to Carmet Marine in Bromborough. The ferry was partly refitted over Spring and Summer of 2019 before moving to a slipway in Garston for her electrical rewiring and interior fixtures. Her engines and machinery inside her engine room were removed along with the propellers and generators. To achieve this, a section of port side hull was cut out below the waterline for the removal of the machinery. The interior of the ship, including the bridge was gutted and stripped of components. Her hull received a fresh coat of anti-fouling paint and was completely pressure washed.

In December 2024, it began trading as a bar and restaurant named Daffodil from a permanent mooring in Canning Dock.

The new 2026 Mersey ferry will be named Royal Daffodil.
