= MV Royal Daffodil II =

Mersey ferry built in 1958 and lost at sea in 2007

History
- Name: 1958–1977: Royal Daffodil II; 1977–1992: Ioulis Keas II; 1992–~1994: Agia Kyriaki; ~1994–2007: Dolphin I
- Owner: 1958–1968: Wallasey Corporation; 1968–1977: Merseytravel; 1977–2007: various owners
- Operator: 1958–1968: Wallasey Corporation; 1968–1977: Merseytravel; 1977–2007: various owners
- Route: 1958–1977: Mersey Ferry
- Builder: James Lamont & Co, Greenock, United Kingdom
- Launched: 6 December 1957
- Out of service: 7 November 2007
- Identification: IMO number: 5301318
- Fate: Lost at sea

MV Royal Daffodil II was a Mersey ferry, built in 1958 to provide passenger ferry service across the River Mersey in England. In 1977, she was sold to new owners and operated in the Eastern Mediterranean as the Ioulis Keas II, Agia Kyriaki and Dolphin I, before being lost at sea in 2007.

Royal Daffodil II was constructed by James Lamont & Co at Greenock and entered service in 1958. She was larger than the earlier Leasowe and Egremont, as she had three decks and was designed for the dual role of ferry and cruise service. She was named after the SS Royal Daffodil, a previous Mersey ferry that had gained the "Royal" prefix for her service in the First World War. The Roman "II" was added to her name because of a Thames estuary cruise ship also called Royal Daffodil, which existed from 1939 until 1967.

The gross register tonnage of Royal Daffodil II was 609. A gross error was the size of her engines, developing 1,360 bhp (1,010 kW) a piece she was underpowered and often struggled in strong tides. Aside from the engine order telegraphs, she also had helms in the side boxes meaning that the ship could be steered from them if required. The vessel ran aground on a sandbank in thick fog in September 1967 and was involved in a collision in January 1968. Taking on water from a hole near her bow, she was beached near Seacombe. Repaired at Cammell Laird, she subsequently returned to service.

Royal Daffodil II was sold to Greek owners and renamed Ioulis Keas II in 1977. It was converted into a roll-on/roll-off ferry in 1980, but still retained its forward section largely in its original condition. It was renamed Agia Kyriaki in 1992. Two years later the vessel was renamed again as Dolphin I and registered in the Turkish Republic of Northern Cyprus. The ferry sank in heavy seas on 7 November 2007, 20 miles (32 km) off the coast of Cape Apostolos Andreas. The cause of the sinking was main engine and steering gear failure, and she claimed the lives of both her captain and mate.
