= Paul Lincoln =

Australian professional wrestler and promoter

Personal information
- Born: James McDonald Lincoln; 3 May 1932 Sydney, New South Wales, Australia
- Died: 11 January 2011 (aged 78) Southampton, England, United Kingdom
- Spouse: Elizabeth Lincoln
- Children: 1

Professional wrestling career
- Ring name(s): Dr. Death; Elmo Lincoln; James Lincoln; Major Lincoln; Paul Lincoln
- Billed height: 5 ft 8 in (173 cm)
- Billed from: "Hollywood, United States"

British Wrestling Federation (Paul Lincoln et al version)
- Acronym: BWF
- Founded: 1958 (collective formed)
- Defunct: 1970
- Style: Professional wrestling
- Headquarters: England
- Founder: group led by Paul Lincoln
- Formerly: Paul Lincoln Managements (and others)

Paul Lincoln (born James McDonald Lincoln; 3 May 1932 – 11 January 2011), also known by the ring name Dr. Death, was an Australian professional wrestler and promoter.

== Professional wrestling career ==
After leaving high school, Lincoln began wrestling in showground bouts staged by Roy Bell. He went on to wrestle under the ring name "Elmo Lincoln". During his late teens, he wrestled in Singapore.

In 1951, at the age of 19, Lincoln emigrated to the United Kingdom. He initially wrestled as "James Lincoln" and "Paul Lincoln" before George Kidd advised him to wear a mask and adopt the ring name "Dr. Death".

As Dr. Death, Lincoln "brought fear to wrestling rings across the South throughout the '50s and '60s." He was known to wrestle on cards as Paul Lincoln and then again as Dr. Death. During the 1960s, he had a heated feud with the heroic White Angel, modelled on a similar headline feud in France pitting L'Ange Blanc against Le Bourreau de Bethune; during one bout in The Metropolitan Theatre, an audience member shot at Lincoln with an air gun. The feud culminated in a mask versus mask match that was won by Lincoln.

Within a year of arriving in the UK, Lincoln began promoting. His promotion, Paul Lincoln Managements, competed against then-market leader Joint Promotions by using contacts at Granada Theatres to market his events and by bringing in international stars such as Ski Hi Lee and "The Wild Man of Borneo". In the 1960s, Lincoln was reportedly bought out by Joint Promotions for £1 million. and his promotion was merged into Joint in 1970.

After Bert Assirati was stripped of the British Heavyweight Championship by Joint Promotions in 1958, Lincoln led a collective of independent promoters named the British Wrestling Federation (not to be confused with the similarly named promotion later run by Orig Williams) who continued to recognise Assirati as champion. When Assirati was injured in 1960, Lincoln and his BWF associates switched recognition to Shirley Crabtree. Unhappy with this, Assirati conducted a campaign of harassment against Crabtree at BWF shows, forcing him to retire from wrestling for several years.

In the 1970s, Lincoln was unmasked in a bout with Peter Maivia. He went on to wrestle in Valencia, Spain before returning to Australia in 1975, where he wrestled in Melbourne as "Major Lincoln". He returned to the UK in 1986, settling in Southampton.

== Professional wrestling persona ==
For most of his career, Lincoln wrestled as the villainous "Dr. Death", who wore a black leather mask and black boots (and approached the ring wearing a black robe) and was billed from Hollywood. Lincoln was "burly" but relatively short for a professional wrestler. His finishing move was a clawhold.

Towards the end of his career, Lincoln also wrestled as "Major Lincoln", a heelish officer of the British Army.

== Music promoter ==
In April 1956, Lincoln and his business partner Ray Hunter purchased the lease on the 2i's, a steakhouse in Soho, London, and turned it into a coffeehouse. Lincoln planned to use the rooms above the restaurant as temporary accommodation for foreign wrestlers. In July 1956, The Vipers Skiffle Group took shelter from the rain in the 2i's, whereupon Lincoln suggested they keep playing in the coffeehouse's basement. The success of their impromptu performance made Lincoln reconsider his plans; he made the 2i's a live music venue, and gave The Vipers a residency. The 2i's went on to become hugely successful after Lincoln began staging music evenings aimed at teenagers featuring rock and roll and skiffle acts.

The 2i's became known as "a recruiting centre for the first generation of London rockers" and "a haven for managers and agents on the hunt for fresh talent". Musicians such as Cliff Richard, Adam Faith, Ritchie Blackmore, Lionel Bart, and Tommy Steele went on to launch their careers in the 2i's. Lincoln recruited the bouncer of the 2i's, Peter Grant, as a wrestler. In addition to running the 2i's, Lincoln also managed the musicians Terry Dene, Wee Willie Harris, and Kris Kristofferson, as well as the band Les Hobeaux.

In 1957, Lincoln conceived the idea of staging skiffle concerts on voyage between Southend, England and Boulogne, France. He chartered the paddle steamer MV Royal Daffodil and sold tickets for what was dubbed the "Rock Across the Channel". The concerts ran until 1963, with acts such as James Brown, Ray Charles, Chas Hodges, Jerry Lee Lewis, The Shadows, and Gene Vincent amongst those performing.

In 1964, Lincoln (along with Tony Mitchell, Ray Hunter, Bob Anthony and Al Hayes) opened the Cromwellian - a nightclub on Gloucester Road, South Kensington. 'The Crom' would be an important meeting place for celebrities of the Swinging Sixties, including The Beatles, Georgie Fame, The Animals, Jimi Hendrix, Manfred Mann and other acts, many of whom also performed at the club.

== Personal life ==
Lincoln was married to Elizabeth, with whom he had a daughter, Natalie.

== Death ==
Lincoln died on 11 January 2011 at the age of 78. He had been afflicted with cancer and Parkinson's disease.
