= SS Royal Iris =

English steam ferryboat

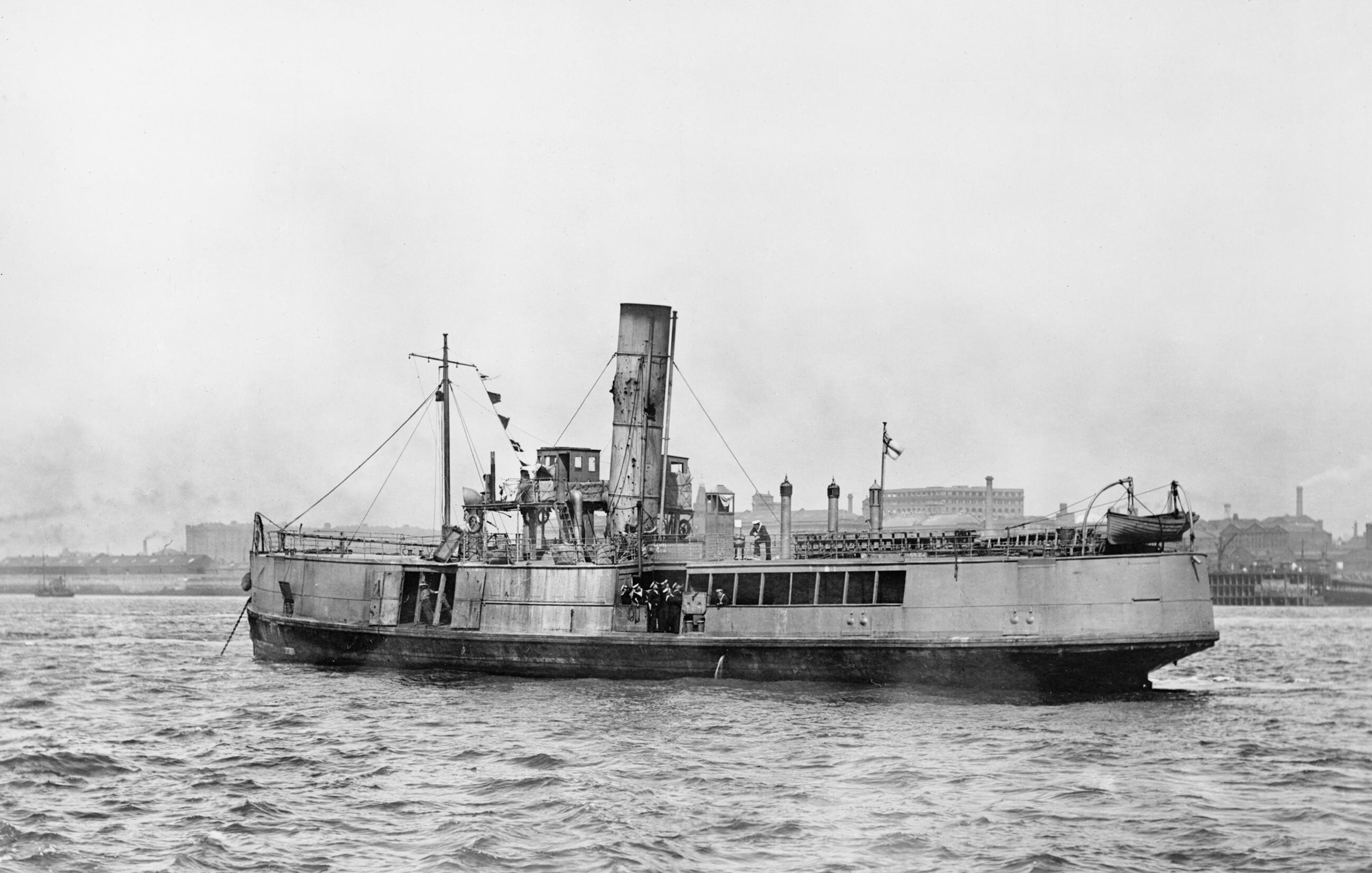
- Iris returns to Liverpool after the Zeebrugge Raid

History

United Kingdom
- Name: SS Iris (1906-1918); HMS Iris II (1918); SS Royal Iris (1918-1947); SS Blarney (1947-)
- Owner: Wallasey Corporation; Palmers. Dublin (1931); Cork Harbour Commissioners (1946)
- Builder: Robert Stephenson and Company, Newcastle upon Tyne
- Launched: 1906
- Christened: Iris (1906-1918); HMS Iris II (1918); Royal Iris (1918-1946); Blarney (1946-1961)
- Identification: UK Official Number 123971
- Fate: Scrapped 1961

General characteristics
- Tonnage: 491 gross register tons (GRT)
- Length: 159 ft (48 m)
- Draught: 8 ft 6 in (2.59 m)
- Propulsion: Steam engine, 2 shafts
- Capacity: 1,735 passengers

SS Royal Iris was a Mersey Ferryboat built in 1906 for Wallasey Corporation. She was built as Iris for service on the River Mersey. In 1918 she was requisitioned by the Royal Navy for action during the Zeebrugge Raid. She was renamed Royal Iris in recognition of her part in this action and returned to civilian duties. She was sold in 1931 and renamed Blarney in 1946. She was scrapped in December 1961.

== History ==
=== Pre war ===
Iris was built by Robert Stephenson & Sons of Newcastle. She was launched in 1906 and completed in June 1906. She was put into service as one of the Mersey ferries operating between Liverpool and Wallasey.

=== Zeebrugge Raid ===
In 1918 Iris was requisitioned by the Royal Navy to take part in the Zeebrugge Raid, being renamed HMS Iris II. On St George's Day 23 April 1918, Iris along with another Mersey ferry, Daffodil, was towed across the English Channel to Zeebrugge by Vindictive. Embarked were four platoons - known as "A" Company (or "The Chatham Company") of the Fourth Battalion of Royal Marines, and a storming party of sailors - known as "D" Company - commanded by Major Eagles and Lieutenant Commander George Nicholson Bradford respectively. They were supported by two Vickers machine-gun sections and two Stokes mortar crews.

When the ship neared the Zeebrugge Mole she cast the two ferries aside. Iris endeavoured to pull up to the mole under heavy fire in order to off-load the raiding parties which were on board. The first attempt failed as the grapple-hooks were not large enough. Two naval officers, Lieutenant Commander Bradford and Lieutenant Hawkings bravely climbed ashore and under heavy fire attempted to secure the ship. Both were killed and Bradford received a posthumous Victoria Cross.

Iris continued to sustain heavy fire and at one point a shell burst through the deck into an area where 56 marines were preparing to land. 49 were killed and the rest seriously injured.

After the war, a brass plaque, listing those who died aboard the Iris was mounted on the vessel. When she was decommissioned, the plaque was given to the Imperial War Museum collection.

=== Return to Liverpool ===
Iris and Daffodil returned to the Mersey on 17 May 1918, to a heroes' welcome. After repairs at Chatham, both vessels returned to service on the Mersey.

=== Post war ===
After the raid, she was renamed Royal Iris on command of King George V and returned to the Mersey. In 1923 she was converted for use as a cruise ship, and in October 1931 she was sold to Palmer's of Dublin. In 1946 she was sold again, to the Cork Harbour Commissioners, and renamed Blarney. She was eventually sold for scrap at Passage West in December 1961.
