= SS Royal Daffodil II =

History
- Name: 1934–1957: Royal Daffodil II; 1957–1962: St. Hilary
- Owner: 1934–?: Wallasey Corporation
- Operator: 1934–1939: Wallasey Corporation; 1939–1940: Royal Navy; 1940–?: Wallasey Corporation
- Route: 1934–?: Mersey Ferry
- Builder: Cammell Laird, Birkenhead, United Kingdom
- Launched: 30 May 1934
- Out of service: 1962
- Fate: Broken up

SS Royal Daffodil II was a Mersey ferry, built in 1934 to provide passenger ferry service across the River Mersey in England. In 1957, she was renamed the St. Hilary, and she was broken up in 1962.

Royal Daffodil II was constructed by Cammell Laird at Birkenhead and entered service in 1934. She was named after her predecessor, the SS Royal Daffodil, which had gained the "Royal" prefix for her service in the First World War. The Roman 'II' was added to her name because of the previous Royal Daffodil retained that name when she was sold on for further service on the River Thames in 1934.

Between October 1939 and 1940, the Royal Daffodil II was requisitioned by the Royal Navy for use as an air target. She was subsequently hit by a bomb during the May Blitz and sank at her berth at Seacombe on 8 May 1941. She was later raised and returned to service by 1943, with little of her pre-war splendour.

In 1957, the Royal Daffodil II was renamed the St. Hilary, thus making her original name available for use by her successor, which entered service in 1958. In 1962 she was sold for scrap to Van Heyghen Frères of Ghent in Belgium.
