= Royal Daffodil (2025) =

Mersey Ferry

- Royal Daffodil on regular service, 5 November 2026

History
- Name: Royal Daffodil
- Owner: Mersey Ferries
- Operator: Mersey Ferries
- Port of registry: Liverpool, United Kingdom
- Builder: Cammell Laird, England
- Cost: £26 million
- Laid down: 10 January 2025
- Launched: 6 November 2025
- Maiden voyage: 22 September 2026
- In service: 05 October 2026
- Identification: IMO number: 1056408
- Status: In service

General characteristics
- Type: Ferry
- Displacement: 760 tons
- Length: 49.80 m (163 ft 5 in)
- Beam: 12.00 m (39 ft 4 in)
- Draught: 4.35 m (14 ft 3 in)
- Propulsion: 2 x propellers
- Speed: 17 knots (trials); 12 knots (service speed)

MV Royal Daffodil is a Mersey Ferry serving on the River Mersey, England. She is the first ferry built for the river service since 1962.

== Background and construction ==
In January 2018, plans for a new Mersey Ferry were proposed, but were put on hold in May 2018. The project was shelved until March 2022, when Mayor of the Liverpool City Region, Steven Rotheram, gave the greenlight again to build the new ship, though a builder had yet to be appointed. Cammell Laird was subsequently selected to build the vessel.

Royal Daffodil was laid down at Cammell Laird's shipyard on 10 January 2025, and her name was announced the same day. The placing of the funnel on 27 June marked a milestone of completion of the vessel. She is the sixth Mersey Ferry to share this name, but the first one to be completed under that name. She is estimated to cost about £26 million, and was designed to both be modern, while still retaining the traditional style of the older ferries with the red funnel and black hull.

The ship was wheeled to the river's edge, where she was eventually floated out from the rising tide on 6 November, where she was then towed to the Birkenhead Basin for outfitting.

Sea Trials commenced on 16 April, and resumed the following day. She continued to run various trials until the end of September.

On 12 of August, Mersey Ferries began a contest for passengers to win free tickets for the maiden voyage of the Royal Daffodil, which was announced to take place on 26 September the same day. Despite this, the maiden voyage was held on 22 September as well as a naming ceremony despite the thick fog on the river that day.

On the 05 October 2026 She entered in to daily service with the 07:20 Seacombe commuter sailing. Services were then suspended on the same week, 09 October, and the Snowdrop suffered an engine failure the following evening. Mersey Ferries had to hire buses as commuter replacement until 03 November when the Royal Daffodil re-entered service.

She is the largest ferry on the Mersey operating, being larger than the Snowdrop, and the now retired Royal Iris of the Mersey.
