= MV Royal Daffodil (1939) =

British passenger ship

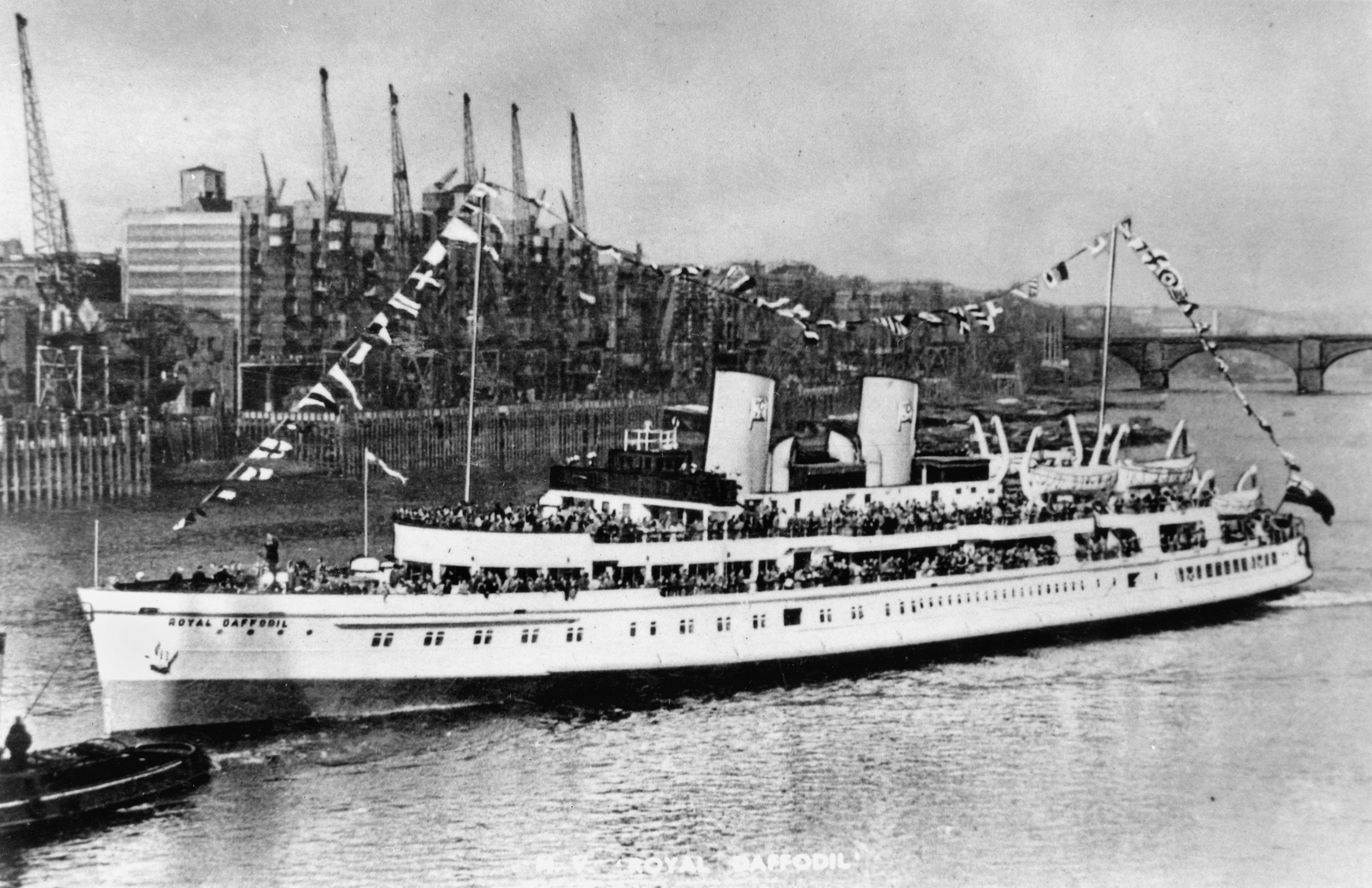
- Royal Daffodil in the Upper Pool, London

History

United Kingdom
- Name: MV Royal Daffodil
- Owner: General Steam Navigation Co. Ltd.
- Operator: General Steam Navigation Co. Ltd
- Port of registry: London
- Builder: William Denny and Sons, Dumbarton.
- Yard number: 1330
- Launched: 24 January 1939
- Completed: May 1939
- In service: 1939
- Identification: Official Number: 167210; Code Letters GSGL
- Fate: Scrapped 1967

General characteristics
- Tonnage: 2,060 GRT
- Length: 299 ft 7 in (91.31 m)
- Beam: 50 ft 1 in (15.27 m)
- Depth: 9 ft 9 in (2.97 m)
- Propulsion: 2 x SCSA diesel engines (Wm Denny & Bros Ltd, Dumbarton) 841 hp (627 kW), Twin screws
- Speed: 21 knots (39 km/h)
- Capacity: 2,073 passengers

MV Royal Daffodil was built in 1939 and scrapped in 1967. In the late 1950s and early to mid 1960s she was used for "no passport" trips to France, which enabled people to drink outside normal licensing hours as these did not apply at sea.

== History ==
Royal Daffodil was launched in 1939, the third ship to carry that name. The first was a Mersey ferry built in 1906 as Daffodil and taken over by the Royal Navy during World War I, playing a key role in the Zeebrugge Raid of 1918. She was subsequently granted the Royal prefix by King George V for her war service. She was sold in October 1933 to the New Medway Steam Packet Co. Ltd, where she was used on the Rochester-Strood-Sheerness-Southend route. When she was sold for scrap in 1938 in Ghent, Belgium, after the New Medway company was taken over by the General Steam Navigation Company of London in 1936, they replaced her with a larger vessel, which her owners named Royal Daffodil. In the meantime on the Mersey, Wallasey Corporation built a replacement vessel in 1934, which had to be given a II suffix as Royal Daffodil II.

The ship, built for continental trips from Tower Pier, commenced her service on 28 April 1939 with a sailing to Calais. On the outbreak of World War II in September 1939 she was quickly requisitioned by the Sea Transport Department of the Board of Trade.

=== World War II service ===
Initially she was used for the evacuation of some 4000 women and children from London and Thames Estuary to East Anglia. From 15 September 1939, Royal Daffodil was used to carry troops of the British Expeditionary Force (BEF) from Southampton to Cherbourg, continuing on this duty until October that year.

On 21 May 1940 Royal Daffodil was placed on standby to take part in evacuating the BEF if it became necessary. On 23 May, Royal Daffodil along with the passenger steamer Archangel carried troops of the 30th Brigade to Calais. She was one of the ships that took part in Operation Dynamo, the Dunkirk evacuation in 1940. She rescued 9,500 men in seven trips. On 2 June 1940, a bomb passed straight through her and exploded under her. The explosion caused a hole in the starboard side, and the Master ordered everyone to port side, which raised the hole out of the water and enabled a temporary patch of mattresses and wood to be applied. Royal Daffodil made it safely to Ramsgate and disembarked the evacuees. Later she was sailed to Deptford under her own power for permanent repairs. As well as the bomb, Royal Daffodil also survived machine gun and torpedo attacks.

For the remainder of the war, Royal Daffodil ran between Stranraer and Larne, carrying military personnel. In 1945, despite the end of the war, she was retained by the Board of Trade, covering military requirements between Dover and Calais, and between Newhaven and Dieppe, until January 1947. During her wartime service she was estimated to have carried almost 2,444,000 service personnel and covered some 170,000 NM (310,000 km; 200,000 mi).

=== Post-war ===
After the war, Royal Daffodil was refitted by her builders, and then used on sailings from Gravesend or Tilbury to view the French coast, also calling at Southend and Margate after a few seasons on this route. From 1954, with passports and 1955 without passports, passengers were again able to land in France.

Paul Lincoln, who managed The 2i's Coffee Bar, used the Daffodil between 1957 and 1963 for live Rock and Skiffle musical entertainment, with performers such as Gene Vincent in 1962, and Jerry Lee Lewis in 1963. In the summer of 1960, the licensed grocers, W H Cullen, hired the ship to take its staff downriver to Margate as an anniversary celebration. Unfortunately, the musical excursions proved unprofitable and in 1966 Royal Daffodil made her last crossing.

She was sold for scrapping in Ghent in 1967, making her last journey to the breakers along the Ghent-Terneuzen Canal under her own power. This event was shown on BBC TV.

== Official number and code letters ==
Royal Daffodil had the UK Official Number 167210 and used the Code Letters GSGL.
