= MV Royal Iris of the Mersey =

Cross-river ferry and ship canal cruise

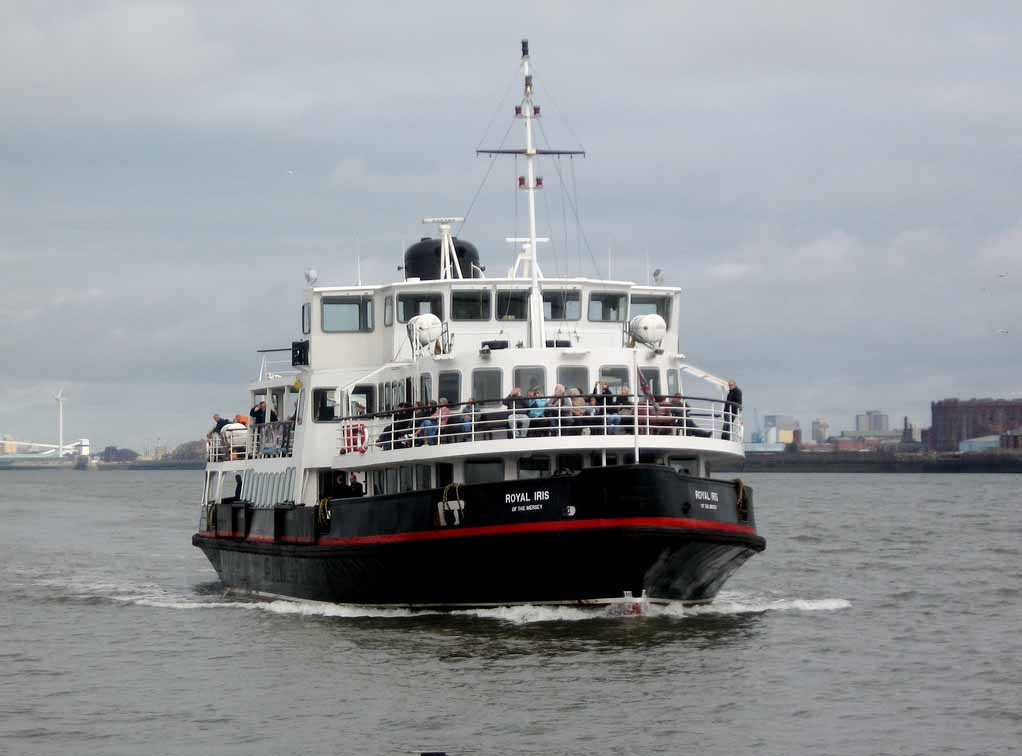
- Royal Iris of the Mersey

History

- Name: 1959–2001: Mountwood; 2001–2026: Royal Iris of the Mersey
- Owner: 1959–1968: Birkenhead Corporation; 1968–2026: Merseytravel
- Operator: 1959–1968: Birkenhead Corporation; 1968–1990: Merseytravel; 1990–2026: Mersey Ferries
- Port of registry: 1959–2026: Liverpool, United Kingdom
- Route: River Mersey Ferry
- Ordered: November 1957
- Builder: Philip and Son, Dartmouth
- Laid down: 20 October 1958
- Launched: 6 July 1959
- Christened: 6 July 1959
- Maiden voyage: 1960, delivery voyage from Dartmouth to the River Mersey.
- In service: 1960 - 2026
- Out of service: 2026
- Identification: Call sign: MHWA3; IMO number: 8633712; MMSI number: 235024007
- Status: Retired

General characteristics
- Tonnage: 611 GT
- Length: 46.32 m (152 ft 0 in)
- Beam: 12.2 m (40 ft 0 in)
- Draught: 2.46 m (8 ft 1 in)
- Decks: 4
- Installed power: 2 x Wärtsilä medium speed diesel engines
- Speed: max 12–14 knots (22–26 km/h; 14–16 mph)
- Capacity: 860 for general ferry operations, 360 for cruising
- Crew: 6

Royal Iris of the Mersey is a former Mersey Ferry which operated on the River Mersey, England. From launch in Devon in 1959 until a major refurbishment in 2001, she was named Mountwood.

== Mountwood ==
The Mountwood was the slightly older sister ship of the Woodchurch. Both ferries were built for the Corporation of Birkenhead to replace the existing fleet of 1930s steamers. The designs of the two new vessels were loosely based on the ferries Leasowe and Egremont of the Wallasey Corporation; they were designed by the same company, Graham and Woolnough, and were built at the same shipyard, Philip and Son of Dartmouth. Mountwood was launched by Mrs Hugh Platt on 6 July 1959 into the River Dart, and after being fitted out was delivered to the Mersey in 1960. She was named after an overspill post-war housing development of Birkenhead.

The Mountwood and her identical sister Woodchurch originally had bright orange funnels with a black base and black soot buffer. On the main deck, there was a forward, heated shelter and also a main saloon, aft of this was the toilets and machine space. Below was a saloon bar. On the top deck was a large open promenade and a forward shelter beneath the bridge, although this shelter was open beneath the bridge so it was often breezy and cold. They had a main central wheelhouse and two side cabs, and power came from two medium speed Crossley 8-cylinder diesel engines. Upon the bridge deck, in the wheelhouse, one would find the large brass helm and steering pedestal, a binnacle, and two conjoined Chadburn Synchrostep engine order telegraphs. These were linked to the other two identical telegraphs in the docking cabs so they moved in tandem. There was also whistle controls and lighting controls. In the docking cabs or navigation boxes was another binnacle, a whistle control and also various indicators for engine/speed etc. Originally all ferries had a simple ship to shore communicating radio, but did not have radar or sonar. The wheelhouses of the two ferries differed slightly due to different positioning of rudder angle indicators and engine RPM gauges in the bridge wings. The telegraphs were designed to give the captain direct control of the engines (although they could still be used in the traditional signal / response manner) and as such were marked with commands such as 'brake'and 'start'. They also had more speed settings ahead and astern. The original engines could reach full speed within 3 seconds once 'run' had been passed.

In her early years Mountwood was an unreliable ship, breaking down several times whilst crossing the river and having to anchor. In May 1961, she suffered a main engine failure, with her passengers having to be rescued by Woodchurch. She also collided with Bidston whilst berthing, due to a communications error. The new Mountwood had two options of engine control. The first was direct control, where the bridge telegraphs controlled the engines directly, without the assistance of an engineer at the control board. The second option was the traditional system of telegraph orders between the engineers and the engines. On this day, the Mountwood was operating in the traditional way. It seemed as though the duty engineer carried out the wrong order and started the engines in the wrong direction resulting in a collision. There should have been a 'wrong way' alarm which sounded however either the engineer failed to hear it or, for some reason, it was not working.

The Mountwood remained in operation up until she was withdrawn for refurbishment in 1989. She was rewired, internally refurbished and her bridge wheelhouse and cabs were plated over to form one large navigation bridge, although she retained all the original equipment. The original Crossley engines were retained but heavily overhauled and the central saloon saw modifications in the form of a cafe. The most noticeable change was the colour of the funnel, flame red and black, harking back to the 1920s Birkenhead steamships. The new 'Mersey Ferries' logo was painted on each side of the funnel. The Mountwood returned to service in July 1990 and remained in operation up until 2001 when she was withdrawn from service for a major refit. Her only major work during the period 1990–2001 was the addition of a shelter abaft the bridge, which also had a small bridge deck area. The black band on the funnel was reduced and the logo resized giving the ferry a small looking funnel.

== Major refit ==
In 2001, the Mountwood was withdrawn and taken to Birkenhead's former Cammell Laird shipyard (which became owned by A&P), and then to Clarence graving docks, where she was stripped of her fittings and parts of her superstructure were removed and rebuilt. The ferry remained dormant for some time due to problems at the shipyard. She was then re-engined and rebuilt. Noticeable changes were the addition of a new, angle fronted, large wheelhouse and bridge deck, plus her funnel, which was reinstated after the refit, was moved further back to fit with the position of the new engines. Her central saloons were also extended to the full width of the ship. She looks quite similar the Woodchurch's refit to Snowdrop. The vessels original helm and central binnacle were reinstated and some of the other bridge items are now in Mersey Ferries' collection. In May 2011 the ferry's nameplate was replaced and it now carried the words 'Royal Iris' in Birkenhead Corporation style script font.

== Royal Iris of the Mersey ==
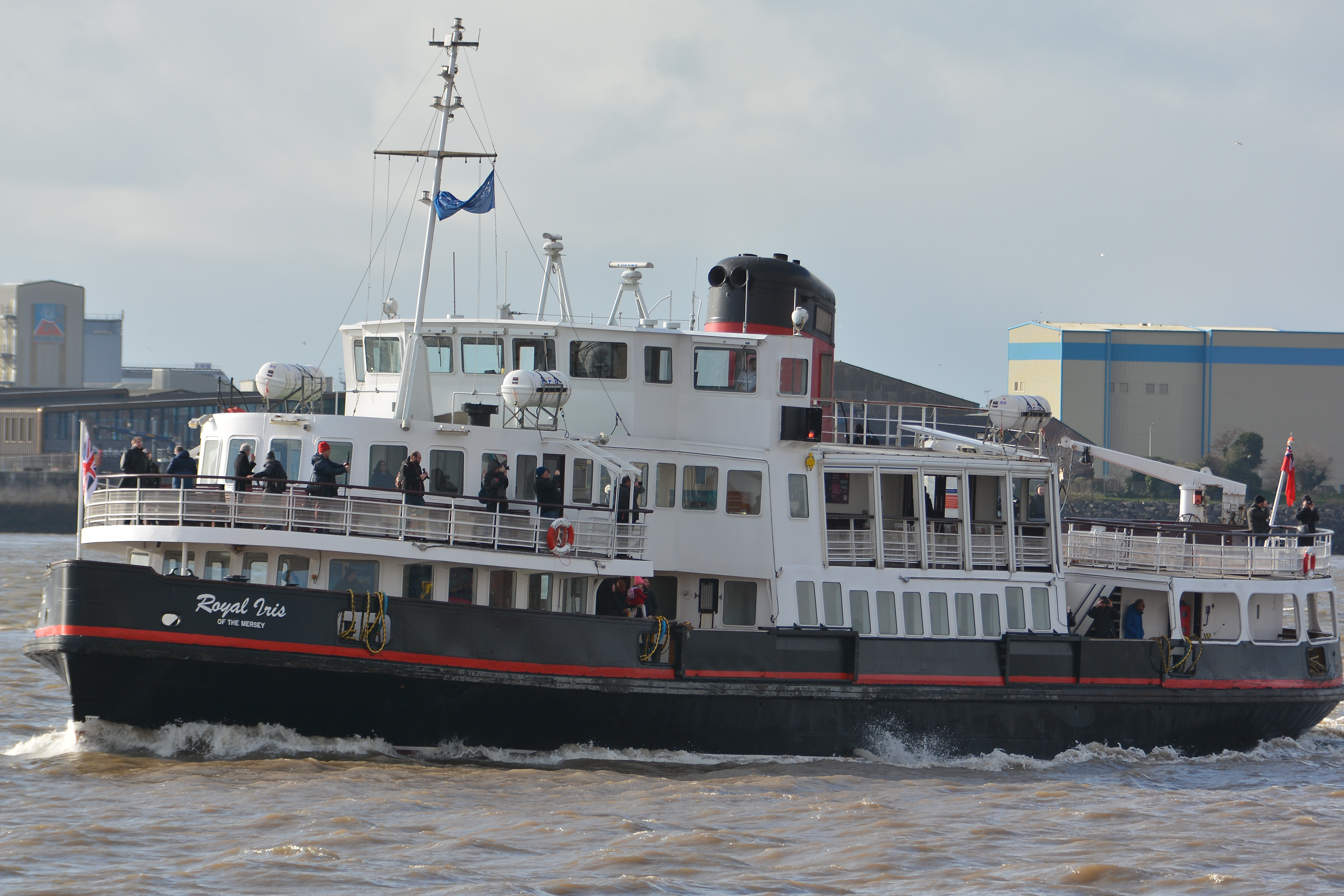
Royal Iris of the Mersey in February 2020

Royal Iris of the Mersey was a regular vessel used on both cross-river ferry services and also Manchester Ship Canal cruises. The ferry has a top speed of 12 knots (22 km/h; 14 mph). The ferry could not be named just "Royal Iris" as the previous vessel of that name Royal Iris was still listed on Lloyd's Register of Shipping. The ferry still retains many features from her days as Mountwood including the original pair of Kockums Supertyfon fog horns, as does her sister ship.

Since her major refit in 2001, ongoing maintenance has been completed, including refurbishments to her saloons and the replacement of the timber decking on the top deck.

It was retired on 29 March 2026 with the introduction of the new Royal Daffodil. It was reported that she had carried 17 million passengers during her 66 years of service.

== Incidents ==
The vessel has been involved in other incidents aside from the collision with Bidston. She had a complete engine failure due to a faulty fuel pump and had to anchor in the river when she was brand new.

On 10 July 2016, she struck an underwater obstruction and took on water whilst waiting for another vessel to leave the entrance to the Manchester Ship Canal. All 75 passengers and crew were safely evacuated from the ship on to the dredger Deo Gloria.

== In popular culture ==
The Mountwood was used in the film Ferry Cross The Mersey, a musical named after the Gerry & The Pacemakers song. It also appeared in the opening titles for the television series, The Liver Birds.
