= MV Snowdrop =

Ferry operating on the River Mersey, England

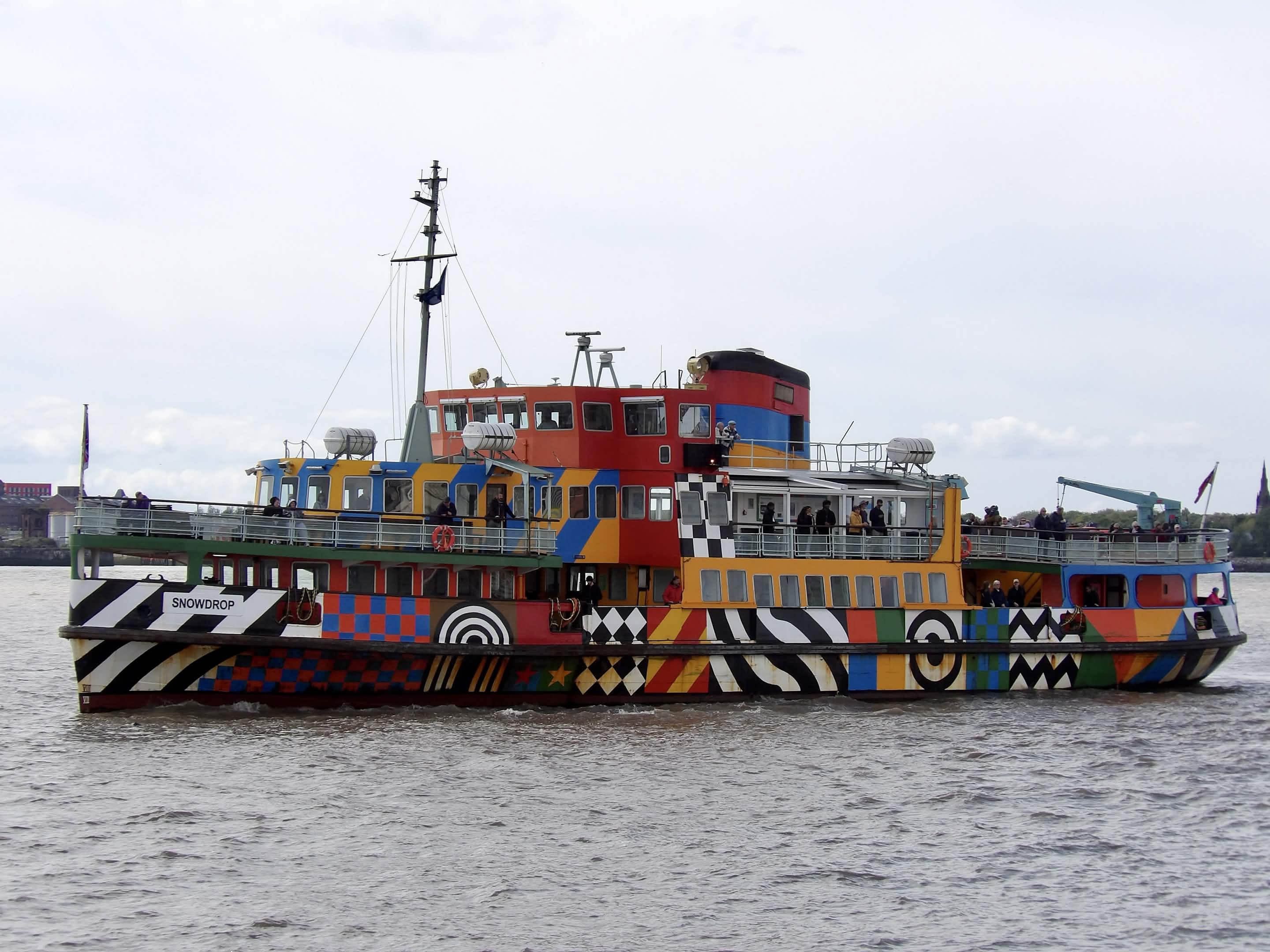
- MV Snowdrop in dazzle

History
- Name: 1959–2004: Woodchurch; 2004–present: Snowdrop
- Owner: 1959–1968: Birkenhead Corporation; 1969–present: Merseytravel
- Operator: 1959–1968: Birkenhead Corporation; 1968–1990: Merseytravel; 1990–present: Mersey Ferries
- Port of registry: 1959–present: Liverpool, United Kingdom
- Ordered: November 1957
- Builder: Philip and Son, Dartmouth
- Yard number: 1305
- Launched: October 1959
- Christened: October 1959
- Maiden voyage: Delivery voyage to the River Mersey from Dartmouth, 1960.
- In service: 1960
- Out of service: 1980–1983
- Identification: IMO number: 8633724
- Status: In service

General characteristics
- Class & type: IV with seasonal III
- Tonnage: 617 GT
- Length: 46.32 m (152 ft 0 in)
- Beam: 12.2 m (40 ft 0 in)
- Draught: 2.46 m (8 ft 1 in)
- Decks: 4 - bridge deck, promenade deck, main deck & lower deck/machine space
- Installed power: 2 × Wärtsilä diesel engines
- Speed: 12 knots (22 km/h; 14 mph)
- Capacity: 860 on general ferry operations, 360 on cruising duties
- Crew: 6 – captain, mate, engineer, deck hands x 2 and catering assistant

MV Snowdrop is a Mersey Ferry in operation on the River Mersey, England. From launch until a major refit in 2004, she was named MV Woodchurch.

== MV Woodchurch ==
The Woodchurch was the sister ship of the MV Mountwood. Both ferries were built for Birkenhead Corporation and were based loosely on the designs of the Wallasey ferries Leasowe and Egremont. They were built by the same company, Messrs. Philip & Son Ltd. of Dartmouth and designed by naval architects Graham and Woolnough. There was some local surprise when the contract was awarded to Philip & Son because Cammell Laird Shipbuilders were "next door" to the Birkenhead Ferry Terminal and it was thought that Lairds would automatically build the new ferry boats. However, their price was not considered competitive.

Named after an overspill post-war housing development of Birkenhead, the Woodchurch was the second of the new Birkenhead diesel ferries. Launched by Gwendoline M. McRonald, wife of the Birkenhead Transport Committee Chairman, Charles S. McRonald M.B.E., her hull left the Noss slipway at 3:45 pm and into the River Dart on Thursday 29 October 1959. Other Birkonian dignitaries attending the launch were Mrs Louisa Baker, Mayor of Birkenhead and Alderman Hugh Platt, Leader of the Council and the Mayor of Dartmouth was present. In the evening there was a formal dinner at the Grand Hotel, Torquay.

After fitting out and sea trials, the ferry was delivered to the Mersey in 1960. The Woodchurch was a popular ship. She was externally and internally identical to the Mountwood. The vessel was 152 ft long (46 m), with a beam of 40 ft (12 m), gross tonnage of 464 and a passenger capacity of 1,200 passengers.

She was given Birkenhead Corporation's orange and black livery. The Woodchurch was powered by two medium speed Crossley diesel engines, which were fitted with air brakes for rapid speed change and could be controlled directly from the bridge via the three pairs of connected Chadburn Synchrostep engine order telegraphs.

The Woodchurch remained in near constant operation up until 1980 when she was withdrawn from service and laid up in Morpeth Dock for reasons of economy. Up until this period there had been minimal maintenance work carried out on the vessel and at one point she even lost the forward port side rubbing strake. She was put up for sale, but no buyer was found. During this time she was cannibalised for parts to keep the other ferries running. By 1983, the ferry was re-painted and overhauled and returned to passenger service.

Alongside her sister, the vessel was withdrawn from service for extensive refurbishment in 1989. The six-month absence from the river was the result of a major rebuild and life extension programme. During this, her bridge wings and wheelhouses were plated over to form one single bridge. Curiously she retained all her original navigation equipment. She returned to service in July 1990.

== MV Snowdrop ==
The Woodchurch was again withdrawn in 2003. The ferry's superstructure was totally removed and replaced. New engines and electrical equipment were installed. The original funnel of Woodchurch was found to be suffering from rust upon removal, so a new funnel was installed on the vessel She was relaunched in 2004. A few months later it was revealed that she would be renamed Snowdrop, alongside the Royal Iris of the Mersey and Royal Daffodil. This renewed a 125-year-old link with the past, with all Mersey ferries now carrying traditional Wallasey "flower" names. The ferry's redesign was not as well received as her two sisters. There appears to be stark contrast between the ships original fine lines and the harsh welding of the Mersey Heritage Ship Repair contractors. The ferry has a large square and box like wheelhouse which does not follow the contours of the ship.

In December 2007, the Snowdrop featured in the Liverpool Nativity, which was broadcast live on BBC Three and repeated on BBC One. Gerry Marsden also made a cameo appearance as the ferry's captain. The ferry is the regular boat used on the Manchester Ship Canal cruises, held over most weekends during the summer months.

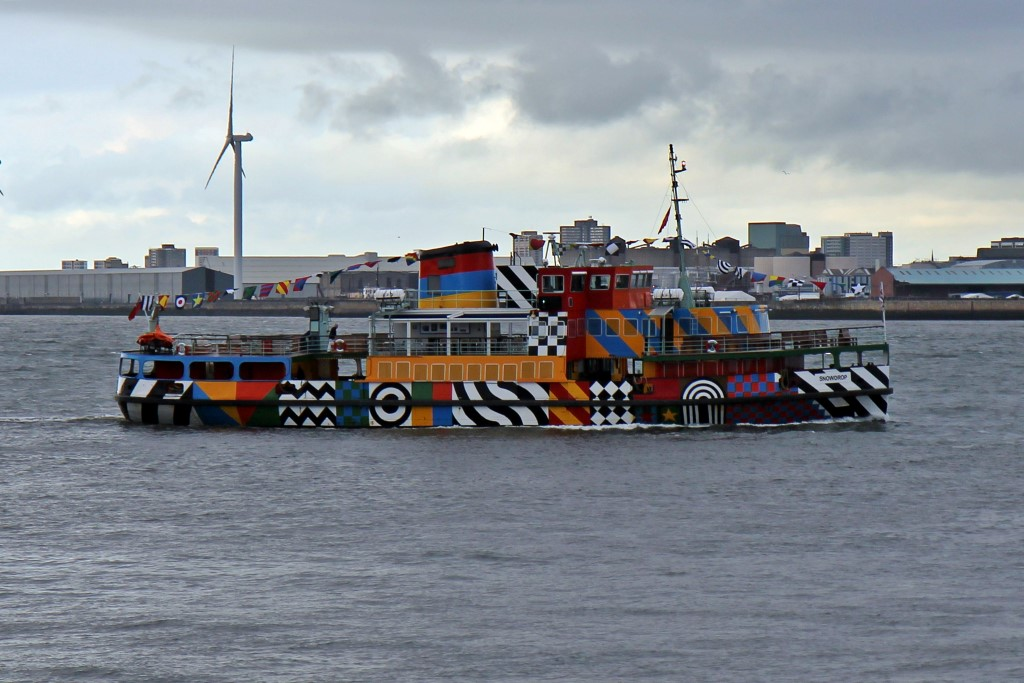
MV Snowdrop in dazzle livery, in May 2015, departing from Seacombe

In January 2015, the ferry was selected as a "dazzle ship"; she was given a unique new livery inspired by the First World War dazzle camouflage. Designed by Sir Peter Blake and entitled Everybody Razzle Dazzle, the livery was commissioned by Liverpool Biennial, 14-18 NOW and Tate Liverpool. Snowdrop is one of three vessels commissioned to carry a dazzle livery, the others being Induction Chromatique à Double Fréquence pour l'Edmund Gardner Ship / Liverpool. Paris, 2014 by Carlos Cruz-Diez on the museum ship Edmund Gardner located in the Canning graving dock adjacent to the Pier Head in Liverpool, and Tobias Rehberger's Dazzle Ship London on HMS President in the River Thames. Snowdrop is the only one of these three vessels to be a working vessel.
