= USS Daffodil =

US navy sidewheel steamer

History

United States
- Name: USS Daffodil
- Namesake: The well-known single-flowered plant.
- Owner: B. C. Terry
- Acquired: 17 November 1862
- Fate: Sold on 13 March 1867

General characteristics
- Class & type: Sidewheel Tug
- Displacement: 173 tons
- Length: 110 ft 6 in (33.68 m)
- Beam: 22 ft 6 in (6.86 m)
- Draught: 5 ft 6 in (1.68 m)
- Propulsion: Steam
- Speed: 8 kts.
- Complement: 35 officers and enlisted
- Armament: 2 20-pdr. rifle

USS Daffodil was a side-wheel steamer in the United States Navy.

Daffodil was built as Jonas Smith by B. C. Terry at Keyport, New Jersey, in 1862. She was purchased at New York 17 November 1862 and fitted out at New York Navy Yard.

== Service record ==
Assigned to duty with the South Atlantic Blockading Squadron, Daffodil sailed 24 November 1862, Acting Master L. G. Crane in command. From her arrival at Port Royal, South Carolina on 10 December 1862 until the end of the war she served as tug in the coastal waters of South Carolina and Georgia. Her services were characterized by Admiral Samuel Francis Du Pont as invaluable. On 8 September 1863 she towed 25 of the boats in the assault on Fort Sumter. From 27 November to 29 December 1864 she took part in the successful Army-Navy expedition up Broad River to destroy the Charleston and Savannah Railroad Bridge near Pocotaligo, South Carolina. On 27 January 1865 she made a reconnaissance up the Ashepoo River and on 9 February joined in a successful engagement with enemy batteries in the Togodo River.

=== Prizes ===
Date	Prize Name	Gross Proceeds	Costs and Expenses	Amount for Distribution	Where Adjudicated	Sent to 4th Auditor for Distribution	Vessels Entitled to Share
13 May 1863	Wonder	$3,627.85	$966.01	$2,661.84	Philadelphia	2 Feb 1865	Daffodil, Detachment from Wabash
12 Mar 1864	General Sumter						
14 Mar 1864	Hattie Brock						

=== Officers assigned ===
Tug Daffodil	January 1863
Rank	Name
Acting Master	E. M. Baldwin
Acting Master's Mate	Francis Such
Acting Master's Mate	S. C. Bishop
Acting Second Assistant Engineer	J. P. Rossman
Acting Third Assistant Engineer	Geo. Cunningham
Steamer Daffodil	January 1864
Rank	Name
Acting Ensign	F. W. Sanborn
Acting Master's Mate	J. C. Wentworth
Acting Master's Mate	C. L. Weedon
Acting Master's Mate	T. E. Harvey
Acting Master's Mate	D. Lester
Acting Second Assistant Engineer	T. W. Dee
Acting Third Assistant Engineer	Wm. Fisher
Acting Third Assistant Engineer	W. F. Henderson
Fourth-Rate Daffodil	January 1865
Rank	Name
Acting Master	Wm. H. Mallard
Acting Ensign	John McGlathery
Acting Master's Mate	N. B. Walker
Acting Third Assistant Engineer	Wm. H. Capen
Acting Third Assistant Engineer	Thomas Forrest
Acting Third Assistant Engineer	John Tucker

=== Post war ===
After the American Civil War Daffodil joined the newly organized North Atlantic Squadron and was stationed at Port Royal, South Carolina, until sold at Savannah, Georgia on 13 March 1867.
