= SS Royal Daffodil =

Mersey ferry (1906-1938)

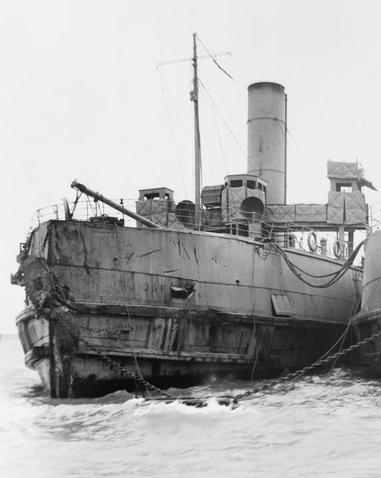
- Daffodil at Dover soon after the Zeebrugge Raid

History

United Kingdom
- Name: SS Daffodil (1906–1918); HMS Daffodil (1918); SS Royal Daffodil (1918–1938)
- Owner: Wallasey Corporation; New Medway Steam Packet Co. Ltd.(October 1933); General Steam Navigation Co. Ltd. (1936)
- Builder: Robert Stephenson and Company, Newcastle upon Tyne.
- Yard number: 101
- Launched: 20 April 1906
- Christened: Daffodil; HMS Daffodil (1918); Royal Daffodil (1918)
- Completed: June 1906
- In service: 1906
- Out of service: 1938
- Identification: UK Official Number 123974
- Fate: Scrapped 1938

General characteristics
- Displacement: 482 GRT
- Length: 159 ft (48.46 m)
- Depth: 8 ft 6 in (2.59 m)
- Propulsion: Twin screw, triple expansion, by D Rollo & Sons.
- Capacity: 1,735 passengers

SS Royal Daffodil was a Mersey ferry, built in 1906 and scrapped in 1938. She was built as Daffodil but renamed Royal Daffodil in recognition of her service under requisition during the 1st World War.

== History ==
=== Pre war ===
Daffodil was built by Robert Stephenson & Sons as yard number 101. She was launched on 20 April 1906 and completed in June 1906. She was put into service as one of the Mersey ferries operating between Liverpool and Wallasey.

=== Zeebrugge Raid ===
In 1918, she was requisitioned for war service and became HMS Daffodil. Her sister ship Iris was also requisitioned and became HMS Iris II. In preparation for the Zeebrugge Raid which aimed to deny the Germans further use of the port as a u-boat base, both ships were stripped of all furniture and fittings and had armour fitted to the superstructure. The ferries were chosen because of their shallow draught and double hulls. Daffodil's role was to carry two of the three seamen demolition parties, known as "C" Company and commanded by Lieutenant Cecil Dickinson, specifically tasked with using explosives for demolition work. The original plan was for the demolition team to embark the Iris, but on the day they embarked the Daffodil instead.

Both the Iris and the Daffodil were towed across the English Channel by HMS Vindictive for the operation on 23 April 1918. As the attack unfolded, Daffodil was hit in the engine room by two shells, but was able to maintain her position holding Vindictive against the wall of the Mole. One member of the ship's crew died during the raid.

=== Return to Liverpool ===
Iris and Daffodil returned to the Mersey on 17 May 1918, to a heroes' welcome. After repairs at Chatham, both vessels returned to service on the Mersey.

=== Post war ===
After the raid, she was renamed Royal Daffodil on command of King George V and returned to the Mersey, bearing shrapnel marks from the raid. In 1932 she succeeded PS Royal Iris on excursion work and in 1934 Royal Daffodil was sold to the New Medway Steam Packet Co. (NMSPC). She was used on the Rochester – Strood – Sheerness – Southend route. The NMSPC was taken over by the General Steam Navigation Co. Ltd. in 1936 and in 1938 Royal Daffodil was sold for scrapping in Belgium.
