= Grosvenor UK Poker Tour =

Series of regional poker tournaments

- Current season, competition or edition: 2026
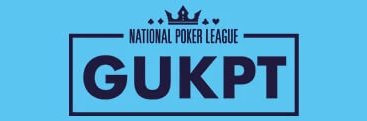
- Game: Texas Hold'em
- Founded: 2007
- Administrator: Grosvenor Casino
- Region: United Kingdom
- 3 times winner's: (England) Julian Thew (England) Benjamin Winsor (England) Richard Trigg
- Streaming partner: http://www.youtube.com/@GrosvenorPoker
- Sponsors: Grosvenor Casinos, GGPoker
- Website: https://www.grosvenorcasinos.com/poker/live-poker/gukpt

The Grosvenor UK Poker Tour is a major series of regional poker tournaments held across the United Kingdom run by Grosvenor Casinos, a UK based casino chain operated by The Rank Group. The Grosvenor UK Poker Tour was established in 2007, returning for subsequent seasons in 2008, 2009, 2010, 2011, 2012, 2013, 2014 and 2015.

The 2012 season was to see the GUKPT host an event abroad for the first time. A tournament was scheduled to take place in Dublin, Ireland but was later cancelled. A new tournament was arranged in Blankenberge, Belgium though it only managed to attract 95 entrants. Subsequent seasons have not featured tournaments outside the United Kingdom.

In October 2021, 888poker signed an agreement with Grosvenor Casinos with the aim of promoting the online poker room even further in live events under the 888pokerLIVE brand.

== Tournament results ==
=== Season 1 (2007 Tour) ===
Date/Local	Event/Buy-in	Entires	Prize Pool	Winner	Prize	Results
12-14 Jan; Grosvenor Casinos Bolton	(England) GUKPT Bolton £1,050	197	£197,000	(England) Praz Bansi	£75,000	
15-18 Feb; Grosvenor Casinos Walsall	(England) GUKPT Walsall £1,050	360	£360,000	(England) Jerome Bradpiece	£121,600	
22-25 Mar; Grosvenor Casinos Cardiff	(Wales) GUKPT Cardiff £1,050	314	£305,800	(England) Michael Greco	£97,680	
24-27 Apr; Grosvenor Casinos Manchester	(England) GUKPT Manchester £1,050	285	£285,000	(Wales) Dave Colclough	£88,300	
17-20 May; Grosvenor Casinos Marine Point	(England) GUKPT Brighton £1,050	315	£315,000	(England) Dave Smith	£105,100	
19-22 Jul; Grosvenor Casinos Newcastle	(England) GUKPT Newcastle £1,050	205	£205,000	(England) Mazhar Nawab	£66,000	
9-12 Aug; Grosvenor Casinos Luton	(England) GUKPT Luton £1,050	314	£324,000	(England) Dave Clark	£107,300	
6-9 Sep; Grosvenor Casinos Plymouth	(England) GUKPT Plymouth £1,050	179	£179,000	(England) Julian Thew	£59,500	
16-20 Oct; Grosvenor Casinos The Victoria	(England) GUKPT London £1,050	433	£433,000	(Canada) Leo Kam	£119,590	
15-18 Nov; Grosvenor Casinos Blackpool	(England) GUKPT Blackpool £1,050	353	£353,000	(Republic of Ireland) Paul Bracken	£109,700	
29 Nov-2 Dec; Grosvenor Casinos The Victoria	(England) GUKPT London Grand Finale £3,150	198	£594,000	(England) Michael Ellis	£197,600	

GUKPT Player of The Year 2007 - (England) Dave Smith

=== Season 2 (2008 Tour) ===
Date/Local	Event/Buy-in	Entires	Prize Pool	Winner	Prize	Results
17-20 Jan; Grosvenor Casinos Marine Point	(England) GUKPT Brighton £1,060	280	£280,000	(England) Julian Thew	£89,950	
14-17 Feb; Grosvenor Casinos Walsall	(England) GUKPT Walsall £1,060	287	£287,000	(England) Jeff Kimber	£83,910	
6-9 Mar; Grosvenor Casinos The Victoria	(England) GUKPT London £1,060	424	£424,000	(England) Ketul Nathwani	£119,780	
24-27 Apr; Grosvenor Casinos Manchester	(England) GUKPT Manchester £1,060	309	£309,000	(England) Marc Goodwin	£90,420	
15-18 May; Grosvenor Casinos Newcastle	(England) GUKPT Newcastle £1,060	189	£189,000	(England) Ganesh Rao	£57,175	
7-10 Aug; Grosvenor Casinos Luton	(England) GUKPT Luton £1,060	376	£376,000	(England) Sam Trickett	£109,050	
4-7 Sep; Grosvenor Casinos Bolton	(England) GUKPT Bolton £1,060	175	£175,000	(Republic of Ireland) Tony Cascarino	£52,850	
16-19 Oct; Grosvenor Casinos Thanet	(England) GUKPT Thanet £1,060	226	£226,000	(England) Andrew Teng	£68,380	
13-16 Nov; Grosvenor Casinos Blackpool	(England) GUKPT Blackpool £1,060	341	£341,000	(Scotland) Brian Clarke	£96,500	
26-29 Nov; Grosvenor Casinos The Victoria	(England) GUKPT London Grand Finale £3,150	184	£552,000	(Republic of Ireland) Paul Foltyn	£167,050	
4 Dec; Grosvenor Casinos Luton	(England) GUKPT Champion of Champions; Freeroll £75,000 Prizepool by Blue Square (Betfair)	87	£75,000*	(England) Arshad Hussain	£20,000	

* GUKPT Champion of Champions - 4 December 2008 is an invitational freeroll tournament for all winners of GUKPT main or side event in the 2008 season and Blue Square (Betfair) offer £75,000 for the Prizepool. Qualify by winning any GUKPT event. Wins in buy-ins upto £300 give 5,000 chips, more than £300 7,000 chips, £1,000 main events 10,000 chips and £3,000 grand final 15,000 chips. Totals combined to a maximum of 25,000 chips per player.

=== Season 3 (2009 Tour) ===
Date/Local	Event/Buy-in	Entires	Prize Pool	Winner	Prize	Results
15-19 Jan; Grosvenor Casinos Marine Point	(England) GUKPT Brighton £1,060	235	£235,000	(England) Bernard Litman	£70,520	
26 Feb-1 Mar; Grosvenor Casinos Walsall	(England) GUKPT Walsall £1,060	301	£301,000	(England) Sunny Chattha	£88,150	
26-29 Mar; Grosvenor Casinos The Victoria	(England) GUKPT London £1,575	398	£597,000	(Republic of Ireland) Martin Silke	£172,850	
23-26 Apr; Grosvenor Casinos Bury	(England) GUKPT Manchester £1,060	298	£298,000	(England) Simon Moorman	£88,630	
21-24 May; Grosvenor Casinos Newcastle	(England) GUKPT Newcastle £1,060	151	£151,000	(England) Tony Phillips	£47,200	
6-9 Aug; Grosvenor Casinos Luton	(England) GUKPT Luton £1,060	304	£304,000	(England) Richard Gryko	£88,850	
3-6 Sep; Grosvenor Casinos Cardiff	(Wales) GUKPT Cardiff £1,060	120	£120,000	(England) Karl Mahrenholz	£38,700	
15-18 Oct; Grosvenor Casinos Thanet	(England) GUKPT Thanet £1,060	132	£132,000	(England) Darren Annis	£41,900	
12-15 Nov; Grosvenor Casinos Blackpool	(England) GUKPT Blackpool £1,060	287	£287,000	(England) Priyan de Mel	£84,900	
26-29 Nov; Grosvenor Casinos The Victoria	(England) GUKPT London Grand Finale £3,150	183	£549,000	(Republic of Ireland) Tony Cascarino	£168,800	
5-6 Dec; Grosvenor Casinos Luton	(England) GUKPT Champion of Champions; Freeroll £100,000 Prizepool	125	£100,000*	(Scotland) Haitao "Colin" Wu	£25,000	
GUKPT 2009 Summer Series
13-14 Jun; Grosvenor Casinos Bolton	(England) Bolton Summer £550	77	£38,500	(England) Kevin Parkes	£12,700	
20-21 Jun; Grosvenor Casinos Aberdeen	(Scotland) Aberdeen Summer £550	42	£21,000	(Scotland) John Angus	£7,870	
27-28 Jun; Grosvenor Casinos Walsall	(England) Walsall Summer £550	121	£60,500	(England) Vince Price	£19,520	
29-30 Aug; Grosvenor Casinos Coventry	(England) Coventry Summer £330	84	£24,900	(France) Thomas Besnier	£8,200	

* GUKPT Champion of Champions - 6-7 December 2009 is an invitational freeroll tournament for all winners of GUKPT main or side event in the 2009 season and Grosvenor Casinos and Blue Square (Betfair) offer £100,000 for the Prizepool

=== Season 4 (2010 Tour) ===
Date/Local	Event/Buy-in	Entires	Prize Pool	Winner	Prize	Results
22-24 Jan; Grosvenor Casinos Bolton	(England) GUKPT Bolton £1,070	146	£146,000	(England) Priyan de Mel	£44,600	
25-28 Feb; Grosvenor Casinos Walsall	(England) GUKPT Walsall £1,070	206	£206,000	(England) Colin McTaggart	£57,700	
25-28 Mar; Grosvenor Casinos The Victoria	(England) GUKPT London £1,590	318	£477,000	(Vietnam) Cuong Tran	£127,800	
22-25 Apr; Grosvenor Casinos Bury	(England) GUKPT Manchester £1,070	192	£192,000	(England) Kuljinder Sidhu	£54,850	
21-23 May; Grosvenor Casinos Coventry	(England) GUKPT Coventry £1,070	142	£142,000	(England) Stuart Rutter	£41,910	
12-15 Aug; Grosvenor Casinos Luton	(England) GUKPT Luton £1,070	229	£229,000	(England) Neil Channing	£64,050	
8-10 Oct; Grosvenor Casinos Marine Point	(England) GUKPT Brighton £1,070	160	£160,000	(England) Paul Foltyn	£46,400	
11-14 Nov; Grosvenor Casinos Blackpool	(England) GUKPT Blackpool £1,070	246	£246,000	(England) David Johnson	£67,750	
25-28 Nov; Grosvenor Casinos The Victoria	(England) GUKPT London Grand Finale £2,625	207	£517,500	(Vietnam) Luong-Huu Bui	£144,905	
4-5 Dec; Grosvenor Casinos Coventry	(England) GUKPT Champion of Champions; Freeroll £150,000 Prizepool	153	£150,000*	(England) Luke Fields	£44,250	
GUKPT 2010 Summer Series
30-31 May; Grosvenor Casinos Thanet	(England) Thanet Summer £330	44	£13,200	(England) Ricky Mackintosh	£4,620	
30-31 May; Grosvenor Casinos Blackpool	(England) Blackpool Summer £330	49	£24,500	(England) Mick Fletcher	£8,570	
12-13 Jun; Grosvenor Casinos Aberdeen	(Scotland) Aberdeen Summer £330	33	£9,900	(England) Deborah Masson	£3,670	
12-13 Jun; Grosvenor Casinos Luton	(England) Luton Summer £550	53	£26,500	(England) Graham Pound	£8,740	
26-27 Jun; Grosvenor Casinos Newcastle	(England) Newcastle Summer £330	66	£19,800	(England) Hugh Frew	£6,340	
26-27 Jun; Grosvenor Casinos Walsall	(England) Walsall Summer £550	39	£19,500	(England) Stephen Thomson	£7,220	
23-24 Jul; Grosvenor Casinos Dundee	(Scotland) Dundee Summer £330	41	£12,300	(England) Norman Levitt	£4,310	
24-25 Jul; Grosvenor Casinos Sheffield	(England) Sheffield Summer £550	56	£28,000	(England) Luke Fields	£9,250	
29-30 Aug; Grosvenor Casinos The Victoria	(England) London Summer £810	134	£100,500	(England) Michalis Michael	£27,500	
29-30 Aug; Grosvenor Casinos Bury	(England) Manchester Summer £550	55	£27,500	(England) Lee Atherton	£9,080	
GUKPT 2010 Club Championships
13 Feb; Grosvenor Casinos Thanet	(England) Thanet Club £220	42	£8,400	(England) Anthea Jordan	£3,150	
13 Feb; Grosvenor Casinos Leeds Merrion	(England) Leeds Club £220	10	£2,000	(England) Chris Johnson	£1,400	
13 Feb; Grosvenor Casinos Swansea	(Wales) Swansea Club £220	38	£7,600	(Wales) Roger Harvey	£3,040	
13 Feb; Grosvenor Casinos Blackpool	(England) Blackpool Club £220	19	£3,800	(England) Gary Holden	£1,900	
10 Apr; Grosvenor Casinos Dundee	(Scotland) Dundee Club £220	29	£5,800	(Scotland) Paul Henderson	£2,320	
10 Apr; Grosvenor Casinos Southampton	(England) Southampton Club £220	84	£16,800	(England) David Miles	£5,210	
10 Apr; Grosvenor Casinos Stoke-on-Trent	(England) Stoke Club £220	16	£3,200	(England) Craig Freeman	£1,600	
10 Apr; Grosvenor Casinos Bolton	(England) Bolton Club £220	50	£10,000	(England) James Wood	£3,300	
10 Jul; Grosvenor Riverside, Salford	(England) Salford Club £220	24	£4,800	(England) Simon Wolf	£2,400	
10 Jul; Grosvenor Casinos Coventry	(England) Coventry Club £220	18	£3,600	(England) Nigel Hill	£1,800	
10 Jul; Grosvenor Casinos The Victoria	(England) London Club £220	134	£26,800	(England) Jack McDermott	£8,100	
10 Jul; Grosvenor Casinos Sheffield	(England) Sheffield Club £220	9	£1,800	(England) Guy Johnson	£900	
10 Jul; Grosvenor Casinos Newcastle	(England) Newcastle Club £220	37	£7,400	(England) Nicholas Ramsey	£2,740	
10 Jul; Grosvenor Casinos Cardiff	(Wales) Cardiff Club £220	8	£1,600	(England) Francis Pippin	£1,120	
16 Oct; Grosvenor Great Yarmouth	(England) Great Yarmouth Club £220	43	£8,600	Andrew Moyse	£2,920	
16 Oct; Grosvenor Casinos Aberdeen	(Scotland) Aberdeen Club £220	43	£8,600	(Scotland) James Garioch	£2,920	
16 Oct; Grosvenor Casinos Luton	(England) Luton Club £220	63	£12,600	(England) Dean Morris	£4,040	
16 Oct; Grosvenor Casinos Bury	(England) Manchester Club £220	44	£8,800	(England) Mike Fisher	£2,990	
16 Oct; Grosvenor Casinos Portsmouth	(England) Portsmouth Club £220	22	£4,400	(England) Stuart Keyte	£1,760	
23 Oct; Grosvenor Casinos Huddersfield	(England) Huddersfield Club £220	14	£1,800	(England) Nigel Ventre	£1,400	
23 Oct; Grosvenor Casinos Plymouth	(England) Plymouth Club £220	43	£8,600	(England) Mark Greaves	£2,920	
23 Oct; Grosvenor Casinos Walsall	(England) Walsall Club £220	31	£6,200	(Scotland) David Allan	£2,360	
23 Oct; Grosvenor Casinos Marine Point	(England) Brighton Club £220	10	£2,000	(England) Kishani Mithani	£1,400	

* GUKPT Champion of Champions - 4-5 December 2010 is an invitational freeroll tournament for who had won GUKPT or Summer Series Main or side events, online 10% Series tournaments, Club Championships or who had topped the National Poker League in the 2010 season and Grosvenor Casinos offer £150,000 for the Prizepool

=== Season 5 (2011 Tour) ===
Date/Local	Event/Buy-in	Entires	Prize Pool	Winner	Prize	Results
27–30 Jan; Grosvenor Casinos Bury	(England) GUKPT Manchester £1,070	207	£207,000	(England) Peter McAdams	£58,100	
17-19 Mar; Grosvenor Casinos The Victoria	(England) GUKPT London £1,650	245	£367,500	(England) Praz Bansi	£101,020	
29 Apr-1 May; Grosvenor Casinos Walsall	(England) GUKPT Walsall £1,070; Guaranteed Prize Pool £50,000	172	£172,000	(England) Alan Mansbridge	£50,000	
19-21 Aug; Grosvenor Casinos Luton	(England) GUKPT Luton £1,070	212	£212,000	(England) Charles Chattha	£59,360	
22-28 Ago; Grosvenor Casinos Coventry	(England) GUKPT GOLIATH £120; Guaranteed Prize Pool £200,000	1,765	£176,500	(England) Lee Rawson	£32,705	
9-16 Oct; Grosvenor Casinos Coventry	(England) GUKPT Coventry £1,070; Coventry Main Event	145	£145,000	(England) Julian Thew	£42,740	
6-13 Nov; Grosvenor Casinos Blackpool	(England) GUKPT Blackpool £1,070	262	£262,000	(England) Andrew Peters	£72,020	
1-4 Dec; Grosvenor Casinos The Victoria	(England) GUKPT London £2,625	195	£487,500	(Germany) Fabian Quoss	£119,996	
GUKPT 2011 Summer Series
13-15 May; Grosvenor Casinos Dundee	(Scotland) Dundee Summer £550	27	£15,000	(Scotland) Lewis Fowler	£5,550	
13-15 May; Grosvenor Casinos Marine Point	(England) Brighton Summer £550	59	£32,000	(England) David Mcconachie	£10,240	
9-11 Jun; Grosvenor Casinos Plymouth	(England) Plymouth Summer £550	25	£12,500	(England) James Wilson	£5,000	
9-11 Jun; Grosvenor Casinos Bolton	(England) Bolton Summer £550	42	£21,000	(England) Steve Holden	£7,140	
7-10 Jul; Grosvenor Casinos Southampton	(England) Southampton Summer £550	65	£32,500	(England) Christopher Webber	£10,390	
7-10 Jul; Grosvenor Casinos Sheffield	(England) Sheffield Summer £550	46	£23,000	(England) Michael Arnot	£7,820	

=== Season 6 (2012 Tour) ===
Date/Local	Event/Buy-in	Entires	Prize Pool	Winner	Prize	Results
27–29 Jan; Grosvenor Casinos Bury	(England) GUKPT Manchester £1,070	171	£171,000	(Scotland) Lewis Hunter	£49,600	
16-18 Mar; Grosvenor Casinos Walsall	(England) GUKPT Walsall £1,070; Guaranteed Prize Pool £50,000	153	£153,000	(Sweden) Daniel Haglund	£45,100	
13-15 Apr; Grosvenor Casinos Stockton	(England) GUKPT Stockton £550	73	£36,500	(England) Allan Peers	£11,000	
27-29 Apr; Grosvenor Casinos Thanet	(England) GUKPT Thanet £550	67	£33,500	(England) Albert Sapiano	£10,720	
11-13 May	(Republic of Ireland) GUKPT Dublin	CANCELLED				
7-10 Jun; Grosvenor Casinos Blankenberge	(Belgium) GUKPT Blankenberge €1,070	97	€94,090	(Belgium) Arne Coulier	€29,165	
6-8 Jul; Grosvenor Casinos Plymouth	(England) GUKPT Plymouth £550	76	£38,000	(England) Rod Albright	£11,900	
8-11 Aug; Grosvenor Casinos Bolton	(England) GUKPT Bolton £550	114	£57,000	(England) Ben Jones	£17,390	
20-27 Ago; Grosvenor Casinos Coventry	(England) GUKPT GOLIATH £120; Guaranteed Prize Pool £200,000	1,954	£200,000	(England) Leslie Fenton	£35,800	
20-27 Ago; Grosvenor Casinos Coventry	(England) GUKPT Coventry £1,070; Coventry Main Event	122	£122,000	(England) Martyn Frey	£36,610	
20-23 Sep; Grosvenor Casinos The Victoria	(England) GUKPT London £1,070	315	£315,000	(England) Robin Keston	£84,310	
19-21 Oct; Grosvenor Casinos Luton	(England) GUKPT Luton £1,070	155	£155,000	(England) Jamie O'Connor	£45,760	
9-11 Nov; Grosvenor Casinos Blackpool	(England) GUKPT Blackpool £1,070	173	£173,000	(England) Simon Deadman	£49,290	
30 Nov-2 Dec; Grosvenor Casinos The Victoria	(England) GUKPT London £2,625	137	£342,500	(England) Sam Grafton	£102,700	
12-13 Jan 2013; Grosvenor Casinos Luton	(England) GUKPT Champion of Champions; Freeroll £100,000 Prizepool	94	£100,000*	(Belgium) Serge Van Landeghem	£22,630	

* GUKPT Champion of Champions is an invitational freeroll tournament for all winners of GUKPT main or side event in the 2012 season and Grosvenor Casinos offer £100,000 for the Prizepool

=== Season 7 (2013 Tour) ===
Date/Local	Event/Buy-in	Entires	Prize Pool	Winner	Prize	Results
28 Feb–3 Mar; Grosvenor Casinos The Victoria	(England) GUKPT London £1,070	397	£397,000	(England) Martin Bader	£56,000	
26-28 Mar; Grosvenor Casinos Coventry	(England) GUKPT Student Championships; Coventry £35	469	£14,060	(England) Ben Foxwell	£3,540	
11–14 Apr; Grosvenor Casinos Didsbury	(England) GUKPT Didsbury £550; Guaranteed Prize Pool £50,000	137	£76,500	(England) Erimas Livonas	£22,570	
9–12 May; Grosvenor Casinos Stockton	(England) GUKPT Stockton £550; Guaranteed Prize Pool £50,000	116	£58,000	(England) Neil Raine	£17,690	
30 May–2 Jun; Grosvenor Casinos Portsmouth	(England) GUKPT Portsmouth £550; Guaranteed Prize Pool £50,000	134	£67,000	(England) Nicholas Humphris	£16,500	
20–23 Jun; Grosvenor Casinos Reading	(England) GUKPT Reading £550; Guaranteed Prize Pool £50,000	140	£85,200	(England) James Martin	£22,640	
11-14 Jul; Grosvenor Casinos Walsall	(England) GUKPT Walsall £550; Guaranteed Prize Pool £50,000	144	£86,000	(England) David Tighe	£24,910	
25-28 Jul; Grosvenor Casinos Marine Point	(England) GUKPT Brighton £550; Guaranteed Prize Pool £50,000	198	£99,000	(England) David Lloyd	£20,320	
8-11 Aug; Grosvenor Casinos Bolton	(England) GUKPT Bolton £550; Guaranteed Prize Pool £50,000	133	£66,560	(England) Michael Clarke	£20,000	
20-26 Aug; Grosvenor Casinos Coventry	(England) GUKPT GOLIATH £120; Guaranteed Prize Pool £200,000	2,568	£257,000	(England) Jake Skidmore	£29,690	
19-22 Sep; Grosvenor Casinos Manchester	(England) GUKPT Manchester £1,070; Guaranteed Prize Pool £200,000	180	£200,000	(England) Sunny Chattha	£35,000	
17-20 Oct; Grosvenor Casinos Luton	(England) GUKPT Luton £1,070; Guaranteed Prize Pool £200,000	262	£262,000	(England) Driton Haxhiaj	£42,750	
7-10 Nov; Grosvenor Casinos Blackpool	(England) GUKPT Blackpool £1,070; Guaranteed Prize Pool £200,000	226	£226,000	(England) Richard Trigg	£53,000	
21–24 Nov; Grosvenor Casinos The Victoria	(England) GUKPT London £2,125; Guaranteed Prize Pool £400,000	294	£587,300	(England) Kevin Allen	£158,700	

=== Season 8 (2014 Tour) ===
Date/Local	Event/Buy-in	Entires	Prize Pool	Winner	Prize	Results
6-9 Feb; Grosvenor Casinos The Victoria	(England) GUKPT London £1,090; Guaranteed Prize Pool £200,000	323	£323,000	(England) Oliver Price	£86,400	
2-9 Mar; Grosvenor Casinos	(England) GUKPT Manchester £1,080; Guaranteed Prize Pool £200,000	192	£200,000	(England) Rhys Jones	£42,000	
2-6 Apr; Grosvenor Casinos Maybury	(Scotland) GUKPT Edinburgh £550; Guaranteed Prize Pool £100,000	192	£100,000	(England) Andrew Teng	£26,000	
30 Apr-4 May; Grosvenor Casinos Marine Point Brighton	(England) GUKPT Brighton £550; Guaranteed Prize Pool £100,000	180	£100,000	(England) Chris Cousins	£20,300	
25 May-1 Jun; Grosvenor Casinos Walsall	(England) GUKPT Walsall £550; Guaranteed Prize Pool £100,000	196	£100,500	(England) Benjamin Winsor	£29,000	
30 Jun-6 Jul; Grosvenor Casinos Cardiff	(Wales) GUKPT Cardiff £550; Guaranteed Prize Pool £100,000	171	£100,000	(England) Vaidas Sirionas	£24,000	
28 Jul-3 Aug; Grosvenor Casinos Reading	(England) GUKPT Reading £550; Guaranteed Prize Pool £100,000	268	£134,000	(England) Paul Nunes	£29,200	
10-17 Aug; Grosvenor Casinos Coventry	(England) GUKPT GOLIATH £120; Guaranteed Prize Pool £250,000	3,394	£339,400	(England) Ryan Foster	£62,320	
31 Aug-7 Sep; Grosvenor Casinos Leeds	(England) GUKPT Leeds £550; Guaranteed Prize Pool £100,000	228	£114,000	(England) Harry Law	£32,500	
12-19 Oct; Grosvenor Casinos Luton	(England) GUKPT Luton £1,080; Guaranteed Prize Pool £200,000	219	£219,000	(England) Adam Reynolds	£53,500	
9-16 Nov; Grosvenor Casinos Blackpool	(England) GUKPT Blackpool £1,080; Guaranteed Prize Pool £200,000	171	£200,000	(England) Justin Astley	£59,000	
23–30 Nov; Grosvenor Casinos The Victoria	(England) GUKPT London £2,125; Guaranteed Prize Pool £400,000	212	£424,000	(England) Charlie Carrel	£108,625	

=== Season 9 (2015 Tour) ===
Date/Local	Event/Buy-in	Entires	Prize Pool	Winner	Prize	Results
29 Jan–1 Feb; Grosvenor Casinos The Victoria	(England) GUKPT London £1,090; Guaranteed Prize Pool £200,000	289	£289,000	(Russia) Victor Ilyukhin	£82,600	
12–15 Mar; Grosvenor Casinos Bury	(England) GUKPT Manchester £1,090; Guaranteed Prize Pool £200,000	198	£200,000	(England) Ali Mallu	£59,000	
23 Apr; Grosvenor Casinos Maybury	(Scotland) GUKPT Edinburgh £550	234	£117,000	(England) James Mitchell	£33,930	
28–31 May; Grosvenor Casinos Cardiff	(Wales) GUKPT Cardiff £550; Guaranteed Prize Pool £100,000	171	£100,000	(Wales) Julian Davies	£25,000	
25–28 Jun; Grosvenor Casinos Reading	(England) GUKPT Reading £550; Guaranteed Prize Pool £100,000	248	£123,510	(England) Raul Martinez	£25,250	
30 Jul–2 Aug; Grosvenor Casinos Leeds	(England) GUKPT Leeds £550; Guaranteed Prize Pool £100,000	249	£124,500	(England) Stephen Foster	£24,500	
8-16 Aug; Grosvenor Casinos Coventry	(England) GUKPT GOLIATH £120; Guaranteed Prize Pool £250,000	4,210	£421,000	(England) Miikka Toikka	£70,800	
17–20 Sep; Grosvenor Casinos Luton	(England) GUKPT Luton £1,090; Guaranteed Prize Pool £200,000	226	£226,000	(England) William Davies	£65,550	
12–15 Nov; Grosvenor Casinos Blackpool	(England) GUKPT Blackpool £1,090; Guaranteed Prize Pool £200,000	275	£275,000	(Scotland) Jonny Gray	£69,050	
26–29 Nov; Grosvenor Casinos The Victoria	(England) GUKPT London GRAND FINAL £2,125; Guaranteed Prize Pool £400,000	321	£642,000	(England) Benjamin Winsor	£178,600	

=== Season 10 (2016 Tour) ===
Date/Local	Event/Buy-in	Entires	Prize Pool	Winner	Prize	Results
24-31 Jan; Grosvenor Casinos The Victoria	(England) GUKPT London £1,100; Guaranteed Prize Pool £200,000	394	£394,000	(England) Martin Hogarty	£66,538	
28 Feb-6 Mar; Grosvenor Casinos Bury	(England) GUKPT Manchester £1,100; Guaranteed Prize Pool £200,000	232	£232,000	(England) Reyaaz Mulla	£58,300	
17-24 Apr; Grosvenor Casinos Reading	(England) GUKPT Reading £550; Guaranteed Prize Pool £100,000	240	£120,000	(England) Ryan Spittles	£31,100	
29 May-5 Jun; Grosvenor Casinos Walsall	(Wales) GUKPT Walsall £550; Guaranteed Prize Pool £100,000	241	£120,500	(Malaysia) Wai Kiat Lee	£34,850	
26 Jun-3 Jul; Grosvenor Casinos The Victoria	(England) GUKPT London £550; Guaranteed Prize Pool £100,000	419	£209,500	(United States) Brett Kennedy	£45,470	
28 Jul-7 Aug; Grosvenor Casinos Coventry	(England) GUKPT GOLIATH £120; Guaranteed Prize Pool £250,000	5,232	£523,200	(England) Vamshi Vandanapu	£62,750	
4-11 Sep; Grosvenor Casinos Maybury	(Scotland) GUKPT Edinburgh £550; Guaranteed Prize Pool £100,000	184	£100,000	(Poland) Tommy Lee	£25,000	
2-9 Oct; Grosvenor Casinos Luton	(England) GUKPT Luton £1,100; Guaranteed Prize Pool £200,000	240	£240,000	(England) Driton Haxhiaj	£61,520	
6-13 Nov; Grosvenor Casinos Blackpool	(England) GUKPT Blackpool £1,100; Guaranteed Prize Pool £200,000	251	£251,000	(England) Tom Middleton	£56,255	
20-27 Nov; Grosvenor Casinos The Victoria	(England) GUKPT London GRAND FINAL £2,125; Guaranteed Prize Pool £400,000	276	£552,000	(England) Marc Wright	£132,380	

=== Season 11 (2017 Tour) ===
Date/Local	Event/Buy-in	Entires	Prize Pool	Winner	Prize	Results
29 Jan-5 Feb; Grosvenor Casinos The Victoria	(England) GUKPT London £1,100; Guaranteed Prize Pool £200,000	435	£435,000	(England) Michael Zhang	£113,000	
26 Feb-5 Mar; Grosvenor Casinos Bury	(England) GUKPT Manchester £1,100; Guaranteed Prize Pool £200,000	268	£268,000	(England) Andrew Hills	£46,988	
26 Mar-2 Apr; Grosvenor Casinos Maybury	(Scotland) GUKPT Edinburgh £550; Guaranteed Prize Pool £100,000	227	£113,420	(Scotland) Paul Green	£17,500	
23-30 Apr; Grosvenor Casinos Walsall	(England) GUKPT Walsall £550; Guaranteed Prize Pool £100,000	238	£119,000	(England) Gareth Howard	£28,845	
21-28 May; Grosvenor Casinos Reading	(England) GUKPT Reading £550; Guaranteed Prize Pool £100,000	247	£123,500	(England) Ali Mallu	£35,310	
25 Jun-2 Jul; Grosvenor Casinos The Victoria	(England) GUKPT London £550; Guaranteed Prize Pool £100,000	449	£224,552	(England) George Alexander	£50,000	
27 Jul-6 Aug; Grosvenor Casinos Coventry	(England) GUKPT GOLIATH £120; Guaranteed Prize Pool £250,000	6,385	£638,500	(England) Elliott Marais	£85,760	
10-17 Sep; Grosvenor Casinos Leeds	(England) GUKPT Leeds £550; Guaranteed Prize Pool £100,000	308	£154,000	(England) Leung Cheung	£37,900	
9-15 Oct; Grosvenor Casinos Luton	(England) GUKPT Luton £1,100; Guaranteed Prize Pool £200,000	239	£239,000	(England) John Eames	£68,350	
5-12 Nov; Grosvenor Casinos Blackpool	(England) GUKPT Blackpool £1,100; Guaranteed Prize Pool £200,000	314	£314,000	(England) Daniel Corbett	£87,280	
19-26 Nov; Grosvenor Casinos The Victoria	(England) GUKPT London GRAND FINAL £2,125; Guaranteed Prize Pool £400,000	304	£607,400	(Egypt) Ahmed Abdella	£89,000	

=== Season 12 (2018 Tour) ===
Date/Local	Event/Buy-in	Entires	Prize Pool	Winner	Prize	Results
28 Jan-4 Feb; Grosvenor Casinos The Victoria	(England) GUKPT London £1,110; Guaranteed Prize Pool £200,000	433	£433,000	(England) Andrew Hulme	£112,400	
25 Feb-4 Mar; Grosvenor Casinos Bury	(England) GUKPT Manchester £1,110; Guaranteed Prize Pool £200,000	241	£241,000	(England) Adam Lulat	£68,930	
22-29 Apr; Grosvenor Casinos Maybury	(Scotland) GUKPT Edinburgh £560; Guaranteed Prize Pool £100,000	258	£129,000	(England) Garry Stevens-Smith	£36,350	
3-10 June; Grosvenor Casinos Reading	(England) GUKPT Reading £560; Guaranteed Prize Pool £100,000	245	£122,500	anonymous	£35,100	
1-8 Jul; Grosvenor Casinos The Victoria	(England) GUKPT London £560; Guaranteed Prize Pool £100,000	358	£179,000	(England) Patrik Szabo	£49,150	
25 Jul-5 Aug; Grosvenor Casinos Coventry	(England) GUKPT GOLIATH £125; Guaranteed Prize Pool £250,000	7,584	£758,400	(Romania) Florian Duta	£101,450	
9-16 Sep; Grosvenor Casinos Leeds	(England) GUKPT Leeds £560; Guaranteed Prize Pool £100,000	302	£151,000	(England) Adam Owen	£41,950	
7-14 Oct; Grosvenor Casinos Luton	(England) GUKPT Luton £1,110; Guaranteed Prize Pool £200,000	304	£303,796	(New Zealand) Neil Mcfayden	£58,326	
4-11 Nov; Grosvenor Casinos Blackpool	(England) GUKPT Blackpool £1,110; Guaranteed Prize Pool £200,000	304	£304,000	(Cyprus) Yiannis Liperis	£84,250	
18-25 Nov; Grosvenor Casinos The Victoria	(England) GUKPT London GRAND FINAL £2,140; Guaranteed Prize Pool £400,000	325	£650,000	(France) Jerome L'Hostis	£140,445	

=== Season 13 (2019 Tour) ===
Date/Local	Event/Buy-in	Entires	Prize Pool	Winner	Prize	Results
27 Jan-3 Feb; Grosvenor Casinos The Victoria	(England) GUKPT London £1,100; Guaranteed Prize Pool £200,000	467	£457,600	anonymous	£100,000	
3-10 Mar; Grosvenor Casinos Bury	(England) GUKPT Manchester £1,100; Guaranteed Prize Pool £200,000	308	£301,840	(England) Benard Maregedze	£69,470	
31 March- 7 Apr; Grosvenor Casinos Maybury	(Scotland) GUKPT Edinburgh £560; Guaranteed Prize Pool £100,000	309	£198,771	(England) Nathan Slater	£42,110	
2-9 Jun; Grosvenor Casinos Luton	(England) GUKPT Luton £560; Guaranteed Prize Pool £100,000	382	£187,200	(England) Chris Louch	£50,550	
30- Jun-7 Jul; Grosvenor Casinos The Victoria	(England) GUKPT London £560; Guaranteed Prize Pool £100,000	488	£239,150	(England) Cheuk Lee	£40,554	
25 Jul-4 Aug; Grosvenor Casinos Coventry	(England) GUKPT GOLIATH £125; Guaranteed Prize Pool £250,000	9,300	£911,410	(England) Lee Reynolds	£64,601	
8-15 Sep; Grosvenor Casinos Leeds	(England) GUKPT Leeds £560; Guaranteed Prize Pool £100,000	382	£187,295	(England) Brett Angell	£20,912	
6-13 Oct; Grosvenor Casinos Luton	(England) GUKPT Luton £1,110; Guaranteed Prize Pool £200,000	307	£300,860	(England) Vikrum Mehta	£83,590	
3-10 Nov; Grosvenor Casinos Blackpool	(England) GUKPT Blackpool £1,110; Guaranteed Prize Pool £200,000	367	£365,000	(England) Matthew Eardley	£84,550	
16 Nov-1 Dec; Grosvenor Casinos The Victoria	(England) GUKPT London GRAND FINAL £2,650; Guaranteed Prize Pool £500,000	273	£668,850	(England) Benjamin Winsor	£188,610	

(England) Richard Kellett - 2019 Player of the Year, by his efforts he won: 2020 Diamond GUKPT Package + Grosvenor Casinos POY Trophy.

=== Season 14 (2020 Tour) ===
Date/Local	Event/Buy-in	Entires	Prize Pool	Winner	Prize	Results
23 Jan-2 Feb; Grosvenor Casinos The Victoria	(England) GUKPT London £1,500; Guaranteed Prize Pool £300,000	379	£511,650	(England) Artan Dedusha	£137,430	
23 Feb-1 Mar; Grosvenor Casinos Bury	(England) GUKPT Manchester £1,110; Guaranteed Prize Pool £200,000	317	£310,660	(England) Ben Dobson	£75,510	
22-29 Mar; Grosvenor Casinos Maybury	(Scotland) GUKPT Edinburgh £560; Guaranteed Prize Pool £100,000	CANCELLED - due to the COVID-19 pandemic ANNOUNCEMENT – MAJOR TOURNAMENTS MOVING ONLINE				
14-24 May; Grosvenor Casinos The Victoria	(England) GUKPT London £1,110; Guaranteed Prize Pool £100,000	CANCELLED - due to the COVID-19 pandemic ANNOUNCEMENT – MAJOR TOURNAMENTS MOVING ONLINE				
5-12 Jul; Grosvenor Casinos Luton	(England) GUKPT Luton £560; Guaranteed Prize Pool £100,000	CANCELLED - due to the COVID-19 pandemic ANNOUNCEMENT – MAJOR TOURNAMENTS MOVING ONLINE				
6-13 Sep; Grosvenor Casinos Leeds	(England) GUKPT Leeds £560; Guaranteed Prize Pool £100,000	CANCELLED - due to the COVID-19 pandemic ANNOUNCEMENT – MAJOR TOURNAMENTS MOVING ONLINE				
4-11 Oct; Grosvenor Casinos Luton	(England) GUKPT Luton £1,110; Guaranteed Prize Pool £200,000	CANCELLED - due to the COVID-19 pandemic ANNOUNCEMENT – MAJOR TOURNAMENTS MOVING ONLINE				
1-8 Nov; Grosvenor Casinos Blackpool	(England) GUKPT Blackpool £1,110; Guaranteed Prize Pool £200,000	CANCELLED - due to the COVID-19 pandemic ANNOUNCEMENT – MAJOR TOURNAMENTS MOVING ONLINE				
21 Nov-6 Dec; Grosvenor Casinos The Victoria	(England) GUKPT London GRAND FINAL	CANCELLED - due to the COVID-19 pandemic ANNOUNCEMENT – MAJOR TOURNAMENTS MOVING ONLINE				
NATIONAL ONLINE GUKPT SERIES 2020
21-29 Mar; Grosvenor Poker Online	GUKPT MARCH £560; Guaranteed Prize Pool £100,000	240	£120,000	(England) Paul Siddle "PaulSiddle"	£24,240	
2-10 May; Grosvenor Poker Online	GUKPT MAY £1,060; Guaranteed Prize Pool £100,000	150	£150,000	"LuckyLenny"	£34,500	
13-21 Jun; Grosvenor Poker Online	GUKPT JUNE £1,110; Guaranteed Prize Pool £100,000	126	£133,560	"houseteal65"	£32,722	
1-9 Aug; Grosvenor Poker Online	GOLIATH 2020 £125; Guaranteed Prize Pool £100,000	2,013	£231,495	(England) Gerard Barclay “WRDortmund7”	£42,248	
12-20 Sep; Grosvenor Poker Online	GUKPT SEPTEMBER £560; Guaranteed Prize Pool £80,000	119	£80,000	"RatLip"	£20,120	
10-18 Oct; Grosvenor Poker Online	GUKPT OCTOBER £560; Guaranteed Prize Pool £60,000	130	£68,900	"JOHAHINDI"	£16,880	

(England) John Bousfield - 2020 Player of the Year, by his efforts he won: 2021 Diamond GUKPT Package + Grosvenor Casinos POY Trophy.

=== Season 15 (2021 Tour) ===
NATIONAL ONLINE GUKPT SERIES 2021
Date/Local	Event/Buy-in	Entires	Prize Pool	Winner	Prize	Results
26-28 Feb; Grosvenor Poker Online	GUKPT FEBRUARY £530; Guaranteed Prize Pool £80,000	235	£117,500	(England) Robert Hallworth "jamsandwich"	£24,675	
20 Apr-2 May; Grosvenor Poker Online	GUKPT APRIL £530; Guaranteed Prize Pool £100,000	211	£105,500	(England) Guy Taylor "flora1978"	£22,155	
GUKPT LIVE EVENTS 2021
15-25 Jul; G Casinos The Poker Room	(England) GUKPT London £1,250; Guaranteed Prize Pool £200,000	591	£637,100	(England) Euan McNicholas	£165,800	
5-15 Ago; Grosvenor Casinos Bury	(England) GUKPT Manchester £1,250; Guaranteed Prize Pool £200,000	472	£508,800	(England) Richard Trigg	£134,250	
29 Ago-5 Sep; Grosvenor Casinos Coventry	(England) GUKPT Coventry £750	607	£406,690	(England) Steve Jelinek	£105,050	
16-18 Sep; Grosvenor Casinos Leeds	(England) GUKPT Leeds £750	439	£294,130	(England) Jack Hardcastle	£72,200	
30 Sep-3 Oct; Grosvenor Casinos Maybury	(Scotland) GUKPT Edinburgh £750	351	£235,170	(Scotland) Majid Iqbal	£61,220	
6-19 Oct; Grosvenor Casinos Luton	(England) GUKPT Luton £1,250	513	£564,300	(Scotland) David Docherty	£138,000	
28 Oct-7 Nov; Grosvenor Casinos Blackpool	(England) GUKPT Blackpool £1,250	533	£574,580	(England) Richard Horton	£94,150	
18 Nov-5 Dec; G Casinos The Poker Room	(England) GUKPT London Main Event £1,250	471	£518,100	(England) Jiaze Li	£62,500	
18 Nov-5 Dec; G Casinos The Poker Room	(England) GUKPT London GRAND FINAL £2,000	607	£1,092,600	(England) Trung Moc	£265,350	

(England) Euan McNicholas - 2021 Player of the Year, by his efforts he won: £20,000 Sponsorship Package + Grosvenor Casinos POY Trophy.

=== Season 16 (2022 Tour) ===
Date/Local	Event/Buy-in	Entires	Prize Pool	Winner	Prize	Results
27 Jan-6 Feb; G Casinos The Poker Room	(England) GUKPT London £1,250	702	£772,200	(Hong Kong) Timothy Chung	£185,560	
24 Feb-6 Mar; Grosvenor Casinos Coventry	(England) GUKPT Coventry £1,000	419	£374,400	(England) Joe Hindry	£93,460	
17-27 Mar; Grosvenor Casinos Bury	(England) GUKPT Manchester £1,250	526	£578,600	(England) Trevor Reardon	£141,100	
8-15 May; Grosvenor Casinos Maybury	(Scotland) GUKPT Edinburgh £750	390	£261,300	(Scotland) Gary Armstrong	£57,770	
26 May-5 Jun; Grosvenor Casinos Luton	(England) GUKPT Luton £1,250	341	£375,100	(England) Tom Hall	£90,965	
23 Jun-3 Jul; G Casinos The Poker Room	(England) GUKPT London £1,000	390	£351,000	(Australia) Jarrod Thatcher	£87,530	
17-24 Jul; Grosvenor Casinos Reading	(England) GUKPT Reading £1,000	346	£305,170	(England) Richard Trigg	£78,260	
25-Ago-4 Sep; Grosvenor Casinos Coventry	(England) GUKPT Coventry £1,000; Coventry Main Event	549	£494,100	(England) Jack Hardcastle	£125,450	
25-Ago-4 Sep; Grosvenor Casinos Coventry	(England) GUKPT GOLIATH £150; GUKPT Goliath 10th Anniversary by Grosvenor Poker	10,584	£1,219,310	(England) Kyle Jeffrey	£200,000	
22 Sep-2 Oct; Grosvenor Casinos Leeds	(England) GUKPT Leeds £1,000	430	£387,000	(England) Chris Johnson	£73,070	
7-16 Oct; Grosvenor Casinos Luton	(England) GUKPT Luton £1,250	353	£388,300	(England) Jamie Le	£95,630	
9-13 Nov; Grosvenor Casinos Blackpool	(England) GUKPT Blackpool £1,250	543	£597,300	(England) Jamie Clossick	£109,000	
1-18 Dec; G Casinos The Poker Room	(England) GUKPT London Main Event £1,250; London Main Event	347	£381,700	(England) Jamie Nixon	£93,970	
1-18 Dec; G Casinos The Poker Room	(England) GUKPT London GRAND FINAL £2,000; GUKPT LONDON GRAND FINAL 2022	328	£576,480	(England) Daniel Bedson	£105,000	

(England) Matthew Davenport - 2022 Player of the Year, by his efforts he won: £40,000 Sponsorship Package + Grosvenor Casinos POY Trophy.

=== Season 17 (2023 Tour) ===
Date/Local	Event/Buy-in	Entires	Prize Pool	Winner	Prize	Results
12-22 Jan; G Casinos The Poker Room	(England) GUKPT London £1,250	459	£475,750	(England) Jonathan McCann	£89,600	
2-12 Feb; Grosvenor Casinos Bury	(England) GUKPT Manchester £1,250	445	£460,950	(Italy) Calogero Morreale	£106,700	
16-26 Mar; Grosvenor Casinos Blackpool	(England) GUKPT Blackpool £1,250	305	£321,080	(England) Lin Chen	£66,310	
4-14 May; Grosvenor Casinos Maybury	(Scotland) GUKPT Edinburgh £1,000	366	£310,220	(Scotland) Ludovic Geilich	£79,590	
25 May-4 Jun; Grosvenor Casinos Luton	(England) GUKPT Luton £1,250	331	£343,550	(England) Christopher Day	£88,150	
27 Jul-6 Ago; Grosvenor Casinos Coventry	(England) GUKPT Coventry £1,000; Coventry Main Event	518	£470,000	(England) Matthew Davenport	£116,200	
27 Jul-6 Ago; Grosvenor Casinos Coventry	(England) GUKPT GOLIATH £150; GUKPT Goliath 10th Anniversary by Grosvenor Poker	11,493	£1,324,000	(England) Alex Todd	£176,860	
17-27 Aug; G Casinos The Poker Room	(England) GUKPT London £1,250	405	£423,372	(England) Weixiao Liao	£75,501	
14-24 Sep; Grosvenor Casinos Luton	(England) GUKPT Luton £1,250	223	£231,933	(England) Stuart Rutter	£62,368	
4-15 Oct; Grosvenor Casinos Leeds	(England) GUKPT Leeds £1,000	361	£305,844	(England) Kostas Patsourakis	£78,419	
9-19 Nov; Grosvenor Casinos Blackpool	(England) GUKPT Blackpool £1,250	347	£360,430	(England) Ian Gascoigne	£62,198	
23 Nov-3 Dec; G Casinos The Poker Room	(England) GUKPT London Midi M.E. £1,250; London Midi Main Event	375	£390,000	(England) Stephen Woodhead	£80,808	
23 Nov-3 Dec; G Casinos The Poker Room	(England) GUKPT London GRAND FINAL £2,000; GUKPT LONDON GRAND FINAL 2023	325	£555,600	(England) Paul Nunes	£140,000	

(Italy) Calogero Morreale - 2023 Player of the Year, by his efforts he won: £40,000 Sponsorship Package + Grosvenor Casinos POY Trophy.

=== Season 18 (2024 Tour) ===
Date/Local	Event/Buy-in	Entires	Prize Pool	Winner	Prize	Results
4-14 Jan; G Casinos The Poker Room	(England) GUKPT London £1,250	529	£552,625	(England) Luke Porter	£116,710	
1-11 Feb; Grosvenor Casinos Bury	(England) GUKPT Manchester £1,250	436	£454,400	(France) Vincent Meli	£83,897	
22 Feb-3 Mar; Grosvenor Casinos Coventry	(England) UK OPEN 2024 Coventry £1,500	620	£803,520	(England) Nick Marchington	£146,560	
10-17 Mar; Grosvenor Casinos Blackpool	(England) GUKPT Blackpool £1,250	207	£250,000	(Scotland) Ludovic Geilich	£56,150	
4-14 Apr; Grosvenor Casinos Maybury	(Scotland) GUKPT Edinburgh £1,000	184	£153,980	(Scotland) Paul McAulay	£34,810	
25 Apr-5 May; Grosvenor Casinos Luton	(England) GUKPT Luton £1,250	212	£218,870	(England) Chris Johnson	£48,570	
16-26 May; G Casinos The Poker Room	(England) GUKPT London £1,250	249	£257,940	(England) Ryan O'Donnell	£56,760	
30 May-9 Jun; Grosvenor Casinos Leeds	(England) GUKPT Leeds £1,000	192	£160,890	(England) James Jones	£36,150	
25 Jul-4 Ago; Grosvenor Casinos Coventry	(England) GUKPT Coventry £1,250; Coventry Main Event	632	£667,400	(Hong Kong) Justin Tsui	£100,000	
25 Jul-4 Ago; Grosvenor Casinos Coventry	(England) GUKPT GOLIATH £200; GUKPT Goliath 11th Anniversary by Grosvenor Poker	11,749	£1,804,640	(England) William Watkins	£166,058	
12-22 Sep; Grosvenor Casinos Luton	(England) GUKPT Luton £1,250	284	£299,910	(England) Seb Crane	£66,000	
30 Oct-10 Nov; Grosvenor Casinos Blackpool	(England) GUKPT Blackpool £1,250	299	£314,250	(United Kingdom) Ravi Sheth	£68,580	
21 Nov-1 Dec; G Casinos The Poker Room	(England) GUKPT London Midi Main Event £560; London Midi Main Event	247	£118,560	(Turkey) Yucel Eminoglu	£26,330	
21 Nov-1 Dec; G Casinos The Poker Room	(England) GUKPT London GRAND FINAL £1,100; GUKPT LONDON GRAND FINAL 2024	395	£415,620	(Republic of Ireland) Niall Campbell	£89,000	

(United Kingdom) Matthew Davenport - 2024 Player of the Year won: £75,000 Sponsorship Package + $10,000 worth of 888poker LIVE packages + Grosvenor Casinos POY Trophy.

=== Season 19 (2025 Tour) ===
Date/Local	Event/Buy-in	Entires	Prize Pool	Winner	Prize	Info
9-19 Jan; Grosvenor Casinos Coventry	(England) GUKPT Coventry LEG.1 £1,250; Main Event Guarantee Prizepool £250,000	386	£424,600	(England) Stefan Lazar	£70,830*	
30 Jan-9 Feb; Grosvenor Casinos Bury	(England) GUKPT Manchester LEG.2 £1,250; Main Event Guarantee Prizepool £250,000	437	£455,170	(China) Junxian Du	£84,700	
20 Feb- 2 Mar; Grosvenor Casinos Coventry	(England) UK OPEN 2025 Coventry £1,500; Main Event Guarantee Prizepool £1,000,000	951	£1,219,660	(England) Andrew Hulme	£219,720	
24 Apr-4 May; Grosvenor Casinos Luton	(England) GUKPT Luton LEG.3 £1,250; Main Event Guarantee Prizepool £250,000	284	£296,770	(Italy) Calogero Morreale	£56,720	
8-18 May; Grosvenor Casinos Leeds	(England) GUKPT Leeds LEG.4 £1,000; Main Event Guarantee Prizepool £200,000	247	£209,940	(England) Keith Littlewood	£40,440	
10-20 Jul; G Casinos The Poker Room	(England) GUKPT London The Vic LEG.5 £1,250; Main Event Guarantee Prizepool £250,000	429	£448,300	(England) Wantao Tang	£83,400	
24 Jul-3 Ago; Grosvenor Casinos Coventry	(England) GUKPT Coventry £1,250; Main Event Guarantee Prizepool £1,000,000	1,023	£1,069,030	(United Kingdom) Ravi Sheth	£192,700	
24 Jul-3 Ago; Grosvenor Casinos Coventry	(England) GOLIATH Coventry £200 £2,000,000 estimated	12,961	£1,970,070	(England) Paul Worsley	£316,640	
14-24 Ago; Grosvenor Casinos Luton	(England) GUKPT Luton LEG.6 £1,250; Main Event Guarantee Prizepool £250,000	231	£240,140	(England) Keith Johnson	£56,890	
9-19 Oct; Grosvenor Casinos Maybury	(Scotland) GUKPT Edinburgh LEG.7 £1,000; Main Event Guarantee Prizepool £150,000	231	£197,920	(Scotland) Bryan Taylor	£43,920	
30 Oct-9 Nov; Grosvenor Casinos Blackpool	(England) GUKPT Blackpool LEG.8 £1,250; Main Event Guarantee Prizepool £250,000	279	£289,550	(England) Kostas Patsourakis	£67,990	
20-30 Nov; G Casinos The Poker Room	(England) GUKPT London GRAND FINAL £2,000	334	£569,640	(England) Alan Stearn	£125,645*	

* Denote in deal
(England) Thomas Clack - 2025 Player of the Year won: £40,000 Sponsorship Package + Grosvenor Casinos Player of the Year Trophy + £100,000 Champions Invitational.

=== Season 20 (2026 Tour) ===
Date/Local	Event/Buy-in	Entires	Prize Pool	Winner	Prize	Info
8-18 Jan; G Casinos The Poker Room	(England) GUKPT London The Vic LEG.1 £1,250; Main Event Guarantee Prizepool £250,000	368	£383,060	(England) Brandon Sheils	£88,760	
5-15 Feb; Grosvenor Casinos Coventry	(England) UK OPEN 2026 Coventry £1,500; Main Event Guarantee Prizepool £1,000,000	669	£953,592	(England) Mariusz Czech	£160,962*	
28 Feb-8 Mar; Grosvenor Casinos Bury	(England) GUKPT Manchester LEG.2 £1,250; Main Event Guarantee Prizepool £250,000	315	£327,920	(England) Endrit Geci	£76,710	
9-19 Apr; G Casinos The Poker Room	(England) GUKPT London The Vic LEG.3 £1,250; Main Event Guarantee Prizepool £250,000	432	£450,180	(France) Cedric Schwaederle	£102,880	
14-25 May; Grosvenor Casinos Luton	(England) GUKPT Luton LEG.4 £1,250; Main Event Guarantee Prizepool £250,000	190	£236,250	(Turkey) Yucel Eminoglu	£57,640	
23 Jul-2 Ago; Grosvenor Casinos Coventry	(England) GUKPT Coventry £1,250; Main Event Guarantee Prizepool £1,000,000	876	£1,000,000	(Scotland) Dean Hutchison	£163,280*	
23 Jul-2 Ago; Grosvenor Casinos Coventry	(England) GOLIATH Coventry £200 £2,000,000 estimated	14,663	£2,228,780	(England) Damon Burch-Hyson	£365,520	
13-23 Aug; Grosvenor Casinos Glasgow	(Scotland) GUKPT Glasgow LEG.5 £560; Main Event estimated Prizepool £100,000	348	£165,290	(Scotland) Bernie McGinlay	£38,240	
3-13 Sep; Grosvenor Casinos Luton	(England) GUKPT Luton LEG.6 £560; Main Event Guarantee Prizepool £150,000	396	£188,100	(England) Renee Xie	£35,435	
24 Sep-4 Oct; Grosvenor Casinos Leeds	(England) GUKPT Leeds LEG.7 £1,000; Main Event Guarantee Prizepool £200,000	250	£213,750	(England) Cush Berlyn	£43,490	
29 Oct-8 Nov; Grosvenor Casinos Blackpool	(England) GUKPT Blackpool LEG.8 £1,250; Event Guarantee Prizepool £250,000	190	£237,700	(Northern Ireland) Adam Wilkinson	£55,035	
19-29 Nov; G Casinos The Poker Room	(England) GUKPT London GRAND FINAL £2,000; Event Guarantee Prizepool £500,000					

* Denote in deal
TBD - 2026 Player of the Year

== Most Winners ==
Players who won multiple times the (Main Event) or (Midi Main Event) or (Online) or (Goliath) or (Main Event Grand Final) or (Grand Final)

Place	Country/Player	Years
1st	(England) Julian Thew	2007 - 2008 - 2011
	(England) Benjamin Winsor	2014 - 2015 - 2019
	(England) Richard Trigg	2013 - 2021 - 2022
4th	(Republic of Ireland) Tony Cascarino	2008 - 2009
	(England) Paul Foltyn	2008 - 2010
	(England) Priyan de Mel	2009 - 2010
	(England) Praz Bansi	2007 - 2011
	(England) Sunny Chattha	2009 - 2013
	(England) Andrew Teng	2008 - 2014
	(England) Driton Haxhiaj	2013 - 2016
	(England) Ali Mallu	2015 - 2017
	(England) Jack Hardcastle	2021 - 2022
	(England) Stuart Rutter	2010 - 2023
	(England) Paul Nunes	2014 - 2023
	(Scotland) Ludovic Geilich	2023 - 2024
	(England) Chris Johnson	2022 - 2024
	(England) Andrew Hulme	2018 - 2025
	(Italy) Calogero Morreale	2023 - 2025
	(United Kingdom) Ravi Sheth	2024 - 2025
	(England) Kostas Patsourakis	2023 - 2025
	(Turkey) Yucel Eminoglu	2024 - 2026

Ordered by the year the player won last title
Up to Season 20 - GUKPT Leeds LEG.7 (October 2026)

== Winners by country ==
Place	Country	Times
1st	England	161
2nd	Scotland	15
3rd	(Republic of Ireland) Ireland	5
4th	France	3
5th	Belgium	2
	Hong Kong	2
	Italy	2
	Northern Ireland	2
	Turkey	2
	Vietnam	2
	Wales	2
12th	Australia	1
	Canada	1
	China	1
	Cyprus	1
	Egypt	1
	Germany	1
	Malaysia	1
	New Zealand	1
	Poland	1
	(Romania) Romenia	1
	Russia	1
	Sweden	1
	United States	1
	anonymous / online	6
		217

Not included Summer Series and Club Championships
Up to Season 20 - GUKPT Blackpool LEG.8 (November 2026)
