= Listed buildings in New Brighton, Merseyside =

New Brighton is a seaside resort and part of the town of Wallasey, Wirral, Merseyside, England. It contains 23 buildings that are recorded in the National Heritage List for England as designated listed buildings. Of these, three are listed at Grade II*, the middle of the three grades, and the others are at Grade II, the lowest grade. In the early 19th century plans were made to develop the site of the resort as a fashionable watering place, and a number of large houses were built. This was only partly successful, and the area later developed into a resort used mainly by the working class. The listed buildings include some of the early large houses. Other buildings include two lighthouses, a former fort, a church, three shelters on the sea front, a war memorial, and a former bank.

== Key ==
Grade	Criteria
II*	Particularly important buildings of more than special interest
II	Buildings of national importance and special interest

== Buildings ==
Name and location	Photograph	Date	Notes	Grade
Leasowe Castle; 53.41851°N 3.10808°W		1593	Built for Ferdinando Stanley, 5th Earl of Derby. it was originally an octagonal tower. Turrets were added later, of which two remain. Later still an extra storey was added to the tower, and the house was enlarged in 1818 by John Foster. In the 20th century the building was converted into a hotel. It is built in stone with slate roofs, and the wings are timber-framed. The building has an L-shaped plan, is mainly in three storeys, and consists of a central octagonal three-storey tower with two turrets, and two wings. Most of the windows are sashes.	II*
Leasowe Lighthouse; 53.41317°N 3.12578°W		1763	The lighthouse was built by the Liverpool Docks Committee for navigation with another lighthouse, which has since been demolished. It is 101 feet (30.8 m) high, is built in cavity brickwork, and consists of a tapering seven-storey cylinder. There are tiers of windows and an entrance, all with segmental heads. The lighthouse was decommissioned in 1908, and has since been restored.	II
Fort Perch Rock; 53.44259°N 3.04085°W		1826–29	The fort was built to guard the entrance to the River Mersey, and later used as a museum. It is built in Runcorn sandstone with concrete additions in the Second World War to house radar. The fort has a trapezoidal plan, and is approached by a causeway on elliptical arches. It has four round towers, ten gun ports, and a gateway with paired Doric columns, an entablature, a parapet with scrolled ends, and a cast iron coat of arms.	II*
Perch Rock Lighthouse; 53.44427°N 3.04233°W		1827–30	The lighthouse was designed by John Foster. It is built in stone from Anglesey coated with Pozzolanic cement. The lighthouse is circular and has a light chamber at the top. Around the light chamber is an iron balcony, which is glazed on the side facing the sea, and in metal on the side facing the land. The light chamber has a conical roof surmounted by a weathervane.	II*
21 and 23 Montpellier Crescent; 53.43685°N 3.05357°W		c. 1835	A pair of stuccoed houses with a slate roof in Italianate style. They have three storeys with basements, and a four-bay front, the central two bays projecting under an open pediment and containing a projection with a round-headed entrances and windows; all the windows are sashes. The outer bays have terraces with pierced balustrades, and at the rear is a loggia and balustrade.	II
33 Rowson Street; 53.43393°N 3.04359°W		c. 1835	A stuccoed house with a slate roof in two storeys and five bays. The second and fourth bays project forwards, are gabled, and contain three-light bow windows with friezes and cornices on consoles, and panelled parapets. The windows are casements. The central doorway has panelled pilasters, architraves, and a fanlight.	II
24 Wellington Road; 53.43897°N 3.04781°W		c. 1835	A stuccoed house with a slate roof in two storeys and five bays, the fourth and fifth bays projecting forward by one bay. The porch has angle pilasters and an entablature, and the round-headed doorway has coffering and panelled pilasters. The windows have imitation sashes, and most have architraves.	II
26 Wellington Road; 53.43882°N 3.04859°W		c. 1835	A stuccoed house with a hipped slate roof in a single storey and three bays. On the front are incised pilasters, a frieze, a cornice, and a central pediment. The doorway has a fanlight and a cornice on consoles, and this is flanked by rectangular bay windows containing pairs of sashes.	II
Railings and gate piers, 26 Wellington Road; 53.43861°N 3.04847°W		c. 1835	The railings and gate piers are in cast iron on a stone base and are elaborately decorated. The gate dates from the 20th century.	II
28, 30 and 30A Wellington Road; 53.43875°N 3.04898°W		c. 1835	A pair of stuccoed houses with a slate roof, in two storeys with basements, and in eight bays. Four of the bays project forward and have gables with decorative bargeboards, three have coped gables, and the other has a gabled half-dormer. The porches are gabled and have Tudor arched doorways and hood moulds. At the rear are canted bay windows and an ornate iron balcony. The gate piers and railings are included in the listing.	II
36, 38 and 40 Wellington Road; 53.43848°N 3.05030°W		c. 1835	Three joined stuccoed houses with a slate roof. They have a central two-storey three-bay block flanked by single storey blocks with basements. There is a central porch with a round-headed entrance, paired pilasters, an entablature and a parapet. The outer blocks have gables with ornamental bargeboards and pendants, canted bay windows and gabled porches. The gate piers and railings are included in the listing.	II
42 and 42A Wellington Road; 53.43846°N 3.05063°W		c. 1835	A stuccoed house with a slate roof in a single storey and five bays, the central three bays projecting forward. The entablature has a Vitruvian scroll frieze. The central porch has pairs of Ionic pilasters, and a round-headed entrance, flanked by canted bay windows. In the left bay is a window with an architrave, and in the right bay is a 19th-century conservatory. The gate piers, with Ionic pilasters, and the ornate railings, are included in the listing.	II
44 and 44A Wellington Road; 53.43844°N 3.05090°W		c. 1835	A stuccoed house with a tiled roof in five bays. The central three bays are symmetrical in a single storey, flanked by bays with embattled parapets; the left bay has a single storey, and the right bay has two. The central porch has Ionic pilasters, and a round-headed entrance, and this is flanked by canted bay windows. The left bay has a 20th-century entrance, and the right bay contains a square bay window. The ornate gate piers are included in the listing.	II
46 Wellington Road; 53.43843°N 3.05121°W		c. 1835	The house is partly stuccoed and partly pebbledashed, and has a hipped slate roof. It is in a single storey, and has a three-bay front. On the front are four pilasters with pointed recesses, and a central gable with ornamental bargeboards. The central doorway and the sash windows have hood moulds. At the rear are two canted bay windows and an ornate balcony.	II
16 and 18 St George's Mount; 53.43542°N 3.04495°W		c. 1840	A pair of stuccoed houses with a slate roof. They have two storeys with attics and basements, and a seven-bay front, the outer bays projecting under pediments. The porches are in the angles and contain round-headed entrances with architraves and pierced parapets. The windows also have architraves, and contain casements. At the rear are canted bay windows, an ornate verandah, and a balustraded balcony.	II
Redcliffe; 53.43861°N 3.04963°W		c. 1840	A stone house with a slate roof by Harvey Lonsdale Elmes. It has two storeys and a basement, and a front of four bays with a recessed service wing. The first and third bays project forward with gables and pinnacles. The entrance is in the third bay and has a Tudor arched doorway with foliate spandrels, and a hood mould. Some of the windows are mullioned and transomed, and others are 20th-century casements. At the rear is a central canted bay window, a loggia, and a traceried balustrade.	II
St James' Church; 53.43720°N 3.04566°W		1854–56	The church is by George Gilbert Scott, and a vestry was added in 1924. It is built in stone with a slate roof, and has a cruciform plan. The church consists of a nave with a clerestory, aisles, transepts, a chancel with a south chapel and vestry, and a northeast steeple. The steeple has a four-stage tower, and a broach spire with lucarnes and a niche above each broach.	II
Shelter (east); 53.44065°N 3.03989°W		Late 19th century (probable)	The shelter is in cast iron, and has a rectangular plan with canted ends. There is a hipped roof carried on round columns with ornate capitals and openwork spandrels. The roof has an entablature with pendants, and anthemion acroteria on the corners. The internal partitions contain benches.	II
Shelter (central); 53.44072°N 3.04160°W		Late 19th century (probable)	The shelter is in cast iron, and has a rectangular plan with canted ends. There is a hipped roof carried on round columns with ornate capitals and openwork spandrels. The roof has an entablature with pendants, and anthemion acroteria on the corners. The internal partitions contain benches.	II
Shelter (west); 53.44054°N 3.04328°W		Late 19th century (probable)	The shelter is in cast iron, and has a rectangular plan with canted ends. There is a hipped roof carried on round columns with ornate capitals and openwork spandrels. The roof has an entablature with pendants, and anthemion acroteria on the corners. The internal partitions contain benches.	II
War memorial 53.43223°N 3.03347°W		1921	The war memorial was designed and sculpted by William Birnie Rhind and unveiled by the Earl of Derby. It is in Portland stone, and consists of a large square pedestal with a cornice on a stepped circular plinth. On the pedestal are three figures of soldiers, on kneeling, one seated, and one standing. On the pedestal are the coat of arms of Wallasey and inscriptions.	II
Former Bank of Liverpool and residence 53.43799°N 3.04400°W		Early 20th century	Formerly a bank, later used for other purposes, the building occupies a corner site, and has two storeys with attics. The lower storey is in sandstone, the upper parts and rear are roughcast, and the roof is tiled. The corner bay is curved, on each side are two gabled bays, and to the north is a lower two-bay extension. The entrance is in the corner bay; this has granite Tuscan columns, a moulded architrave, a frieze, and a cornice. Above this is a curved window, over which is a frieze with relief figures, and a conical roof with a finial and a weathervane. The side bays have round-headed windows in the ground floor, and above are casement windows.	II
St Peter and St Paul's Church; 53.43509°N 3.04687°W		1933–35	A Roman Catholic church by E. Bower Norris in a prominent position in the resort. It has a reinforced concrete shell, faced in brick and with limestone dressings, and is in Classical Renaissance style. The church has a basilican plan with a dome over the crossing, a nave, aisles, porches, transepts, and a sanctuary. The dome has a tall brick drum with pilasters, a moulded circular cornice, a parapet containing oculi, and a copper-covered dome with a cross finial. Flanking the entrance are turrets with domed cupolas.	II
