= Vale Park, New Brighton =

Public park in Merseyside, England

Vale Park
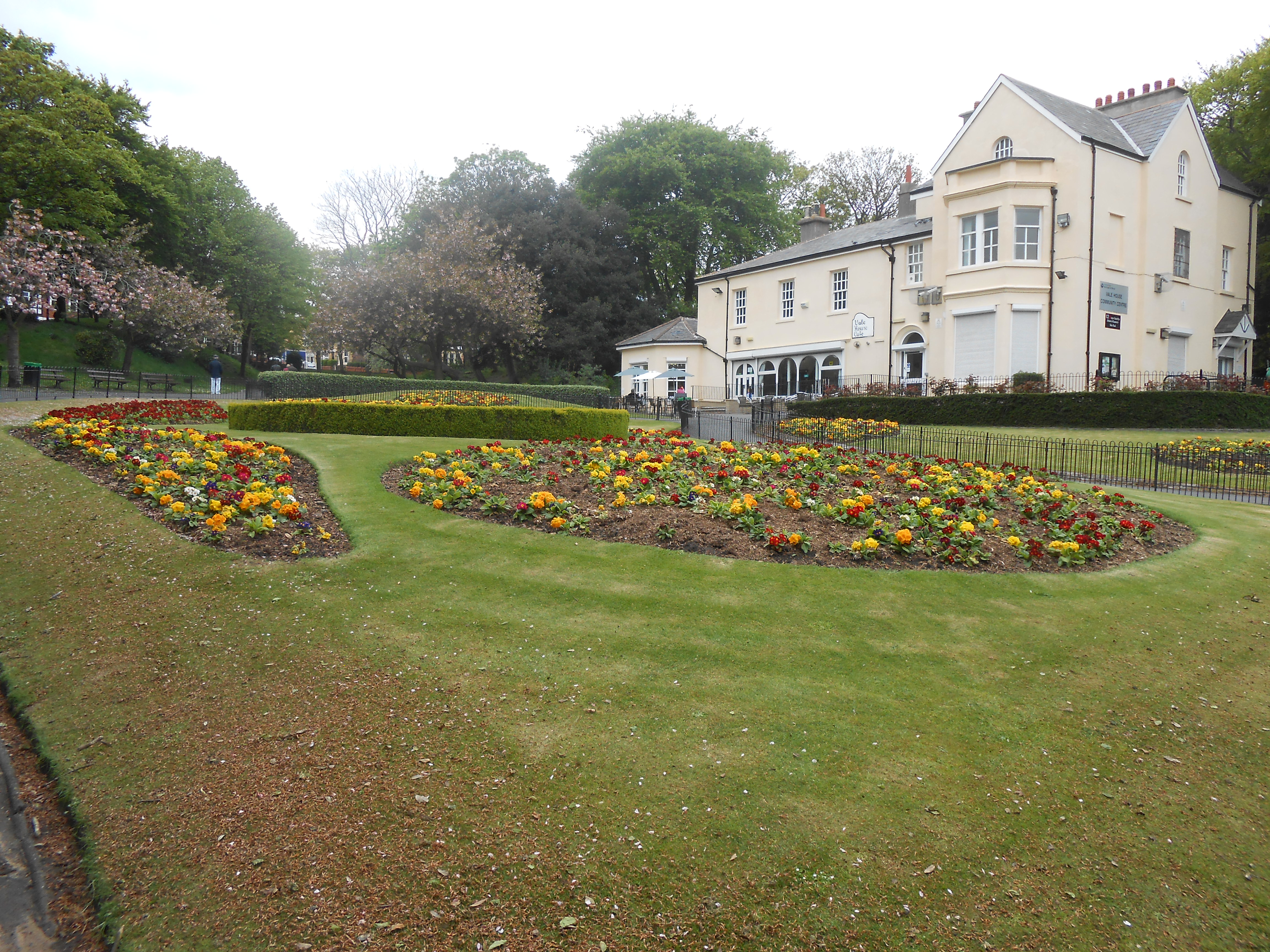
- Vale Park and Vale House
- Interactive map of Vale Park
- Type: Park
- Location: New Brighton, Merseyside, England
- Coordinates: 53°26′00″N 03°02′08″W
- Created: 1899
- Operator: Wirral County Council
- Status: Open all year
- Website: Vale Park

Vale Park is a historic Victorian park in New Brighton, Merseyside, England. It features formal gardens, a rose garden, and a bandstand. The park opened in 1899 and has hosted weekly brass band concerts through the summer months since the day the park opened.

== Location ==
The park is on New Brighton Promenade with views of the River Mersey and Liverpool. It is a short walk from The Black Pearl driftwood pirate ship.

== History ==
The park opened on 20 May 1899 with the bandstand being added in 1926.

Vale House, built circa 1830, was originally a family home. The family of Charles Holland, a Liverpool businessman and Wirral justice of the peace, lived here for over 50 years. Holland traveled widely and returned with botanical specimens that his gardeners planted, many of these plants and trees grace the park. The first Head Gardener of Vale Park was William Grinsell Burston, an expert botanist. Most of the design of the flowerbeds and footpaths were his. He died at Vale House in 1918. Vale House is now a community cafe and community centre.

== Features ==
The park has formal gardens, a children's play area, a cafe, toilets, a rose garden, annual bedding displays, open grass areas, a kick about pitch, a fairy garden, and outdoor fitness equipment.

== Brass band concerts ==
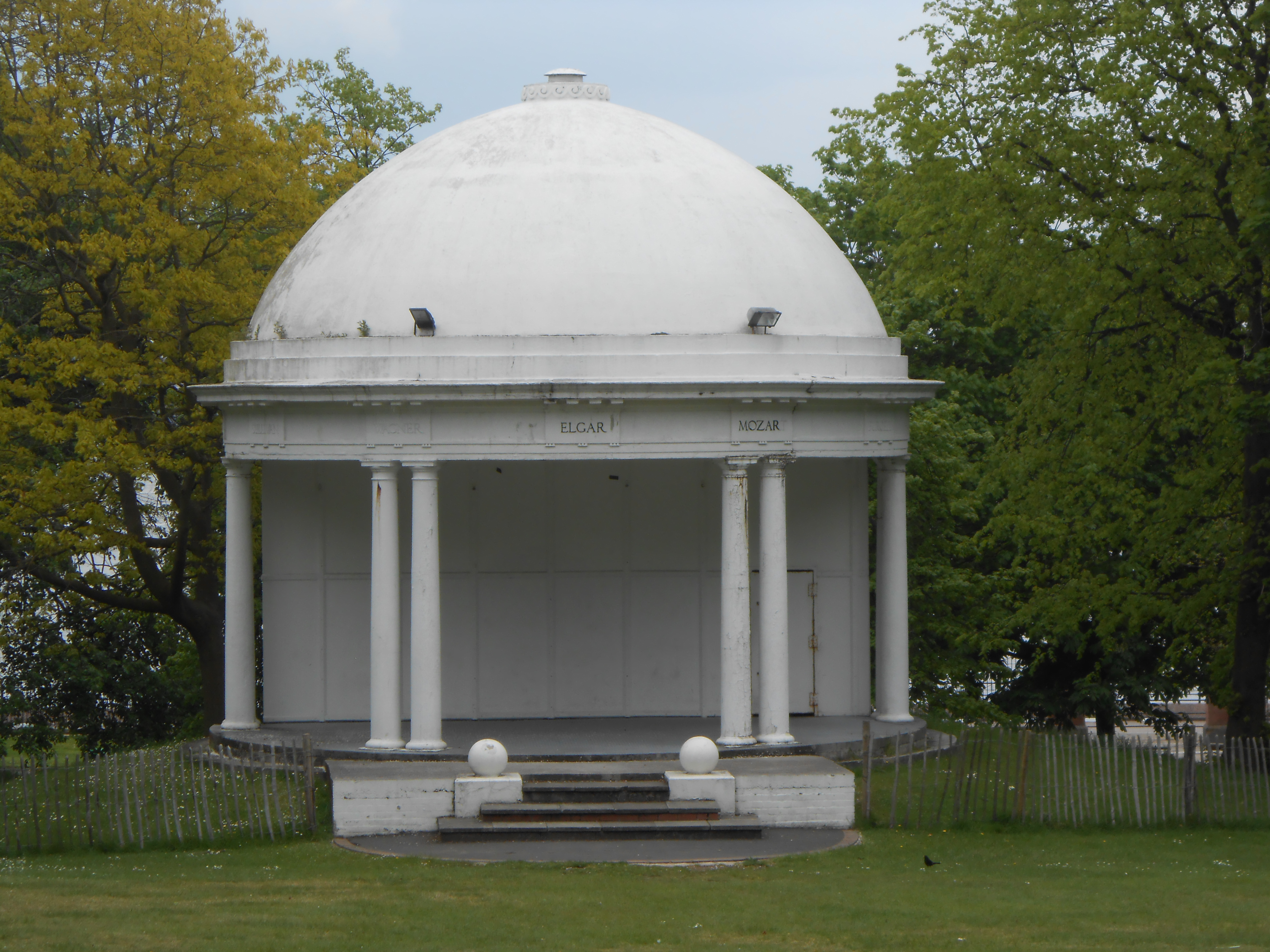
The Bandstand at Vale Park

The park features brass band concerts under the bandstand each Sunday through the summer months. Entry is free, with deck chairs provided for seating. Brass bands have been present since the day the park opened, when the Tranmere Prize Gleam Silver Band played the crowd in through the gates with the British National Anthem.
