= Marine Point =

- Location: New Brighton, Merseyside, England
- Coordinates: 53.440657°N 3.045621°W
- Address: Kings Parade, New Brighton
- Opened: October 2011
- Developer: Neptune Investments
- Floors: 2
- Website: www.marinepoint.co.uk

Marine Point is a shopping and leisure complex in New Brighton, Merseyside, England. The development was built at an estimated cost of £65 million. In 2022 Marine point was sold to David Samuel Properties for £44 million.

As of February 2018, the development consisted of:

- Unit 1 – Caffe Cream
- Unit 2 – Bella Italia
- Unit 3 – Prezzo
- Unit 4 – Burger King
- Unit 5 – Marino Lounge
- Unit 6 – Leisure unit available – 3,200sq ft
- Hotel – Travelodge – 66 rooms
- Unit 7 – United Kitchen (closed Autumn 2017)
- Unit 8 – PizzaExpress
- Unit 9 – Hungry Horse - The Sea Horse
- Unit 10 – Cinema – The Light – 8 Screen Digital Cinema
- Unit 12 – Starbucks
- Unit 13 – Greggs opened 2024
- Unit 14 – Subway (closed Winter 2024)
- Morrisons Superstore
- Unit 18 – Grosvenor Casino (closed Summer 2015)
- Unit 17 – Costa Coffee
- Unit 16 – Iceland
- Unit 15 – Home Bargains
- Lido – Bubbles' World Of Play - Opened January 2013
- Parking - Free 750 space car park
