= St Peter and St Paul's Church, New Brighton =

Church in Wirral, England

Coordinates: 53.4351°N 3.0469°W

- Ss. Peter and Paul and St. Philomena Catholic Church
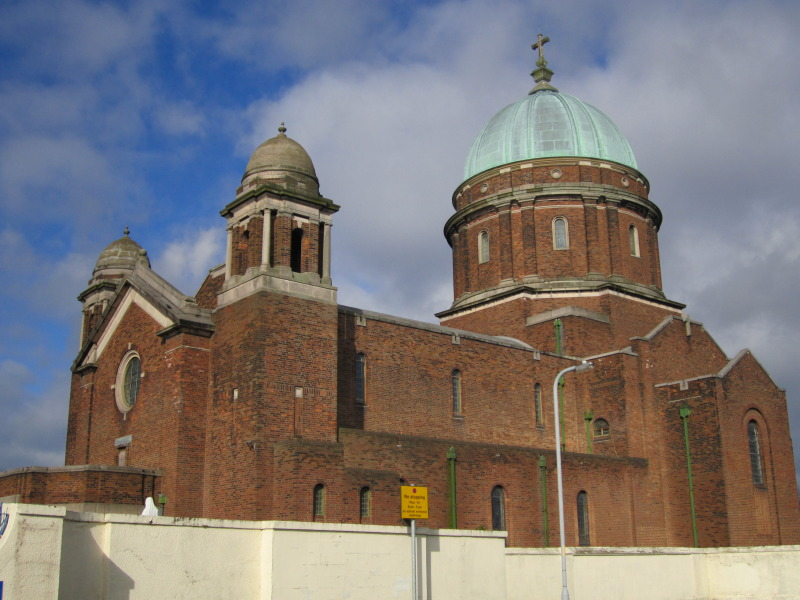
- The church as seen from Atherton Street.
- St Peter and St Paul's Church, New Brighton
- OS grid reference: SJ 30546 93654
- Location: Wirral
- Country: England
- Denomination: Roman Catholic
- Website: Shrine Webpage

Architecture
- Functional status: Parish church
- Heritage designation: Grade II listed
- Designated: 22 December 2003
- Architect: Ernest Bower Norris
- Completed: 1935

Administration
- Diocese: Shrewsbury

The Sacred Shrine of Ss. Peter, Paul and St. Philomena is a Grade II listed Church in Atherton Street, New Brighton, Wirral, England. It has a green dome, from which it has gained the name "The Dome of Home" from local people. The origins of this nickname date back to the mid 20th century, when sailors would recognise they were close to Merseyside when they could see the church.

== Origins of the church ==
The church was founded by a priest called Father Tom Mullins. Born in Ireland, he studied for Priesthood in Lisbon, Portugal. When Father Tom got back to the Wirral, he was serving at a church (now demolished) in Hope Street. He went on to pursue his dream of constructing the church. When construction was finished New Brighton was becoming a very popular resort. The church opened in 1935.

== Serving priests ==
1. Fr Tom Mullins 1935–1945
2. Mgr Canon Maurice Curran V.G 1945–1960
3. Father John Quinn (1960–1983)
4. Father Joseph Prendiville 1983
5. Father (later canon) Robert Fallon 1983–1990
6. Father Anthony Myers 1990–1996
7. Father Michael Wentworth 1996–2006
8. Father John Feeney 2006–2008 (church closed)
9. Canon Oliver Meney 2011–2012
10. Canon Amaury Montjean 2012 -

In addition, a retired Canon, William Briscoe O.B.E was in residence from 1986 to 2001.

== The present ==
In 2006, when Father Wentworth retired, Father Feeney was welcomed as the new Parish Priest. Father Feeney had a job of looking after three parishes, the others being English Martyrs and Our Lady of Lourdes. Together, all three churches united in becoming the North Wallasey Catholic Community.

In 2008, the church was closed by a decision of the local diocese. The parishioners were relocated to another church, about a five-minute walk away, called All Saints, owned by the Church of England

In 2011 the church was re-opened for a weekly mass, and there was an expression of interest by a religious order, the Institute of Christ the King, to re-open the church fully.

On 15 October 2011 Canon Oliver Meney and another member of the Institute of Christ the King took up residence in the fully renovated presbytery. Daily Mass is now offered in the day chapel at 9 a.m. with other devotions and activities. The church is fully open with Sung High Mass celebrated every Sunday at 10.30 a.m.

== See also ==
- Listed buildings in New Brighton, Merseyside
