= New Brighton, Merseyside =

Coastal resort in northern England

Coordinates: 53.432°N 3.049°W

New Brighton
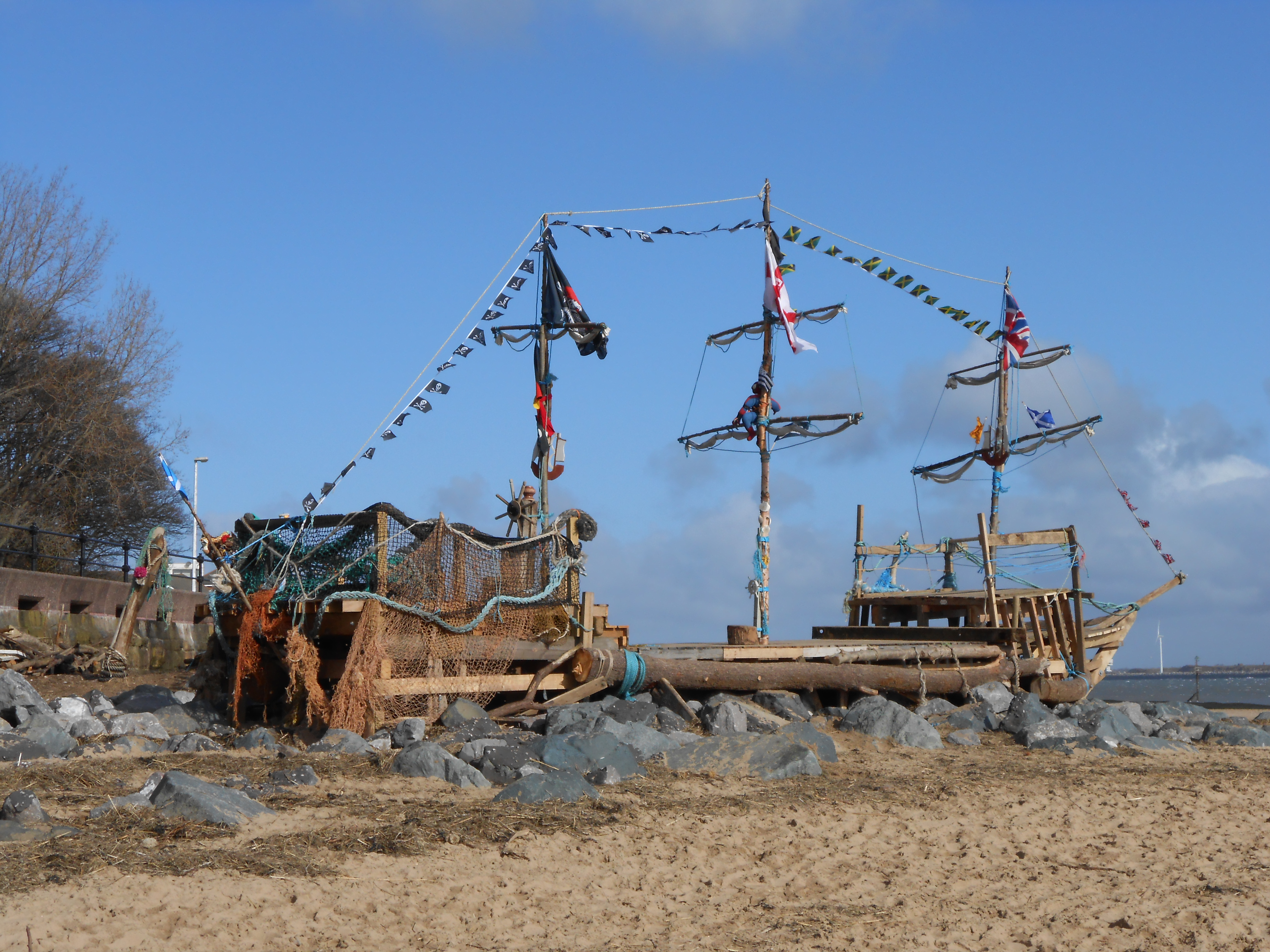
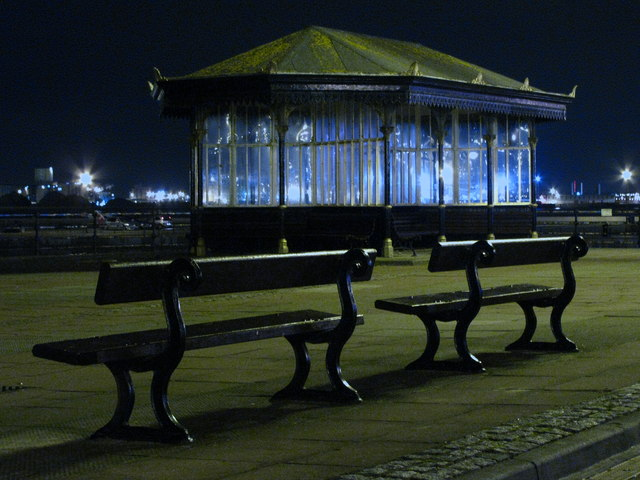
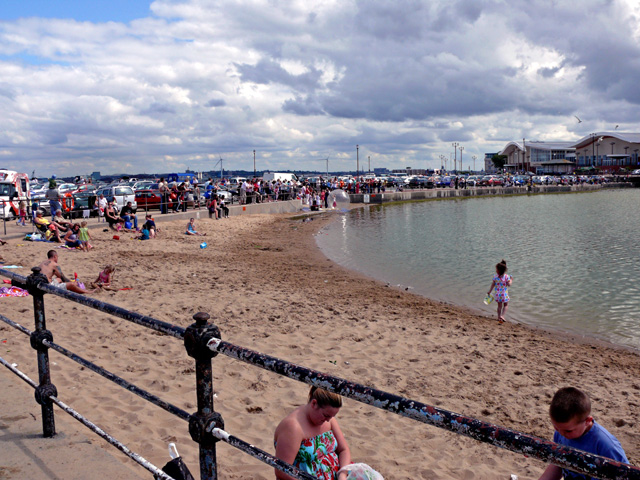
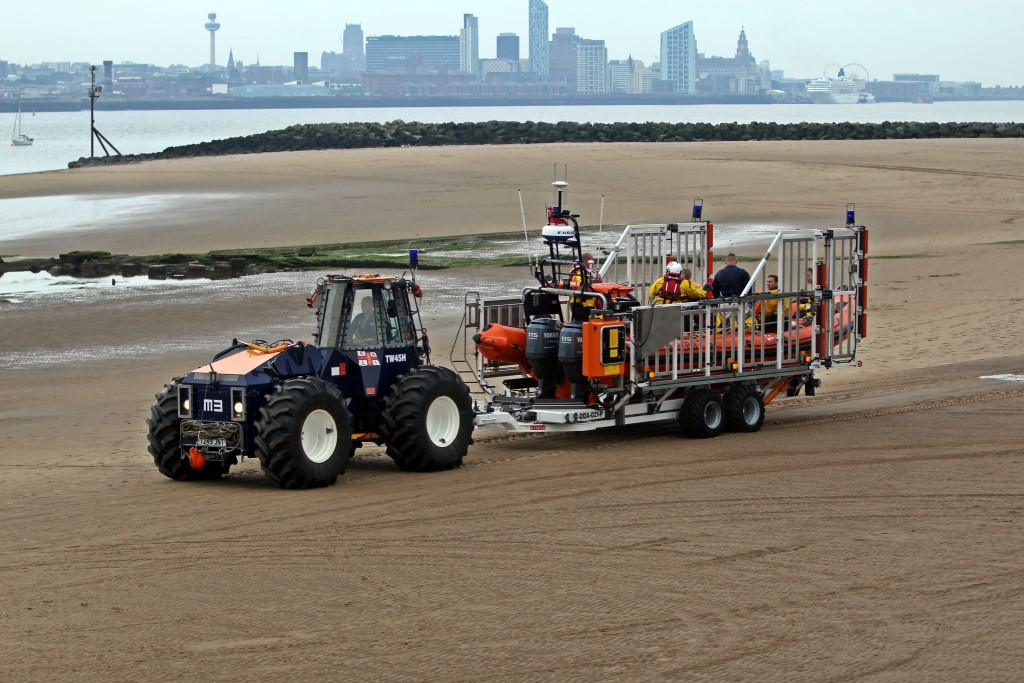
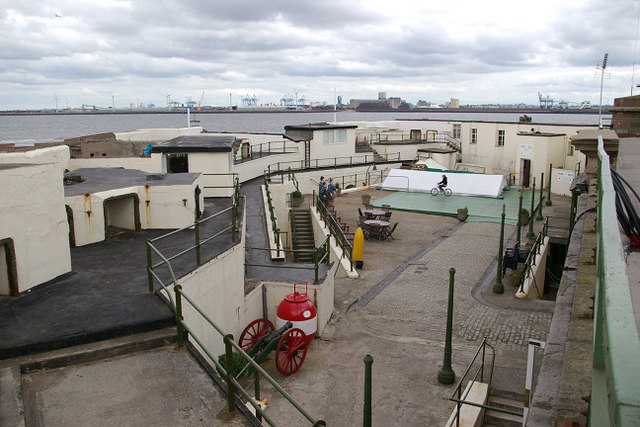
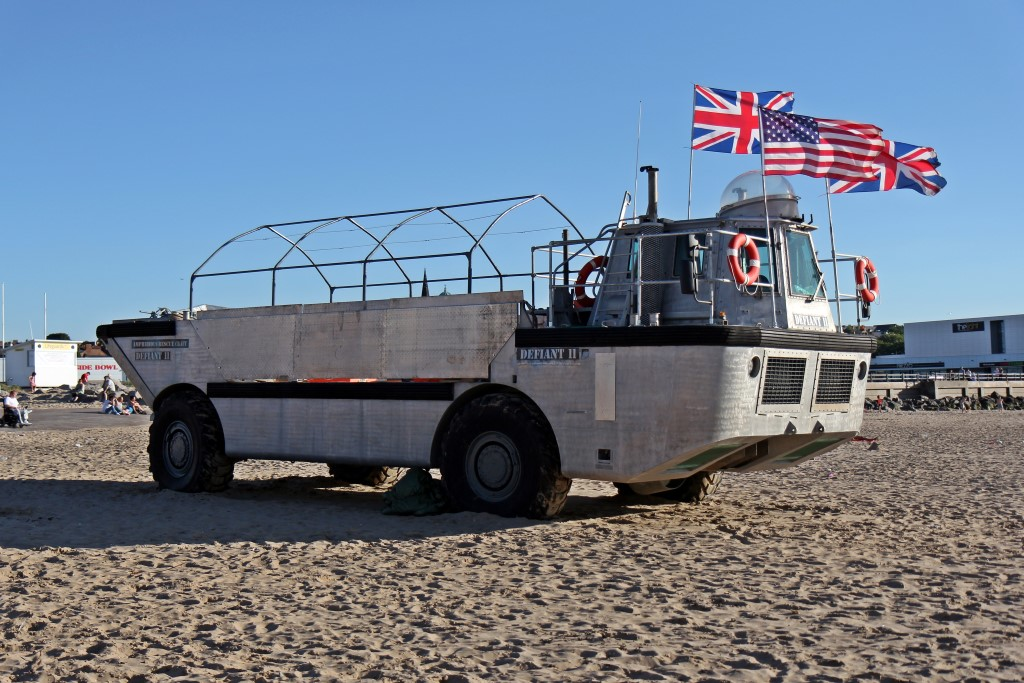
- Top to bottom, left to right: The Black Pearl pirate ship; one of the promenade shelters; the Marine Lake, with the Floral Pavilion in the background right; the RNLI tractor and lifeboat, with the Mersey estuary and the Liverpool skyline; Fort Perch Rock courtyard; a LARC-XV amphibious rescue truck, on the beach.

- Location within Merseyside
- Population: 15,149 (as of mid 2017) (2011 Census Ward)
- OS grid reference: SJ302934
  - London: 181 mi (291 km) SE
- Metropolitan borough: Wirral
- Metropolitan county: Merseyside
- Region: North West
- Country: England
- Sovereign state: United Kingdom
- Post town: WALLASEY
- Postcode district: CH45
- Dialling code: 0151
- ISO 3166 code: GB-WRL
- Police: Merseyside
- Fire: Merseyside
- Ambulance: North West
- UK Parliament: Wallasey

New Brighton is a seaside resort and suburb of Wallasey, in the Metropolitan Borough of Wirral in Merseyside, England, at the northeastern tip of the Wirral peninsula. It has sandy beaches which line the Irish Sea and mouth of the Mersey, and the UK's longest promenade.

At the 2011 Census, the population was 14,859.

== History ==
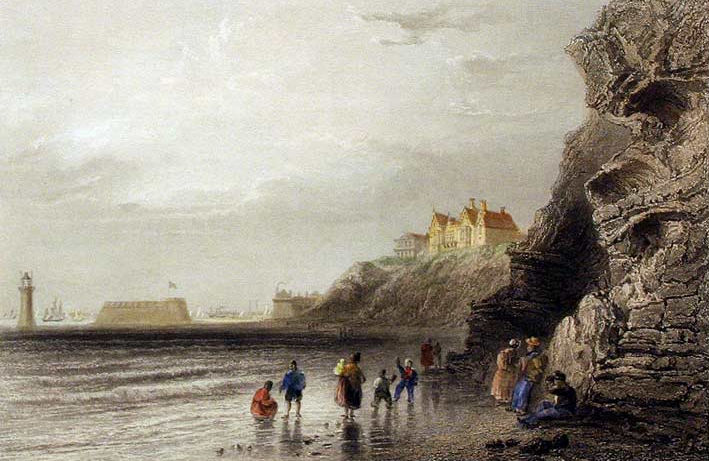
New Brighton sea front, with lighthouse and Fort Perch Rock, c. 1840

Up to the nineteenth century, the area had a reputation for smuggling and wrecking, and secret underground cellars and tunnels are still rumoured to exist. It also had a strategic position at the entrance to the Mersey Estuary.

The Perch Rock battery was completed in 1829. It housed 18 guns, mostly 32-pounders. Three 6-inch guns were installed in 1899. Originally cut off at high tide, coastal reclamation has since made it fully accessible.

In 1830, a Liverpool merchant, James Atherton, purchased 170 acres (69 ha) of land at Rock Point, which enjoyed views out to sea and across the Mersey and had a good beach. His aim was to develop it as a desirable residential area and watering place for the gentry, similar to Brighton, one of the most elegant seaside resorts of that Regency period – hence the name "New Brighton". Substantial development began soon afterwards, and housing began to spread up the hillside overlooking the estuary – a former gunpowder magazine was closed down in 1851.

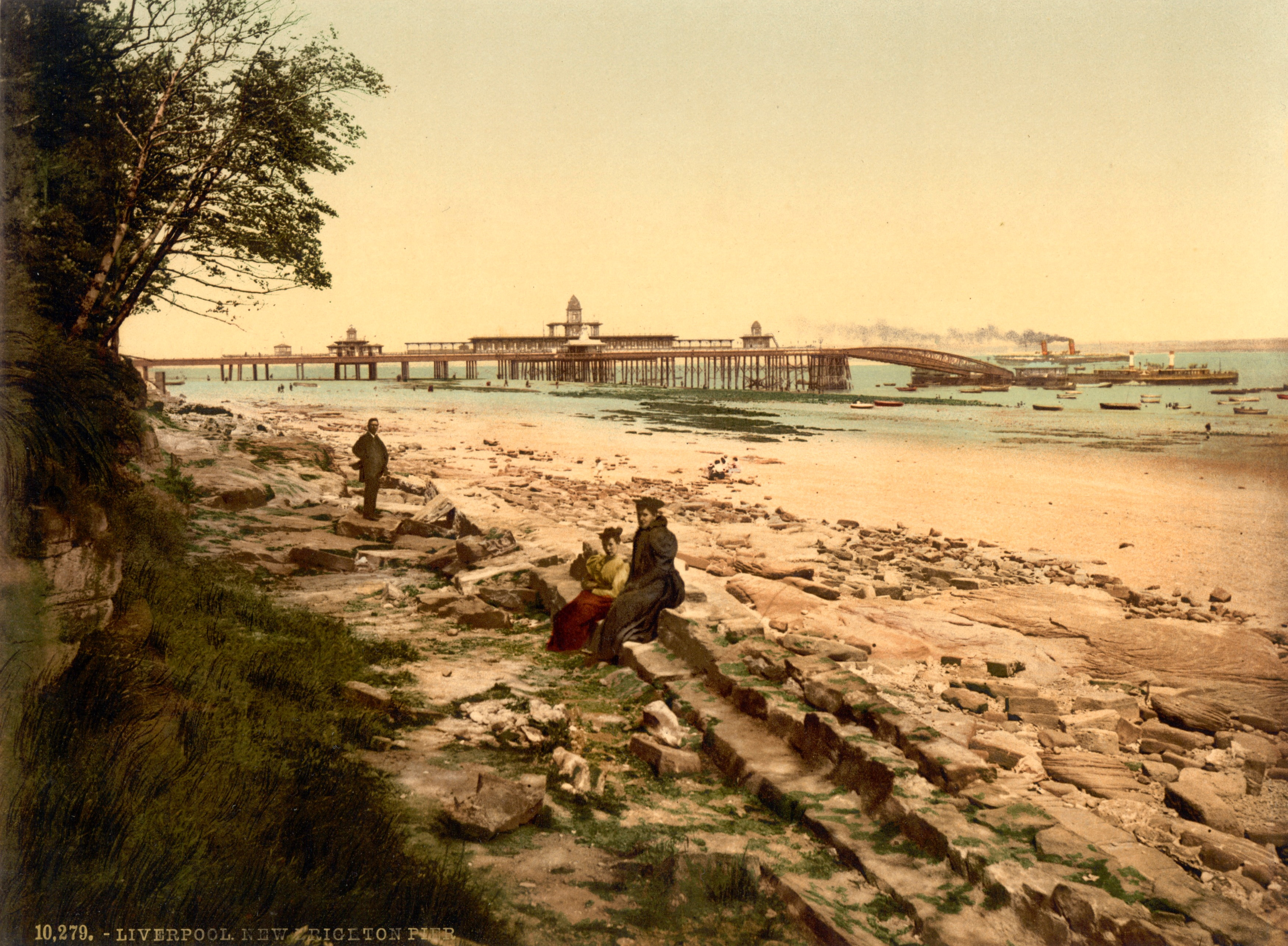
New Brighton Pier and landing stage, during the 1890s

During the latter half of the nineteenth century, New Brighton developed as a very popular seaside resort serving Liverpool and the Lancashire industrial towns, and many of the large houses were converted to inexpensive hotels. Designed by the noted architect of seaside structures Eugenius Birch, the New Brighton Pier opened in 1867 and the promenade from Seacombe to New Brighton was completed by 1901. This served both as a recreational amenity in its own right, and to link up the developments along the estuary, and was later extended westwards towards Leasowe, making it the longest in the UK.

The River Mersey and the resort were described by the diarist Francis Kilvert in 1872 as: "crowded with vessels of all sorts moving up and down the river, ships, barques, brigs, brigantines, schooners, cutters, colliers, tugs, steamboats, lighters, "flats", everything from the huge emigrant liner steamship with four masts to the tiny sailing and rowing boat ... At New Brighton there are beautiful sands stretching for miles along the coast and the woods wave green down to the salt water's edge. The sands were covered with middle class Liverpool folks and children out for a holiday."

From the 1880s until the First World War, New Brighton was one of the regular destinations for the Bass Excursions, when fifteen trains would take 8,000–9,000 employees of Bass's Burton brewery on an annual trip to the seaside.

=== Twentieth century ===
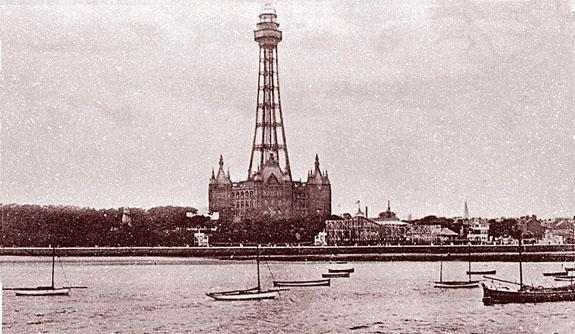
New Brighton Tower & Ballroom, viewed from the River Mersey, c. 1910

The New Brighton Tower, the tallest in the country, was opened in 1900 but closed in 1919, largely due to lack of maintenance during World War I, and had been dismantled by 1921. In 1908 a new Winter Gardens Theatre was opened, initially just for stage plays, but later also screening films.

New Brighton's former open-air swimming pool, of Art Deco architecture, was opened on 13 June 1934 by Viscount Leverhulme. When it was built, it was the largest lido in Britain, at a cost of £90,000. The saltwater pool survived until 1990, when it was damaged during a storm and later demolished.

Built in 1935, St Peter and St Paul's Church in Atherton Street is still a landmark. In the Second World War, sailors used to recognise they were close to home when they could see the green dome of the church from the Mersey.

After the Second World War, the popularity of New Brighton as a seaside resort declined dramatically. However, the Tower Ballroom continued as a major venue, hosting numerous concerts in the 1950s and 1960s by local Liverpool groups such as the Beatles, and international stars. The Tower Ballroom continued in use until it was destroyed by a fire in 1969.

Ferries across the Mersey to New Brighton ceased in 1971, after which the ferry pier and landing stage were dismantled. By 1977, the promenade pier had suffered the same fate.

In 1986, the area became the subject of Martin Parr's famous photographic book The Last Resort, which became controversial.

== Geography ==
New Brighton is at the northeastern corner, and most northerly point, of the Wirral Peninsula, at the western side of the mouth of the River Mersey. The Irish Sea is to the north. New Brighton lies on quite a steep hillside; the marine lake and lighthouse are at sea level while, less than 600 m (660 yd) away, St Peter and St Paul's Church sits on a promontory at 48 m (157 ft) above sea level.

The 6.4 km (4 mi)-long North Wirral Coastal Park is between New Brighton and Meols.

== Landmarks ==
=== Perch Rock ===
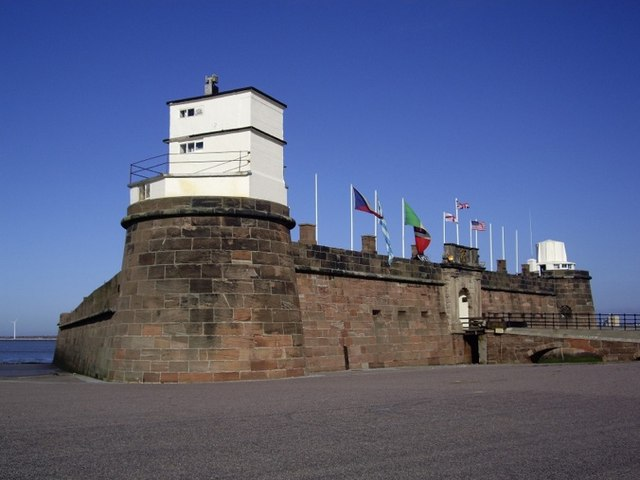
Fort Perch Rock

Fort Perch Rock is a coastal defence battery built between 1825 and 1829, with the foundation stone being laid in 1826. It was built to protect the Port of Liverpool and proposed as a fortified lighthouse to replace the old Perch Rock Light, however a separate lighthouse was built. The fort was built on an area known as Black Rock, and was cut off at high tide. However, coastal reclamation has made it fully accessible. It is currently closed.

=== Lighthouse ===
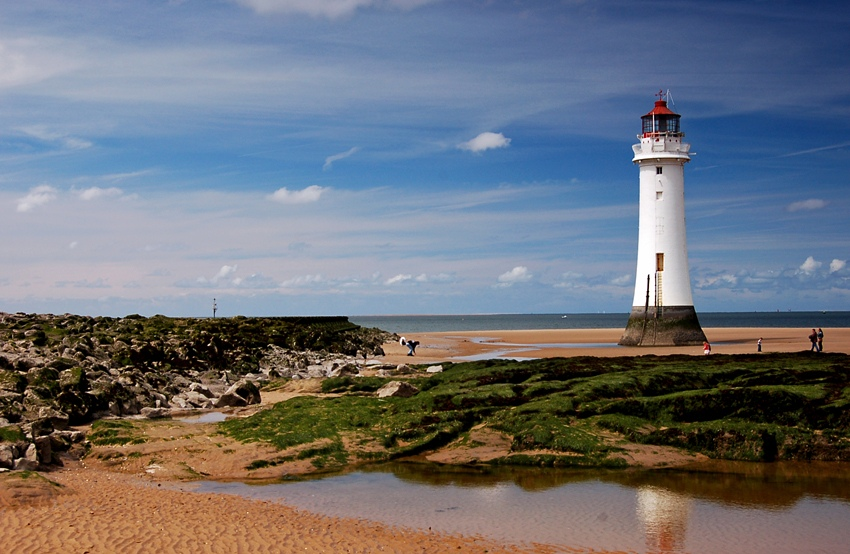
New Brighton Lighthouse

New Brighton Lighthouse was originally known as Perch Rock Lighthouse. Construction of the present structure began in 1827 though a light had been maintained on the rock since 1683. It was designed by John Foster Jr., on the lines of Eddystone, and built by Tomkinson & Company using marble rock from Anglesey.

=== Churches ===
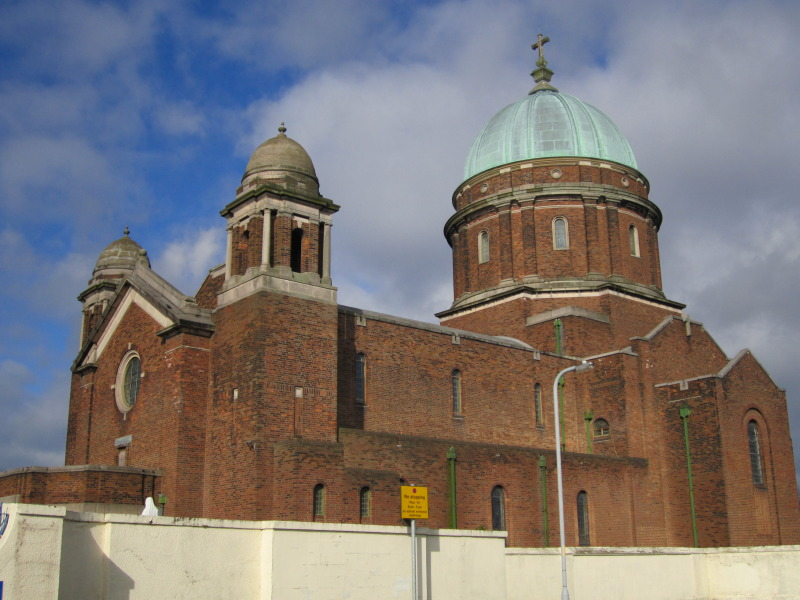
St Peter and Paul's Church

New Brighton has two recognisable churches dominating the skyline and visible from the River Mersey. On Victoria Road, the Anglican St James Church by Sir George Gilbert Scott notable for its thin broach spire and a polygonal apse. It now incorporates the New Brighton Visitors Centre. St Peter and Paul's Roman Catholic Church at the top of Atherton Street, completed in 1935, is a prominent Grade II listed building in the Roman Gesu style, featuring a large dome on a drum. Nicknamed the "Dome of Home" by returning sailors, the church closed in 2008, before reopening in 2011.

=== Black Pearl ===
The Black Pearl Pirate Ship was a community art installation situated on the beach near Tower Grounds. A replica of a three-masted pirate man-of-war, it is almost entirely constructed from salvaged materials and driftwood found on the beach. Unusually for an artwork it was the focus for many other activities, mainly as a children's play structure, but also as a mock-up vessel for RNLI exercises, wedding ceremonies and as a popular subject for photography.

Originally constructed in 2013 by local artists Major Mace and Frank Lund, it was damaged by both arson and storms and was continuously maintained and reconstructed by its creators and local volunteers until it was destroyed again, until, in March 2023 it was announced it would not be rebuilt. The 'ship' had become a semi-permanent landmark on the seafront attracting thousands of visitors a year and national media attention.

== Recreation ==
There are brass band concerts every week during the summer months in Vale Park.

== Governance ==
New Brighton is part of the Wallasey parliamentary constituency and represented by Angela Eagle MP, of the Labour Party who retained her seat in the 2024 general election.

New Brighton is an electoral ward of the Metropolitan Borough of Wirral, which is itself a district of the metropolitan county of Merseyside.

== Economy ==
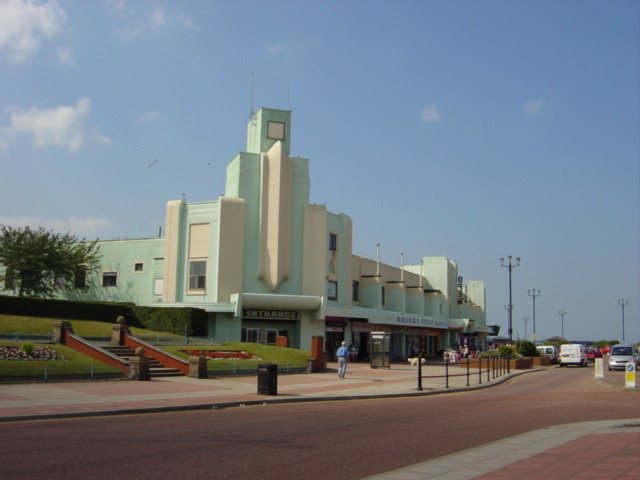
New Palace amusement arcade, an Art Deco building.

Typical of a seaside resort, New Brighton has a wide range of visitor attractions and facilities adjoining the beach. These focus on the £60m Marine Point Leisure and Retail development, which opened in 2011. This includes a 66-bedroom Travelodge hotel, a range of cafe bars and restaurants, a Morrisons supermarket and The Light, an 8-screen digital multiplex cinema. Other attractions include the Riverside Bowl bowling alley, the LaserQuest centre, the Art Deco New Palace amusement arcade (which includes a small fairground) and the Floral Pavilion Theatre, which was rebuilt in 2008 as a first phase of the town's regeneration, and accommodates a conference centre.

Significant investment was made in the public realm, with particular highlights being the model boating lake and promenade. Several chain restaurants opened.

The Wirral Show, a free-to-enter annual event, was held on open ground off the King's Parade at New Brighton for 33 years until 2009. A sailing school, which used the refurbished marine lake, closed in 2015.

== Music ==
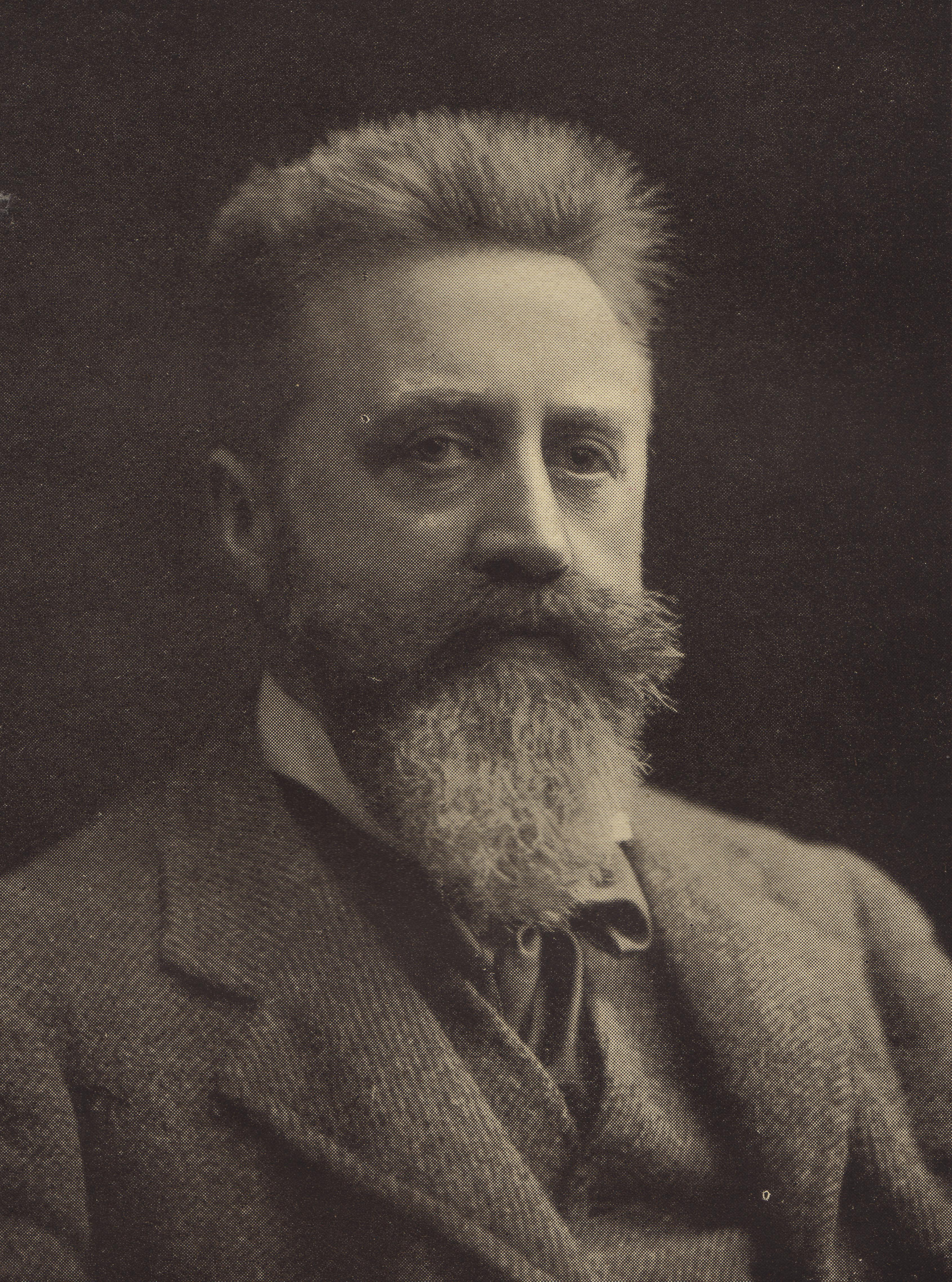
Granville Bantock, conductor at the New Brighton Tower Ballroom

Musically, New Brighton first came to national prominence when Granville Bantock, later to be knighted as one of Britain's most prolific composers, took over leadership of the New Brighton Tower concert band. Instead of continuing with the usual populist programme of dances and marches, Bantock set about transforming it into a professional orchestra. Unusually for the time, the orchestra performed modern classical music and would champion contemporary composers, even daringly devoting entire programmes to an individual composer's music. In return, many leading lights of contemporary British music, including Stanford, Parry, Corder, Mackenzie and Elgar, came to New Brighton to conduct and perform, and the New Brighton orchestra became nationally respected for the remaining period of Bantock's tenure.

The Beatles performed at the Tower Ballroom, at the site of the old New Brighton Tower, 27 times. Aside from the famous Cavern Club in their native Liverpool, The Beatles played there more frequently than any other location in the United Kingdom.

The pop concert New Brighton Rock was held over two days: 21 and 22 May 1984 at the town's open-air swimming pool and transmitted by Granada Television on 23 June 1984 on ITV. It featured many musical artists of the day including Frankie Goes to Hollywood, Gloria Gaynor, Madness, Nik Kershaw and Spandau Ballet. A strain was placed on local police resources due to an ongoing commitment to the 1984–85 miners' strike. Nevertheless, the event was covered by Merseyside Police's Wirral Division.

A song about New Brighton called "New Brighton" was included on the 1992 album Song by Liverpool-based group It's Immaterial. In 1996, Wallasey Brit-pop band the Boo Radleys released the C'mon Kids album. Track 9 on the album was an atmospheric and nostalgic song called "New Brighton Promenade". New Brighton is briefly mentioned in the song "Radio America" by the Libertines and there is also the song "A Day Out in New Brighton" on the "Delivery" CD single by Babyshambles. Also the band Jegsy Dodd and the sons of Harry Cross had a track on their 1986 Winebars & Werewolves album called "Who Killed New Brighton".

The bandstand situated in Vale Park is a popular outdoor music venue, hosting a variety of acts, typically an orchestra or choir every Sunday. In more recent times, the bandstand has hosted music to a younger generation and is popular throughout the summer.

== Sport ==
=== Football ===
New Brighton Tower F.C. were an association football League club based in New Brighton which was disbanded in 1901. Like Liverpool, Chelsea and Thames, New Brighton Tower were formed to play at an already-built stadium, the Tower Athletic Ground, with a capacity of 80,000. The owners of the New Brighton Tower, a seaside attraction built to rival the Blackpool Tower, recognised a need to ensure winter profits, and had built a stadium adjacent to the tower. The football club was formed in 1896 to provide the entertainment, and joined the Lancashire League at the start of the 1897–98 season. After finishing as champions in their first season, the club were elected to the Second Division of the Football League when the League was expanded by four clubs. The team were very poorly supported, often averaging gates of 1,000.

The club signed a number of new players, including some who had played international football, and was reasonably successful, finishing 5th (out of 18) in its first season, and 4th in their third season. However, the cost of maintaining a professional football club became too high for the Tower's owners, and the club was disbanded in the summer of 1901, and replaced in the League by Doncaster Rovers.

In 1921, a new club was formed, New Brighton A.F.C., who would also play in the Football League from 1923 until 1951.

=== Rugby ===
New Brighton Football Club (R.U.) are a rugby union team now based in Moreton. They currently play in South Lancs/Cheshire 1 in the English rugby union system. The club was formed in New Brighton in 1875 and has been based at several grounds over the years.

== Transport ==
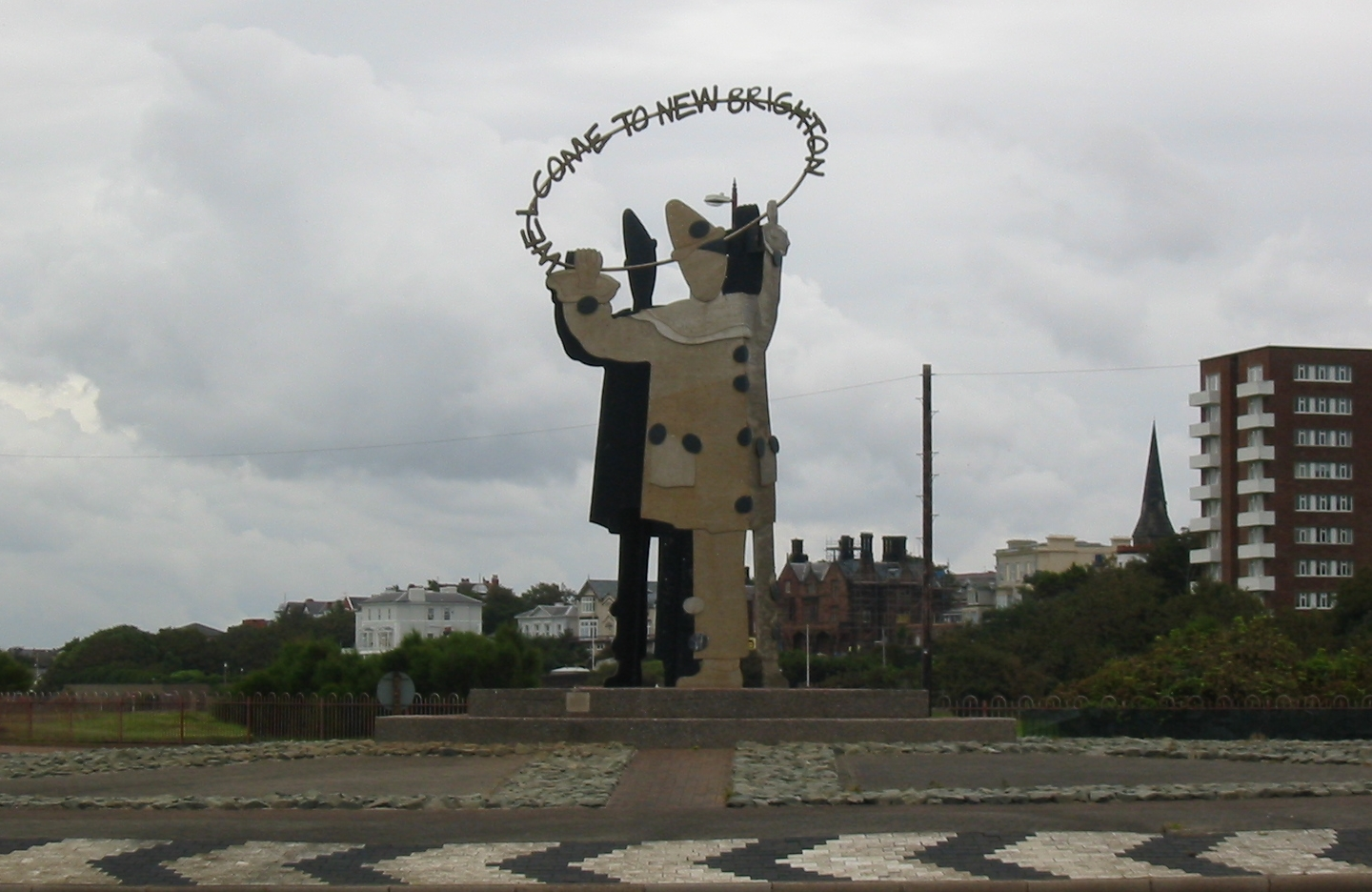
The Welcome to New Brighton Pierrot Sculpture, on a roundabout on King's Parade, on the A554

The main road through New Brighton is the A554. Starting in Bidston, it passes beneath the M53 motorway at junction 1, heads towards the coast and then skirts around it to Birkenhead. The B5143 connects New Brighton with Liscard.

New Brighton railway station is the northern terminus of a branch of the Wirral Line, on the Merseyrail network. The station has a return service to Liverpool Central every 15 minutes during Monday to Saturday daytimes, which reduces to half-hourly at other times.

Bus services are operated primarily by Arriva Merseyside and Stagecoach Merseyside; routes connect the area with Birkenhead, Wallasey and Liverpool.

Until 1971, New Brighton had a landing stage for the Mersey Ferry.

== Notable people ==
Born in New Brighton

- Arthur Bulley, (1861–1942), merchant
- Robert Loraine, (1876–1935), actor
- Jim Dougherty, (1878–1908), footballer
- Vivian Lockett, (1880–1962), Olympian
- Hetty King, (1883–1972), entertainer
- Herbert Rawlinson, (1885–1953), actor
- Bruce Hylton-Stewart, (1891–1972), cricketer
- Miles Dempsey, (1896–1969), soldier
- Malcolm Lowry, (1909–1957), writer
- Wilfrid Lowry, (1900–1974), England rugby player
- John Barrie, (1917–1980), actor
- Graham Stark, (1922–2013), actor and comedian
- Mary Virginia Carey, (1925–1994), writer
- Christopher Greener, (1943–2015), tallest man in the UK
- Annette Ekblom, (1956–), actress
- Gloria Laycock, professor
- Leo Gradwell, (1899–1969), barrister and war hero
- Graham Sayle, (1986–), musician.

Died in New Brighton

- Thomas Frederick Colby, (1784–1852), geographer
- Edwin Waugh, (1817–1890), poet
- Laurence Connolly, (1833–1908), entrepreneur and politician

Other

- Thomas Thorp, (1850–1914), scientific instrument manufacturer, participated in the town planning of New Brighton as an architectural apprentice
- Hall Caine, (1853–1931), writer, resident of New Brighton
- James Howson, (1856–1934), former vicar of New Brighton
- Granville Bantock, (1868–1946), composer and conductor, in 1900 lived at 19 Holland Road
- Nigel Walley, (1941–), musician, resident of New Brighton
- Greg Wilson, (1960–), DJ and producer, raised in New Brighton

== See also ==
- List of places in Merseyside
- Listed buildings in New Brighton, Merseyside
- New Brighton Lifeboat William and Kate Johnstone
