= St James' Church, New Brighton =

Coordinates: 53.4372°N 3.0456°W

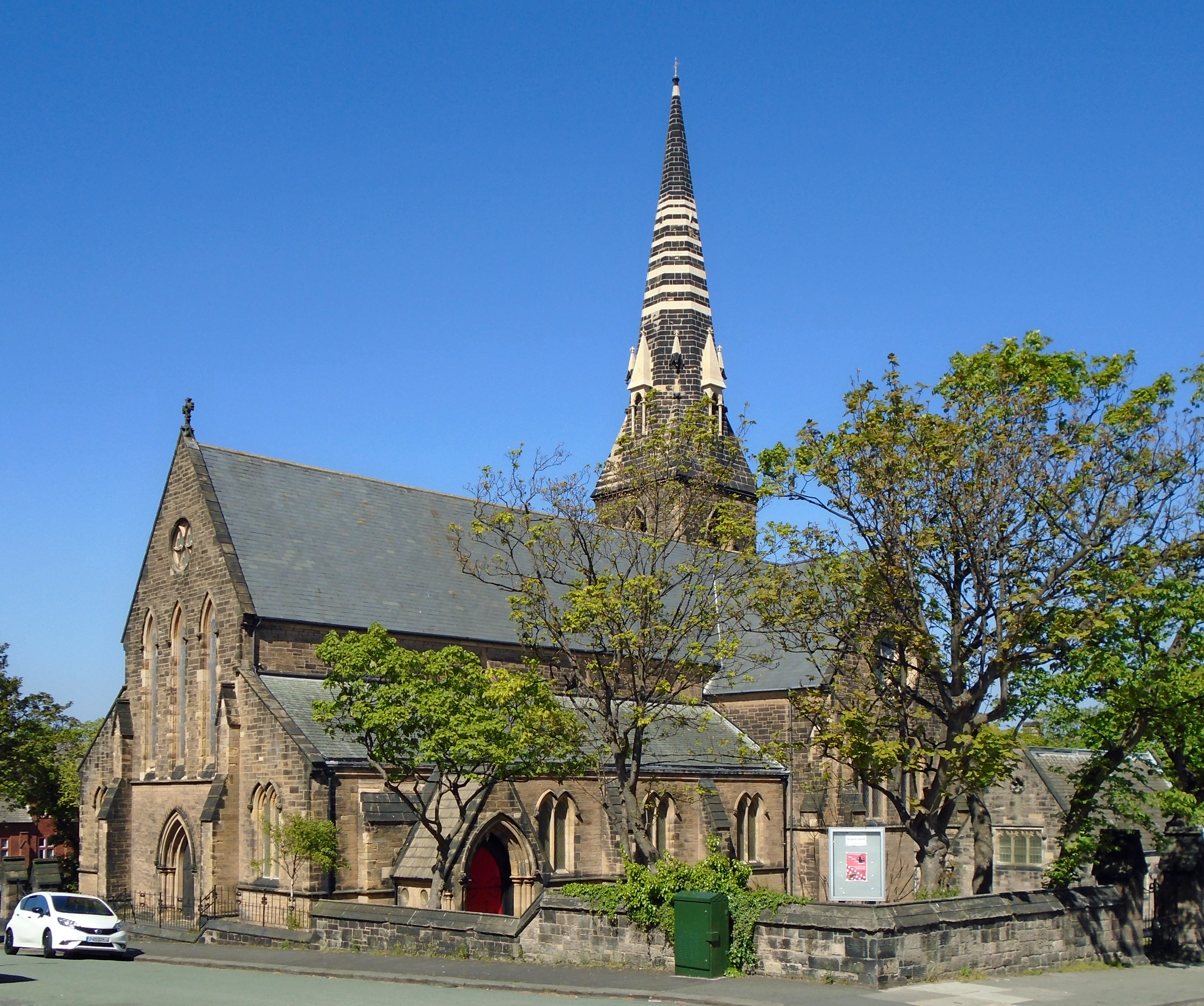
- The church viewed from the southwest, 2017

- Location in Merseyside
- OS grid reference: SJ 307 939
- Location: Victoria Road, New Brighton, Wirral, Merseyside
- Country: England
- Denomination: Anglican
- Churchmanship: Low church
- Website: St James with Emmanuel, New Brighton

History
- Status: Parish church
- Consecrated: 10 July 1856

Architecture
- Functional status: Active
- Heritage designation: Grade II
- Designated: 17 October 1986
- Architect: George Gilbert Scott
- Architectural type: Church
- Style: Gothic Revival
- Groundbreaking: 1854
- Completed: 1856
- Construction cost: £12,523 (including parsonage)

Specifications
- Materials: Stone, slate roof

Administration
- Province: York
- Diocese: Chester
- Archdeaconry: Chester
- Deanery: Wallasey
- Parish: New Brighton, St. James with Emmanuel

Clergy
- Vicar: Revd Heather Atkinson

St James' Church is in Victoria Road, New Brighton, Wirral, Merseyside, England. It is an active Anglican parish church in the deanery of Wallasey, the archdeaconry of Chester and the diocese of Chester. Its benefice is united with that of Emmanuel, New Brighton. The church is recorded in the National Heritage List for England as a designated Grade II listed building.

== History ==
The church was built between 1854 and 1856 to a design by George Gilbert Scott. The foundation stone was laid on 16 February 1854 by the Rt Revd John Graham, Bishop of Chester, and the church was consecrated on 10 July 1856. The total cost of the church and parsonage was £12,523. A south vestry designed by A. R. Keighley was added in 1924.

== Architecture ==
=== Exterior ===
St James' is constructed in stone with a slate roof, and has a cruciform plan. The plan consists of a four-bay nave with a clerestory, north and south aisles under lean-to roofs, north and south transepts, a chancel with a canted east end, a south chapel and vestry, north and south porches, and a steeple at the northeast corner. The windows along the sides of the aisles are paired between buttresses, and in the clerestory are triangular windows. At the west end of the church are gabled buttresses, between which is a doorway. Above the doorway are three lancet windows and a circular window. The transepts also have gabled buttresses and triple lancets, and a rose window on the north and south sides. In the chancel are two-light windows in each of the three sides of the canted east end, and there are two-light windows in the chapel. The tower has angle buttresses and is in four stages. In the bottom stage is an entrance on the east side and blind arcading on the north side. The second stage contains traceried lancets, the third stage has pairs of trefoil-headed windows, and in the top stage are two-light louvred bell openings and a cornice decorated with ballflowers. On top of the tower is a broach spire with lucarnes and a niche above each broach.

=== Interior ===
Inside the church are five-bay arcades with round columns. The chancel arch also has round columns, these having foliate capitals. There is a low iron chancel screen, and a two-bay arcade with a parclose screen between the chancel and the chapel. The timber pulpit is octagonal and decorated with figures. The reredos of 1897 is by A. O. Hemming, who also executed paintings on the chancel walls and ceiling in 1899. The original pipe organ was made in 1891 by Hele and Company, and was repaired by the same company in 1910 following damage caused by a gas explosion. This organ was replaced in 2006 by one moved here by David Wells from St John's Church, Egremont.

== See also ==
- List of new churches by George Gilbert Scott in Northern England
- Listed buildings in New Brighton, Merseyside
