= Grosvenor Casinos =

British casino chain

- Industry: Gambling
- Founded: 1970
- Headquarters: Maidenhead, UK
- Number of locations: 53
- Number of employees: 6,349
- Parent: The Rank Group
- Website: grosvenorcasinos.com

Grosvenor Casinos (formerly County Clubs and Grosvenor Clubs) is a UK-based chain of 53 casinos located in major towns and cities across the UK, with two unbranded sister casinos located in Belgium. Grosvenor Casinos is owned by The Rank Group who operate in the casino, bingo and online gambling industries across Belgium, Spain and the UK.

As of June 2014, revenue was reported at £391.2m, with an operating profit of £56.8m - coming from over 1.7 million customers per year, with over 8.5 million customer visits every year. The Grosvenor casino network employs over 6,300 employees across the UK. Their online casino hosts over 250 games with themes spanning from traditional roulette, blackjack and poker - to the more modern slot styles and live gambling. Grosvenor are licensed and regulated by the UK Gambling Commission.

Originally ‘County Clubs’, the casinos came to be known as ‘Grosvenor Clubs’ and in January 1969, Grosvenor Clubs officially changed its name to ‘Grosvenor Casinos’.

Grosvenor Casinos was the shirt sponsor for Fulham F.C. in the 2017-18 season.

== History ==
=== Acquisition of the Ricoh Arena casino ===
In April 2009, Grosvenor purchased the casino inside the Ricoh Arena complex in Coventry for £650,000.

=== Leaving the British Casino Association ===
During 2009, Grosvenor Casinos announced they were leaving the now defunct British Casino Association (BCA). The BCA existed to promote casino best practice and influence UK government legislation surrounding gambling. Reportedly the BCA began to fail in promoting and improving the casino industry, and once annual membership fees were raised to £140,000, it saw the departure of Grosvenor, just as the large Gala Coral Group had withdrawn in October 2008.

=== Loyalty card scheme ===
In May 2012, the first roll out of a new plastic card service in Grosvenor Casinos was implemented with ‘Grosvenor Play Points’ entering 35 casinos across the UK. This came as a result of the Grosvenor Casinos and Play Points brands merging to create one loyalty card.

=== Gala takeover ===
Grosvenor Casinos completed their takeover of 19 casinos from the Gala Coral Group across the UK on 12 May 2013 making them the largest casino network in the UK. A similar deal to acquire 23 casinos from Gala had previously stalled in 2012 due to a decision by the Competition Commission and OFT. The revised deal in 2013 saw 4 casinos removed from the agreement.

=== Redtooth partnership ===
On 28 April 2014, Grosvenor Casinos announced a two-year partnership with the world's largest live pub poker tournament group Redtooth Poker. Grosvenor Casinos hosted the regional and national UK finals and online events. The move integrated Redtooth Poker and Grosvenor's own poker tournament, the Grosvenor UK Poker Tournament (GUKPT).

== Live events ==
On 25 March 2011, Grosvenor Casinos announced they were to host new poker event called the Goliath. Designed to attract up to 1,500 players, the Goliath had an initial buy-in at £100 + £20 and offered a guaranteed prize pool of £100,000, with 25% of the registration fee going to the Marie Curie Cancer Care charity. The Goliath event in 2014 became the largest poker tournament ever held outside of the US with a total of 3,394 players entering. For the 2015 event Grosvenor estimated over 4,000 participants will enter.

Grosvenor employees also played the highest poker tournament on record at the top of Mount Snowdon in September 2011. The 3,500 ft. stunt was attempted to raise money for the Marie Curie Cancer Care charity, with a total of £11,000 being collected.

== Controversy ==
In December 2006, staff walked out of four Grosvenor Casinos in London in a dispute over pay increases. A month later, around 300 workers went on strike over the same ongoing dispute.

In September 2014, Northern Ireland's Social Development Minister, Nelson McCausland, dismissed the idea that a Grosvenor Casino could open due to the ongoing ban on casinos.

== Technology ==
In November 2011, Grosvenor installed software that would spot cheating at roulette tables. Developed by Ipsotek, the software detects a cheat called "top-hatting", as well as detecting cheating after "last bets" has been called. The software is linked to CCTV cameras monitoring the table at all times.

In October 2012, Grosvenor introduced a new product to the casino industry, Pinball Roulette machines. The new machine offers single player roulette game and the ball is launched by a pinball-style trigger into the wheel. The main feature of the product is that it offered the player control over when they wished to spin the ball. Thirty of the machines, developed by Austrian Gaming Industries, were installed at 22 clubs across the UK.

During November 2013, Evolution Gaming joined Grosvenor Casinos to create a ‘Live Casino’ targeting players on their online casino. The games include blackjack, roulette and baccarat and are available 24hrs a day, 7 days a week. The live game system is designed to produce an environment more closely matching a real casino experience.

In July 2013, Grosvenor Casinos in London, Reading and Coventry created the world's first multi-site cloud casino experience called the IGT Cloud. The new technology offers analytical reporting tools which offer insight into product performance on a game-by-game basis. Operators can remotely change the games on the floor to provide a more customized gambling experience.

Grosvenor Casinos partnered with Tensator in 2014 to create virtual casino hosts. The Tensator Virtual Assistant Ultra stands 50 cm x 50 cm and replicates a live game in real time. The assistant also offers a range of information for players and other frequently asked questions.

In February 2014, The Rank Group and Grosvenor Casinos joined with Jumio to use their Netverify solution. This was integrated into the casino's online database and is designed to provide customers with a more efficient identification procedure. Customers are required to scan their passport or driving licence via their device camera, and Netverify then authenticates it using a range of security features.

In November 2016, Grosvenor Casinos has confirmed the launch of new sports betting offering for its online and land-based players.

In 2022, the Grosvenor Casino brand was complemented by two new niche online brands, The Rialto and The Vic. These new online casino products represent the most popular real world venues in London and extend the Grosvenor Casino's digital footprint.

== Awards ==
=== International Gaming Awards ===
Grosvenor and Rank were awarded the 'Casino Operator of the Year' award at the 2013 International Gaming Awards. Rank Group were awarded the 'Socially Responsible Operator of the Year Land Based' award in 2014 and 2015.

=== Women in Gaming Awards ===
Grosvenor Casinos’ HR team were awarded Team of the Year at the Women in Gaming independent annual awards in June 2012. The team, led by Fiona Regan Head of HR, were awarded for their successful Hearts and Minds initiative, which focused on internal and employee recognition.

In 2014, they won the same award whilst also picking up the Inspiration of the Year award.
