= Patrick Carnegie Simpson =

Scottish clergyman (1865–1947)

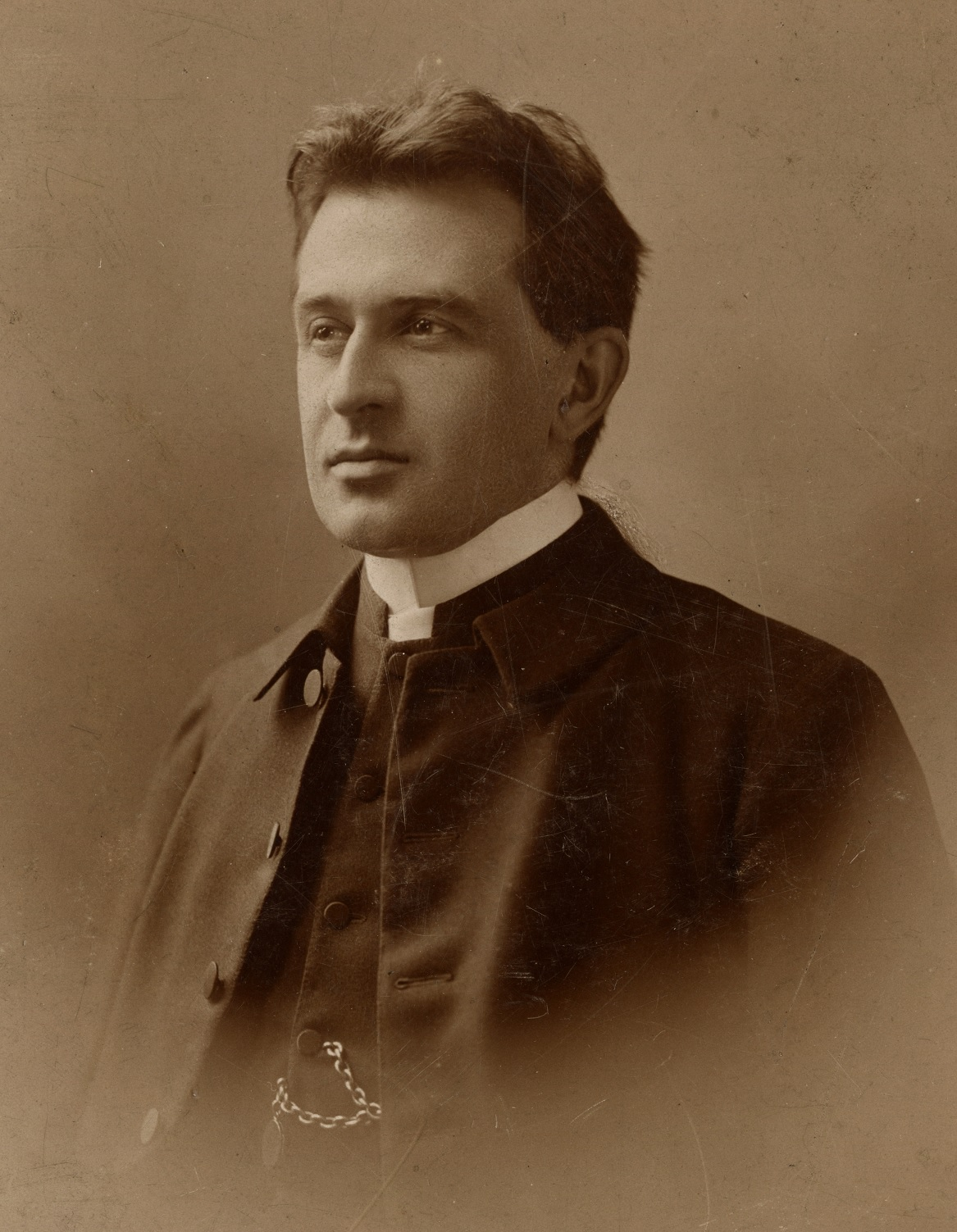
- Simpson c. 1900
- Born: 1865; Horsham, then part of the Colony of Victoria (now Australia)
- Died: 1947 (aged 81–82); Cambridge, England
- Resting place: Cherry Hinton churchyard
- Education: George Watson's College; Edinburgh University; New College, Edinburgh
- Occupations: Minister; church historian; author
- Writings: The Fact of Christ (1900); The Life of Principal Rainy (1909)
- Congregations served: Christchurch, Wallington 1895; Renfield Church, Glasgow 1899; Egremont Church, Wallasey 1911

Moderator of the Federal Council of the Evangelical Free Churches
- In office 1926–1927

Moderator of the General Assembly of the Presbyterian Church of England
- In office 1928–1928

Patrick Carnegie Simpson (1865–1947) was a Scottish Presbyterian minister, church historian, and author. He is noted for his involvement in the early 20th-century Scottish Church Crisis, his contributions to ecumenical dialogue and inter-church relations, and his long tenure as Professor of Church History at Westminster College, Cambridge (1914–1937).

In the years leading up to the Scottish Church Crisis, Carnegie Simpson collaborated with Principal Robert Rainy, his former professor at New College, Edinburgh, in efforts to secure the union of the Free Church of Scotland and the United Presbyterian Church.

During the Inter-War period, Carnegie Simpson played a role in inter-church relations, particularly during the Lambeth Conversations and the Revised Prayer Book controversy. He authored a number of books, most notably The Fact of Christ (1900) and The Life of Principal Rainy (1909). In 1928, Carnegie Simpson was elected Moderator of the General Assembly of the Presbyterian Church of England. He retired from Westminster College in 1937.

== Early life and education ==
Carnegie Simpson was born in 1865 in Horsham, Victoria. His father, Rev. Patrick Simpson of the Free Church of Scotland, arrived in Australia as a missionary in 1858. Ten years later, he returned to Scotland following the death of Carnegie's mother. After his father's death in 1873, Carnegie and his siblings were raised by their aunt in a Presbyterian household in Morningside, Edinburgh.

Carnegie Simpson was educated at George Watson's College, and in 1882 was admitted to Edinburgh University, where he pursued an M.A. in Humanities. While at university, he participated in the social and political aspects of undergraduate life, graduating in 1885 with first-class honours in philosophy. He spent the following summer semester in Heidelberg, Germany, subsequently enrolling at New College, Edinburgh, the Theological Hall of the Free Church of Scotland, which at the time was transitioning from Calvinistic conservatism to a more flexible evangelical liberalism.

== Career ==
After completing his studies in Heidelberg, Simpson began his clerical training with a probationary assistantship at St John's Free Church in Largs, Ayrshire, before moving to Free St Andrew’s in Edinburgh. In 1894, he married Agnes Schmalz from Copenhagen. After a brief period of engaging in literary work for Sir William Robertson Nicoll, editor of the British Weekly, in London, he was ordained in 1895 by the Presbytery of London South, and inducted into the charge of Christchurch, Wallington, London.

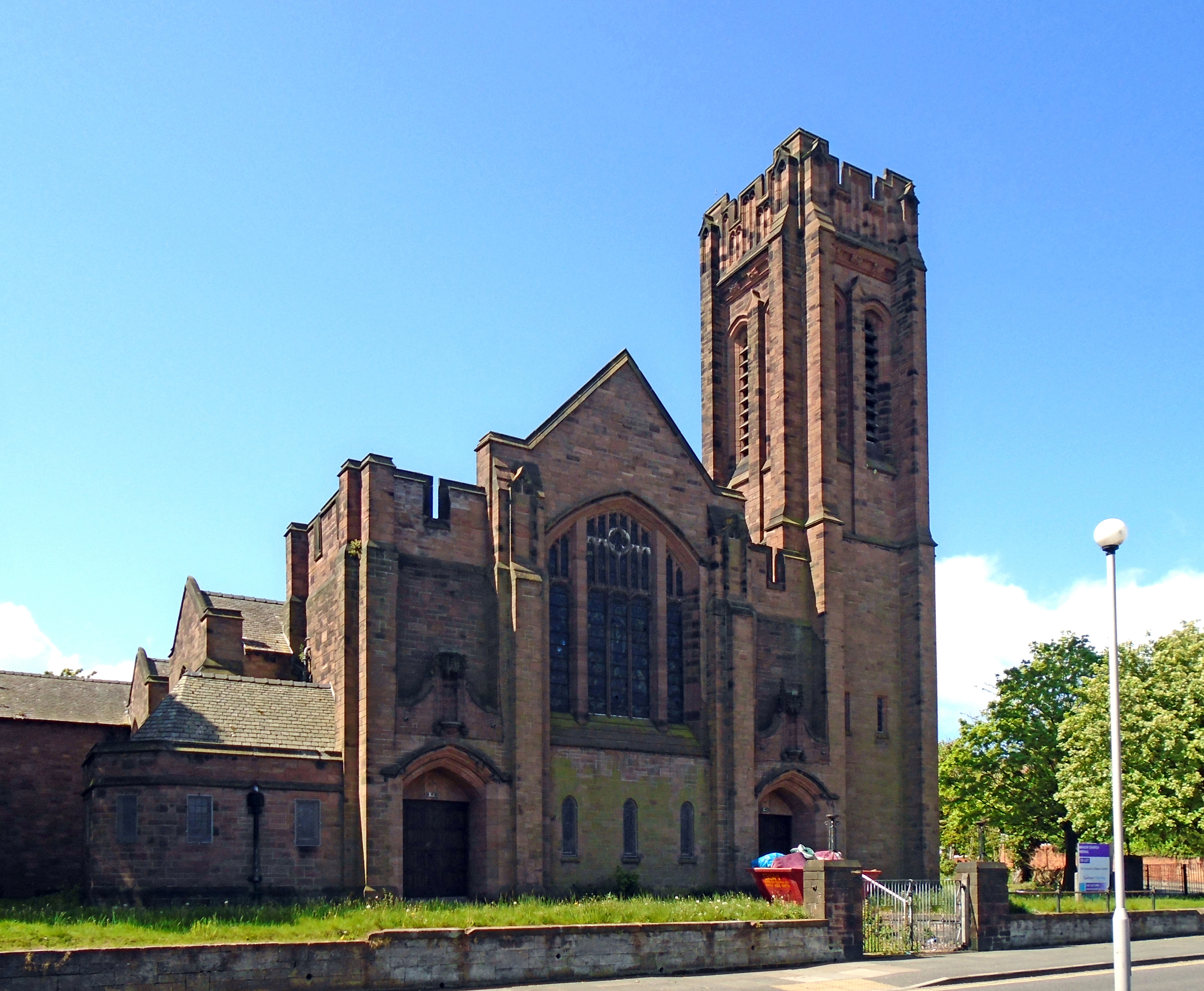
Egremont Presbyterian Church in Wallasey on the Wirral

In 1899, Simpson moved to Scotland to become Minister at Renfield Church, Glasgow, one of the principal Free Church congregations, where he remained until 1911. He arrived at the time of the Scottish Church crisis and became engaged in the turmoil of ecclesiastical politics. He wrote two books during this time, The Fact of Christ and The Life of Principal Rainy. While at St John's Renfield Church, he became friends with James Denney, who held the chair of New Testament Language and Literature at Free Church College, Glasgow.

In 1911, Carnegie Simpson returned to England to become Minister at the Presbyterian Church in Egremont, Wallasey, the largest Presbyterian church in the country.

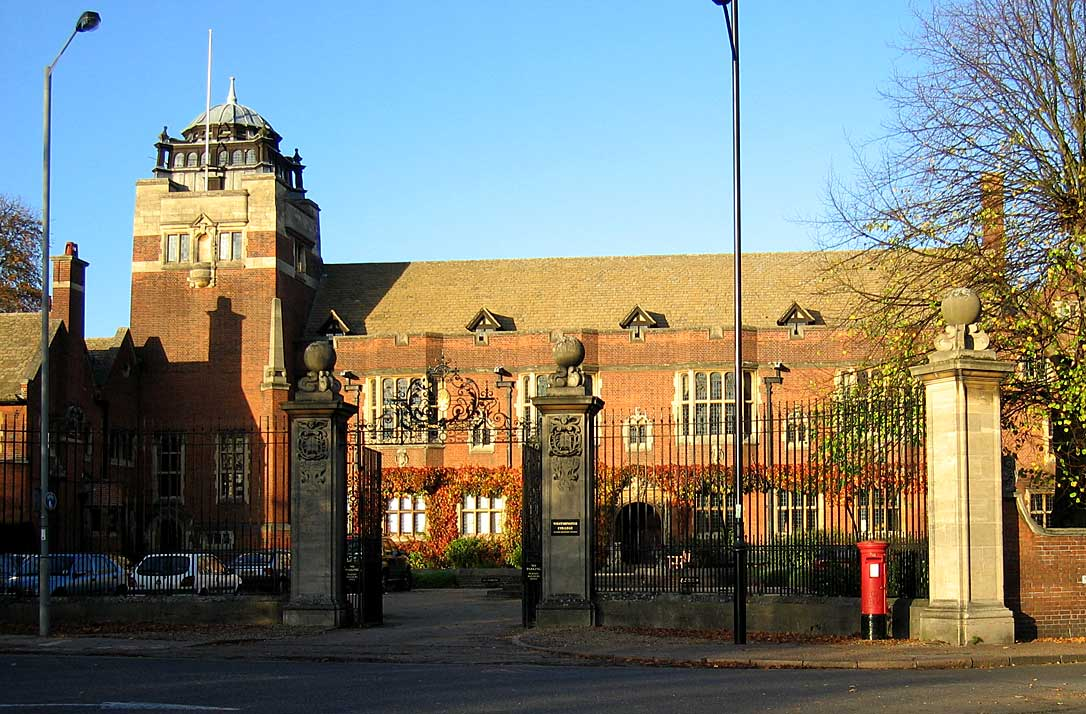
Westminster College, Cambridge

His ministry at Egremont Presbyterian Church was brief, ending in 1914 when he was appointed to the chair of Church History at Westminster College, Cambridge.

=== Post-war ===
During the 1920s, Carnegie Simpson was once more drawn into the arena of Church affairs. He was most notably involved in the negotiations arising from the Lambeth Conference, the Prayer Book Controversy, and the setting up of the Federal Council of the Evangelical Free Churches to foster cooperation between the nonconformist denominations. Carnegie Simpson became Moderator of the Federal Council of the Evangelical Free Churches of England in the years 1926–1927, and in 1928, he was elected Moderator of the General Assembly, the highest office and final court of appeal in the Presbyterian Church of England. Disappointed by the failure of the Lambeth Conversations after the 1930 Lambeth Conference, Carnegie Simpson's role in Church politics in the 1930s declined. In 1937, at the age of 72, he retired from Westminster College, where he was elected Professor Emeritus.

== The Scottish Church crisis ==
The early 20th century was a period of unrest in the Free Church of Scotland. This was due to the discord, and at times intense friction, between the majority of congregants under the leadership of Principal Rainy, who championed the movement for union with the United Presbyterian Church, and a dissenting minority – later to become known as the "Wee Free Kirk". This minority, who mostly hailed from the Highlands and Western Isles, disagreed with the more liberal and evangelical interpretation of the Westminster Confession of Faith, and claimed to be the sole authentic representatives of the Free Church. When the union between the Free Church and the United Presbyterians was finally proclaimed in 1900 (to form the "United Free Church"), a lawsuit was filed by the 'Wee Frees' disputing its legality.

=== House of Lords' ruling ===
Although initially rejected in Scottish courts, the lawsuit was upheld on appeal by the 1904 House of Lords. It was the confusion resulting from the dispossession of the United Free Church majority from the entirety of the Church buildings, real estate, and financial assets that constituted the "Scottish Church Crisis". The affair took on such proportions that the Government in Westminster considered it necessary to set up a parliamentary commission, which resulted in the unprecedented "Churches (Scotland) Act", which overruled the House of Lords' decision and restored to the United Free Church all those assets, except those which the minority could feasibly use.

== Ecclesiastical and academic career ==
=== The Scottish experience ===
Carnegie Simpson moved back to Scotland in 1899 to take up his Ministry at Renfield, just one year before the unification of the two Churches, where he found himself confronted with the conflicting factions. He was drawn into the debate in support of Rainy and, according to an editorial in the Journal of Presbyterian Historical Society of England, it was this experience that served as his apprenticeship in ecclesiastical affairs and as a negotiator. His reputation spread rapidly. He became the youngest member of the Assembly's "Advisory Committee", which had been set up by Rainy to manage the situation and was called on to address meetings across Scotland and in London, to write pamphlets and articles for the press, and to negotiate with landlords to obtain land for temporary places of worship. During the same period, he carried several motions in the General Assembly and was appointed to several other committees, including the committee set up in 1909 to examine the issue of union between the Church of Scotland and the United Free Church, which was released by the Act of Union in 1929.

=== Return to England ===
For Carnegie Simpson, the intense involvement as both the author of Rainy's biography and a participant in ecclesiastical politics was simply overwhelming. As a result, to escape from the overload of work (which had meant, as he acknowledged, that he had not been able to satisfy his pastoral duties at Renfield as fully as he would have wished), he accepted a Ministry at Egremont in 1911 that would allow him to devote himself more to pastoral work.

=== Teaching ===
In 1914, one month before the war broke out, Carnegie Simpson was elected by the Synod of the Presbyterian Church of England to the Chair of "Church History" at Westminster College, Cambridge. During the war period, teaching at Westminster was suspended, and Carnegie Simpson carried out chaplaincy for the 1st Eastern General Hospital and was in charge of the congregation at St John's Wood, London.

Carnegie Simpson is not remembered as a scholar, but rather as a teacher, less concerned with detailed historical analysis than in providing his students with a broad framework of the underlying essentials. According to Hay Colligan, Carnegie Simpson's professorship at Westminster was characterised by a widening of the scope of the subject beyond the strict realms of Presbyterianism to a more global, historical view of "the general development of doctrine, dogma and polity."

=== Negotiator ===
Despite his pre-war lack of enthusiasm for ecclesiastical affairs, Carnegie Simpson was drawn back into the world of Church politics and committee work. This proved to be an area in which he excelled, and he participated in negotiations and arbitrations, as noted by contemporaries. It is particularly for his efforts to foster greater cooperation and mutual understanding between the different denominations of the Church that his work is remembered. In the words of Professor Healey, it was what Carnegie Simpson did "beyond the strict bounds of the English Presbyterian Church, his impact was most significant in the realm of inter-Church relations."

Over the following 10 years, he participated in the following areas:

==== Federal Council of the Evangelical Free Churches ====
In 1919, the Federal Council of the Evangelical Free Churches was set up to encourage cooperation between the different denominations. Carnegie Simpson assisted in the drafting of its constitution and was the chief author of the Statement of Faith. He was elected Moderator of the council for two consecutive years (1926–27).

==== Lambeth Conversations ====
The First World War acted as a catalyst for change. In 1920, the Anglican Church launched the "Lambeth Appeal to all Christian People", proposing closer association with the nonconformist Churches, and thus marking a fundamental change in attitude towards inter-Church relations. The Federal Council of the Evangelical Free Churches responded favourably to this ecumenical gesture, and a committee was set up, chaired by Carnegie Simpson, who drafted the reply – "The Free Churches and the Lambeth Appeal," – and participated with notable vigour in the ensuing negotiations. As a result, strong and lasting ties, both personnel and inter-denominational, were made with the Anglican Church. These negotiations, however, turned out to be fruitless and were terminated in 1930. Carnegie Simpson expressed his disappointment at this outcome in a letter to The Times.

==== New Prayer Book ====
In order to better meet the needs of the new century, and because of growing incoherence and disparity in the use of the liturgical rites in the Church of England, a reformulation of the Book of Common Prayer was needed. After 20 years of deliberation, the final version was presented to Parliament in 1927, generating intense debate. Insofar as the Church of England is the Established Church of the Realm, the controversy became a question of national importance with direct implications for all the nonconformist denominations. There was fear of the current increasing ritualism, that the Reformation Settlement might be imperilled, while more extreme opinions evoked the concern of a return to "all the errors and horrors of Roman Catholicism".

On 17 September 1927, Carnegie Simpson wrote a memorandum to the Ecclesiastical Committee, pointing to the shortcomings and ambiguities of the text, and the need for the Free Churches to obtain strong guarantees before approving it. In reply to this, Archbishop Randall Davidson invited Carnegie Simpson to Lambeth Palace, where the memorandum formed the basis of the discussions between the various parties. Unlike the majority of the Free Churches, Carnegie Simpson was not fundamentally hostile to the project, believing that a satisfactory compromise could be found. However, this "Simpson position" did not prevail, and the project was finally rejected by Parliament on 15 December 1927.

==== General Assembly of the Presbyterian Church of England ====
Carnegie Simpson became convener of the Business Committee of the General Assembly of the Presbyterian Church of England in 1920, a post which he held for 11 years. His period of tenure was acknowledged as being particularly successful.

==== Moderator ====
In 1928, Carnegie Simpson was elected Moderator of the General Assembly of the Presbyterian Church of England.

==== Presbyterian Historical Society of England ====
Carnegie Simpson was a strong supporter of the Society from the time of its creation in 1913 and served as its Honorary President from 1925 to 1947.

==== Westminster College Memorial Chapel ====
Carnegie Simpson served as an intermediary between Sir William and Lady Noble and Westminster College, concerning the donation of the Memorial Chapel in commemoration of their son, who was killed on the Belgian front in 1915.

== Death ==
Carnegie Simpson died on 22 December 1947, aged 80, in Cambridge and was buried in Cherry Hinton churchyard.

== Notable works ==
Carnegie Simpson is noted for two of his books, both of which were written in the early days of his career.

The Fact of Christ (1900) Carnegie Simpson's first book "gave him a permanent reputation". It rapidly became a national and international success and was translated into at least seven languages. Between 1900 and 2012, 36 editions were published, and readings from it were programmed by the BBC. The book, an apologetics in answer to the "rising assault of agnosticism", was based on a series of lectures given at evening classes in his early years at Renfield, and aimed at "the honest doubter". The Fact of Christ avoids dogma and theology to focus on "the simplicity of Christianity and its emphasis upon life rather than orthodoxy …"

Contents: 1. The Data of Christianity – 2. What is the Fact of Christ? – 3. The First Meaning of the Fact: i) The Christian Character ii) The Moral Motive-Power – 4. The Further Meaning of the Fact: i) The Foundation of Faith ii) "And the Word was God" – 5. The Final Meaning of the Fact: i) The Reality of Sin ii) The Problem of Forgiveness. Addendum: The Principles of Atonement – 6. What is a Christian?

The Life of Principal Rainy (1909) In 1907, Carnegie Simpson was invited to write the biography of the recently deceased Robert Rainy, the most prominent figure in the Scottish Church at the time. Carnegie Simpson had known Rainy well, having studied under him for 4 years at New Hall, and through their close collaboration during the Scottish Church Crisis. The two-volume biography of the man, considered by many as one of the charismatic leaders and founding fathers of the Free Church, is as Carnegie Simpson notes in the preface, "in many respects an ecclesiastical history as well as a biography". Amongst other things, the book discusses at length Rainy's role in the notorious heresy trial brought against Professor William Robertson Smith, and the legal crisis triggered by the House of Lords' ruling against the Scottish Free Church in 1904. The work received widespread academic acclaim, and led to an honorary degree of D.D. from St Andrew's University.

Other publications of Carnegie Simpson include:

The Facts of Life in Relation to Faith (1913) In the sequel to The Fact of Christ, Carnegie Simpson explores in greater depth some of the questions raised in his first book in relation to the political and social problems posed by the changing, modern world.

Contents: 1. The Creed of Experience – 2. The Indifferent World – 3. The Problem of Pain – 4. The Atheistic Fact – 5. The Reality of Christ – 6. The Claim of Humanism – 7. The Veto of Death – 8. The Comment of Today

Church Principles (1923) Based on notes written to serve as guidelines for the presentation of the Free Church position during the long negotiations resulting from the Lambeth Appeal on Christian Unity, this volume reviews "the salient and guiding principles … of ecclesiastical life and order". The last chapter is more speculative and concerns the practical outcomes of considering the Church as a living entity.

Contents: 1. The Creative Fact – 2. The Visible Body – 3. People and Ministry – 4. Word and Sacrament – 5. Scripture and Creed – 6. Freedom and the State – 7. The Living Church

Westminster College Chapel, Cambridge. The Gift of Sir. W. J. Noble, Bart., and Lady Noble (1926) This monograph, written in collaboration with Sir and Lady Noble, and with descriptive notes by Carnegie Simpson, commemorates the erection of the Memorial Chapel, funded by the Nobles, in memory of their son killed in the First World War. The chapel is noted for its fine stained glass windows illustrating the Benedicite and was designed by the Scottish artist Douglas Strachan.

The Church and the State (1929) Here, Carnegie Simpson gives a general overview from the standpoint of the Free Church on the evolution of the relations between civil and ecclesiastical institutions, from New Testament times to the present day. It is written in light of his experiences with Rainy during the Scottish Church Crisis and, as the dedication to Archbishop Davidson implies, the Lambeth conversations and the Prayer Book controversy.

Contents: 1. The War and the Peace – 2. The Established Religion – 3. The Pope and the Emperor – 4. The Seeds of Reform – 5. Reformation Settlements: i) German and Genevan ii) British – 6. The Growth of Toleration – 7. Modern Developments – 8. The Present Situation

Essentials: A Few Plain Essays on the Main Things (1930) This volume stands apart from the others, as it is not aimed specifically at an audience of believers or the orthodox. It is more a general reflection on life and the lessons that are to be drawn from the human experience. He explores the role of work, love, happiness, suffering, friendship, the idealism of youth, and the satisfaction of maturity. It is "the work of Simpson the Christian man rather than the Church historian."

Contents: 1. Introductory – 2. Love and Life – 3. Work and Life – 4. Why be Moral? – 5. Experience – 6. Belief in God – 7. Venit Hesperus – 8. Conclusion

The Evangelical Church Catholic. The Thirteenth Series of the Chalmers' Lectures (1934) This book is a reflection on some of the "capital elements in the character, structure, and function of Christ's Church as we find these exhibited and as we would see them developed …" In particular, Carnegie Simpson examines the danger of "Ecclesiastical Materialism," that is to say, the tendency for the spiritual character of the Church to become obscured by the exterior structure.
(N.B. An American edition of this book was published (1935) under the title: The Fact of the Christian Church.)

Contents: 1. The Church, a Continuous Life – 2. The Religion of the Evangel – 3. Gospel in Word and Sacrament – 4. The Development of Doctrine – 5. Elements of Order and Unity – 6. The Evangel and Civilization

Recollections – Mainly Ecclesiastical but Sometimes Human (1943): As its name suggests, this, his last book, is autobiographical, except for the epilogue in which Carnegie Simpson returns to reflect on certain fundamental issues of life. It is generally lighter in tone, containing a profusion of anecdotes and insightful remarks on Church politics, and the colleagues and personalities he knew. In doing so, the book reveals much about lesser-known and more personal traits of Simpson.

Contents: 1. Up to 1911 Scotland – 2. From 1911 England – 3. Epilogue i) The Validity of Faith ii) The Value of Life

Love Never Faileth (1902): This romantic novel was written, according to the author, during a summer holiday shortly after his marriage in "a slight effort... to amuse my wife". This escapade into such a different realm casts an interesting light on the multiple facets of the very humane person behind the distinguished divine. Although the book's literary merits seem doubtful, Carnegie Simpson is sufficiently attached to it to afford it several lines in Recollections, even if his remarks are made with his characteristic, wry humour.

=== Short texts, papers, lectures ===
Carnegie Simpson edited and made contributions to a number of other books, and a certain number of his more important conferences were published. See the Bibliography below.

=== Letter writer, articles to the press ===
Carnegie Simpson was a prolific letter writer and contributor to the general press, not only on strictly ecclesiastical questions, but also about more general social problems such as Living wages for miners, Nurse Cavell, The treatment of mental patients, The legitimacy of war, Marriage in the modern world, H. G. Wells, The atomic bomb, and other subjects.

== Personal life ==
In a letter addressed to The Times in 1907, Carnegie Simpson appealed to readers to allow him access to personal documents to assist him in the writing of the biography of Principal Rainy. "A biographer", he explained, "must illustrate other aspects ... besides that of the public ecclesiastic" for, as he was fond of saying, "a man's career is one thing, and his life is another". Likewise, for Carnegie Simpson, over and above an account of the career of the eminent churchman, the talented negotiator, and the successful author, it is necessary to make some attempt to portray the "inner man".

=== Personality ===
Hay Colligan, in his appreciation of 1938, writes: "Dr. Simpson has that undeniable quality we call personality" and, in echo to this, Professor Healey titles his retrospective article in 1972, "Patrick Carnegie Simpson. A Man of Style." This question of style is first and foremost apparent in his writing and public speaking. Many of his contemporaries comment on not only his command of language and his wide-ranging humanist culture, but equally on the clarity of his arguments.

Intimately linked to his public charisma are two other traits, namely his fairness in dealing with opposing opinions in debate, and his abiding sense of humour, which played no small part in his success as a negotiator. Humour had more than a superficial place in his system of values. This "twinkling eye of truth", as he calls it, is one of the essentials if one is to keep "a balanced view of things". Even in his most serious academic writings, he cannot resist resorting to tongue-in-cheek commentaries. Hung framed above his desk, was:

- "Non es sanctior si laudaris, nec vilior si vituperaris. Quod es, hoc es; nec melior dici vales quam Deo teste sis."
- (Praise adds nothing to your holiness, nor does blame take anything from it. You are what you are, and you cannot be said to be better than you are in the sight of God.)

This may go some way to explaining why his wit is, at times, readily employed to point to any signs of pretension or self-inflation and could be scathingly caustic. His humour was mild and indulgent, not infrequently marshalled at the expense of the clergy, and very often self-deprecatory.

Carnegie Simpson had a keen interest in travel and cultural pursuits. As he says in Essentials, "It is a good and great thing to travel through this wide and wonderful world". He delighted in the multifaceted nature of life, in the beauty to be found in the natural world and literature, and in the "idealism of young people" He enjoyed challenge and action, and relished in the "cut and thrust" of discussion and debate. Carnegie Simpson was, according to Professor Healy, " committed to his religious faith, as is reflected in his writings by his preoccupation with the eternal questions of the suffering of the innocent, of social injustice, and of despair.

Nevertheless, this did not prevent him from delighting in a certain "mischievous irreverence", a shying away from the pitfalls of too rigid obedience to any doxa. He makes it clear that he feels ill at ease with a religion that is too facile, too comforting, that sweeps away all doubts. One of his recurrent themes is that "religion cannot answer all the questions", and he insists that "even when a man who is counted religious, is only religious, he is incomplete". This dichotomy between belief and a necessary skepticism was mirrored in life by his well-known predilection for mixing in other than clerical circles.

=== Critical judgements ===
While it is certain that Carnegie Simpson relished in the "comédie humaine", enjoying, as Healey puts it, the company of men and women of all sorts, "whether in Episcopal palaces or in public houses", the other side of the coin is that the arresting style and the high-profile stances he adopted could not receive universal approval. The "Wee Frees" in no way subscribed to the position he took in the Scottish Church Crisis. Others complained that his search for compromise with the Anglicans and Church unity did not reflect the opinion of the Presbyterian rank and file, and the obvious pleasure with which Carnegie Simpson narrates his encounters with the Kalos kagathos (The beautiful and the good) and otherworldly acquaintances was not always to everyone's taste; to some, such manifest urbanity was not quite appropriate.

Others are critical of his lack of orthodoxy; a reviewer in Biblica Sacra talks of what he calls "an unwholesome steering away from accepted and tested modes of expression." Lumsden, and the Dictionary of Scottish Church History & Theology, regret a tendency towards hagiography in his most highly considered book, The Life of Principal Rainy. Swanton is more severe, going so far as to suggest that Carnegie Simpson was "too closely identified with Rainy to evaluate his character and actions with the desired objectivity". Equally, on occasion, Carnegie Simpson voiced opinions on ethical and political questions or indulged in sweeping generalisations which, with the advantage of hindsight, may be considered with askance.

=== Family ===
During a trip to Norway, Carnegie Simpson met his future wife, the daughter of a Danish Lutheran pastor, whom he married in 1894. Agnes Schmalz came from a very different background to the austere Presbyterian environment in which Carnegie Simpson had been brought up. She was an accomplished pianist and Lieder singer accustomed to moving in cosmopolitan and artistic circles. One of Carnegie Simpson's earliest publications, a joint publication in collaboration with his wife, is a translation from the German book dedicated to the life of Richard Wagner. They had one child, a daughter, Agnes Margaret Carnegie Simpson, who was among the pioneering generation of women doctors, qualifying from Edinburgh University in 1924.

== Bibliography ==
=== Publications by Carnegie Simpson ===
==== Books ====
- The Fact of Christ. A series of Lectures. London: Hodder and Stoughton. 1900. OCLC 263027230.
- Love Never Faileth. An emotion touched by moralities. New York – Chicago – Toronto: Fleming H. Revell Company. 1902. OCLC 26666401.
- The Life of Principal Rainy (2 Volumes). London: Hodder and Stoughton. 1909. OCLC 2200112.
- The Facts of Life in Relation to Faith. London – New York – Toronto: Hodder & Stoughton. 1913. OCLC 9471082.
- Church Principles. London, England: Hodder and Stoughton. 1923. OCLC 6103331.
- Westminster College Chapel, Cambridge. The gift of Sir. W. J. Noble, Bart., and Lady Noble. Newcastle-upon-Tyne: Andrew Reid & Company. 1926. OCLC 17163357.
- The Revised Prayer Book and Reservation. London. 1927. OCLC 314672565.
- The Church and the State (The Living Church Series). London, England: James Clarke. 1929. OCLC 2159415.
- Essentials. A Few Plain Essays on the Main Things. London, England: Hodder and Stoughton. 1930. OCLC 2609144.
- The Evangelical Church Catholic (The Thirteenth Series of the Chalmers' Lectures). London, England: Hodder and Stoughton. 1934. OCLC 2857891. (An American edition of this book was published in 1935 under the title: The Fact of the Christian Church. New York: Fleming H. Revell company. OCLC 1224335)
- Recollections: Mainly Ecclesiastical but Sometimes Human. London, England: Nisbet and Company. 1943. OCLC 16912074.

==== Contributions to books, journals, conferences ... ====
- "The Free Church of Scotland – A Lecture". (Printed by Request). Edinburgh: Macniven and Wallace. 1893. OCLC 316629061. Retrieved: 22 March 2015.
- von Wolzogen, Hans (1894). Erinnerungen an Richard Wagner [Recollections of Richard Wagner]. Translated by Agnes Simpson; Patrick Carnegie Simpson. Bayreuth: C. Giessel. OCLC 28592294.
- "The Realist among the Disciples". The Expositor. 4: 429–438. 1894.
- "Jacob's Wrestle – A Man and his Fate". The Expositor. 8: 391–400. 1898.
- 1904. "Is there a Life after Death?" In: Questions of Faith: A Series of Lectures on the Creed. Ed. Carnegie Simpson. London, England: Hodder and Stoughton. OCLC 14245621.
- 1904. "Samuel." In: Men of the Old Testament: Cain to David. Ed. George Milligan. London, England: James Robinson.
- 1904. "The Mother of our Lord." In: Women of the Bible: Rebekah to Priscilla. Ed. Lewis, Howell Elvet, et al. Manchester: Robinson.
- 1905. "Judas Iscariot." In: Men of the New Testament: Mathew to Timothy. Ed. George Milligan. Manchester: James Robinson. OCLC 4168896
- 1907. The Site of Union. Some Plain Words on the Establishment Question in the Scottish Church. London, England: Christian Union. OCLC – 314672569
- "Agnosticism in Dogma, Method and Life". Religion and the Modern Mind: Lectures delivered before the Glasgow university society of St. Ninian with an introduction by Donald MacAlister. London, England: Hodder and Stoughton. 1908. OCLC 17493812. Retrieved 3 April 2015.
- 1922, "Catholicity and Presbytery." (An address given at Bristol Cathedral at the invitation of the Anglican Church). In: The Lambeth Joint Report on Church Unity : a Discussion. London, England: Hodder and Stoughton. pp. 105–125. OCLC 17493812.
- 1923. "Its Revelation in Christ." In: Christian Unity and the Gospel. Eds. Kenneth Ingham, Henry Wace, Carnegie Simpson ... London, England: Hodder and Stoughton.
- "Two Church Movements: Anglican and Scottish. A Comparison of the Anglo-Catholic Revival and the Free Church of Scotland". Presbyterian Historical Society of England. Third annual lecture. Manchester: Aikman. 1925. OCLC 32957798.
- 1927. "Continental Protestantism and the English Reformation." By Frederick J. Smithen. (Foreword by Carnegie Simpson.) London, England: James Clarke and Co Ltd. OCLC 877709
- 1930. "Lambeth 1920 – A Free Church Presentation." In: The Call for Christian Unity: The Challenge of a World Situation. Eds. V.F. Storr, G.H. Harris. London, England: Hodder and Stoughton.
- "Christ and Immortality (Broadcast talks)". Christ in the Changing world. London: Hodder and Stoughton, G.T. Rogers, et al. 1932. OCLC 314617844.
- "The Problem of Pain". The Lutterworth Papers. No. 20. Cambridge, England: Lutterworth Press. 1933. OCLC 32709787.
- "The Character of Presbytery". Presbyterian Historical Society of England, Annual Lecture. No. 13. Manchester: R. Aikman & Son. 1937. OCLC 37954675.
- "Criticism and Ministry". A Charge Given at the Induction by the Presbytery of North London of John Young Campbell, D.D. to the Chair of New Testament Language, Literature and Theology in Westminster College, Cambridge. Cambridge, England: Foister & Jagg. 1945.

==== Articles in the general press ====
- "Principal Rainy". The Times. 16 December 1907.
- "The Struggling God." (Comments on H.G. Wells' "Mr Britling sees it through.") The British Weekly. (28 December 1916).
- "We must continue to love right more than peace..." (Report on a sermon) The Times. (18 December 1916).
- "The Strain of Sympathy – Lambeth Appeal Comment". The British Weekly. 26 August 1920.
- "Unity". The British Weekly. 6 June 1922.
- "The Christian Ruling in the Industrial Deadlock". The British Weekly. June 1926.
- "Appeal for funds for the treatment of mental health". The Times. 29 June 1929.
- "Reunion – A Free Church View". The Spectator. 11 November 1932. p. 8. Retrieved: 22 January 2015.
- 1935. "Distrust of Liberty". (A report on an address) The Times. (22 October 1935).
- "Archbishop Lord Lang: An Appreciation". The Times. 12 August 1945.
- "The Atomic Bomb". The British Weekly. 1945. p. 275.
- "So this is marriage". The Listener. 1 August 1946.
- "The Last Words of H.G. Wells". The British Weekly. 29 August 1946.

=== References ===
- Anonymous (1928). "Patrick Carnegie Simpson M.A., D.D". Journal of Presbyterian Historical Society of England. I (4): 3–5.
- Barbour, G. F. (1923). The Life of Alexander Whyte. London: Hodder & Stoughton, Limited.
- Bell, G. K. A. (1948). "Letter to Dr Harcus". Journal of Presbyterian Historical Society of England. IX (1).
- "The House of Lords' Decision". The Sacred Heart Review. Vol. 32, no. 9. 27 August 1904. p. 6.
- British History online. The City of Cambridge: Theological Colleges. Retrieved: 31 March 2015.
- Brown, P. H. (1911). History of Scotland to the Present Time. Cambridge University Press. p. 386.
- Cambell, Ian (1999). "The Church of Scotland 1840–1940. An Overview". Quodlibet. 1 (8).
- The Cambrian News. (1927). cited by Maiden, 2007. Retrieved: 23 January 2015.
- Carruthers, S. W. (1935). "The Evangelical Church Catholic". Journal of Presbyterian Historical Society of England. V (4): 236–237.
- Carruthers, S. W. (1948). "Tribute to Carnegie Simpson as Convenor of the Business Committee". Journal of the Presbyterian Historical Society of England. IX (1): 8–9.
- Cheyne, A.C. (1996). New College, Edinburgh 1846–1996 – The Spirit of New College Retrieved: 31 March 2015.
- The Churches (Scotland) Act. (1905). Retrieved: 17 April 2015.
- The Churchman (1928). Notes and Comments: "Our Changing Church." London, England: The Church Society, Eliot Stock. OCLC – 750947240 .
- The Churchman (1929). "The Church and the State." p. 240 London, England: The Church Society. Retrieved: 28 March 2015.
- The Churchman (1935). Review of: "The Evangelical Church Catholic". London, England: The Church Society, Eliot Stock. Vol. 49 p. 145 OCLC – 750947240 Retrieved: 28 March 2015.
- de S. Cameron, Nigel M.; Wright, David F.; Lachman, David C.; Meek, Donald E., eds. (1993). Dictionary of Scottish Church History & Theology. Edinburgh: T & T Clark. p. 774. OCLC 46919752.
- "Free Church of Scotland". Encyclopædia Britannica.
- "Presbyterianism". Encyclopædia Britannica.
- "Presbyterian". Encyclopædia Britannica.
- "Free Church Federal Council". Encyclopædia Britannica.
- Evangelical Free Churches (1921). The Free Churches and the Lambeth Appeal: being the report of a committee appointed by the Federal Council of the Evangelical Free Churches of England and the National Free Church Council. London: RTS. The National Council of the Evangelical Free Churches in England and Wales.
- Feinberg, Charles, L. (1936). Review of: "The Fact of the Christian Church". Bibliotheca Sacra. Vol. BSAC 093:369
- Hastings, Adrian (1986). A History of English Christianity, 1920–1985. London: Collins.
- Hay Colligan, J. (1938). "The Reverend Professor Patrick Carnegie Simpson, M.A. D.D.". Journal of the Presbyterian Historical Society of England. VI (3).
- Healey, F. G. (1961). Rooted in Faith: Three Centuries of Nonconformity, 1662–1962. Independent Press.
- Healey, F. G. (1972). "Patrick Carnegie Simpson. A Man of Style 1865 – 1947". Journal of the Presbyterian Historical Society of England. XIV (5).
- Horsham, Australia: The Historical Record of the Horsham Presbyterian Church. (1858–1908) p. 11
- Hough, L. H. (1962). "The World Ecumenical Conferences". Christian Century Reader. Ed. Fey and Frakes. New York: Association Press. The Christian Century Foundation: 155.
- Hunter, T. W. (1902). Review of: "Love never faileth". The Chicago Daily Tribune. 28 June 1902.
- Ives, K. "Keith's Histories Personalities, biographies, events from Church History for reflection and understanding". Keith's histories.
- A Kempis, Thomae (1892). "De Imitatione ( 11. VI. 3.) De laetitia bonae conscientiae". De Imitatione Christi: Libre Quatuor [Of the imitation of Christ: Four Books] (in Latin and English).
- Lumsden, C, C. (2012). Class, Gender and Christianity In Edinburgh 1850 – 1905: A Study in Denominationalism (PDF) (PhD thesis). Edinburgh University.
- MacLeod, J. L. (2000). The Second Disruption: The Free Church in Victorian Scotland and the Origins of the Free Presbyterian Church. East Linton, Scotland: Tuckwell Press. OCLC 46919752.
- Martel, J. D. The prayer book controversy 1927 – 1928 (PDF) (MA thesis). Durham University.
- Mathews, Shailer (1901). "Review of: 'The Fact of Christ.'" The Biblical World, Vol. 18. University Press of Chicago. Retrieved: 11 March 2015.
- Morgan, D. Densil (2010). Barth Reception in Britain. London: T. and T. Clark International. p. 312. ISBN 9780567031860.
- National Archives. Churches of Scotland Act (1905).
- Parliamentary Debates (Official Report). 69H. 5s, columns 972–973. Quoted in Martel, J.D.
- Radio Times. Schedules 1923 – 2009. BBC
- Rainy, Robert (July–December 1904). "The Scottish Church Crisis – an interview". The Review of Reviews. Vol. 30. pp. 591–593.
- Renfield Church – 150th Anniversary Celebrations. St John's-Renfield Church 1819 – 1969. Glasgow and Edinburgh: Pillans and Wilson. p. 25
- Sinclair and Mackay (1999). "Jubilee History of St Andrew's Presbyterian Church of Carlton". Quodlibet. 1 (8).
- Smithen, F. J. S. (1930). "The Church and the State – A review". Journal of Presbyterian Historical Society of England. IV (3): 182–184.
- "Parliament and the Prayer Book". The Spectator Archive: 4. 29 October 1927.
- "Parliament and the Prayer Book". The Spectator Archive: 4. 24 December 1927.
- "Religion and Freedom". The Spectator Archive: 18. 22 November 1935.
- "The Church and the State Report". The Spectator Archive: 8. 7 February 1936.
- St James Gazette. 25 October 1904.
- Swanton, Robert (1971). "Patrick Carnegie Simpson". The Reformed Theological Review. 30 (2).
- The Times (1947). Obituary. London: 23 December 1947.
- Smithen, F. J. (1948). "Church Historian and Teacher". Journal of the Presbyterian Historical Society of England. IX (1).
- The Tablet, (1901). Review of: "The Fact of Christ". 15 June 1901.
- Vidler, A. R. (1971). The Church in an Age of Revolution: 1789 to the Present Day. Harmondsworth: Penguin Books. OCLC 140332.
- Ward, R.; Prentis, M. (2003). Presbyterian Ministers in Australia 1822–1901: Biographical register. New Melbourne Press.
- Whitehorn, R. D. (1948). "Dr Carnegie Simpson and the Lambeth Conversations". Journal of Presbyterian Historical Society of England. IX (1).
- "Who's Who in Australia 1921–1950". Herald & Weekly Times Limited. Retrieved: 19 January 2015.
