= John Struthers =

John Struthers may refer to:

- John Struthers (anatomist) (1823–1899), Professor of Anatomy at the University of Aberdeen, Scotland
- John Struthers (poet) (1776–1853), Scottish poet and writer
- J. P. Struthers (1851–1915), Scottish preacher, pastor and children's author
