= Church of England Newspaper =

The Church of England Newspaper was an independent Anglican fortnightly newspaper. Based in London, it was published on Fridays.

The Church of England Newspaper is notable as the earliest church paper, and by the time of its demise it was one of the oldest newspapers still in circulation. It is independent of the Church of England hierarchy. It normally adopts a broadly evangelical stance, as opposed to the historically Anglo-Catholic-leaning Church Times.

The Church of England Newspaper only had that name from 1949, as it amalgamated with other publications over the years. It was founded in 1828 as The Record, and continued under that title until 31 December 1948. At that point it merged with Church Family Newspaper, which itself was first issued on 8 February 1894. The British Weekly: a journal of social and Christian progress was, from not long after its founding in 1886, "one of the most successful religious newspapers of its time" and "a major voice of the 'Nonconformist Conscience' in late Victorian Britain". The author of Voices of Nonconformity: William Robertson Nicoll and the British Weekly (2011) asserts that that newspaper "acquired the Christian World in the 1960s, but in the 1970s, it passed into the ownership of the Christian Weekly Newspapers, the publishers of the Church of England Newspaper."

The paper was owned by the Conservative politician John Cordle from 1946.

In July 2025, the paper ceased publication.
