= Nonconformist conscience =

UK political alliance, 1880s-1910s

The Nonconformist conscience was the moralistic influence of the Nonconformist churches in British politics in the 19th and early 20th centuries. Nonconformists, who were dissenters from the Church of England, believed in the autonomy of their churches and fought for religious freedom, social justice, and strong moral values in public life.

== Moral outlook ==
Historians group together certain historic Protestant groups in England as "Nonconformists" or "Dissenters" standing in opposition to the established Church of England. In the 19th century the Dissenters who went to chapel comprised half the people who actually attended services on Sunday. They were based in the fast-growing urban middle class. The Nonconformist conscience was their moral sensibility which they tried to implement in British politics. The two categories of Dissenters, or Nonconformists, were in addition to the evangelicals or "Low Church" element in the Church of England. "Old Dissenters," dating from the 16th and 17th centuries, included Baptists, Congregationalists, Quakers, Unitarians, and Presbyterians outside Scotland. "New Dissenters" emerged in the 18th century, and were mainly Methodists.

The Nonconformist conscience of the Old group emphasized religious liberty and equality; pursuit of justice; and opposition to discrimination, compulsion, and coercion. The New Dissenters (and also the Anglican evangelicals) stressed personal morality issues, including sexuality, temperance, family values, and Sabbath-keeping. Both factions were politically active, but until mid-19th century the Old group supported mostly Whigs and Liberals in politics, while the New – like most Anglicans – generally supported Conservatives. In the late 19th century, the New Dissenters mostly switched to the Liberal Party. The result was a merging of the two groups, strengthening their great weight as a political pressure group. They joined together on new issues especially regarding schools and temperance, with the latter of special interest to Methodists.

By 1914 the linkage was weakening and by the 1920s it was virtually dead.

== History ==
1929 The British Weekly edited by John A Hutton

The phrase gained wide currency during the campaign by the Welsh Methodist Hugh Price Hughes against the participation in politics of the divorcee Sir Charles Dilke (1886) and the adulterer Charles Stewart Parnell (1890), believing that political leaders should possess high moral integrity. In Britain one strong base of Liberal Party support was Nonconformist Protestantism, such as the Methodists and Presbyterians. The nonconformist conscience rebelled against having an adulterer (Parnell) play a major role in the Liberal Party. The Liberal party leader William Gladstone warned that if Parnell retained his powerful role the leadership, it would mean the loss of the next election, the end of their alliance and also of the Irish Home Rule movement.

The Nonconformist conscience was shaped and promoted to a large decree by The British Weekly: a journal of social and Christian progress, according to the Dictionary of Nineteenth-century Journalism in Great Britain and Ireland. It was one of the most successful religious newspapers of the late nineteenth and early twentieth centuries, founded and nominally edited by William Robertson Nicoll till his death in 1923, but in fact mostly led by his assistant Jane T. Stoddart.

The high point of the Nonconformist conscience came with opposition to the Education Act 1902, in which Nonconformist voluntary schools were taken over by state authorities. Élie Halévy wrote that: "Thoroughout the Nonconformist and Radical ranks frenzied excitement prevailed. To read the Liberal newspapers of the day you would imagine that the Cecils were preparing to revive the policy of Laud if not of Strafford, and that in every village a Nonconformist Hampden was about to rise against their persecution".

By 1914 the Nonconformist conscience was in decline, and during the First World War ecumenism gained popularity. By 1938 David Lloyd George remarked that these changes had killed off the influence of the Nonconformist conscience.

In the middle of the Second World War, the United Reformed minister and theologian Harry Francis Lovell Cocks published The Nonconformist Conscience (1943) in which he declared that the movement "is the mark of a spiritual aristocracy, a counterblast to coronets and mitres".

== See also ==
- Forward Movement
- Social Gospel
