= Maurice Nicoll =

Scottish psychiatrist, author (1884–1953)

- Nicoll in 1953
- Born: Henry Maurice Dunlop Nicoll; 19 July 1884; Kelso, Scotland
- Died: 30 August 1953 (aged 69); Great Amwell, England
- Occupations: Neurologist, psychiatrist, author, and esoteric teacher
- Spouse: Catherine Champion-Jones
- Relatives: William Robertson Nicoll (father)
- Writing career
- Pen name: Martin Swayne
- Subjects: Fourth Way, C.G. Jung, Dream Interpretation, G.I. Gurdjieff, P.D. Ouspensky, Esotericism, Esoteric Christianity, Emanuel Swedenborg,
- Notable works: Psychological Commentaries on the Teaching of Gurdjieff and Ouspensky, The New Man, Some Interpretations of the Parables and Miracles of Christ, Living Time and the Integration of the Life, The Mark, Dream Psychology, The Blue Germ

Henry Maurice Dunlop Nicoll (19 July 1884 – 30 August 1953) was a Scottish neurologist, psychiatrist, author and noted Fourth Way esoteric teacher. He is best known for his Psychological Commentaries on the Teaching of Gurdjieff and Ouspensky, a five-volume collection of more than 500 talks given and distributed to his study groups in and around London from March 1941 to August 1953.

== Life and work ==
Nicoll was born at the manse in Kelso, Scotland, the son of William Robertson Nicoll, a minister of the Free Church of Scotland and renowned man of letters. From 1903 to 1906 Nicoll studied science at Gonville and Caius College, Cambridge, earning First Class Honours in the Natural Science Tripos. From 1906 to 1910 he attended St Bartholomew's Hospital qualifying in medicine as a surgeon and neurologist. He served as ship's-surgeon for a brief stint to and from Buenos Aires before proceeding to tour the European hotbeds of the New Psychology, Vienna, Berlin, and finally, Zürich, where he met and became a close friend and colleague of C.G. Jung in 1912.

Jung legitimised Nicoll's belief in the mind-body dynamic by curing him of a stammer. Nicoll spent the next decade with his father-figure even making Jung godfather of his only child, Jane, in 1921.

In 1917 Nicoll published his first non-fiction monograph, Dream Psychology, the "First didactic presentation of Jung's psychology," according to the Jungian scholar Sonu Shamdasani.

In addition to his personal friendship with Jung, from 1912 through 1921 Nicoll published a number of articles on Jung's theories in professional journals, so it would not have been out of character for Nicoll to have served as a Jungian proxy at his Harley Street, London, medical practice. Following his service as a captain in the Royal Army Medical Corps during the First World War, where he first treated the wounded at the Gallipoli, Suvla Bay offensive, and after recovering from dysentery, he arrived with the 32nd Field Hospital of the 10th Irish division and did the same at the Siege of Kut, in Mesopotamia.

In October 1921 he met P. D. Ouspensky, a student and then a teacher of George Gurdjieff's Fourth Way. Despite the recent birth of his only child, Jane, the following spring Nicoll sold his Harley Street medical practice within a month after meeting the “Tiger of Turkestan” (Gurdjieff’s nickname), and by that fall he, his wife Catherine, Jane, and the child's nanny arrived at the Institute for the Harmonious Development of Man outside Paris. In the summer of 1923, when Gurdjieff closed down his institute, Nicoll joined Ouspensky's group. In 1931 he followed Ouspensky's advice and started his own study groups in England. Many of these talks were recorded verbatim and documented in a six-volume series of texts compiled in his book series Psychological Commentaries on the Teaching of Gurdjieff and Ouspensky.

Nicoll is best known as a teacher and practitioner of the Fourth Way or esoteric Christianity of Gurdjieff and Ouspensky, but as his authorised biographer Beryl Pogson notes he privately read Swedenborg and the Gospels. In fact, his synthesis of the aforementioned esoteric Christianity with the New Christianity as especially expounded by Swedenborg in his multi-volume exegetical work Arcana Coelestia resulted in what could be described as a mystical Christianity unique to the Fourth Way tradition if not all of Christian mysticism.

His early tutelage under Jung led to a lifelong interest in and self-application of dream interpretation. His associated reflections on Neoplatonism, Gnosticism, Hermeticism, Alchemy, Sufism, Greek philosophy, Jakob Böhme, William Blake, along with variety of Indian and Chinese traditions (not to mention an assortment of individuals throughout history who have commented on consciousness) are as a whole present in Living Time and the Integration of the Life (completed by WWII but not published until 1952); yet both his published works and private papers have for the most part been publicly commented upon only infrequently.

== Bibliography ==
=== Books ===
- Dream Psychology, 1917, 2nd, 1919
- Psychological Commentaries on the Teaching of Gurdjieff and Ouspensky
  - Volumes 1-3 privately printed, 1949, then Vincent Stuart Ltd., 1952
  - Volume 4, Vincent Stuart Ltd., 1955
  - Volume 5, Vincent Stuart Ltd., 1956
  - Samuel Weiser Inc., 1996, (5 volumes with additional index volume)
- The New Man : An Interpretation of Some Parables and Miracles of Christ, 1950
  - First American edition, 1951
  - Penguin, 1972
  - Watkins, 1981
  - Shambhala, 1984
  - Eureka Editions, 1999
- Living Time and the Integration of the Life, 1952
  - Watkins, 1976
  - Eureka Editions, 1998
- The Mark, posthumous, 1954, 1955
  - Watkins, 1981
  - Shambhala, 1981
  - Eureka Editions, 1998
- Simple Explanation of Work Ideas, privately printed, 1968
  - Eureka Editions, 1999
- Notes Taken at Meetings, January 18, 1934 to April 8, 1934, Eureka Editions, 1996
- Selections from Meetings in 1953 at Great Amwell, Eureka Editions, 1997
- Informal Work Talks and Teachings: 1940-1950, Eureka Editions, 1998

=== Poetry ===
- Poems, privately printed, 1956

=== Professional articles ===
- "Why Is The 'Unconscious' Unconscious?", 1918, The British Journal of Psychology, Volume 9, Number 2
- "Neurosis of War", 1920, The Medical Annual

=== Using the pen-name "Martin Luttrell Swayne" ===
==== Novels and novellas ====
- The Sporting Instinct, Hodder & Stoughton, 1910
- Lord Richard in the Pantry, Methuen & Company, 1911
- Cupid Goes North, Hodder & Stoughton, 1913
- In Mesopotamia, Hodder & Stoughton, 1918
- The Blue Germ, Hodder & Stoughton, 1918

==== Unpublished novel ====
- Pelican Hotel, unpublished, 1939

==== Short-stories ====
- "A Game of Consequences", London Magazine, October 1911
- "The Black and Gold Curtain", London Magazine, April 1912
- "The Mystery of the 'Vathek'", Pall Mall Magazine, 94-104, January 1913
- "Life-Like", The Strand Magazine, 206–13, February 1913
- "Life-Like", "The Times’ Red Cross Story Book by Famous Novelists Serving in His Majesty's Forces", 74–82
- "The Piano-tuner", London Magazine, 73–79, April 1913
- "Sir Clifford's Gorilla", The Strand Magazine, 24–31, July 1913
- "The Alabaster Jar", The Strand Magazine, 212–20, August 1913
- "The Flying Log", London Magazine, November 1913
- "The Corot Landscape", The Strand Magazine, 516–23, November 1913
- "Half a Ton of Dynamite", The Strand Magazine, 18–27, January 1916
- "The Sleep-Beam", The Strand Magazine, 187–93, March 1918
- "The Whistling", Lloyd's Magazine, October 1918
- "An Awkward Situation", The Strand Magazine, 83–91, July 1924
- "A Sense of the Future", The Strand Magazine, 174–84, August 1924
- "An Obvious Case", The Strand Magazine, 405–13, October 1924

==== Plays ====
- "One Good Turn", with Eille Norwood, 1912
- "Lord Richard in the Pantry, A Play in Three Acts", adapted from the novel by Martin Swayne, 1918

==== Biographies of Nicoll ====
- Maurice Nicoll: A Portrait, Beryl Pogson, 1961
  - Fourth Way Books, 1987
- The Diary of a Modern Alchemist: Working with Dr. Maurice Nicoll, John H. Reyner, 1974
  - Eureka Editions, 2014
- Portrait of a Vertical Man: An Appreciation of Doctor Maurice Nicoll and His Work, Samuel Copley, 1989
- Maurice Nicoll: Forgotten Teacher of the Fourth Way, Gary Lachman, 2024

==== Biographical material about Nicoll ====
- A Few Recollections of Dr Nicoll and of Amwell 1949-1953, Diana Pettavel, 1999
