= Jane T. Stoddart =

Jane Stoddart
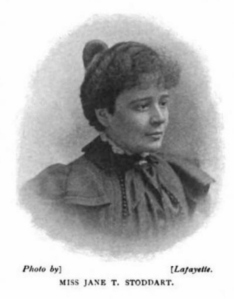
- by "Lafayette"
- Born: 2 November 1863; Kelso, Scotland
- Died: 15 December 1944 (aged 81); Edinburgh, Scotland
- Occupations: writer, translator, de facto editor
- Employer: Hodder & Stoughton
- Known for: writing

Jane Thompson Stoddart (2 November 1863 – 15 December 1944) was a Scottish journalist and author and de facto editor of The British Weekly, "a central force in shaping and promoting the 'Nonconformist conscience'".

== Life ==
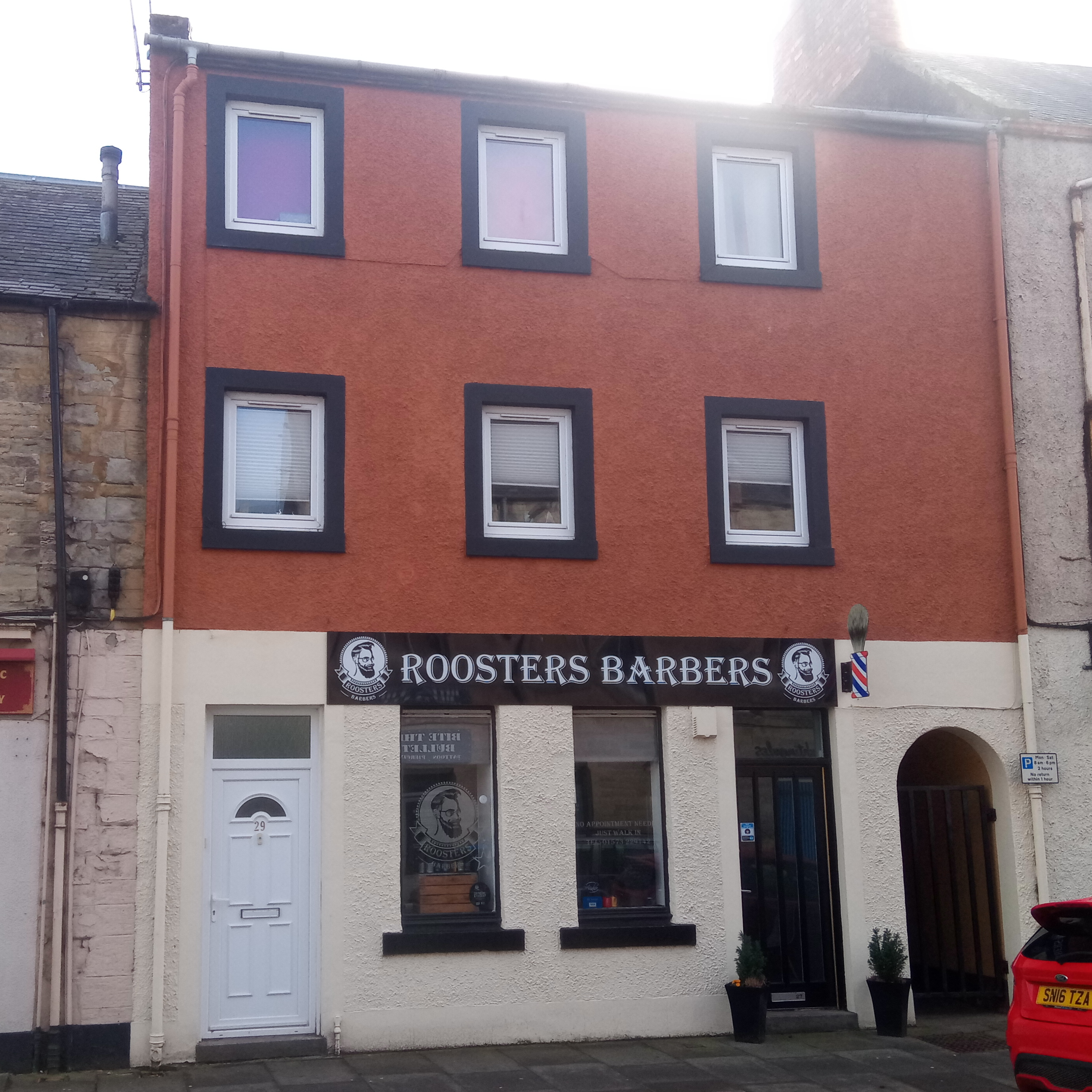
29 Horsemarket in Kelso where Jane Stoddart was born

Stoddart was born in Kelso in the Scottish Borders in 1863. Her parents were Margaret (born Galloway) and William Stoddart. Her father worked as an assistant to Horatius Bonar. At the age of thirteen she met Reverend William Robertson Nicoll who had just moved to Kelso from Banffshire to be the new minister. Nicoll was to become her mentor. Meanwhile, she went from school in Kelso where she learned to teach in the part of southern Edinburgh known as Bruntsfield.

1886 was her first year of having a book published. The story of A Door of Hope was described in reviews as "thoroughly healthy" and the reviewers included local papers, Home and School in Toronto and the Presbyterian Messenger said it was a "Marvellous Book". In 1877, she wrote her last work of fiction titled In Cheviots Glens. In 1881, she went to Hanover to learn more German, returning to Britain in 1883 to teach in Clifton. Using her knowledge of German she translated Still Hours in 1886 by Richard Rothe who was a Lutheran theologian who had died in 1867.

In 1890, she left her teaching job. She had been working with William Robertson Nicoll on a project, but she was now employed as his assistant.

The British Weekly in 1929 nominally edited by John A Hutton

In 1894, she published her second translation which was Ruysbroeck and the mystics, with selections from Ruysbroeck, by the Nobel Laureate Maurice Maeterlinck. She was still Nicoll's assistant as his wife died and he remarried. She would write about this in her autobiography which doesn't mention a romance with anyone. They did work together. Both Nicoll and Stoddart were opposed to the idea of referendums. In 1910, she was the prime author of a pamphlet on the subject before the election in 1910. It sold a large number of copies.

In 1923, her mentor died and she would continue to lead on his publication The British Weekly. Formally J. M. E. Ross and later John A Hutton had the job title of editor but she frequently did their job as the de facto editor.

Stoddart retired in 1937 and she published her autobiography Harvest of the Years in the following year. She died in Edinburgh in 1944.

== Works include ==
- A Door of Hope, 1876
- In Cheviots Glens, 1877.
- (translation) Ruysbroeck and the Mystics, with selections from Ruysbroeck, 1894, by Maurice Maeterlinck
- (translation) Still Hours, 1886, by Richard Rothe
- The girlhood of Mary queen of Scots from her landing in France in August 1548 to her departure from France in August 1561, 1908
- The Life of the Empress Eugenie, 1906
- The New Socialism, an Impartial Inquiry, 1909
- Against the Referendum, 1910, also by W. Robertson Nicoll
- The Expositor's Dictionary of Texts, containing Outlines, Expositions and Illustrations of Bible Texts, with full references to the best homiletic literature, 1911, also by W. Robertson Nicoll and James Moffatt
- The New Testament in Life and Literature, 1914
- The Case Against Spiritualism, 1919
- The Christian Year in Human Story, 1920
- My Harvest of the Years, autobiography, 1938
