= Trinity College, Glasgow =

College at the University of Glasgow, Scotland

Trinity College
- Type: Theological college
- Established: 1856
- Affiliations: Faculty of Divinity, University of Glasgow
- Religious affiliation: Church of Scotland
- Principal: Doug Gay
- Location: Glasgow, Scotland; 55.872°N 4.288°W
Colours
- Website: Trinity College

Trinity College, Glasgow, Scotland, is the Church of Scotland's College at the University of Glasgow. It provides special supervision of candidates for the ministry through a Principal (appointed by the General Assembly of the Church of Scotland) and a College Council. The college is the official channel of liaison between the University of Glasgow, the Church of Scotland, and the United Free Church of Scotland.

The current principal is Doug Gay.

== History ==
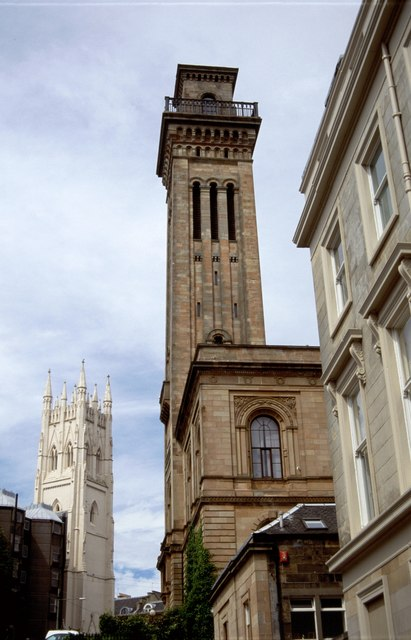
Former Trinity College, Glasgow

The Disruption of 1843 marked a schism in the Church of Scotland, resulting in the creation of the Free Church of Scotland. The Free Church established three colleges or seminaries of its own, detached from the universities, for the education of its ministers. As well as its Glasgow college, the other two colleges were New College, Edinburgh and Christ's College, Aberdeen.

The Glasgow College, funded by local subscription, was established in 1856. It was a multi-disciplinary institution of considerable reputation, existing outside the University of Glasgow's Faculty of Divinity. In 1872 Thomas Martin Lindsay was appointed Professor of church history, and he became principal of the college in 1902.

Later, in 1930, following the reunion of the churches and theological teaching facilities, the Glasgow Church college was renamed "Trinity College". After the reunion of the main Scottish Presbyterian churches in 1929–30, the two teaching facilities in the university and the Church College were reintegrated. After 1976, when the Church-owned Trinity College buildings at Park Circus were finally vacated, all teaching of theology took place in the university Divinity Faculty. Accordingly, while Trinity College still exists, it is a body without walls.

On 2 November 2006, Trinity College celebrated its 150th anniversary with a gathering of some 250 alumni and friends. Its 155th anniversary celebrations took place on 4 November 2011.

== Notable faculty ==
Teachers in the pre-1930 College included Alexander Balmain Bruce, James Denney, George Adam Smith, James Moffatt, Henry Drummond, and James Orr. In the modern era, in the reunited faculty, notable teachers have included John MacQuarrie, William H.C. Frend, William Barclay, John Zizioulas, Robert Davidson George Newlands, John Riches, Heather Walton (theologian) Charlotte Methuen (Church Historian) . The former clerk was A. K. M. Adam. The current clerk is Mark Johnston.

== Archives ==
The archives of Trinity College are maintained by the University of Glasgow Archives Services.
