= James Denney =

Scottish theologian and preacher

James Denney (8 February 1856 – 12 June 1917) was a Scottish theologian and preacher. He is probably best known today for his theological articulation of the meaning of the atonement within Christian theology, atonement for him being “the most profound of all truths”. Many have misunderstood his position, arguing that he was known for his defense of the doctrine of penal substitution. However, Denney himself protested vigorously against this characterization.

== Early life ==
Denney was born in Paisley, Scotland, 5 February 1856, to Cameronian (Reformed Presbyterian) parents. His father was a joiner and Cameronian deacon. In 1876 the family followed the majority of the Reformed Presbyterian Church of Scotland into union with the Free Church of Scotland.

He was educated at the Highlanders' Academy, Greenock, University of Glasgow, from 1874 to 1879 and then at Free Church College, Glasgow until 1883. He won the Moral Philosophy gold medal and Blackstone Prize while at Glasgow University. He was influenced greatly by Edward Caird and Richard Jebb and briefly became a student assistant to John Veitch.

Denney was an outstanding student at Free Church College, where he studied under Dr. George C.M. Douglas (Old Testament), Dr. T.M. Lindsay (Church History), Dr. James Candlish (Systematic Theology) and Dr Alexander Balmain Bruce (New Testament). Denney was greatly influenced by Professor Bruce in particular, adopting his system of apologetics. Denney said that Professor Bruce "let me see Jesus" rather than cluttering his lectures with abstruse points.

While still a student Denney published his first work, Natural Law in the Spiritual World, by a Brother of the Natural Man. It was a trenchantly critical review of Henry Drummond's Natural Law in the Spiritual World.

== Ministry ==
After university he turned to the Ministry. Denney was licensed to preach by the Presbytery of Greenock on 16 May 1883 and was appointed Missioner to the Hill Street Mission of St. John's (Free Church), Glasgow. In 1886, he was called to be pastor of the East Free Church, Broughty Ferry, where he succeeded his friend and mentor Professor Bruce. At Broughty Ferry Denney was a popular preacher who preached the Gospel to the common people. He married May Carmichael Brown on 1 July 1886. Their marriage was a happy one. According to William Robertson Nicoll, Denney, previously tempted away from the Evangelical and Reformed faith of his parents, was influenced to return in that direction by his wife's encouraging him to read sermons by C.H. Spurgeon.

Some of his expository sermons preached at Broughty Ferry were published in two volumes of The Expositor's Bible, edited by W. Robertson Nicoll, The Epistles to the Thessalonians in 1892 and The Second Epistle to the Corinthians in 1894. (Amusingly, some copies of the commentary on the First Epistle to the Corinthians in a later edition of The Expositor's Bible have Denney's name on the covers. The book was in fact written, as the title page makes clear, by Marcus Dods).

In 1893 Denney was asked to deliver a series of theological lectures at Chicago Theological Seminary. These were published in 1894 under the title Studies in Theology. Some of his statements on the nature of the Bible were objected to, but otherwise the book was recognised as an important work. Denney was also awarded the degree of Doctor of Divinity by the University of Chicago.

== Academic career ==
Denney was appointed Professor of Systematic Theology at his old alma mater, Free Church College Glasgow, in 1897, and spent the rest of his life teaching there. In 1900 he transferred to Professor Bruce's old Chair of New Testament Language and Literature, which he held until his death in 1917. In 1915 he was appointed principal of the college, the first former student of the institution to receive that honour. Denney became a close friend of the one-time Free Church minister and journalist Sir William Robertson Nicoll, to whose publications he contributed liberally dozens of articles. His wife died in 1907 and Denney felt the loss deeply, from which he never recovered, writing only two major works before his death in the summer of 1917 at the comparatively early age of 61.

== Theological position ==
Denney's greatest contribution to theological literature is in his unfailing confidence in the power of the gospel best articulated in the words, "Christ died for the ungodly." Many today misunderstand his theological position as defending the penal character of the atonement, but this is not the case: First expressed in his Studies in Theology, his position on the meaning of the Atonement found its fullest expression in his 1902 work The Death of Christ (London, Hodder and Stoughton, often reprinted), and its follow-up (in later editions included as an appendix in The Death of Christ), The Atonement and the Modern Mind. “Few things have astonished me more,” he exclaims, “than to be charged with teaching a ‘forensic’ or ‘legal’ or ‘judicial’ doctrine of Atonement... There is nothing which I should wish to reprobate more whole-heartedly than the conception which is expressed by these words. To say that the relations of God and man are forensic is to say that they are regulated by statute... that the sinner is a criminal--and that God adjudicates on him by interpreting the statute in its application to his case. Everybody knows that this is a travesty of the truth” (The Death of Christ, 271-272) . Denney proceeds to elaborate on the relations between God and man as personal (not legal) and must be "determined in way which has universal and moral validity." If rational and moral they must be “relations... determined by law...But law in this sense is not 'legal.' It is not 'judicial,' or 'forensic,' or 'statutory.' None the less it is real and vital, and the whole moral value of the relation depends upon it" (The Death of Christ, 273). Denney argues that Paul did not preach the gospel "by extending to all mankind a Pharisaic, legal, forensic relation to God; he did it by rising above such conceptions...to the conception of a relation of all of men to God expressing itself in a moral constitution--or, as he would have said it, but in an entirely unforensic sense, in a law--of divine and unchanging validity. The maintenance of this law, or of this moral constitution, in its inviolable integrity was the signature of the forgiveness Paul preached" (The Death of Christ, 274-275).

In his last book, published posthumously, The Christian Doctrine of Reconciliation, Denney returned to the doctrine of the atonement, but some reviewers felt he had modified his previous views, presenting a '"mellow" utterance on the great theme'.

== Writings ==
In addition to his academic oeuvre, he made dozens of contributions to journals and newspapers ranging from erudite theological journals to The Morning Watch, a Sunday-school magazine edited by his friend J. P. Struthers.

Denney wrote other major works. As well as those already mentioned he contributed a commentary on the Greek Text of Romans to The Expositor's Greek Testament (edited by W. R. Nicoll, 1900). His Jesus and the Gospel (London, Hodder and Stoughton, 1908) is a careful piece of theological writing demonstrating that there is no disparity between Jesus' own teaching about himself as recorded in the Gospels and the view of Jesus exhibited in the New Testament Epistles. Several of his sermons were published in 1913 under the title The Way Everlasting (London, Hodder and Stoughton).

== Sources ==
- James M. Gordon, James Denney (Milton Keynes, Paternoster, 2006)
- Stuart Mechie, Trinity College, Glasgow (Glasgow, Trinity College, 1956)
- James Moffatt (editor), Letters of Principal James Denney to his Family and Friends (London, Hodder and Stoughton, no date)
- William Robertson Nicoll (editor), Letters of Principal James Denney to W. Robertson Nicoll (London, Hodder and Stoughton, no date)
- T. H. Walker, Principal James Denney, D.D. (London, Marshall Brothers, 1918)
- James Denney, The Death of Christ (London, Hodder and Stoughton, 1911)
- James Denney, The Death of Christ (Forgotten Books, July 12, 2012)
