= Manor Church Centre, Egremont =

Coordinates: 53.4238°N 3.0326°W

Manor Church Centre
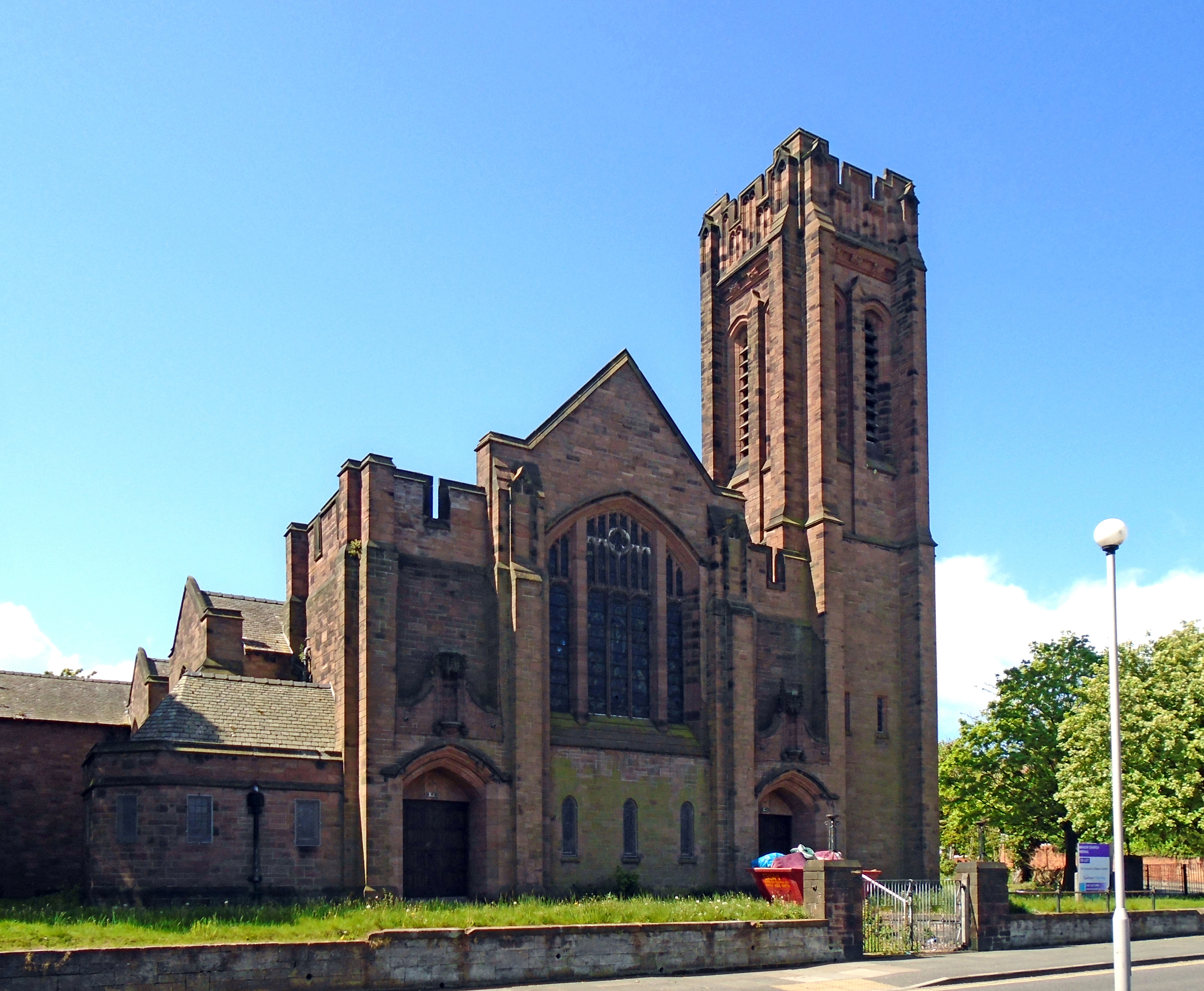
- Liturgical west end of the Manor Church Centre

- Location in Merseyside
- Location: Seabank Road, Egremont, Merseyside
- Country: England
- Denomination: Presbyterian Church of England (later United Reformed Church and Methodist Church of Great Britain)

Architecture
- Functional status: Closed
- Heritage designation: Grade II
- Designated: 20 January 1988
- Architect(s): Briggs, Wolstenholme & Thornely
- Architectural type: Church and church hall
- Style: Arts and Crafts and Gothic Revival
- Groundbreaking: 1907
- Completed: 1908
- Construction cost: £19,000
- Closed: c. 2011

Specifications
- Capacity: 1,000
- Materials: Sandstone, slate roof

The Manor Church Centre was a combined church and church hall on Seabank Road, Egremont, Merseyside, England. It was built in 1907–08 as Egremont Presbyterian Church, later became Egremont United Reformed Church, and in 1994 joined with a local Methodist church to become the Manor Church Centre.

The church was designed by Briggs, Wolstenholme & Thornely. It is constructed in sandstone and is in a mixture of Arts and Crafts and Gothic Revival styles. The church is notable for the stained glass in its windows. The church and hall are recorded in the National Heritage List for England as a designated Grade II listed building. The church closed c. 2011.

== History ==
The building originated as Egremont Presbyterian Church in Wallasey on the Wirral. In 1862–63 the local Presbyterians built their first church in King Street. It was in Neoclassical style and could accommodate a congregation of 600. At the beginning of the 20th century it was decided to build the present church, which is larger and on a different site. This was designed by Briggs, Wolstenholme & Thornely, who later built Wallasey Town Hall. The foundation stone was laid by Lord Balfour of Burleigh on 18 April 1907. The church cost £19,000, it can accommodate 1,000 people, and it opened for worship in 1908. The church hall was added in 1910.

In 1972 the Presbyterian Church of England and the Congregational Church in England and Wales joined to form the United Reformed Church, and the church became Egremont United Reformed Church. In 1994 it united with Trinity Methodist Church and became the Manor Church Centre. In 2010 the congregation joined St Andrew's United Church in New Brighton and the Manor Church Centre was closed. The communion table and war memorials were transferred to St Andrew's.

== Architecture ==
=== Exterior ===
The church centre consists of a church and an attached church hall. (Note: The church is orientated with the liturgical east end at the west. In this article the liturgical orientation is used in the description.) The church is constructed in red sandstone from Runcorn, and its roof is slated. Its architectural style is a mixture of Arts and Crafts and Gothic Revival. The plan consists of a nave with north and south passage (narrow) aisles, a north transept, a short chancel, and a southwest tower. The hall is at right angles to the church. The tower has angle buttresses, and pairs of louvred bell openings. At the top is a cornice carved with foliage and beasts, and a panelled and embattled parapet. The tower is 60 feet (18 m) high. At the (liturgical) west end are three lancet windows with a five-light window above containing Perpendicular tracery. Flanking the windows are bays, each containing a gabled porch with niches above and, at the top, an embattled parapet. On the south side of the church are three projecting gabled bays and two bays between them. On the north side are two projecting bays with one bay between, and a two-bay transept. Each bay contains a three-light window. The east window has five lights. Attached to the church beyond the transept is a chapel keeper's house. The church hall is in Tudor style. It has four bays, and contains mullioned and transomed windows.

=== Interior ===
The interior is spacious and provides uninterrupted views for the congregation. The five-bay arcades are carried on octagonal piers. The church has a hammerbeam roof with corbels decorated with foliage. There is a west gallery. The pulpit is octagonal and contains figures in niches. The font is carried on four green columns, and is decorated with traceried panels.

The stained glass in the east window depicts the Empty Tomb, and is by H. G. Hiller. In the transept is a window of 1908 designed by William Aikman and made by Powell's depicting The Sower. Also on the north side is a window by Wilhelmina Geddes, dated 1934, and a window by Gilbert Gamon depicting Faith, Hope and Charity. On the south side are two windows made for the Artificers' Guild, one designed by John H. Bonnor, and the other by Edward Woore. Between these, and elsewhere in the church, are windows by Morris & Co. The west window contains glass designed by Percy Bacon.

== Appraisal ==
The church and church hall were designated as a Grade II listed building on 20 January 1988. Grade II is the lowest of the three grades of listing and is applied to "buildings of national importance and special interest". When the church was completed in 1908, it was the largest Presbyterian church in England. Hartwell et al. describe the stained glass in the windows as being "outstanding".

== See also ==
- Listed buildings in Wallasey
- Patrick Carnegie Simpson, minister

== Notes and references ==
Notes

Citations

Sources

- Hartwell, Clare; Hyde, Matthew; Hubbard, Edward; Pevsner, Nikolaus (2011) [1971], Cheshire, The Buildings of England, New Haven and London: Yale University Press, ISBN 978-0-300-17043-6
- Historic England, "Manor Church Centre (1258397)", National Heritage List for England
- Historic England, Listed Buildings
- History of Wallasey, History of Wallasey Churches:Egremont
