= British Weekly =

British newspaper

A 1929 British Weekly edited by John A Hutton

The British Weekly: A Journal of Social and Christian Progress was a significant publication from its founding in 1886 well into the 20th century. One of the most successful religious newspapers of its time, it was published by Hodder & Stoughton. It was "a central force in shaping and promoting the 'Nonconformist conscience'", according to the Dictionary of Nineteenth-century Journalism in Great Britain and Ireland.

== Foundation and influence ==
The founder and nominal editor was William Robertson Nicoll till his death in 1923, but the de facto editor was really his assistant Jane T. Stoddart. Her entry in the Dictionary of National Biography was prepared by the DNB's overall editor Colin Matthew, who wrote that she:

in 1890, became a full-time journalist, working as assistant editor on Nicoll's very successful paper, the British Weekly, the chief London nonconformist paper. Stoddart became the paper's main interviewer at a time when the interview was becoming a prominent feature of British weeklies; many of her interviews were published under the byline Lorna. In politics Stoddart was a strong Liberal Imperialist and quite influential on nonconformity in that respect.

The biography of Nicoll in the 1911 Encyclopedia Britannica describes his publication as "a Nonconformist organ which obtained great influence over opinion in the free churches", i.e. those Christian denominations which are neither the established church (the Church of England) nor the Roman Catholic church. Nicoll intended it to be the main vehicle for "liberal nonconformist opinion" and he succeeded in as much as the circulation numbers reached 100,000.

A 2011 book entitled Voices of Nonconformity: William Robertson Nicoll and the British Weekly from The Lutterworth Press sets out how Nicoll founded the paper in order to "introduce Nonconformist readers to the best in contemporary culture as well as promote a liberal political agenda". He followed stylistically in the footsteps of the Pall Mall Gazette, "including interviews of prominent personalities, use of line illustrations and photographs, special supplements, investigative reporting, sensationalist headlines, and serialised debates". Nicoll "gave expression to the moderate 'Nonconformist conscience', promoting religious equality and popular education." A review of this book in the Journal of Scottish Historical Studies describes the British Weekly as "one of the most successful religious newspapers of its time" and Nicoll as "a remarkable proponent of the 'New Journalism' and a major voice of the 'Nonconformist Conscience' in late Victorian Britain" (The phrase "New Journalism" had been coined by Matthew Arnold in 1887 to describe the sensational style of the Pall Mall Gazette and its muck-raking editor W. T. Stead.)

The biographer of Christian socialist and publisher Arthur Mee judges the British Weekly to have been the most influential of all of Britain's many religious newspapers.

== Aftermath ==
The author of the 2011 book asserts that "The British Weekly acquired the Christian World in the 1960s, but in the 1970s, it passed into the ownership of the Christian Weekly Newspapers, the publishers of the Church of England Newspaper." Another source mentions that its editorship moved from Edinburgh to London's Fleet Street in 1967, and in 1970 was sold. (Church of England newspaper 7 February 2014)
