= Journal of Scottish Historical Studies =

- Discipline: Scottish history
- Language: English
- Edited by: Professor Ewen Cameron and Dr Siobhan Talbott

Publication details
- Former names: Scottish Economic and Social History
- History: 1980–present
- Publisher: Edinburgh University Press on behalf of the Economic and Social History Society of Scotland (Scotland)
- Frequency: Bi-annual

Standard abbreviations
- ISO 4: J. Scott. Hist. Stud.

Indexing
- ISSN: 1748-538X (print); 1755-1749 (web)

Links
- Journal homepage; Online access

The Journal of Scottish Historical Studies is a bi-annual peer-reviewed academic journal published by Edinburgh University Press on behalf of the Economic and Social History Society of Scotland in May and November of each year. It was established in 1980 as Scottish Economic and Social History and took its current title in 2004. It covers research on the history of Scotland.
