= William Robertson Nicoll =

Scottish Free Church minister and writer

Sir William Robertson Nicoll CH
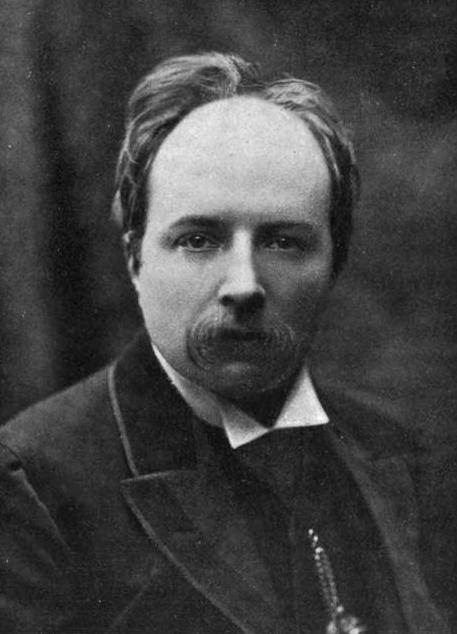
- Nicoll in Feb. 1895 edition of The Bookman (New York)
- Born: 10 October 1851; Lumsden, Aberdeenshire
- Died: 4 May 1923 (aged 71); Frognal, Hampstead, London
- Resting place: Highgate Cemetery
- Education: Aberdeen Grammar School; University of Aberdeen
- Occupations: Minister, journalist, editor, man of letters
- Spouse(s): Isabella Dunlop, Catherine Pollard
- Children: 3

Sir William Robertson Nicoll CH (10 October 1851 – 4 May 1923) was a Scottish Free Church minister, journalist, editor, and man of letters.

== Biography ==
Nicoll was born in Lumsden, Aberdeenshire, the son of Rev. Harry Nicoll (1812–1891), a Free Church minister of Auchindoir, and his wife, Jane Robertson.

He was educated at Aberdeen Grammar School and graduated MA at the University of Aberdeen in 1870, and studied for the ministry at the Free Church Divinity Hall there until 1874, when he was ordained minister of the Free Church at Dufftown, Banffshire. Three years later he moved to Kelso where he met Jane T. Stoddart. He was to be a great influence on her life. In 1884 became he editor of The Expositor for Hodder and Stoughton, a position which he held until his death.

In 1885, Nicoll was forced to retire from pastoral ministry after an attack of typhoid had badly damaged his lung. In 1886, he moved south to London. With the support of Hodder and Stoughton he founded the British Weekly, a Nonconformist newspaper, which gained great influence over opinion in the "free churches" (i.e. those Christian denominations outside the established church). He had been working with Jane Stoddart on a project and in 1890 she left teaching to join him on a full time basis as his assistant.

Nicoll secured many writers of exceptional talent for his paper (including Marcus Dods, J. M. Barrie, Ian Maclaren, Alexander Whyte, Alexander Maclaren, Carnegie Simpson and James Denney), to which he added his own considerable talents as a contributor. He began a highly popular feature, "Correspondence of Claudius Clear", which enabled him to share his interests and his reading with his readers. He was also the founding editor of The Bookman from 1891, and acted as chief literary adviser to Hodder and Stoughton.

Among his other enterprises were The Expositor's Bible (originally published by Hodder & Stoughton, 1887–1896, but afterward reprinted in New York by A. C. Armstrong & Son) and The Theological Educator. He edited The Expositor's Greek Testament (from 1897). He also edited a series of Contemporary Writers (from 1894), and of Literary Lives (from 1904).

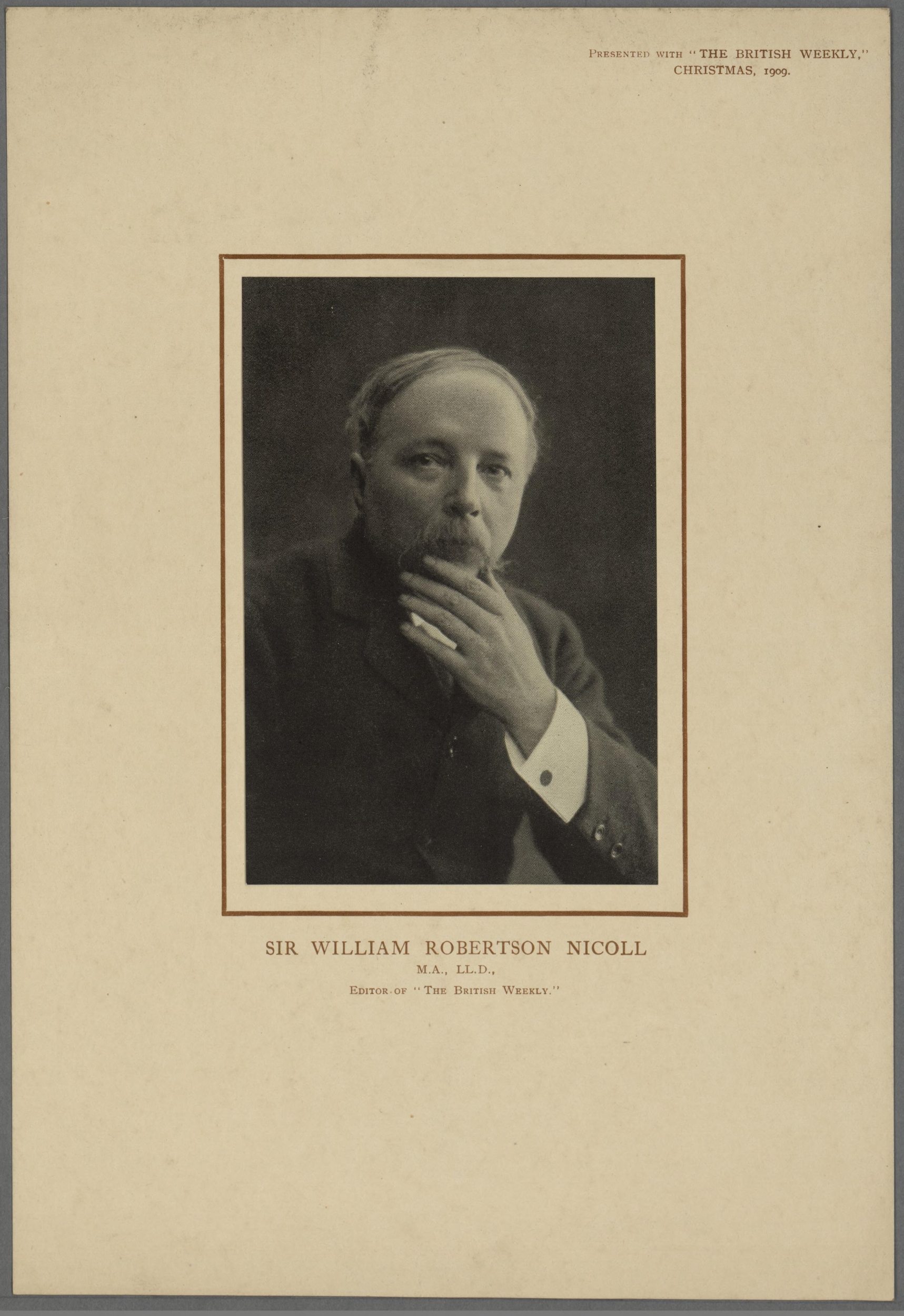
1909 portrait of Nicoll

He projected, but never wrote, a history of The Victorian Era in English Literature, and edited, with T. J. Wise, two volumes of Literary Anecdotes of the Nineteenth Century. He was knighted by King Edward VII in 1909, ostensibly for his literary work, but in reality probably more for his long-term support for the Liberal Party. He was appointed to the Order of the Companions of Honour (CH) in the 1921 Birthday Honours. Nicoll was the father of Maurice Nicoll, a leading British psychologist and author who studied under Carl Jung and became a leading expositor of the teachings of the Greco-Armenian spiritual master G.I. Gurdjieff.

He died on 4 May 1923 at his home, Bay Tree House, in Frognal, Hampstead, London and is buried in a family grave on the west side of Highgate Cemetery.

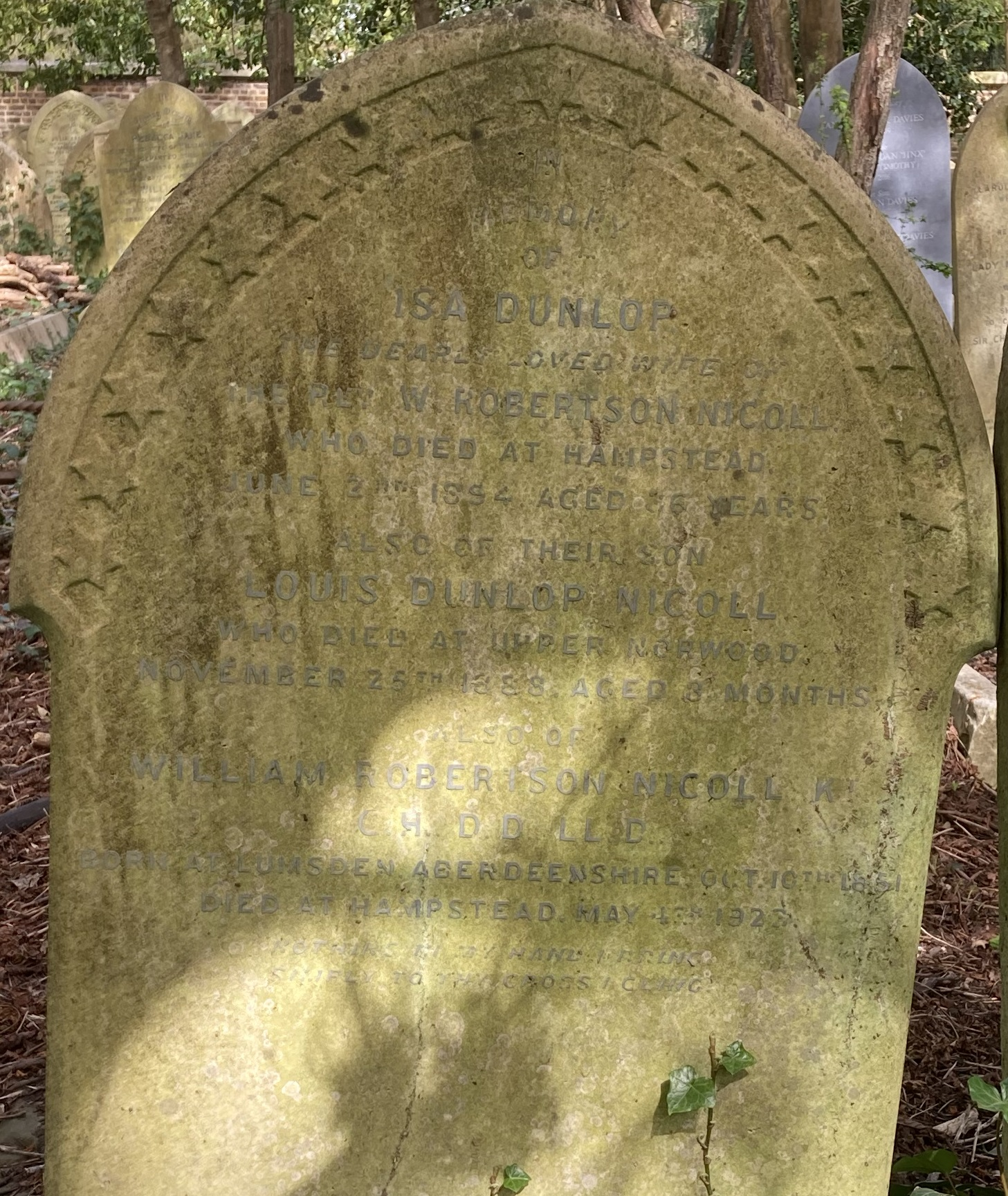
Family grave of Nicoll in Highgate Cemetery

== Family ==
He married twice: firstly in 1878 to Isabella Dunlop (1857–1894); secondly in 1897 to Catherine Pollard (1863–1960).

Children from the first marriage were Isa Constance Nicoll (1881–1963) an author and poet, and Henry Maurice Dunlop Nicoll (1884–1953) a noted psychiatrist.

The one child of the second marriage was Mildred Robertson Nicoll (1898–1995).

== Works ==
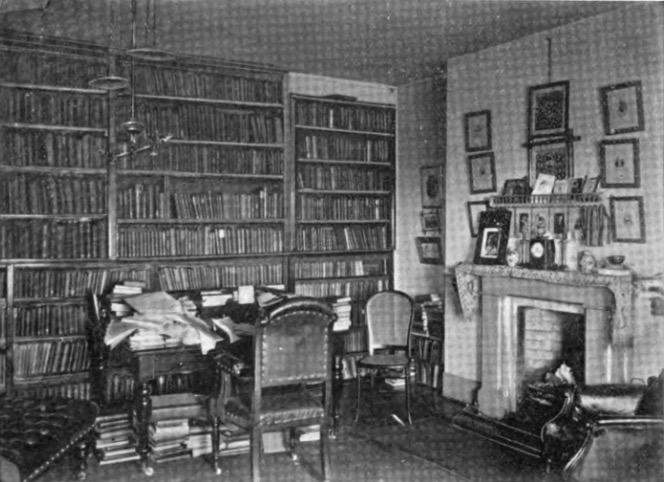
Nicoll's study room

1. Calls to Christ, (1877) Morgan & Scott: London.
2. The Yale Lectures on Preaching: (1878) Reprinted from the British and Foreign Evangelical Review.
3. Songs of Rest [First Series], (1879) Macniven & Wallace, Edinburgh: combined with Second Series (1893), Hodder & Stoughton: London.
4. The Incarnate Saviour, (1881) T. & T. Clark: Edinburgh, (1882) Robert Carter & Brothers: New York.
5. The Lamb of God, (1883) Macniven & Wallace: Edinburgh.
6. John Bunyan (1884) in The Evangelical Succession, Macniven & Wallace: Edinburgh.
7. James Macdonell, Journalist, (1890) Hodder & Stoughton: London.
8. Professor W.G. Elmslie, D.D., (1890) (with Macnicoll, A.N.) Hodder & Stoughton: London: revised and enlarged as Professor Elmslie: A Memoir (1911) by W Robertson Nicoll [but minus sermons].
9. The Key of the Grave, (1894) Hodder & Stoughton: London.
10. Ten Minute Sermons, (1894) Isbister & Co: reprinted 1910, Hodder & Stoughton.
11. The Seven Words from the Cross, (1895) Hodder & Stoughton, London.
12. When the Worst comes to the Worst, (1896) Isbister & Co.
13. Henry Drummond: A Memorial Sketch, (1897) prefixed to Drummond's posthumous volume, The Ideal Life, Hodder & Stoughton: London.
14. The Return to the Cross, (1897) reprint 1910, Hodder & Stoughton: London.
15. Letters to Ministers on the Clerical Life, (1898) (with others) Hodder & Stoughton: London.
16. The Ascent of the Soul, (1899) Isbister & Co.
17. Letters on Life: by Claudius Clear, (1901) Hodder & Stoughton: London.
18. The Church's One Foundation, (1901) Hodder & Stoughton: London.
19. A Memorial Article, Hugh Price Hughes as we knew him, (1902) H Marshall & Son.
20. Robert Louis Stevenson, in the Bookman Booklet Series, (1902/6) Hodder & Stoughton, London.
21. The Garden of Nuts, (1905) Hodder & Stoughton: London.
22. The Day Book of Claudius Clear, (1905) Hodder & Stoughton: London.
23. The Scottish Free Church Trust and its Donors, (1905) Hodder & Stoughton: London.
24. A History of English Literature [3 Volumes, originally published as The Bookman Illustrated History of English Literature] (1906) (with Seccombe) Hodder & Stoughton, London.
25. The Lamp of Sacrifice, (1906) Hodder & Stoughton: London.
26. 'Introduction and Appreciation, Memoirs of the Late Dr Barnardo, Mrs Barnardo & James Marchant, (1907) Hodder & Stoughton, London.
27. My Father. An Aberdeenshire Minister, (1908) Hodder & Stoughton: London.
28. Ian Maclaren, The Life of the Rev. John Watson D.D., (1908) Hodder & Stoughton: London.
29. 'Introduction' to Jane Stoddart's Against the Referendum, (1910) Hodder & Stoughton, London.
30. The Round of the Clock: The Story of Our Lives from Year to Year (Claudius Clear), (1910) Hodder & Stoughton: London.
31. Sermons of C.H. Spurgeon, (N/D: but after 1910) Nelson & Sons: London.
32. The Christian Attitude Towards Democracy [reprinted from the British Weekly], (1912) Hodder & Stoughton, London.
33. The Problem of 'Edwin Drood' (A study in the Methods of Dickens), (1912) Hodder & Stoughton. London.
34. A Bookman's Letters, (1913) Hodder & Stoughton: London.
35. The Difference Christ is Making [reprinted from the British Weekly], (1914) Hodder & Stoughton: London.
36. Prayer in War Time, (1916) Hodder & Stoughton: London.
37. Reunion in Eternity, (1918) Hodder & Stoughton: London.
38. Edited with 'Appreciation', Letters of Principal James Denney to W. Robertson Nicoll, (1920) Hodder & Stoughton: London.
39. Princes of the Church, (1921) Hodder & Stoughton: London.
40. Dickens's Own Story: Sidelights on his Life and personality, (1923) [reprints from 'Claudius Clear' in the British Weekly], Prefatory Note by St John Adcock, Chapman & Hall Ltd, London.
41. Memories of Mark Rutherford (William Hale White), (1924) [reprints from 'Claudius Clear' in the British Weekly], T Fisher Unwin, London.

A list of his publications up to 1902 was included in a monograph on Nicoll by Jane T. Stoddart (New Century Leaders, 1903). The official biography was written by Nicoll's friend T. H. Darlow and published in 1925 as a more complete list. A new biographical appreciation written by Keith A. Ives was published in 2011: "Voice of Nonconformity: William Robertson Nicoll and the British Weekly".
