= J. P. Struthers =

Scottish magazine editor

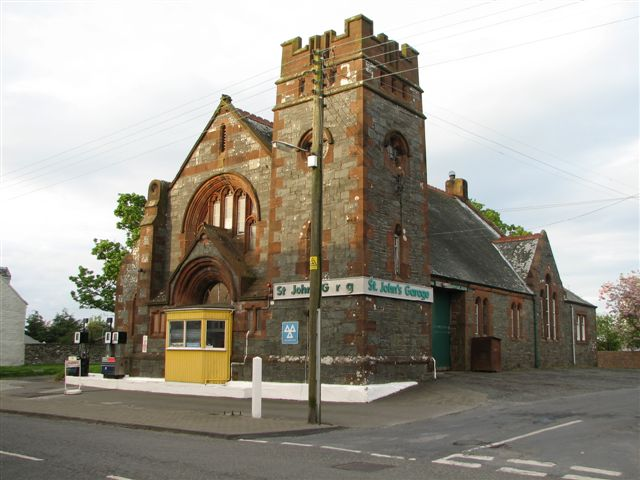
Struthers' church in Whithorn

John Paterson Struthers (1851–1915) was a Scottish preacher, pastor and children's author. He was a native of Glasgow, born there on 8 April 1851. His parents were devout members of the United Original Secession Church at the time, although in 1865 they joined the Reformed Presbyterian Church. They dedicated their son John to the ministry, a dedication he solemnly accepted for himself.

He was educated at the High School and the University of Glasgow, where he won many prizes, including two gold and two silver medals. He graduated M.A. in 1873.

Struthers studied theology at the Divinity Hall of Glasgow University and the Free Church College, Glasgow. He won Dr. John Caird's Special Prize for Sermon Composition at the University Divinity School.

He was licensed to preach by the Reformed Presbyterians on 8 May 1876 and on 1 November 1878 he was ordained minister over the Reformed Presbyterian congregation at Whithorn in Wigtownshire. There he redecorated the church and manse. After a three-year pastorate at Whithorn, Struthers was called to the pastorate of the Reformed Presbyterian Church at Greenock, where he was inducted on 25 January 1882. He spent the rest of his life as the minister there.

Theologically Struthers was a Reformed Presbyterian indeed, a staunch Calvinist and a lover of the Westminster Shorter Catechism. His preaching was popular, and he emphasised the love of God for sinners in his sermons. This love of God, exemplified in Jesus Christ dying on the cross, was the centre of his ministry.

Struthers was instrumental in building a new church for the Greenock congregation. Built to his specifications, it still stands today.

In 1887 the Reformed Presbyterian Church decided to begin its own Sunday-School magazine. Struthers took the editorship and the little work, The Morning Watch began to be issued in 1888. It consisted of twelve pages, mostly written by Struthers and illustrated by a capable Greenock artist, Miss Annie Macdonald. The professional relationship of the bachelor minister and the unmarried artist grew into something deeper and they were married on 20 May 1907.

Although offered a D.D. by Glasgow, Struthers declined it, saying that it would look ridiculous for a children's magazine to be edited by a D.D. He was always a humble man and was content to be "The Children's Editor". The theologian James Denney said the Morning Watch was one of the hundred best books in the world. Today it offers a charming window into childhood in late Victorian and Edwardian Scotland.

J.P. Struthers died suddenly on Sunday 17 January 1915. He collapsed while preaching his evening sermon, dying a few hours later.

His main published work is his beloved magazine, although his wife edited a volume of his sermons under the title Windows in Heaven (London, James Clark, 1926).
